= Tenedos (spider) =

Scientific classification
- Kingdom: Animalia
- Phylum: Arthropoda
- Subphylum: Chelicerata
- Class: Arachnida
- Order: Araneae
- Infraorder: Araneomorphae
- Family: Zodariidae
- Genus: Tenedos; O. P-Cambridge, 1897

Species
- See text.

Diversity
- 72 species

Genus of spiders

Tenedos is a spider genus of the family Zodariidae. It has around 72 species from Central and South America.

The genus is possibly paraphyletic; it forms an evolutionary lineage with the genus Ishania, but which species should be placed in which genus is not completely resolved.

== Species ==
As of May 2022, the World Spider Catalog accepted the following extant species:

- Tenedos andes Jocqué & Baert, 2002 – Colombia
- Tenedos asteronoides Jocqué & Baert, 2002 – Ecuador
- Tenedos ayo Martínez, Brescovit & Cuervo, 2022 – Colombia
- Tenedos banos Jocqué & Baert, 2002 – Ecuador
- Tenedos barronus (Chamberlin, 1925) – Panama
- Tenedos brescoviti Jocqué & Baert, 2002 – Brazil
- Tenedos calebi Martínez, Brescovit & Cuervo, 2022 – Colombia
- Tenedos capote Jocqué & Baert, 2002 – Colombia
- Tenedos caqueta Martínez, Brescovit & Cuervo, 2022 – Colombia
- Tenedos carlosprestesi Candiani, Bonaldo & Brescovit, 2008 – Brazil
- Tenedos carlosprietoi Martínez, Brescovit & Cuervo, 2022 – Colombia
- Tenedos certus (Jocqué & Ubick, 1991) – Costa Rica, Panama
- Tenedos choco Martínez, Brescovit & Cuervo, 2022 – Colombia
- Tenedos cofan Martínez, Brescovit & Cuervo, 2022 – Colombia
- Tenedos convexus Jocqué & Baert, 2002 – Venezuela
- Tenedos cufodontii (Reimoser, 1939) – Costa Rica, Panama
- Tenedos dankittipakuli Martínez, Brescovit & Cuervo, 2022 – Colombia
- Tenedos eberhardi Martínez, Brescovit & Cuervo, 2022 – Colombia
- Tenedos eduardoi (Mello-Leitão, 1925) – Brazil
- Tenedos equatorialis Jocqué & Baert, 2002 – Ecuador
- Tenedos estari Jocqué & Baert, 2002 – Peru
- Tenedos fartilis Jocqué & Baert, 2002 – Ecuador
- Tenedos figaro Jocqué & Baert, 2002 – Ecuador
- Tenedos garoa Candiani, Bonaldo & Brescovit, 2008 – Brazil
- Tenedos grandis Jocqué & Baert, 2002 – Panama, Ecuador
- Tenedos griswoldi Martínez, Brescovit & Cuervo, 2022 – Colombia
- Tenedos guacharos Martínez, Brescovit & Cuervo, 2022 – Colombia
- Tenedos henrardi Martínez, Brescovit & Cuervo, 2022 – Colombia
- Tenedos hirsutus (Mello-Leitão, 1941) – Brazil
- Tenedos hoeferi Jocqué & Baert, 2002 – Brazil
- Tenedos honduras Jocqué & Baert, 2002 – Honduras
- Tenedos humboldti Martínez, Brescovit & Cuervo, 2022 – Colombia
- Tenedos inca Jocqué & Baert, 2002 – Peru
- Tenedos inflatus Jocqué & Baert, 2002 – Peru
- Tenedos infrarmatus Jocqué & Baert, 2002 – Brazil
- Tenedos jocquei Quijano-Cuervo & Galvis, 2018 – Colombia
- Tenedos juninus Jocqué & Baert, 2002 – Peru
- Tenedos lautus O. Pickard-Cambridge, 1897 (type species) – Guatemala
- Tenedos ligulatus Jocqué & Baert, 2002 – Colombia
- Tenedos luzmarinae Martínez, Brescovit & Cuervo, 2022 – Colombia
- Tenedos macagual Martínez, Brescovit & Cuervo, 2022 – Colombia
- Tenedos major (Keyserling, 1891) – Brazil
- Tenedos marquetones Martínez, Brescovit & Cuervo, 2022 – Colombia
- Tenedos medina Martínez, Brescovit & Cuervo, 2022 – Colombia
- Tenedos mesa Martínez, Brescovit & Cuervo, 2022 – Colombia
- Tenedos microlaminatus Jocqué & Baert, 2002 – Peru
- Tenedos minor (Keyserling, 1891) – Brazil
- Tenedos nancyae Candiani, Bonaldo & Brescovit, 2008 – Peru
- Tenedos narinensis Martínez, Brescovit & Cuervo, 2022 – Colombia
- Tenedos neitai Martínez, Brescovit & Cuervo, 2022 – Colombia
- Tenedos parinca Jocqué & Baert, 2002 – Peru
- Tenedos peckorum Jocqué & Baert, 2002 – Colombia
- Tenedos pensilvania Martínez, Brescovit & Cuervo, 2022 – Colombia
- Tenedos persulcatus Jocqué & Baert, 2002 – Ecuador
- Tenedos piedecuesta Martínez, Brescovit & Cuervo, 2022 – Colombia
- Tenedos procreator Jocqué & Baert, 2002 – Brazil
- Tenedos quadrangulatus Jocqué & Baert, 2002 – Peru
- Tenedos quinquangulatus Jocqué & Baert, 2002 – Peru
- Tenedos quipile Martínez, Brescovit & Cuervo, 2022 – Colombia
- Tenedos reygeli Jocqué & Baert, 2002 – Brazil
- Tenedos santarosa Martínez, Brescovit & Cuervo, 2022 – Colombia
- Tenedos serrulatus Jocqué & Baert, 2002 – Ecuador
- Tenedos sumaco Jocqué & Baert, 2002 – Ecuador
- Tenedos tama Martínez, Brescovit & Cuervo, 2022 – Colombia
- Tenedos tatama Martínez, Brescovit & Cuervo, 2022 – Colombia
- Tenedos ticuna Martínez, Brescovit & Cuervo, 2022 – Colombia
- Tenedos trilobatus Jocqué & Baert, 2002 – Colombia
- Tenedos ufoides Jocqué & Baert, 2002 – Venezuela
- Tenedos ultimus Jocqué & Baert, 2002 – Colombia
- Tenedos venezolanus Jocqué & Baert, 2002 – Venezuela
- Tenedos wayuu Martínez, Brescovit & Cuervo, 2022 – Colombia
- Tenedos yurayaco Martínez, Brescovit & Cuervo, 2022 – Colombia
