= Tropizodium =

Scientific classification
- Kingdom: Animalia
- Phylum: Arthropoda
- Subphylum: Chelicerata
- Class: Arachnida
- Order: Araneae
- Infraorder: Araneomorphae
- Family: Zodariidae
- Genus: Tropizodium; Jocqué & Churchill, 2005

Type species
- Tropizodium peregrinum Jocqué & Churchill, 2005

Species
- 11, see text

Genus of spiders

Tropizodium is a genus of spiders in the family Zodariidae. It was first described in 2005 by Jocqué & Churchill.

== Species ==
As of July 2022, it contains 11 species:

- Tropizodium bengalense (Tikader & Patel, 1975) – India
- Tropizodium kalami Prajapati, Murthappa, Sankaran & Sebastian, 2016 – India
- Tropizodium kovvurense (Reddy & Patel, 1993) – India
- Tropizodium molokai Jocqué & Churchill, 2005 – Hawaii
- Tropizodium murphyorum Dankittipakul, Jocqué & Singtripop, 2012 – Bali
- Tropizodium peregrinum Jocqué & Churchill, 2005 – Australia (Northern Territory). Introduced to Reunion
- Tropizodium poonaense (Tikader, 1981) – India
- Tropizodium serraferum (Lin & Li, 2009) – China
- Tropizodium siam Dankittipakul, Jocqué & Singtripop, 2012 – Thailand
- Tropizodium trispinosum (Suman, 1967) – Hawaii, French Polynesia (Society Is., Tuamotu)
- Tropizodium viridurbium Prajapati, Murthappa, Sankaran & Sebastian, 2016 – India
