= Laminion =

Scientific classification
- Kingdom: Animalia
- Phylum: Arthropoda
- Subphylum: Chelicerata
- Class: Arachnida
- Order: Araneae
- Infraorder: Araneomorphae
- Family: Zodariidae
- Genus: Laminion; Sankaran, Caleb & Sebastian, 2020

Type species
- L. birenifer (Gravely, 1921)

Species
- 4, see text

Genus of spiders

Laminion is a genus of south Asian ant spiders. It was first described by P. M. Sankaran, J. T. D. Caleb and P. A. Sebastian in 2020, and it has only been found in India.

== Species ==
As of November 2021 it contains 4 species:

- L. arakuense (Patel & Reddy, 1989) – India
- L. birenifer (Gravely, 1921) – India
- L. debasrae (Biswas & Biswas, 1992) – India
- L. gujaratense (Tikader & Patel, 1975) – India
