= Mallinella elegans =

Scientific classification
- Kingdom: Animalia
- Phylum: Arthropoda
- Subphylum: Chelicerata
- Class: Arachnida
- Order: Araneae
- Infraorder: Araneomorphae
- Family: Zodariidae
- Genus: Mallinella
- Species: M. elegans

Binomial name
- Mallinella elegans Dankittipakul, Jocqué & Singtripop, 2012

Species of spider

Mallinella elegans is a species of spider in the family Zodariidae. It is found in Malaysia.
