= Euasteron =

Scientific classification
- Domain: Eukaryota
- Kingdom: Animalia
- Phylum: Arthropoda
- Subphylum: Chelicerata
- Class: Arachnida
- Order: Araneae
- Infraorder: Araneomorphae
- Family: Zodariidae
- Genus: Euasteron; Baehr

Type species
- Euasteron enterprise

Species
- 17, see text

Genus of spiders

Euasteron is a genus of spiders in the family Zodariidae. It was first described in 2003 by Baehr. As of 2017, it contains 17 species, all found in Australia.

== Species ==
Euasteron comprises the following species:

- E. atriceps Baehr, 2003 — Australia (Western Australia)
- E. bartoni Baehr, 2003 — Australia (Victoria)
- E. carnarvon Baehr, 2003 — Australia (Western Australia)
- E. churchillae Baehr, 2003 — Australia (Northern Territory)
- E. enterprise Baehr, 2003 (type) — Australia (Queensland)
- E. gibsonae Baehr, 2003 — Australia (Northern Territory, Queensland)
- E. harveyi Baehr, 2003 — Australia (Western Australia)
- E. johannae Baehr, 2003 — Australia (Western Australia)
- E. juliannae Baehr, 2003 — Australia (Western Australia)
- E. krebsorum Baehr, 2003 — Australia (New South Wales, South Australia)
- E. lorne Baehr, 2003 — Australia (New South Wales)
- E. milledgei Baehr, 2003 — Australia (New South Wales)
- E. monteithorum Baehr, 2003 — Australia (Queensland, New South Wales)
- E. raveni Baehr, 2003 — Australia (Queensland)
- E. ulrichi Baehr, 2003 — Australia (Western Australia)
- E. ursulae Baehr, 2003 — Australia (Western Australia)
- E. willeroo Baehr, 2003 — Australia (Northern Territory)
