= Spinozodium =

Scientific classification
- Kingdom: Animalia
- Phylum: Arthropoda
- Subphylum: Chelicerata
- Class: Arachnida
- Order: Araneae
- Infraorder: Araneomorphae
- Family: Zodariidae
- Genus: Spinozodium; Zamani & Marusik, 2022

Type species
- Zodarion denisi Spassky, 1938

Species
- 2, see text

Genus of spiders

Spinozodium is a genus of spiders in the family Zodariidae.

== Distribution ==
Spinozodium is only known from Tajikistan.

== Etymology ==
The genus name is a combination of Latin "spino-" (referring to spine-like setae on the retrolateral tibial apophysis of the male palp), and the genus ending "-zodium" typical for Zodariidae genera.

S. khatlonicum is named after its type locality, Khatlon Region.

== Species ==
As of January 2026, this genus includes two species:

- Spinozodium denisi (Spassky, 1938) – Tajikistan
- Spinozodium khatlonicum Zamani & Marusik, 2022 – Tajikistan
