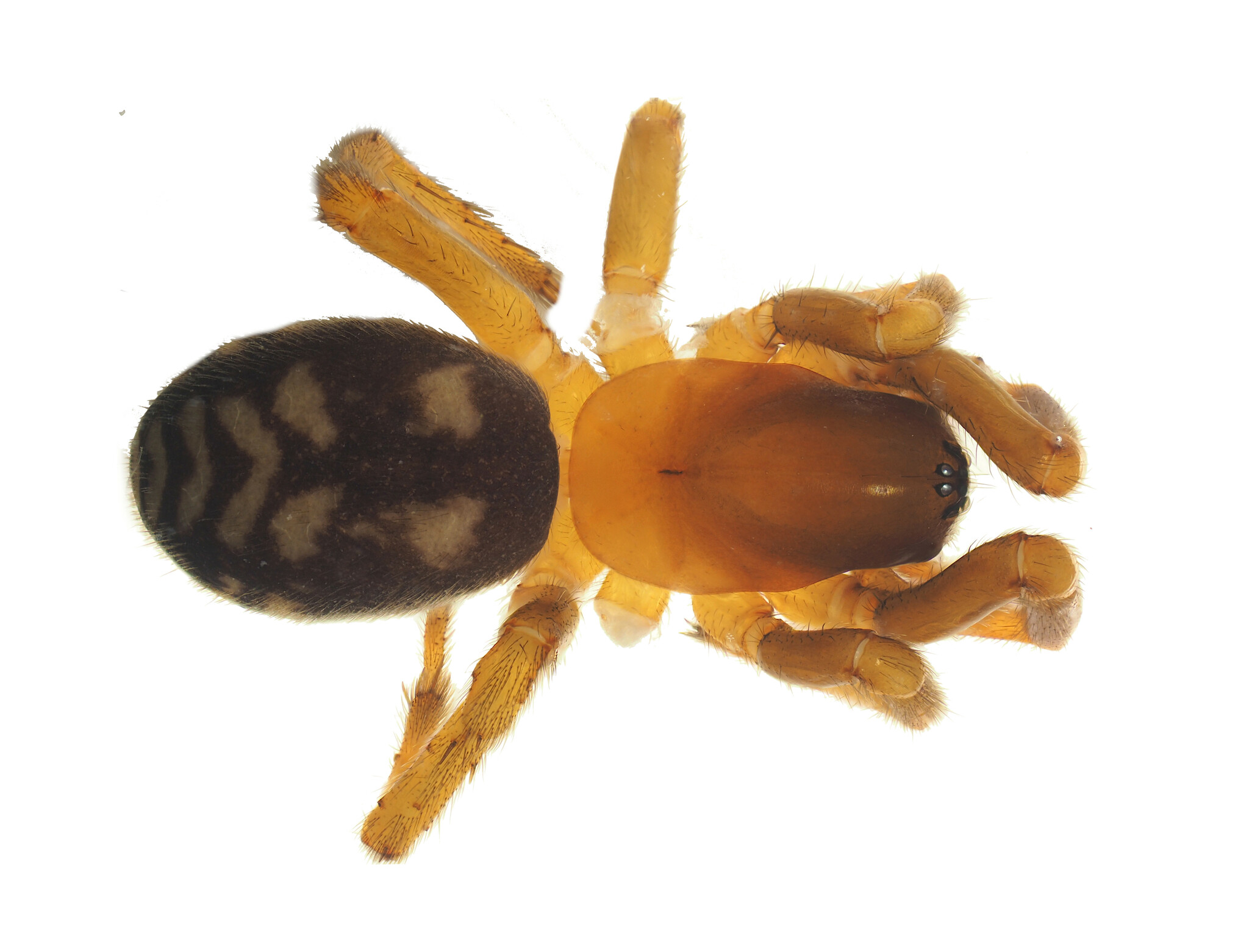
- Nosterella nadgee

Scientific classification
- Kingdom: Animalia
- Phylum: Arthropoda
- Subphylum: Chelicerata
- Class: Arachnida
- Order: Araneae
- Infraorder: Araneomorphae
- Family: Zodariidae
- Genus: Nosterella; Jocqué

Type species
- Nosterella nadgee

Species
- 6, see text

= Nosterella =

Genus of spiders

Nosterella is a genus of spiders in the family Zodariidae. It was first described in 2017 by Baehr & Jocqué. As of 2017, it contains 6 Australian species.

== Species ==
Nosterella comprises the following species:

- N. cavicola Baehr & Jocqué, 2017 — Australia (Queensland)
- N. christineae Baehr & Jocqué, 2017 — Australia (Queensland)
- N. diabolica Baehr & Jocqué, 2017 — Australia (New South Wales)
- N. fitzgibboni Baehr & Jocqué, 2017 — Australia (Queensland)
- N. nadgee (Jocqué, 1995) (type) — Australia (Queensland, New South Wales, Lord Howe Is.)
- N. pollardi Baehr & Jocqué, 2017 — Australia (Lord Howe Is.)
