= Hetaerica =

Scientific classification
- Domain: Eukaryota
- Kingdom: Animalia
- Phylum: Arthropoda
- Subphylum: Chelicerata
- Class: Arachnida
- Order: Araneae
- Infraorder: Araneomorphae
- Family: Zodariidae
- Genus: Hetaerica; Rainbow

Type species
- Hetaerica scenica

Species
- Hetaerica harveyi Raven & Baehr, 2000; Hetaerica scenica (L. Koch, 1872)

Genus of spiders

Hetaerica is a genus of spiders in the family Zodariidae. It was first described in 1916 by Rainbow. As of 2017, it contains 2 Australian species.
