= Holasteron =

Scientific classification
- Kingdom: Animalia
- Phylum: Arthropoda
- Subphylum: Chelicerata
- Class: Arachnida
- Order: Araneae
- Infraorder: Araneomorphae
- Family: Zodariidae
- Genus: Holasteron; Baehr

Type species
- Holasteron aciculare

Species
- 16, see text

Genus of spiders

Holasteron is a genus of spiders in the family Zodariidae. It was first described in 2004 by Baehr. As of 2017, it contains 16 species, all from Australia.

== Species ==
Holasteron comprises the following species:

- H. aciculare Baehr, 2004 (type) — Australia
- H. aspinosum Baehr, 2004 — Australia (Western Australia)
- H. driscolli Baehr, 2004 — Australia (New South Wales, South Australia)
- H. esperance Baehr, 2004 — Australia (Western Australia)
- H. flinders Baehr, 2004 — Australia (South Australia)
- H. hirsti Baehr, 2004 — Australia (South Australia)
- H. humphreysi Baehr, 2004 — Australia (South Australia)
- H. kangaroo Baehr, 2004 — Australia (South Australia)
- H. marliesae Baehr, 2004 — Australia (New South Wales)
- H. perth Baehr, 2004 — Australia (Western Australia)
- H. pusillum Baehr, 2004 — Australia (Western Australia, South Australia)
- H. quemuseum Baehr, 2004 — Australia (Queensland)
- H. reinholdae Baehr, 2004 — Australia (Western Australia)
- H. spinosum Baehr, 2004 — Australia (Western Australia, South Australia, Victoria)
- H. stirling Baehr, 2004 — Australia (Western Australia)
- H. wamuseum Baehr, 2004 — Australia (Western Australia)
