= Mastidiores =

Scientific classification
- Kingdom: Animalia
- Phylum: Arthropoda
- Subphylum: Chelicerata
- Class: Arachnida
- Order: Araneae
- Infraorder: Araneomorphae
- Family: Zodariidae
- Genus: Mastidiores
- Species: M. kora

Binomial name
- Mastidiores kora Jocqué, 1987

Genus of spiders

Mastidiores is a genus of spiders in the family Zodariidae. It was first described in 1987 by Jocqué. As of 2017, it contains only one species, Mastidiores kora, found in Kenya.
