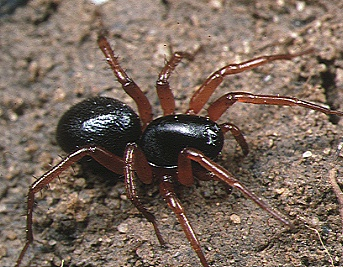
- Female

Scientific classification
- Domain: Eukaryota
- Kingdom: Animalia
- Phylum: Arthropoda
- Subphylum: Chelicerata
- Class: Arachnida
- Order: Araneae
- Infraorder: Araneomorphae
- Family: Zodariidae
- Genus: Mallinella
- Species: M. fulvipes

Binomial name
- Mallinella fulvipes (Ono & Tanikawa, 1990)

= Mallinella fulvipes =

Species of spider

Mallinella fulvipes is a species of spider in the family Zodariidae, found in the Ryukyu Islands.
