= Palaestina (spider) =

Scientific classification
- Kingdom: Animalia
- Phylum: Arthropoda
- Subphylum: Chelicerata
- Class: Arachnida
- Order: Araneae
- Infraorder: Araneomorphae
- Family: Zodariidae
- Genus: Palaestina; O. Pickard-Cambridge, 1872

Type species
- P. expolita O. Pickard-Cambridge, 1872

Genus of spiders

Palaestina is a genus of ant spiders first described by Octavius Pickard-Cambridge in 1872, with three described species.

== Species ==
As of October 2025, this genus includes three species:

- Palaestina dentifera O. Pickard-Cambridge, 1872 – Turkey, Israel
- Palaestina eremica Levy, 1992 – Egypt, Israel
- Palaestina expolita O. Pickard-Cambridge, 1872 – Greece, Cyprus, Turkey, Lebanon, Israel (type species)
