= Chilumena =

Scientific classification
- Kingdom: Animalia
- Phylum: Arthropoda
- Subphylum: Chelicerata
- Class: Arachnida
- Order: Araneae
- Infraorder: Araneomorphae
- Family: Zodariidae
- Genus: Chilumena; Jocqué, 1995

Type species
- Chilumena reprobans

Species
- Chilumena baehrorum Jocqué, 1995; Chilumena reprobans Jocqué, 1995

Genus of spiders

Chilumena is a genus of spiders endemic to Australia in the family Zodariidae. It was first described in 1995 by Rudy Jocqué. As of 2024, it contains 2 species.
