= Nostera =

Scientific classification
- Kingdom: Animalia
- Phylum: Arthropoda
- Subphylum: Chelicerata
- Class: Arachnida
- Order: Araneae
- Infraorder: Araneomorphae
- Family: Zodariidae
- Genus: Nostera; Jocqué

Type species
- Nostera lynx

Species
- Nostera geoffgarretti Baehr & Jocqué, 2017; Nostera lynx Jocqué, 1991; Nostera spinata Baehr & Jocqué, 2017; Nostera trifurcata Baehr & Jocqué, 2017

Genus of spiders

Nostera is a genus of spiders in the family Zodariidae. It was first described in 1991 by Jocqué. As of 2017, it contains 4 Australian species.
