= Phenasteron =

Scientific classification
- Kingdom: Animalia
- Phylum: Arthropoda
- Subphylum: Chelicerata
- Class: Arachnida
- Order: Araneae
- Infraorder: Araneomorphae
- Family: Zodariidae
- Genus: Phenasteron; Jocqué

Type species
- Phenasteron longiconductor

Species
- Phenasteron longiconductor Baehr & Jocqué, 2001; Phenasteron machinosum Baehr & Jocqué, 2001

Genus of spiders

Phenasteron is a genus of spiders in the family Zodariidae. It was first described in 2001 by Baehr & Jocqué. As of 2017, it contains 2 Australian species.
