= Malayozodarion =

Scientific classification
- Domain: Eukaryota
- Kingdom: Animalia
- Phylum: Arthropoda
- Subphylum: Chelicerata
- Class: Arachnida
- Order: Araneae
- Infraorder: Araneomorphae
- Family: Zodariidae
- Genus: Malayozodarion
- Species: M. hoiseni

Binomial name
- Malayozodarion hoiseni Ono & Hashim, 2008

Genus of spiders

Malayozodarion is a genus of spiders in the family Zodariidae. It was first described in 2008 by Ono & Hashim. As of 2017, it contains only one species, Malayozodarion hoiseni, found in Malaysia.
