= Cambonilla =

Scientific classification
- Kingdom: Animalia
- Phylum: Arthropoda
- Subphylum: Chelicerata
- Class: Arachnida
- Order: Araneae
- Infraorder: Araneomorphae
- Family: Zodariidae
- Genus: Cambonilla; Jocqué, 2019

Species
- C. securicula Jocqué, 2019 — Cambodia, Laos; C. symphonia Jocqué & Henrard, 2019 — Cambodia

Genus of spiders

Cambonilla is a genus of Cambodian and Laotian ant spiders first described by Rudy Jocqué in 2019. As of November 2024 it contains only two species.
