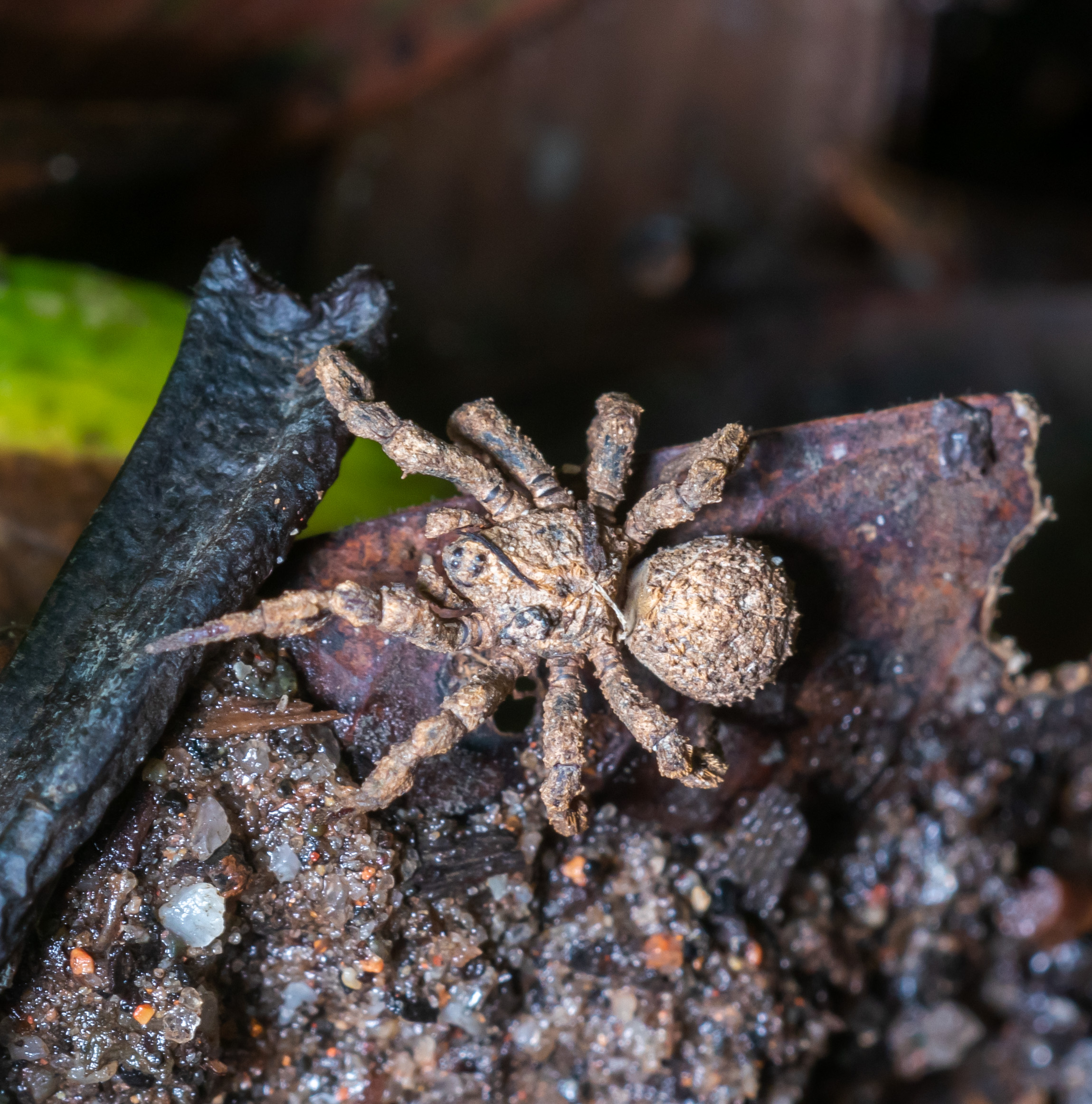
- Cryptothele sundaica from Sumatra

Scientific classification
- Kingdom: Animalia
- Phylum: Arthropoda
- Subphylum: Chelicerata
- Class: Arachnida
- Order: Araneae
- Infraorder: Araneomorphae
- Family: Zodariidae
- Genus: Cryptothele; L. Koch, 1872

Species
- See text.

Diversity
- 10 species

= Cryptothele (spider) =

Genus of spiders

Cryptothele is a spider genus with eight described species, now placed in the family Zodariidae.

This genus was the sole member of the family Cryptothelidae, which is no longer accepted.

== Distribution ==
The genus occurs in tropical Asia and Australasia.

== Species ==
As of December 2023, the World Spider Catalog accepted the following species:

- Cryptothele alluaudi Simon, 1893 — Seychelles
- Cryptothele ceylonica O. P-Cambridge, 1877 — Sri Lanka
- Cryptothele collina Pocock, 1901 — India
- Cryptothele cristata Simon, 1884 — Unknown
- Cryptothele doreyana Simon, 1890 — New Guinea, Queensland
- Cryptothele marchei Simon, 1890 — New Caledonia, Mariana Islands
- Cryptothele sundaica Thorell, 1890 — Singapore, Sumatra, Java
  - Cryptothele sundaica amplior Kulczyński, 1911 — Indonesia (Sunda Is.)
  - Cryptothele sundaica javana Kulczyński, 1911 — Indonesia (Java)
- Cryptothele verrucosa L. Koch, 1872 — Samoa, Fiji
