= Indozodion =

Scientific classification
- Kingdom: Animalia
- Phylum: Arthropoda
- Subphylum: Chelicerata
- Class: Arachnida
- Order: Araneae
- Infraorder: Araneomorphae
- Family: Zodariidae
- Genus: Indozodion; Ovtchinnikov, 2006

Type species
- I. inayatullahi Ovtchinnikov, 2006

Species
- 2, see text

Genus of spiders

Indozodion is a genus of spiders in the family Zodariidae.

== Distribution ==
Indozodion is known from Pakistan (near Islamabad) and Afghanistan.

== Etymology ==
The genus name is a combination of the Indus River and a shortened form of Zodarion. I. inayatullahi honors Prof. Dr. Mian Inayatullah.

== Species ==
As of January 2026, this genus includes two species:

- Indozodion inayatullahi Ovtchinnikov, 2006 – Pakistan
- Indozodion lindbergi (Roewer, 1960) – Afghanistan, Pakistan
