= Lutica =

Scientific classification
- Kingdom: Animalia
- Phylum: Arthropoda
- Subphylum: Chelicerata
- Class: Arachnida
- Order: Araneae
- Infraorder: Araneomorphae
- Family: Zodariidae
- Genus: Lutica; Marx, 1891

Type species
- Lutica maculata Marx, 1891

Diversity
- 4 species

Genus of spiders

Lutica is a genus of zodariid spiders that occurs only in North America on both the mainland California coast and the Channel Islands. Lutica abalonea is known from the coast west of Oxnard, California, Lutica clementea is known from San Clemente Island, Lutica maculata is known from Santa Rosa Island, and Lutica nicolasia is known from San Nicolas Island. It is believed that there is another species found on San Miguel Island, though it has not been described due to lack of adult specimens.

These spiders are found living in coastal sand dunes in and around clumps of foliage. Unlike many spiders, Lutica build web tubes that are covered in sand. These tubes are used to detect prey, such as Coelus globosus, when they cross the tube, similar to the hunting style of purseweb spiders. Lutica also do not balloon as most spiders do but rather stay fairly close to their initial locations in their dune environment and non-reproductive terrestrial migration is uncommon.

== Species ==
Lutica comprises 4 species:

- Lutica abalonea Gertsch, 1961 — USA
- Lutica clementea Gertsch, 1961 — USA
- Lutica maculata Marx, 1891 — USA
- Lutica nicolasia Gertsch, 1961 — USA
