= Neostorena =

Scientific classification
- Domain: Eukaryota
- Kingdom: Animalia
- Phylum: Arthropoda
- Subphylum: Chelicerata
- Class: Arachnida
- Order: Araneae
- Infraorder: Araneomorphae
- Family: Zodariidae
- Genus: Neostorena; Rainbow, 1914

Type species
- Neostorena venatoria

Species
- 7, see text

Genus of spiders

Neostorena is a genus of spiders in the family Zodariidae. It was first described in 1914 by William Joseph Rainbow. As of 2017, it contains 7 species from Australia.

== Species ==
Neostorena comprises the following species:

- N. grayi Jocqué, 1991 — Australia (New South Wales)
- N. minor Jocqué, 1991 — Australia (Queensland, New South Wales)
- N. spirafera (L. Koch, 1872) — Australia (Queensland)
- N. torosa (Simon, 1908) — Australia (Western Australia)
- N. venatoria Rainbow, 1914 (type) — Australia (Victoria)
- N. victoria Jocqué, 1991 — Australia (Victoria)
- N. vituperata Jocqué, 1995 — Australia (Queensland)
