= Pseudasteron =

Scientific classification
- Kingdom: Animalia
- Phylum: Arthropoda
- Subphylum: Chelicerata
- Class: Arachnida
- Order: Araneae
- Infraorder: Araneomorphae
- Family: Zodariidae
- Genus: Pseudasteron
- Species: P. simile

Binomial name
- Pseudasteron simile Jocqué & Baehr, 2001

Genus of spiders

Pseudasteron is a genus of spiders in the family Zodariidae. It was first described in 2001 by Jocqué & Baehr. As of 2017, it contains only one species, Pseudasteron simile, found in Queensland.
