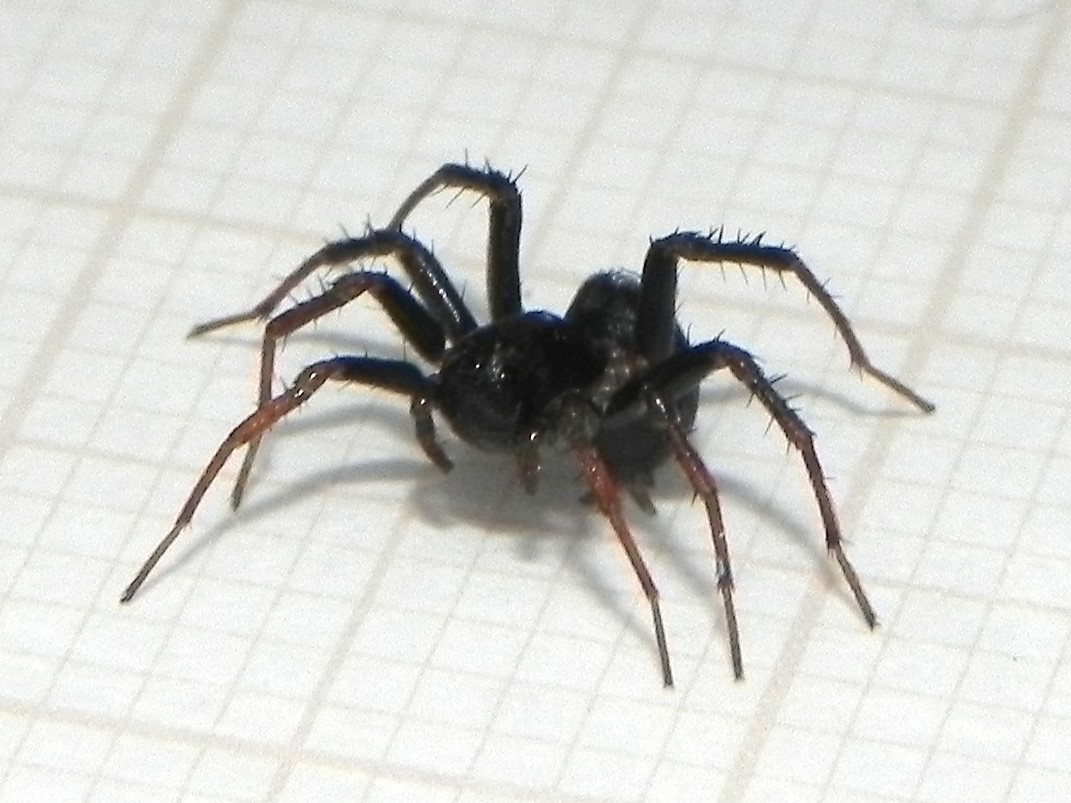
- Leprolochus levergere

Scientific classification
- Kingdom: Animalia
- Phylum: Arthropoda
- Subphylum: Chelicerata
- Class: Arachnida
- Order: Araneae
- Infraorder: Araneomorphae
- Family: Zodariidae
- Genus: Leprolochus; Simon

Type species
- Leprolochus spinifrons

Species
- 7, see text

= Leprolochus =

Genus of spiders

Leprolochus is a genus of spiders in the family Zodariidae. It was first described in 1893 by Simon. As of 2017, it contains 7 South American species.

== Species ==
Leprolochus comprises the following species:

- L. birabeni Mello-Leitão, 1942 — Brazil, Paraguay, Argentina
- L. levergere Lise, 1994 — Brazil
- L. mucuge Lise, 1994 — Brazil
- L. oeiras Lise, 1994 — Brazil
- L. parahybae Mello-Leitão, 1917 — Brazil
- L. spinifrons Simon, 1893 (type) — Panama to Venezuela
- L. stratus Jocqué & Platnick, 1990 — Venezuela
