= Colimarena =

Scientific classification
- Kingdom: Animalia
- Phylum: Arthropoda
- Subphylum: Chelicerata
- Class: Arachnida
- Order: Araneae
- Infraorder: Araneomorphae
- Family: Zodariidae
- Genus: Colimarena; Jocqué & Baert, 2006

Species
- See text.

Diversity
- 2 species

Genus of spiders

Colimarena is a genus of spiders in the family Zodariidae (ant spiders), found in the state of Colima, Mexico.

== Description ==
Colimarena species are medium-sized spiders, with a body length of 3.5–6.0 mm. The fourth leg is longest. The cephalothorax (prosoma) is pale orange to pale brown in colour; the abdomen is mostly darker with a paler pattern of chevrons and spots.

== Taxonomy ==
The genus was erected in 2005 by Rudy Jocqué and Léon Baert for two new species from the Mexican state of Colima. The generic name is based on this location. Colimarena is distinguished from related genera by the very high clypeus and the shape of the male palpal bulb: the tegulum is horseshoe-shaped and the embolus is mostly hidden in a hollow in the tegulum. The genus name was changed from Colima to Colimarena in 2021 on account of Colima being preoccupied in Opiliones.

=== Species ===
As of November 2024, the World Spider Catalog accepted the following species:

- Colimarena colima Jocqué & Baert, 2006 – Mexico
- Colimarena manzanillo Jocqué & Baert, 2006 – Mexico
