= Nodocion floridanus =

Scientific classification
- Domain: Eukaryota
- Kingdom: Animalia
- Phylum: Arthropoda
- Subphylum: Chelicerata
- Class: Arachnida
- Order: Araneae
- Infraorder: Araneomorphae
- Family: Gnaphosidae
- Genus: Nodocion
- Species: N. floridanus

Binomial name
- Nodocion floridanus (Banks, 1896)

Synonyms
- Liodrassus deceptus Gertsch & Mulaik, 1936; Liodrassus floridicolens Chamberlin, 1936; Nodocion melanie Levi, 1951; Prosthesima floridana Banks, 1896

Species of spider

Nodocion floridanus is a species of ground spider in the family Gnaphosidae. It is found in the United States and Mexico.
