= Basasteron =

Scientific classification
- Domain: Eukaryota
- Kingdom: Animalia
- Phylum: Arthropoda
- Subphylum: Chelicerata
- Class: Arachnida
- Order: Araneae
- Infraorder: Araneomorphae
- Family: Zodariidae
- Genus: Basasteron; Baehr, 2003
- Species: B. leucosemum

Binomial name
- Basasteron leucosemum (Rainbow, 1920)

Genus of spiders

Basasteron is a monotypic genus of spiders in the family Zodariidae. It was first described by Barbara Baehr in 2003. As of 2024, it contains only one species, Basasteron leucosemum, from Lord Howe Island.
