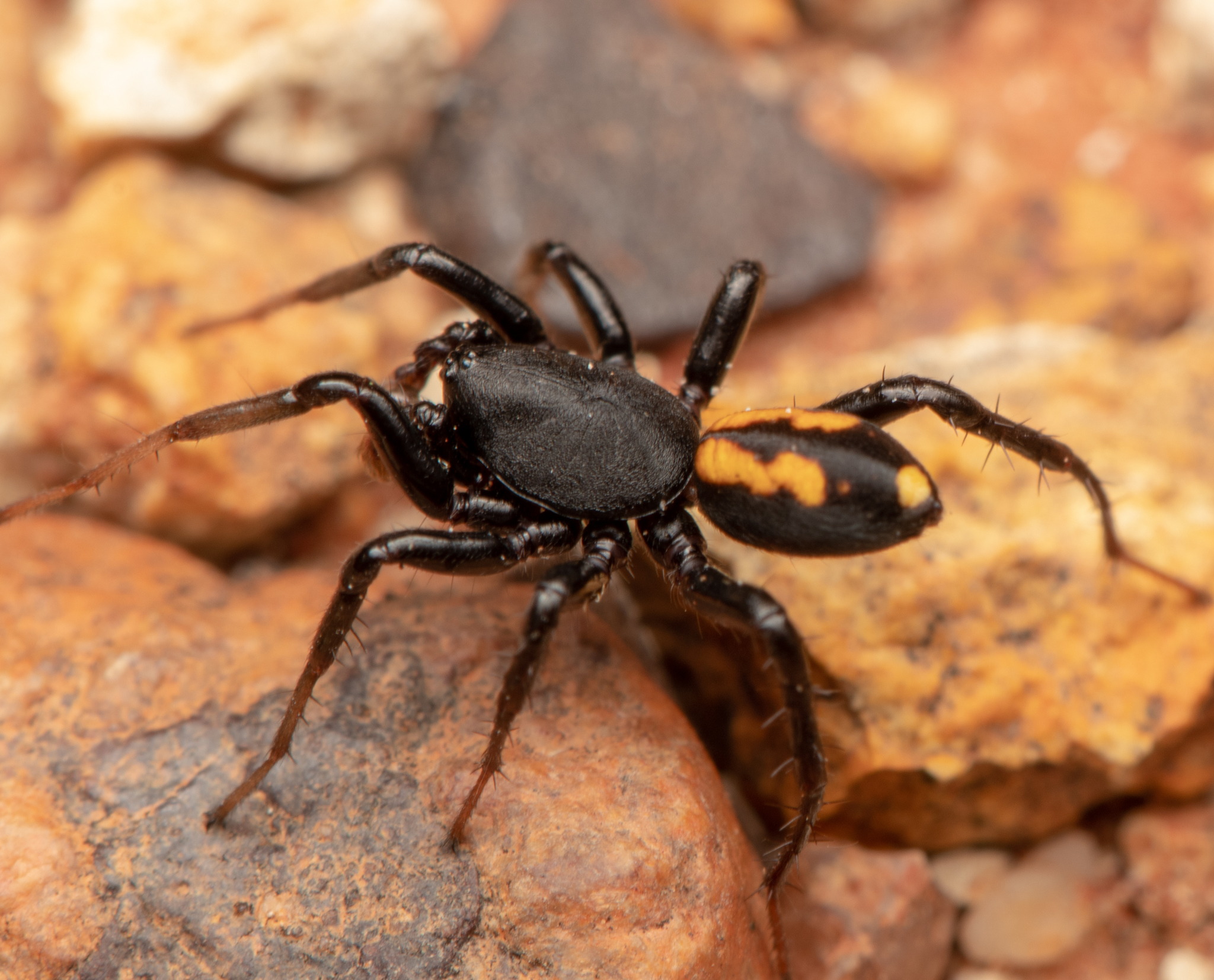
- Notasteron lawlessi

Scientific classification
- Kingdom: Animalia
- Phylum: Arthropoda
- Subphylum: Chelicerata
- Class: Arachnida
- Order: Araneae
- Infraorder: Araneomorphae
- Family: Zodariidae
- Genus: Notasteron; Baehr

Type species
- Notasteron lawlessi

Species
- Notasteron carnarvon Baehr, 2005; Notasteron lawlessi Baehr, 2005

= Notasteron =

Genus of spiders

Notasteron is a genus of spiders in the family Zodariidae. It was first described in 2005 by Baehr. As of 2017, it contains 2 Australian species.
