= Minasteron =

Scientific classification
- Kingdom: Animalia
- Phylum: Arthropoda
- Subphylum: Chelicerata
- Class: Arachnida
- Order: Araneae
- Infraorder: Araneomorphae
- Family: Zodariidae
- Genus: Minasteron; Jocqué

Species
- Minasteron minusculum Baehr & Jocqué, 2000; Minasteron perfoliatum Baehr & Jocqué, 2000; Minasteron tangens Baehr & Jocqué, 2000

Genus of spiders

Minasteron is a genus of spiders in the family Zodariidae. It was first described in 2000 by Baehr & Jocqué. As of 2017, it contains 3 Australian species.
