= Asteron =

Scientific classification
- Kingdom: Animalia
- Phylum: Arthropoda
- Subphylum: Chelicerata
- Class: Arachnida
- Order: Araneae
- Infraorder: Araneomorphae
- Family: Zodariidae
- Genus: Asteron; Jocqué

Type species
- Asteron reticulatum

Species
- 8, see text

Genus of spiders

Asteron is a genus of spiders in the family Zodariidae. It was first described in 1991 by Rudy Jocqué. As of November 2024, it contains 8 Australian species.

== Species ==
Asteron comprises the following species:

- Asteron biperforatum Jocqué & Baehr, 2001
- Asteron grayi Jocqué & Baehr, 2001
- Asteron hunti Jocqué & Baehr, 2001
- Asteron inflatum Jocqué & Baehr, 2001
- Asteron quintum Jocqué & Baehr, 2001
- Asteron reticulatum Jocqué, 1991
- Asteron tasmaniense Jocqué & Baehr, 2001
- Asteron zabkai Jocqué & Baehr, 2001
