= Masasteron =

Scientific classification
- Domain: Eukaryota
- Kingdom: Animalia
- Phylum: Arthropoda
- Subphylum: Chelicerata
- Class: Arachnida
- Order: Araneae
- Infraorder: Araneomorphae
- Family: Zodariidae
- Genus: Masasteron; Baehr

Type species
- Masasteron mas

Species
- 21, see text

Genus of spiders

Masasteron is a genus of spiders in the family Zodariidae. It was first described in 2004 by Baehr. As of 2017, it contains 21 Australian species.

== Species ==
Masasteron comprises the following species:

- Masasteron barkly Baehr, 2004
- Masasteron bennieae Baehr, 2004
- Masasteron bipunctatum Baehr, 2004
- Masasteron burbidgei Baehr, 2004
- Masasteron clifton Baehr, 2004
- Masasteron complector Baehr, 2004
- Masasteron darwin Baehr, 2004
- Masasteron derby Baehr, 2004
- Masasteron deserticola Baehr, 2004
- Masasteron gracilis Baehr, 2004
- Masasteron haroldi Baehr, 2004
- Masasteron mackenziei Baehr, 2004
- Masasteron maini Baehr, 2004
- Masasteron mas (Jocqué, 1991)
- Masasteron ocellum Baehr, 2004
- Masasteron piankai Baehr, 2004
- Masasteron queensland Baehr, 2004
- Masasteron sampeyae Baehr, 2004
- Masasteron tealei Baehr, 2004
- Masasteron tuart Baehr, 2004
- Masasteron utae Baehr, 2004
