= Nodocion =

Scientific classification
- Kingdom: Animalia
- Phylum: Arthropoda
- Subphylum: Chelicerata
- Class: Arachnida
- Order: Araneae
- Infraorder: Araneomorphae
- Family: Gnaphosidae
- Genus: Nodocion; Chamberlin, 1922

Type species
- N. mateonus Chamberlin, 1922

Species
- 8, see text

Synonyms
- Liodrassus Chamberlin, 1935

Genus of spiders

Nodocion is a genus of ground spiders that was first described by R. V. Chamberlin in 1922.

== Species ==
As of May 2019 it contains eight species:

- Nodocion eclecticus Chamberlin, 1924 – North America
- Nodocion floridanus (Banks, 1896) – USA, Mexico
- Nodocion mateonus Chamberlin, 1922 (type) – USA
- Nodocion rufithoracicus Worley, 1928 – USA, Canada
- Nodocion solanensis Tikader & Gajbe, 1977 – India
- Nodocion tikaderi (Gajbe, 1993) – India
- Nodocion utus (Chamberlin, 1936) – USA, Mexico
- Nodocion voluntarius (Chamberlin, 1919) – North America
