= Zodariellum =

Scientific classification
- Kingdom: Animalia
- Phylum: Arthropoda
- Subphylum: Chelicerata
- Class: Arachnida
- Order: Araneae
- Infraorder: Araneomorphae
- Family: Zodariidae
- Genus: Zodariellum
- Species: Z. surprisum

Binomial name
- Zodariellum surprisum Andreeva & Tyschchenko, 1968

Genus of spiders

Zodariellum is a genus of ant spiders mainly found in Central Asia. Their capture frequency and paralysis latency are different while capturing different ant species. First described in 1968 by Andreeva & Tyschchenko, many included species have been transferred to other genera and it now contains only one species, Zodariellum surprisum.
