= Dusmadiores =

Scientific classification
- Kingdom: Animalia
- Phylum: Arthropoda
- Subphylum: Chelicerata
- Class: Arachnida
- Order: Araneae
- Infraorder: Araneomorphae
- Family: Zodariidae
- Genus: Dusmadiores; Jocqué

Type species
- Dusmadiores katelijnae

Species
- 6, see text

Genus of spiders

Dusmadiores is a genus of spiders in the family Zodariidae. It was first described in 1987 by Jocqué. As of 2017, it contains 6 species.

== Species ==
Dusmadiores comprises the following species:

- Dusmadiores deserticola Jocqué, 2011
- Dusmadiores doubeni Jocqué, 1987
- Dusmadiores katelijnae Jocqué, 1987
- Dusmadiores laminatus Russell-Smith & Jocqué, 2015
- Dusmadiores orientalis Jocqué & van Harten, 2015
- Dusmadiores robanja Jocqué, 1987
