= Cybaeodamus =

Scientific classification
- Kingdom: Animalia
- Phylum: Arthropoda
- Subphylum: Chelicerata
- Class: Arachnida
- Order: Araneae
- Infraorder: Araneomorphae
- Family: Zodariidae
- Genus: Cybaeodamus; Mello-Leitão, 1938

Type species
- Cybaeodamus ornatus

Species
- 8, see text

Genus of spiders

Cybaeodamus is a genus of spiders in the family Zodariidae. It was first described in 1938 by Cândido Firmino de Mello-Leitão. As of 2024, it contains 8 species, all from South America.

== Species ==
Cybaeodamus comprises the following species:

- C. brescoviti Lise, Ott & Rodrigues, 2009 — Brazil
- C. enigmaticus (Mello-Leitão, 1939) — Argentina
- C. lentiginosus (Simon, 1905) — Argentina
- C. lycosoides (Nicolet, 1849) — Peru, Chile
- C. meridionalis Lise, Ott & Rodrigues, 2009 — Brazil, Paraguay, Argentina
- C. ornatus Mello-Leitão, 1938 (type) — Peru, Argentina, Uruguay
- C. taim Lise, Ott & Rodrigues, 2009 — Brazil, Argentina
- C. tocantins Lise, Ott & Rodrigues, 2009 — Brazil
