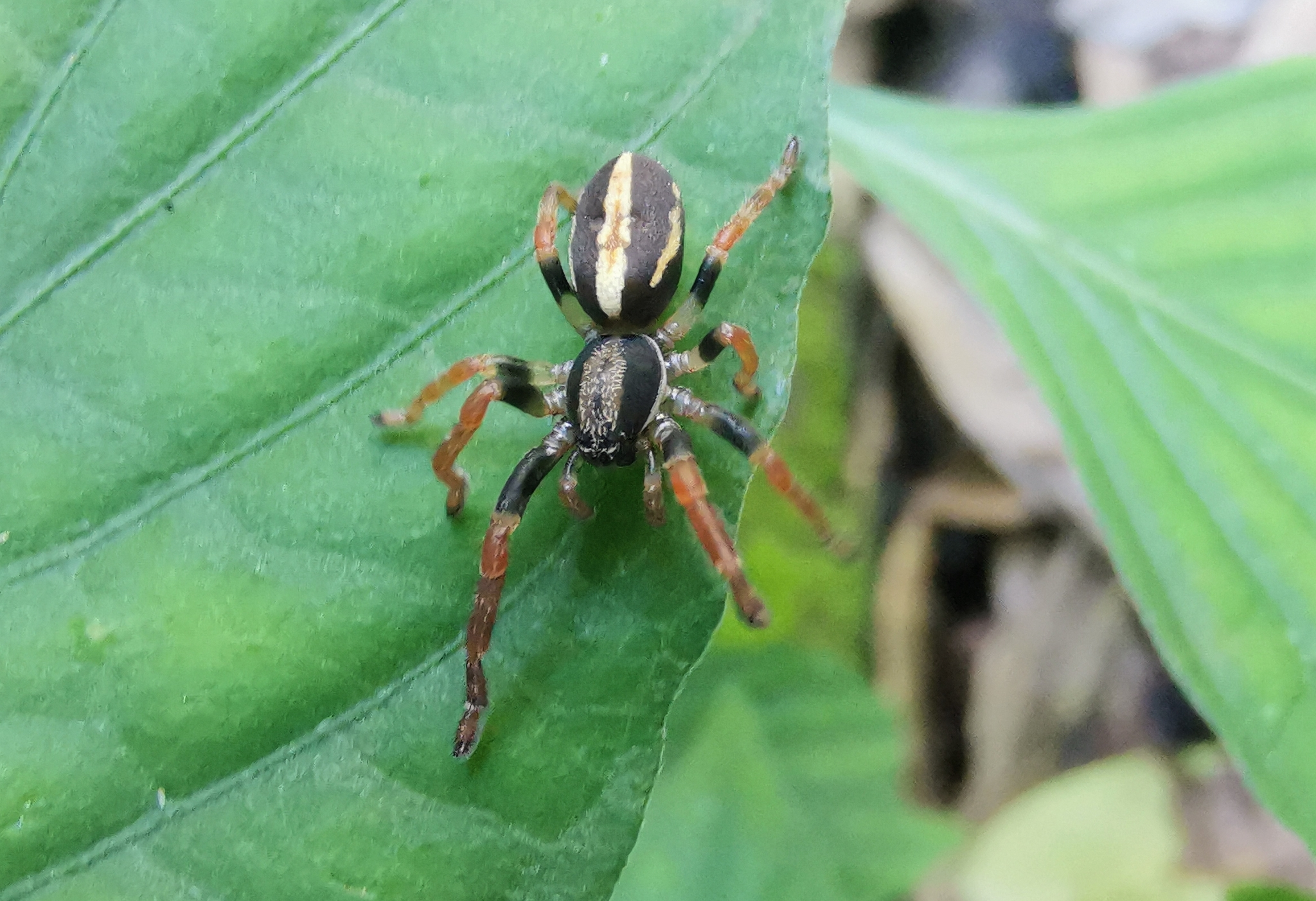
- Storenomorpha reinholdae

Scientific classification
- Kingdom: Animalia
- Phylum: Arthropoda
- Subphylum: Chelicerata
- Class: Arachnida
- Order: Araneae
- Infraorder: Araneomorphae
- Family: Zodariidae
- Genus: Storenomorpha; Simon

Type species
- Storenomorpha comottoi

Species
- 17, see text

= Storenomorpha =

Genus of spiders

Storenomorpha is a genus of spiders in the family Zodariidae. It was first described in 1884 by Simon. As of 2021, it contains 17 species, all from Asia.

== Species ==
Storenomorpha comprises the following species:

- S. abramovi Logunov, 2010 — Vietnam
- S. anne Jäger, 2007 — Laos
- S. arboccoae Jocqué & Bosmans, 1989 — Myanmar
- S. comottoi Simon, 1884 (type) — Myanmar
- S. dejiangensis Jiang, Guo, Yu & Chen, 2016 — China
- S. falcata Zhang & Zhu, 2010 — China
- S. hainanensis Jin & Chen, 2009 — China
- S. hongfuchui (Barrion, Barrion-Dupo & Heong, 2013) — China (Hainan)
- S. joyaus (Tikader, 1970) — India
- S. lushanensis Yu & Chen, 2009 — China
- S. nupta Jocqué & Bosmans, 1989 — Myanmar
- S. paguma Grismado & Ramírez, 2004 — Vietnam
- S. raghavai (Patel & Reddy, 1991) — India
- S. reinholdae Jocqué & Bosmans, 1989 — Thailand
- S. stellmaculata Zhang & Zhu, 2010 — China
- S. yizhang Yin & Bao, 2008 — China
- S. yunnan Yin & Bao, 2008 — China
