= Amphiledorus =

Scientific classification
- Domain: Eukaryota
- Kingdom: Animalia
- Phylum: Arthropoda
- Subphylum: Chelicerata
- Class: Arachnida
- Order: Araneae
- Infraorder: Araneomorphae
- Family: Zodariidae
- Genus: Amphiledorus; Bosmans

Type species
- Amphiledorus balnearius

Species
- Amphiledorus adonis Jocqué & Bosmans, 2001 - Portugal; Amphiledorus balnearius Jocqué & Bosmans, 2001 - Spain. Algeria; Amphiledorus histrionicus (Simon, 1884) - Algeria, Tunisia; Amphiledorus ungoliantae Pekár & Cardoso, 2005 - Portugal

Genus of spiders

Amphiledorus is a genus of spiders in the family Zodariidae. It was first described in 2001 by Jocqué & Bosmans. As of 2017, it contains 4 species.
