= Cavasteron =

Scientific classification
- Kingdom: Animalia
- Phylum: Arthropoda
- Subphylum: Chelicerata
- Class: Arachnida
- Order: Araneae
- Infraorder: Araneomorphae
- Family: Zodariidae
- Genus: Cavasteron; Baehr & Jocqué, 2000

Type species
- C. crassicalcar (Baehr & Jocqué, 2000)

Species
- 12, see text

Genus of spiders

Cavasteron is a genus of spiders in the family Zodariidae. It was first described in 2000 by Barbara Baehr & Rudy Jocqué. As of 2024, it contains 12 species, all from Australia.

== Species ==
Cavasteron comprises the following species:

- Cavasteron agelenoides Baehr & Jocqué, 2000 - Queensland
- Cavasteron atriceps Baehr & Jocqué, 2000 - South Australia
- Cavasteron crassicalcar Baehr & Jocqué, 2000 (type)- Western Australia, South Australia
- Cavasteron exquisitum Baehr & Jocqué, 2000 - South Australia, Queensland
- Cavasteron guttulatum Baehr & Jocqué, 2000 - South Australia
- Cavasteron index Baehr & Jocqué, 2000 - Northern Territory
- Cavasteron lacertae Baehr & Jocqué, 2000 - Northern Territory, South Australia, Queensland
- Cavasteron margaretae Baehr & Jocqué, 2000 - Western Australia
- Cavasteron martini Baehr & Jocqué, 2000 - Western Australia
- Cavasteron mjoebergi Baehr & Jocqué, 2000 - Western Australia
- Cavasteron tenuicalcar Baehr & Jocqué, 2000 - Western Australia
- Cavasteron triunguis Baehr & Jocqué, 2000 - Queensland
