= Antillorena =

Scientific classification
- Kingdom: Animalia
- Phylum: Arthropoda
- Subphylum: Chelicerata
- Class: Arachnida
- Order: Araneae
- Infraorder: Araneomorphae
- Family: Zodariidae
- Genus: Antillorena; Jocqué, 1991

Type species
- Antillorena polli

Species
- Antillorena gaia Brescovit & Ruiz, 2011 - Brazil; Antillorena patapata Brescovit & Ruiz, 2011 - Brazil; Antillorena polli (Simon, 1887) - Lesser Antilles; Antillorena sanjacintensis Quijano-Cuervo & Brescovit, 2018 - Colombia

Genus of spiders

Antillorena is a genus of spiders in the family Zodariidae. It was first described in 1991 by Rudy Jocqué. As of November 2024, it contains 4 species.
