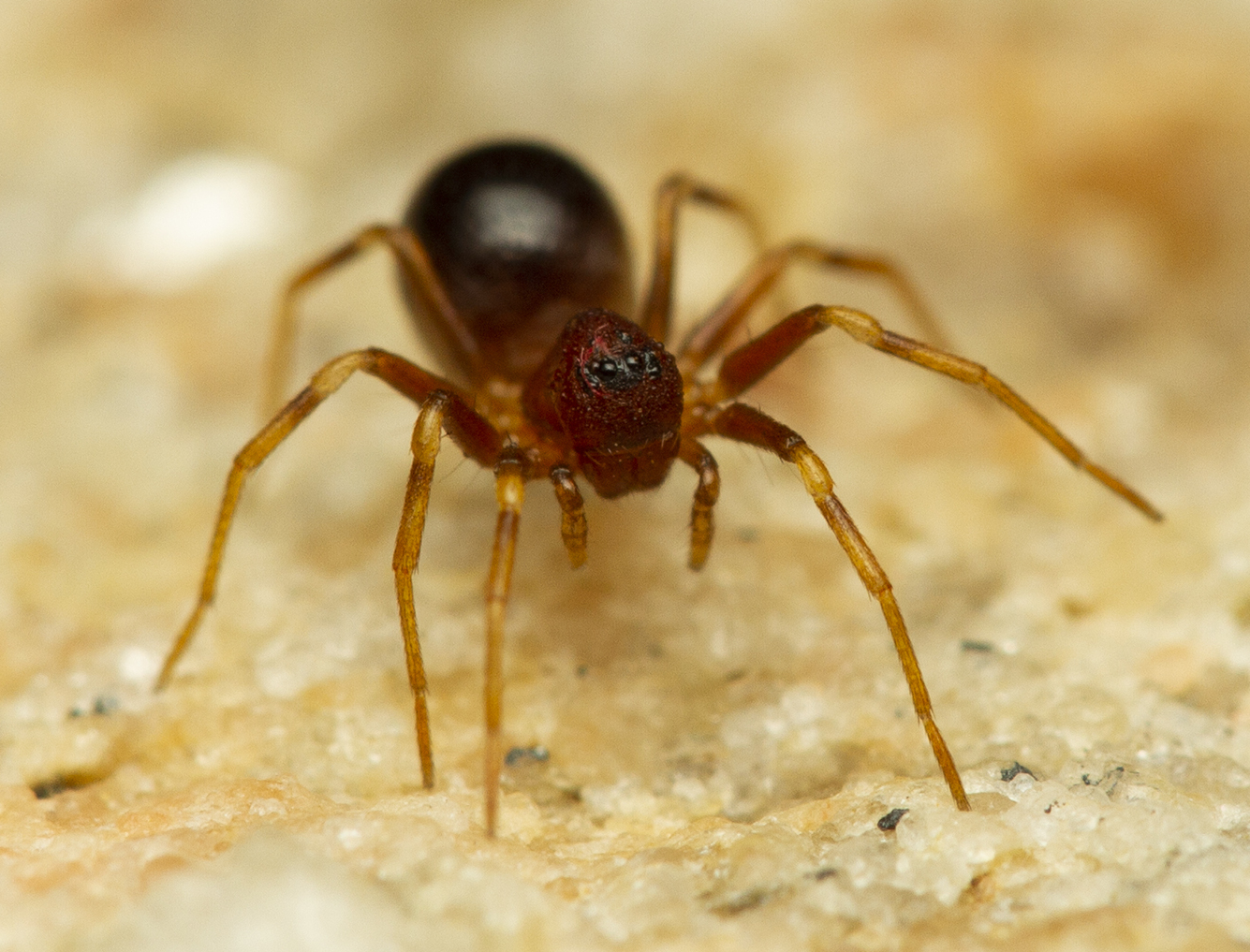
- female

Scientific classification
- Kingdom: Animalia
- Phylum: Arthropoda
- Subphylum: Chelicerata
- Class: Arachnida
- Order: Araneae
- Infraorder: Araneomorphae
- Family: Zodariidae
- Genus: Mallinus
- Species: M. nitidiventris

Binomial name
- Mallinus nitidiventris Simon, 1893

= Mallinus =

Mallinus zodariid spider

Genus of spiders

Mallinus nitidiventris is a species of spider in the family Zodariidae. It is the sole species in the monotypic genus Mallinus and is endemic to South Africa, commonly known as the Mallinus zodariid spider.

== Distribution ==
Mallinus nitidiventris occurs across multiple provinces in South Africa, including the Free State, Eastern Cape, Northern Cape, and Western Cape. Notable localities include Matjiesfontein, Tswalu Kalahari Reserve, Goegap Nature Reserve, and various farms around Aberdeen.

== Habitat ==
The species is a free-running ground spider that forages in open ground. It has been observed in the vicinity of various ant species and has been recorded feeding on ants. The species occurs at various altitudes and has been collected using pitfall traps.

== Description ==
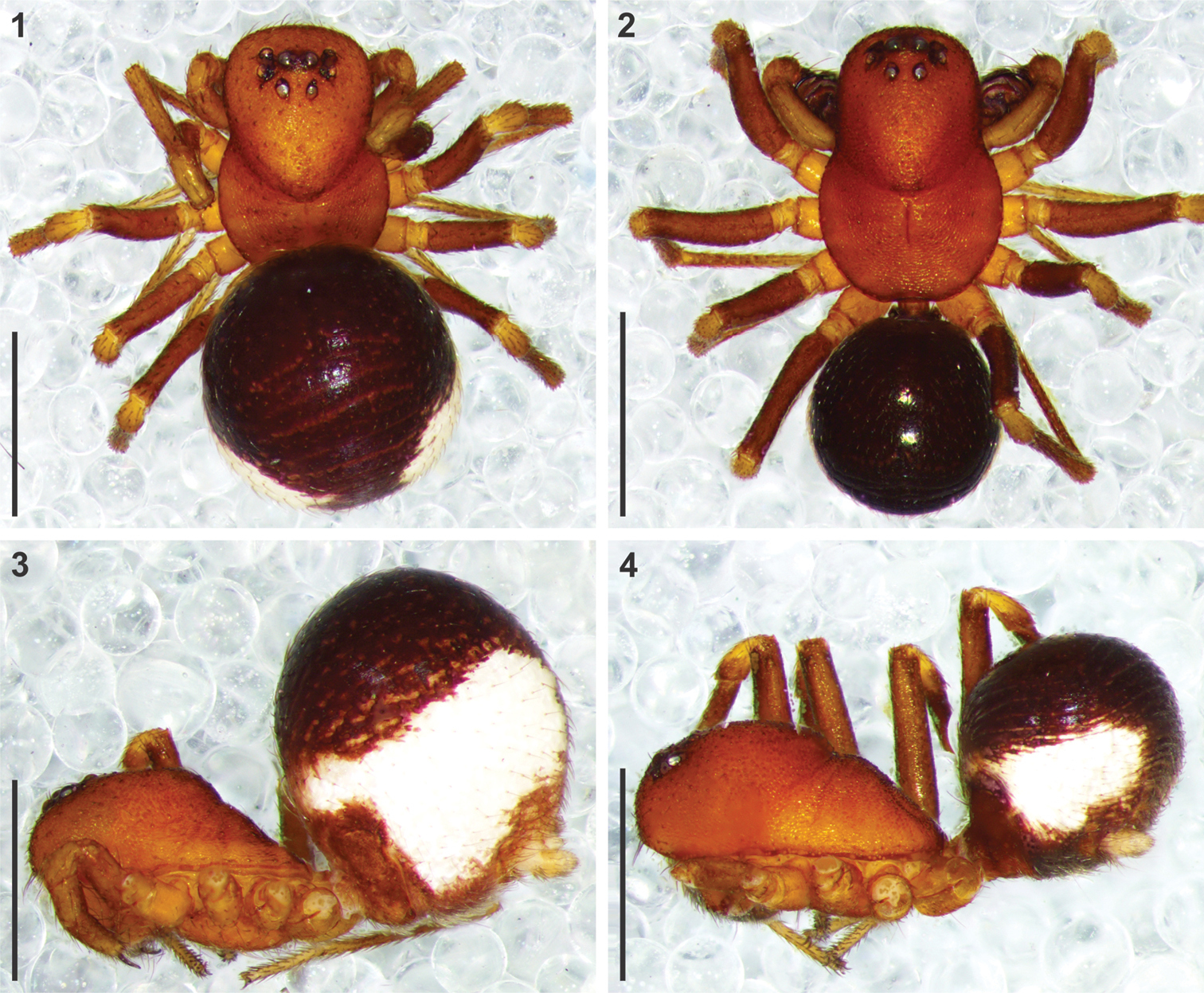
Mallinus nitidiventris

Mallinus nitidiventris is a small spider with a total length ranging from 2.13 to 2.72 mm. It can be distinguished from other zodariine spiders by the relatively smaller size of the anterior median eyes.

The carapace shows strong granulation and the opisthosoma is very globose, usually higher than long in both sexes. The species has circumferential folds laterally and a shiny scutum covering the dorsum in both sexes. Populations from southwestern parts of the range have a clearly darker carapace and wine-red legs.

== Ecology ==
Mallinus nitidiventris has been observed foraging in the vicinity of various ant species including Anoplolepis custodiens, Camponotus spp., Messor sp., and Monomorium sp. The species appears to be an ant specialist, with observations of it feeding on ants in the field.

== Conservation ==
The species is listed as Least Concern by the South African National Biodiversity Institute. It is protected in Tswalu Kalahari Reserve and Goegap Nature Reserve. The species was previously listed as Data Deficient until both sexes were redescribed in 2019.
