= Parazodarion =

Scientific classification
- Kingdom: Animalia
- Phylum: Arthropoda
- Subphylum: Chelicerata
- Class: Arachnida
- Order: Araneae
- Infraorder: Araneomorphae
- Family: Zodariidae
- Genus: Parazodarion
- Species: P. raddei

Binomial name
- Parazodarion raddei (Simon, 1889)

Genus of spiders

Parazodarion is a genus of spiders in the family Zodariidae. It was first described in 2009 by Ovtchinnikov, Ahmad & Gurko. As of 2017, it contains only one species, Parazodarion raddei, found in central Asia.
