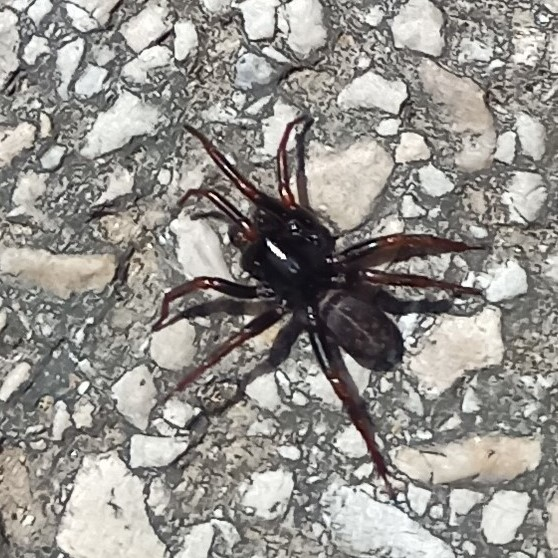
- Selamia reticulata

Scientific classification
- Kingdom: Animalia
- Phylum: Arthropoda
- Subphylum: Chelicerata
- Class: Arachnida
- Order: Araneae
- Infraorder: Araneomorphae
- Family: Zodariidae
- Genus: Selamia; Simon

Type species
- Selamia reticulata

Species
- Selamia numidica Jocqué & Bosmans, 2001; Selamia reticulata (Simon, 1870); Selamia tribulosa (Simon, 1909)

= Selamia =

Genus of spiders

Selamia is a genus of spiders in the family Zodariidae. It was first described in 1873 by Simon. As of 2017, it contains three species native to the Mediterranean.
