= Heliconilla =

Scientific classification
- Kingdom: Animalia
- Phylum: Arthropoda
- Subphylum: Chelicerata
- Class: Arachnida
- Order: Araneae
- Infraorder: Araneomorphae
- Family: Zodariidae
- Genus: Heliconilla; Singtripop

Type species
- Heliconilla thaleri

Species
- 9, see text

Genus of spiders

Heliconilla is a genus of spiders in the family Zodariidae. It was first described in 2012 by Dankittipakul, Jocqué & Singtripop. As of 2017, it contains nine Asian species.

== Species ==
Heliconilla comprises the following species:

- H. aculeata Dankittipakul, Jocqué & Singtripop, 2012 — Thailand
- H. cochleata Dankittipakul, Jocqué & Singtripop, 2012 — Vietnam
- H. crassa Dankittipakul, Jocqué & Singtripop, 2012 — Thailand
- H. furcata Dankittipakul, Jocqué & Singtripop, 2012 — Thailand
- H. globularis Dankittipakul, Jocqué & Singtripop, 2012 — Thailand, Malaysia, Singapore
- H. irrorata (Thorell, 1887) — Myanmar
- H. mesopetala Dankittipakul, Jocqué & Singtripop, 2012 — Myanmar, Thailand
- H. oblonga (Zhang & Zhu, 2009) — China, Thailand
- H. thaleri (Dankittipakul & Schwendinger, 2009) (type) — Thailand
