= Aschema =

Scientific classification
- Kingdom: Animalia
- Phylum: Arthropoda
- Subphylum: Chelicerata
- Class: Arachnida
- Order: Araneae
- Infraorder: Araneomorphae
- Family: Zodariidae
- Genus: Aschema; Jocqué, 1991

Type species
- Aschema pallida

Species
- Aschema madagascariensis (Strand, 1907); Aschema pallida Jocqué, 1991

Genus of spiders

Aschema is a genus of spiders in the family Zodariidae. It was first described in 1991 by Rudy Jocqué. As of November 2024, it contains 2 species, both found in Madagascar.
