= Pentasteron =

Scientific classification
- Kingdom: Animalia
- Phylum: Arthropoda
- Subphylum: Chelicerata
- Class: Arachnida
- Order: Araneae
- Infraorder: Araneomorphae
- Family: Zodariidae
- Genus: Pentasteron; Jocqué

Type species
- Pentasteron simplex

Species
- 8, see text

Genus of spiders

Pentasteron is a genus of spiders in the family Zodariidae. It was first described in 2001 by Baehr & Jocqué. As of 2017, it contains 8 Australian species.

== Species ==
Pentasteron comprises 8 species:

- P. intermedium Baehr & Jocqué, 2001 — Southern Australia
- P. isobelae Baehr & Jocqué, 2001 — Australia (Queensland, New South Wales)
- P. oscitans Baehr & Jocqué, 2001 — Australia (New South Wales)
- P. parasimplex Baehr & Jocqué, 2001 — Australia (Victoria)
- P. securifer Baehr & Jocqué, 2001 — Australia (Western Australia)
- P. simplex Baehr & Jocqué, 2001 (type) — Australia (Queensland, New South Wales)
- P. sordidum Baehr & Jocqué, 2001 — Australia (New South Wales, Victoria)
- P. storosoides Baehr & Jocqué, 2001 — Australia (New South Wales, Victoria)
