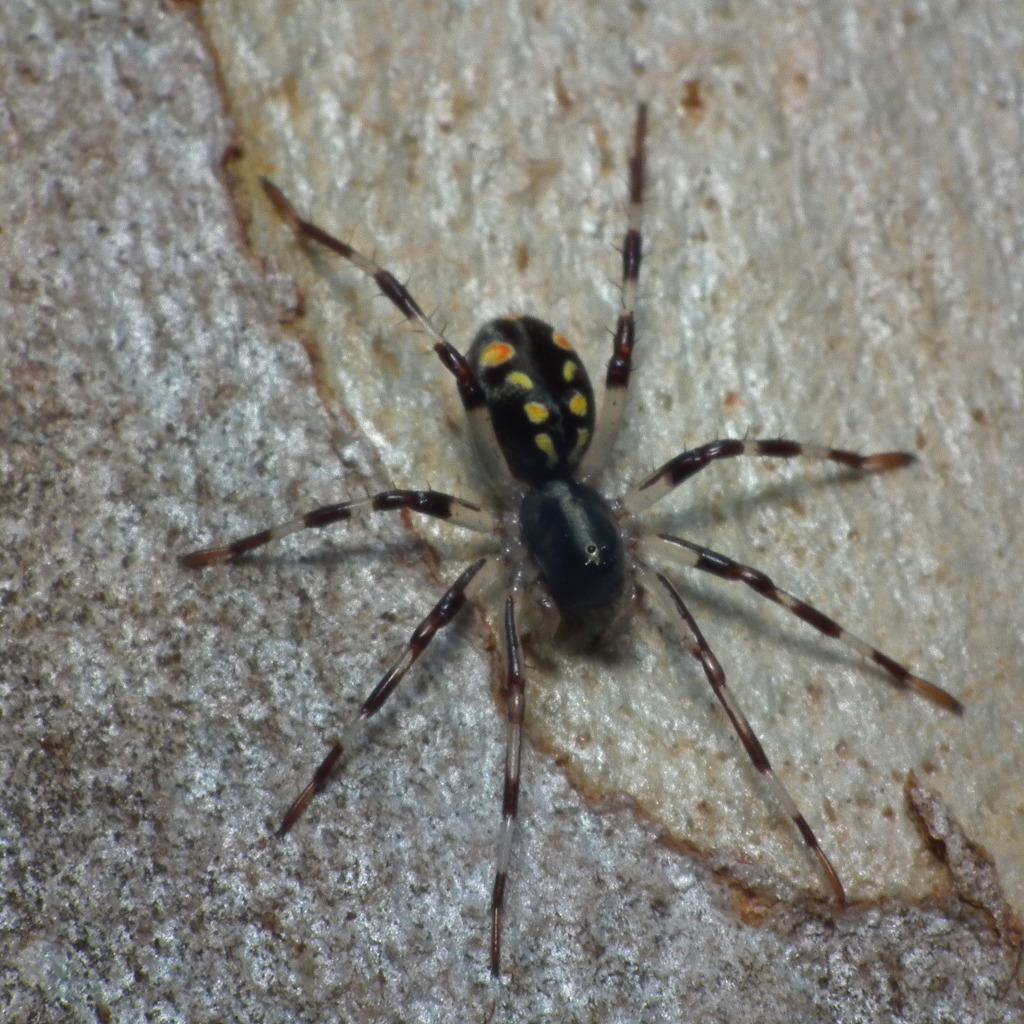
- S. daviesae

Scientific classification
- Kingdom: Animalia
- Phylum: Arthropoda
- Subphylum: Chelicerata
- Class: Arachnida
- Order: Araneae
- Infraorder: Araneomorphae
- Family: Zodariidae
- Genus: Subasteron
- Species: S. daviesae

Binomial name
- Subasteron daviesae Baehr & Jocqué, 2001

= Subasteron =

Genus of spiders

Subasteron is a genus of spiders in the family Zodariidae. It was first described in 2001 by Baehr & Jocqué. As of 2017, it contains only one species, Subasteron daviesae, also known by the vernacular name Davies' ant spider, which is found in Queensland and New South Wales.
