= Microdiores =

Scientific classification
- Kingdom: Animalia
- Phylum: Arthropoda
- Subphylum: Chelicerata
- Class: Arachnida
- Order: Araneae
- Infraorder: Araneomorphae
- Family: Zodariidae
- Genus: Microdiores; Jocqué

Type species
- Microdiores chowo

Species
- Microdiores aurantioviolaceus Nzigidahera & Jocqué, 2010; Microdiores chowo Jocqué, 1987; Microdiores rwegura Nzigidahera & Jocqué, 2010; Microdiores violaceus Nzigidahera & Jocqué, 2010

Genus of spiders

Microdiores is a genus of spiders in the family Zodariidae. It was first described in 1987 by Jocqué. As of 2017, it contains 4 African species.
