= Euryeidon =

Scientific classification
- Kingdom: Animalia
- Phylum: Arthropoda
- Subphylum: Chelicerata
- Class: Arachnida
- Order: Araneae
- Infraorder: Araneomorphae
- Family: Zodariidae
- Genus: Euryeidon; Jocqué

Type species
- Euryeidon monticola

Species
- 6, see text

Genus of spiders

Euryeidon is a genus of spiders in the family Zodariidae. It was first described in 2004 by Dankittipakul & Jocqué. As of 2017, it contains 6 species, all from Thailand.

== Species ==
Euryeidon comprises the following species:

- Euryeidon anthonyi Dankittipakul & Jocqué, 2004
- Euryeidon consideratum Dankittipakul & Jocqué, 2004
- Euryeidon monticola Dankittipakul & Jocqué, 2004
- Euryeidon musicum Dankittipakul & Jocqué, 2004
- Euryeidon schwendingeri Dankittipakul & Jocqué, 2004
- Euryeidon sonthichaiae Dankittipakul & Jocqué, 2004
