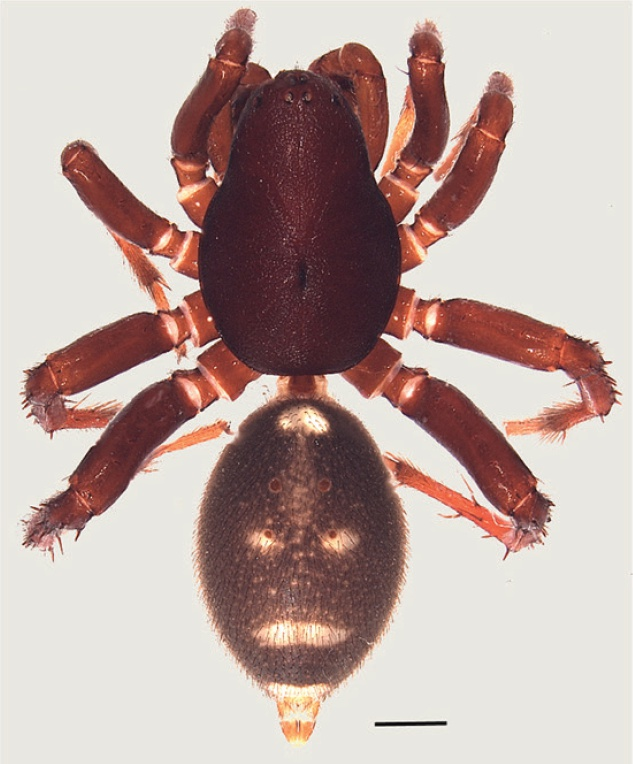
- P. morogorom, male

Scientific classification
- Kingdom: Animalia
- Phylum: Arthropoda
- Subphylum: Chelicerata
- Class: Arachnida
- Order: Araneae
- Infraorder: Araneomorphae
- Family: Zodariidae
- Genus: Palindroma; Jocqué & Henrard, 2015

Type species
- Palindroma morogorom Jocqué & Henrard, 2015

= Palindroma =

Genus of spiders

Palindroma is a genus of spiders in the family Zodariidae. The five species of Palindroma are found in central and eastern Africa, including Tanzania, Malawi, and the Democratic Republic of Congo, and individuals range from 7.5–10 mm (0.30–0.39 in) in body length. The specific name of each species (Palindroma aleykyela, P. avonova, P. morogorom, P. obmoimiombo, and P. sinis) is a palindrome, a word that reads the same backwards or forwards.
