= Suffrica =

Scientific classification
- Domain: Eukaryota
- Kingdom: Animalia
- Phylum: Arthropoda
- Subphylum: Chelicerata
- Class: Arachnida
- Order: Araneae
- Infraorder: Araneomorphae
- Family: Zodariidae
- Genus: Suffrica; Jocqué

Type species
- Suffrica exotica

Species
- Suffrica chawia Henrard & Jocqué, 2015; Suffrica exotica Henrard & Jocqué, 2015; Suffrica gus Henrard & Jocqué, 2015

Genus of spiders

Suffrica is a genus of spiders in the family Zodariidae. It was first described in 2015 by Henrard & Jocqué. As of 2017, it contains 3 species from Kenya and Tanzania.
