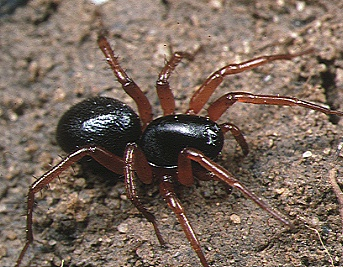
- Female Mallinella fulvipes

Scientific classification
- Kingdom: Animalia
- Phylum: Arthropoda
- Subphylum: Chelicerata
- Class: Arachnida
- Order: Araneae
- Infraorder: Araneomorphae
- Family: Zodariidae
- Genus: Mallinella; Strand, 1906

= Mallinella =

Genus of spiders

Mallinella is a genus of spider in the family Zodariidae.

== Species ==
As of December 2022, the World Spider Catalog accepted 218 species:

- Mallinella abdita Dankittipakul, Jocqué & Singtripop, 2010 – Borneo
- Mallinella abnormis Dankittipakul, Jocqué & Singtripop, 2012 – Malaysia
- Mallinella acanthoclada Dankittipakul, Jocqué & Singtripop, 2012 – Thailand
- Mallinella acroscopica Dankittipakul, Jocqué & Singtripop, 2012 – Java
- Mallinella adonis Dankittipakul, Jocqué & Singtripop, 2012 – Malaysia
- Mallinella advena Dankittipakul, Jocqué & Singtripop, 2012 – Thailand
- Mallinella albomaculata (Bosmans & Hillyard, 1990) – Borneo, Sulawesi
- Mallinella albotibialis (Bosmans & van Hove, 1986) – Cameroon
- Mallinella allantoides Dankittipakul, Jocqué & Singtripop, 2012 – Thailand
- Mallinella allorostrata Dankittipakul, Jocqué & Singtripop, 2012 – Malaysia, Singapore
- Mallinella alonalon Lualhati-Caurez & Barrion, 2020 – Philippines (Luzon)
- Mallinella alticola Dankittipakul, Jocqué & Singtripop, 2012 – Thailand
- Mallinella amblyrhyncha Dankittipakul, Jocqué & Singtripop, 2012 – Malaysia
- Mallinella ampliata Dankittipakul, Jocqué & Singtripop, 2012 – Vietnam
- Mallinella angoonae Dankittipakul, Jocqué & Singtripop, 2012 – Malaysia
- Mallinella angulosa Dankittipakul, Jocqué & Singtripop, 2012 – Malaysia
- Mallinella angustata Dankittipakul, Jocqué & Singtripop, 2012 – Borneo
- Mallinella angustissima Dankittipakul, Jocqué & Singtripop, 2012 – Malaysia
- Mallinella annulipes (Thorell, 1892) – Malaysia, Singapore, Indonesia
- Mallinella apiculata Dankittipakul, Jocqué & Singtripop, 2012 – Malaysia
- Mallinella apodysocrina Dankittipakul, Jocqué & Singtripop, 2012 – New Guinea
- Mallinella atromarginata Dankittipakul, Jocqué & Singtripop, 2012 – Thailand
- Mallinella axillocrina Dankittipakul, Jocqué & Singtripop, 2012 – Solomon Is.
- Mallinella bandamaensis (Jézéquel, 1964) – Ivory Coast
- Mallinella beauforti (Kulczyński, 1911) – New Guinea
- Mallinella belladonna Dankittipakul, Jocqué & Singtripop, 2012 – Sumatra
- Mallinella bicanaliculata (B. S. Zhang & F. Zhang, 2019) – Malaysia (Borneo)
- Mallinella bicolor (Jézéquel, 1964) – Ivory Coast
- Mallinella bidenticulata Dankittipakul, Jocqué & Singtripop, 2012 – Thailand
- Mallinella bifida Dankittipakul, Jocqué & Singtripop, 2010 – Borneo
- Mallinella bifurcata Wang et al., 2009 – China
- Mallinella bigemina Dankittipakul, Jocqué & Singtripop, 2012 – Borneo
- Mallinella birostrata Dankittipakul, Jocqué & Singtripop, 2012 – Borneo
- Mallinella biumbonalia Wang et al., 2009 – China
- Mallinella bosmansi Nzigidahera, Desnyder & Jocqué, 2011 – Cameroon
- Mallinella brachiata Dankittipakul, Jocqué & Singtripop, 2012 – Thailand
- Mallinella brachyrhyncha Dankittipakul, Jocqué & Singtripop, 2012 – Malaysia
- Mallinella brachytheca Dankittipakul, Jocqué & Singtripop, 2012 – Borneo
- Mallinella brunneofusca Dankittipakul, Jocqué & Singtripop, 2012 – Thailand
- Mallinella calautica (B. S. Zhang & F. Zhang, 2019) – Malaysia (Borneo)
- Mallinella calicoanensis Dankittipakul, Jocqué & Singtripop, 2012 – Philippines
- Mallinella calilungae (Barrion & Litsinger, 1992) – Philippines
- Mallinella callicera Dankittipakul, Jocqué & Singtripop, 2012 – Thailand
- Mallinella cameroonensis (van Hove & Bosmans, 1984) – Cameroon
- Mallinella caperata Dankittipakul, Jocqué & Singtripop, 2012 – Sumatra
- Mallinella capitulata Dankittipakul, Jocqué & Singtripop, 2012 – Thailand
- Mallinella chengjiaani (Barrion, Barrion-Dupo & Heong, 2013) – China (Hainan)
- Mallinella cirrifera Dankittipakul, Jocqué & Singtripop, 2012 – Sumatra
- Mallinella clavigera Dankittipakul, Jocqué & Singtripop, 2012 – Sumatra
- Mallinella comitata Dankittipakul, Jocqué & Singtripop, 2012 – Borneo
- Mallinella concava Dankittipakul, Jocqué & Singtripop, 2012 – Sumatra
- Mallinella consona Logunov, 2010 – Vietnam
- Mallinella convolutiva Dankittipakul, Jocqué & Singtripop, 2012 – Vietnam
- Mallinella cordiformis Dankittipakul, Jocqué & Singtripop, 2012 – Sumatra
- Mallinella cryptocera Dankittipakul, Jocqué & Singtripop, 2012 – Thailand
- Mallinella cryptomembrana Dankittipakul, Jocqué & Singtripop, 2012 – New Guinea
- Mallinella cuspidata Dankittipakul, Jocqué & Singtripop, 2012 – Sumatra
- Mallinella cuspidatissima Dankittipakul, Jocqué & Singtripop, 2012 – Sumatra
- Mallinella cymbiforma Wang, Yin & Peng, 2009 – China
- Mallinella dambrica Ono, 2004 – Vietnam
- Mallinella debeiri (Bosmans & van Hove, 1986) – Cameroon
- Mallinella decorata (Thorell, 1895) – Myanmar
- Mallinella decurtata (Thorell, 1899) – Cameroon
- Mallinella denticulata Dankittipakul, Jocqué & Singtripop, 2012 – Malaysia
- Mallinella dibangensis (Biswas & Biswas, 2006) – India
- Mallinella digitata Zhang, Zhang & Chen, 2011 – China
- Mallinella dinghu Song & Kim, 1997 – China
- Mallinella dolichobilobata Dankittipakul, Jocqué & Singtripop, 2012 – Malaysia
- Mallinella dolichorhyncha Dankittipakul, Jocqué & Singtripop, 2012 – Malaysia
- Mallinella dumogabonensis (Bosmans & Hillyard, 1990) – Sulawesi
- Mallinella elegans Dankittipakul, Jocqué & Singtripop, 2012 – Malaysia
- Mallinella elongata Dankittipakul, Jocqué & Singtripop, 2012 – Malaysia
- Mallinella erratica (Ono, 1983) – Nepal
- Mallinella etindei (van Hove & Bosmans, 1984) – Cameroon
- Mallinella exornata (Thorell, 1887) – Myanmar
- Mallinella fasciata (Kulczyński, 1911) – Malaysia, Java, Bali
- Mallinella filicata Dankittipakul, Jocqué & Singtripop, 2012 – Thailand
- Mallinella filifera Dankittipakul, Jocqué & Singtripop, 2012 – Sumatra
- Mallinella flabellata Dankittipakul, Jocqué & Singtripop, 2012 – Borneo
- Mallinella flabelliformis Dankittipakul, Jocqué & Singtripop, 2012 – Malaysia
- Mallinella flagelliformis Dankittipakul, Jocqué & Singtripop, 2012 – Borneo
- Mallinella fronto (Thorell, 1887) – Myanmar
- Mallinella fulvipes (Ono & Tanikawa, 1990) – Ryukyu Is.
- Mallinella galyaniae Dankittipakul, Jocqué & Singtripop, 2012 – Thailand
- Mallinella glomerata Dankittipakul, Jocqué & Singtripop, 2012 – Thailand
- Mallinella gombakensis Ono & Hashim, 2008 – Malaysia
- Mallinella gongi Bao & Yin, 2002 – China
- Mallinella hainan Song & Kim, 1997 – China
- Mallinella hamata (Bosmans & Hillyard, 1990) – Sulawesi
- Mallinella hilaris (Thorell, 1890) – Java
- Mallinella hingstoni (Brignoli, 1982) – China
- Mallinella hoangliena Logunov, 2010 – Vietnam
- Mallinella hoosi (Kishida, 1935) – Japan
- Mallinella immaculata Zhang & Zhu, 2009 – China, Thailand
- Mallinella inflata (Bosmans & van Hove, 1986) – Cameroon
- Mallinella innovata Dankittipakul, Jocqué & Singtripop, 2012 – Thailand
- Mallinella insolita Dankittipakul, Jocqué & Singtripop, 2012 – Thailand
- Mallinella insulana Dankittipakul, Jocqué & Singtripop, 2010 – Bali
- Mallinella jaegeri Dankittipakul, Jocqué & Singtripop, 2012 – Malaysia
- Mallinella karubei Ono, 2003 – Vietnam
- Mallinella kelvini (Bosmans & Hillyard, 1990) – Sulawesi
- Mallinella khanhoa Logunov, 2010 – Vietnam
- Mallinella kibonotensis (Bosmans & van Hove, 1986) – Kenya, Tanzania
- Mallinella klossi (Hogg, 1922) – Vietnam
- Mallinella koupensis (Bosmans & van Hove, 1986) – Cameroon
- Mallinella kritscheri Dankittipakul, Jocqué & Singtripop, 2012 – Sumatra
- Mallinella kunmingensis Wang et al., 2009 – China
- Mallinella labialis Song & Kim, 1997 – China
- Mallinella langping Zhang & Zhu, 2009 – China
- Mallinella laxa (B. S. Zhang & F. Zhang, 2019) – Malaysia (Borneo)
- Mallinella leonardi (Simon, 1907) – Príncipe
- Mallinella leptoclada Dankittipakul, Jocqué & Singtripop, 2012 – Malaysia
- Mallinella linguiformis Dankittipakul, Jocqué & Singtripop, 2012 – Thailand
- Mallinella liuyang Yin & Yan, 2001 – China
- Mallinella lobata (Bosmans & Hillyard, 1990) – Sulawesi
- Mallinella longipoda Dankittipakul, Jocqué & Singtripop, 2012 – Borneo
- Mallinella maculata Strand, 1906 (type species) – Ethiopia
- Mallinella manengoubensis (Bosmans & van Hove, 1986) – Cameroon
- Mallinella maolanensis Wang, Ran & Chen, 1999 – China
- Mallinella martensi (Ono, 1983) – Nepal
- Mallinella maruyamai Ono & Hashim, 2008 – Malaysia
- Mallinella mbaboensis (Bosmans & van Hove, 1986) – Cameroon
- Mallinella mbamensis (Bosmans & van Hove, 1986) – Cameroon
- Mallinella melanognatha (Hasselt, 1882) – Sumatra
- Mallinella meriani (Bosmans & Hillyard, 1990) – Sulawesi
- Mallinella merimbunenis Koh & Dankittipakul, 2014 – Borneo
- Mallinella microcera Dankittipakul, Jocqué & Singtripop, 2012 – Vietnam
- Mallinella microleuca Dankittipakul, Jocqué & Singtripop, 2012 – Malaysia
- Mallinella microtheca Dankittipakul, Jocqué & Singtripop, 2012 – Malaysia
- Mallinella montana Dankittipakul, Jocqué & Singtripop, 2012 – Thailand
- Mallinella monticola (van Hove & Bosmans, 1984) – Cameroon
- Mallinella mucocrina Dankittipakul, Jocqué & Singtripop, 2012 – Solomon Is.
- Mallinella multicornis Dankittipakul, Jocqué & Singtripop, 2012 – Malaysia
- Mallinella murphyorum Dankittipakul, Jocqué & Singtripop, 2012 – Malaysia
- Mallinella myrmecophaga Koh & Dankittipakul, 2014 – Borneo
- Mallinella nepalensis (Ono, 1983) – Nepal
- Mallinella ngoclinha Logunov, 2010 – Vietnam
- Mallinella nigra (Bosmans & Hillyard, 1990) – Sulawesi
- Mallinella nilgherina (Simon, 1906) – India
- Mallinella nomurai Ono, 2003 – Vietnam
- Mallinella nyikae (Pocock, 1898) – Malawi
- Mallinella obliqua (B. S. Zhang & F. Zhang, 2019) – Malaysia (Borneo)
- Mallinella obtusa Zhang, Zhang & Chen, 2011 – China
- Mallinella octosignata (Simon, 1903) – Bioko
- Mallinella oculobella Dankittipakul, Jocqué & Singtripop, 2012 – Thailand
- Mallinella okinawaensis Tanikawa, 2005 – Japan
- Mallinella okuensis (Bosmans & van Hove, 1986) – Cameroon
- Mallinella onoi Dankittipakul, Jocqué & Singtripop, 2012 – Sumatra
- Mallinella oscari Dankittipakul, Jocqué & Singtripop, 2012 – Thailand
- Mallinella panchoi (Barrion & Litsinger, 1992) – Philippines
- Mallinella pantianensis (Zhong, Chen & Liu, 2022) – China
- Mallinella parabifurcata (Zhong, Chen & Liu, 2022) – China
- Mallinella pectinata Dankittipakul, Jocqué & Singtripop, 2012 – Malaysia, Borneo, Bintan Is.
- Mallinella peculiaris Dankittipakul, Jocqué & Singtripop, 2012 – Thailand
- Mallinella phansipana Logunov, 2010 – Vietnam
- Mallinella platycera Dankittipakul, Jocqué & Singtripop, 2012 – Thailand
- Mallinella platyrhyncha Koh & Dankittipakul, 2014 – Borneo
- Mallinella pluma Jin & Zhang, 2013 – China
- Mallinella ponikii (Bosmans & Hillyard, 1990) – Sulawesi
- Mallinella ponikioides (Bosmans & Hillyard, 1990) – Sulawesi
- Mallinella preoboscidea Dankittipakul, Jocqué & Singtripop, 2012 – New Guinea
- Mallinella pricei (Barrion & Litsinger, 1995) – Philippines
- Mallinella pseudokunmingensis (Yu & Zhang, 2019) – China
- Mallinella pulchra (Bosmans & Hillyard, 1990) – Sulawesi
- Mallinella punctata Dankittipakul, Jocqué & Singtripop, 2012 – Borneo
- Mallinella raniformis Dankittipakul, Jocqué & Singtripop, 2012 – Thailand
- Mallinella rectangulata Zhang, Zhang & Chen, 2011 – China
- Mallinella redimita (Simon, 1905) – India, Sri Lanka
- Mallinella reinholdae Dankittipakul, Jocqué & Singtripop, 2012 – Sumatra
- Mallinella renaria (B. S. Zhang & F. Zhang, 2018) – Laos
- Mallinella robusta Dankittipakul, Jocqué & Singtripop, 2012 – Malaysia
- Mallinella rolini Dankittipakul, Jocqué & Singtripop, 2012 – Malaysia
- Mallinella rostrata Dankittipakul, Jocqué & Singtripop, 2012 – Thailand
- Mallinella sadamotoi (Ono & Tanikawa, 1990) – Ryukyu Is.
- Mallinella scapigera Dankittipakul, Jocqué & Singtripop, 2012 – Thailand
- Mallinella scharffi Dankittipakul, Jocqué & Singtripop, 2012 – Borneo
- Mallinella sciophana (Simon, 1901) – Malaysia, Sumatra
- Mallinella selecta (Pavesi, 1895) – Ethiopia
- Mallinella septemmaculata Ono, 2004 – Vietnam
- Mallinella shimojanai (Ono & Tanikawa, 1990) – Ryukyu Is.
- Mallinella shuqiangi Dankittipakul, Jocqué & Singtripop, 2012 – China
- Mallinella silva Dankittipakul, Jocqué & Singtripop, 2012 – Thailand
- Mallinella simillima Dankittipakul, Jocqué & Singtripop, 2012 – Malaysia
- Mallinella simoni Dankittipakul, Jocqué & Singtripop, 2010 – Java, Belitung
- Mallinella slaburuprica (Barrion & Litsinger, 1995) – Philippines
- Mallinella sobria (Thorell, 1890) – Sumatra
- Mallinella sphaerica Jin & Zhang, 2013 – China
- Mallinella spiralis Dankittipakul, Jocqué & Singtripop, 2012 – Thailand
- Mallinella stenotheca Dankittipakul, Jocqué & Singtripop, 2012 – Thailand
- Mallinella suavis (Thorell, 1895) – Myanmar
- Mallinella subinermis Caporiacco, 1947 – Tanzania
- Mallinella submonticola (van Hove & Bosmans, 1984) – Cameroon, Príncipe
- Mallinella sumatrana Dankittipakul, Jocqué & Singtripop, 2012 – Sumatra
- Mallinella sundaica Dankittipakul, Jocqué & Singtripop, 2012 – Malaysia
- Mallinella superba Dankittipakul, Jocqué & Singtripop, 2012 – Borneo
- Mallinella sylvatica (van Hove & Bosmans, 1984) – Cameroon
- Mallinella thailandica Dankittipakul, Jocqué & Singtripop, 2012 – Thailand
- Mallinella thinhi Ono, 2003 – Vietnam
- Mallinella tianlin Zhang, Zhang & Jia, 2012 – China
- Mallinella tricuspidata Dankittipakul, Jocqué & Singtripop, 2012 – Malaysia
- Mallinella tridentata (Bosmans & van Hove, 1986) – Cameroon
- Mallinella triplex Nzigidahera, Desnyder & Jocqué, 2011 – Burundi
- Mallinella tuberculata Dankittipakul, Jocqué & Singtripop, 2012 – Thailand
- Mallinella tumidifemoris Ono & Hashim, 2008 – Malaysia
- Mallinella uncinata (Ono, 1983) – Nepal
- Mallinella v-insignita (Bosmans & Hillyard, 1990) – Sulawesi
- Mallinella vandermarlierei (Bosmans & van Hove, 1986) – Cameroon
- Mallinella vicaria (Kulczyński, 1911) – Java
- Mallinella vietnamensis Ono, 2003 – Vietnam
- Mallinella vittata (Thorell, 1890) – Sumatra
- Mallinella vittiventris Strand, 1913 – Congo, Rwanda
- Mallinella vokrensis (Bosmans & van Hove, 1986) – Cameroon
- Mallinella vulparia Dankittipakul, Jocqué & Singtripop, 2012 – New Guinea
- Mallinella vulpina Dankittipakul, Jocqué & Singtripop, 2012 – New Guinea
- Mallinella wiputrai Dankittipakul, Jocqué & Singtripop, 2010 – Belitung
- Mallinella zebra (Thorell, 1881) – Aru Is., New Guinea, Solomon Is., Queensland
- Mallinella zhui Zhang, Zhang & Jia, 2012 – China
