= Tropasteron =

Scientific classification
- Domain: Eukaryota
- Kingdom: Animalia
- Phylum: Arthropoda
- Subphylum: Chelicerata
- Class: Arachnida
- Order: Araneae
- Infraorder: Araneomorphae
- Family: Zodariidae
- Genus: Tropasteron; Baehr

Type species
- Tropasteron cleveland

Species
- 22, see text

Genus of spiders

Tropasteron is a genus of spiders in the family Zodariidae. It was first described in 2003 by Baehr. As of 2017, it contains 22 species, all found in Queensland.

== Species ==
Tropasteron comprises the following species:

- Tropasteron andreae Baehr, 2003
- Tropasteron cardwell Baehr, 2003
- Tropasteron cleveland Baehr, 2003
- Tropasteron cooki Baehr, 2003
- Tropasteron daviesae Baehr, 2003
- Tropasteron eacham Baehr, 2003
- Tropasteron fox Baehr, 2003
- Tropasteron halifax Baehr, 2003
- Tropasteron heatherae Baehr, 2003
- Tropasteron julatten Baehr, 2003
- Tropasteron luteipes Baehr, 2003
- Tropasteron magnum Baehr, 2003
- Tropasteron malbon Baehr, 2003
- Tropasteron monteithi Baehr, 2003
- Tropasteron palmerston Baehr, 2003
- Tropasteron pseudomagnum Baehr, 2003
- Tropasteron raveni Baehr, 2003
- Tropasteron robertsi Baehr, 2003
- Tropasteron splendens Baehr, 2003
- Tropasteron thompsoni Baehr, 2003
- Tropasteron tribulation Baehr, 2003
- Tropasteron yeatesi Baehr, 2003
