= Murphydrela =

Scientific classification
- Kingdom: Animalia
- Phylum: Arthropoda
- Subphylum: Chelicerata
- Class: Arachnida
- Order: Araneae
- Infraorder: Araneomorphae
- Family: Zodariidae
- Genus: Murphydrela; Jocqué & Russell-Smith, 2022

Type species
- M. johannis Jocqué & Russell-Smith, 2022

Species
- 5, see text

Genus of spiders

Murphydrela is a genus of spiders in the family Zodariidae.

== Distribution ==
Murphydrela occurs in East and Central Africa.

== Etymology ==
The genus, as well the species M. francescae and M. johannis, are named in honor of arachnologists John and Frances Murphy. M. michaelis honors arachnologist Michael Roberts (1945–2020).

== Species ==
As of January 2026, this genus includes five species:

- Murphydrela francescae Jocqué & Russell-Smith, 2022 – DR Congo
- Murphydrela johannis Jocqué & Russell-Smith, 2022 – DR Congo, Rwanda, Burundi, Malawi
- Murphydrela kreagra (Nzigidahera & Jocqué, 2010) – Burundi
- Murphydrela michaelis Jocqué & Russell-Smith, 2022 – Kenya
- Murphydrela neptuna (Nzigidahera & Jocqué, 2010) – Burundi
