= B. K. Tikader =

India arachnologist (spider expert) and zoologist

Benoy Krishna Tikader
- Born: 1928; Jaidihi, Khulna
- Died: 12 August 1994 (aged 65–66); Calcutta, India
- Occupation: Zoologist

Benoy Krishna Tikader (1928–1994) was an Indian arachnologist and zoologist and a leading expert on Indian spiders in his time. He worked in the Zoological Survey of India and published the Handbook of Indian Spiders in 1987. The book describes 40 families and 1066 species of India, many of which were described by Tikader himself. The handbook is a guide to all arachnids including scorpions, and not just spiders. He was also a popular scientific author in his native language of Bengali, and was the author of Banglar Makorsha (literally: "Bengal's spiders") for the layman.

== Focus on eastern India ==
Working in the Zoological Survey of India based in Kolkata, Tikader was especially interested in the spiders of eastern India and the Andaman and Nicobar Islands. Many new species names chosen by him thus bear names of places in eastern India or the Andaman and Nicobar Islands. For e.g., andamanensis (from the Andaman Islands), bengalensis (from Bengal), and dhakuriensis (from Dhakuria, in Kolkata).

== Honours ==
He held PhD and DSc degrees from Calcutta University. A number of species were named after him by his colleagues:

Fish:

1. Nemacheilus tikaderi (originally Aborichthys tikaderi ) of the family Balitoridae (Barman, 1985)

Spiders:

1. Nodocion tikaderi of the family Gnaphosidae (Gajbe, 1992)
2. Eilica tikaderi of the family Gnaphosidae (Platnick, 1976)
3. Drassodes tikaderi (Gajbe, 1987)
4. Poecilochroa tikaderi of the family Gnaphosidae (Patel, 1989)
5. Petrotricha tikaderi of the family Gnaphosidae (Gajbe, 1983)
6. Scopoides tikaderi of the family Gnaphosidae (Gajbe, 1987)
7. Mimetus tikaderi of the family Mimetidae (Gajbe, 1992)
8. Marpissa tikaderi (Biswas, 1984)
9. Chorizopes tikaderi of the family Araneidae (Sadana & Kaur, 1974)
10. Olios tikaderi of the family Sparassidae (Kundu, Biswas & Raychaudhuri, 1999)
11. Clubiona tikaderi of the family Clubionidae (Majumder & Tikader, 1991)
12. Pardosa tikaderi of the family Lycosidae (Arora & Monga, 1994)
13. Oxyopes tikaderi of the family Oxyopidae (Biswas & Majumder, 1995)
14. Theridion tikaderi (Patel, 1973)
15. Pistius tikaderi (Kumari & Mittal, 1999)
16. Xysticus tikaderi (Bhandari & Gajbe, 2001)
17. Storena tikaderi of the family Zodariidae (Patel & Reddy, 1989)

== Important publications ==
- Tikader B K (1982), Fauna of India: Arachnid Vol 2: Spiders, Zoological Survey of India
- Tikader B K (1983), Threatened Animals of India, Zoological Survey of India, Calcutta
- Tikader B K and Bastwade D (1983), Fauna of India: Arachnid Vol 3: Scorpions, Zoological Survey of India, Calcutta, India.
- Tikader B K (1987) Handbook of Indian Spiders, Zoological Survey of India, Calcutta, India.
- Tikader B K and RC Sharma (December 1985), Handbook of Indian Testudines, Zoological Survey of India, Calcutta, India
- Tikader B K and Ramakrishna (December 1988), Role of Spinning Apparatus in Non-Orb-Weaving and Orb-Weaving Spiders from India, Zoological Survey of India, Calcutta, India.
- Tikader B K and Animesh Bal (January 1981), Studies on Some Orb-Weaving Spiders of the Genera Neoscona Simon and Araneus Clerck of the Family Araneidae from India, Zoological Survey of India, Calcutta, India

== Personal life ==
He was married to Mridula Tikader. They have a daughter and two sons.
