= Trygetus =

Scientific classification
- Kingdom: Animalia
- Phylum: Arthropoda
- Subphylum: Chelicerata
- Class: Arachnida
- Order: Araneae
- Infraorder: Araneomorphae
- Family: Zodariidae
- Genus: Trygetus; Simon

Type species
- Trygetus sexoculatus

Species
- 7, see text

Genus of spiders

Trygetus is a genus of spiders in the family Zodariidae. It was first described in 1882 by Simon. As of 2017, it contains 7 species.

== Species ==
Trygetus comprises the following species:

- Trygetus berlandi Denis, 1952
- Trygetus gromovi Marusik, 2011
- Trygetus jacksoni Marusik & Guseinov, 2003
- Trygetus nitidissimus Simon, 1882
- Trygetus rectus Jocqué, 2011
- Trygetus riyadhensis Ono & Jocqué, 1986
- Trygetus sexoculatus (O. Pickard-Cambridge, 1872)
