= Pax (spider) =

Scientific classification
- Kingdom: Animalia
- Phylum: Arthropoda
- Subphylum: Chelicerata
- Class: Arachnida
- Order: Araneae
- Infraorder: Araneomorphae
- Family: Zodariidae
- Genus: Pax; Levy, 1990

Type species
- Pax libani (Simon, 1873)

Synonyms
- Storamia

Genus of spiders

Pax is a genus of Asian ant spiders first described by Gershom Levy in 1990.

== Species ==
As of October 2025, this genus includes eight species:

- Pax akilae Shafaie & Pekár, 2025 – Syria
- Pax ellipita Zamani & Marusik, 2021 – Iran
- Pax engediensis Levy, 1990 – Israel
- Pax islamita (Simon, 1873) – Turkey, Israel, Syria, Lebanon
- Pax leila Zamani & Marusik, 2021 – Iran
- Pax libani (Simon, 1873) – Israel, Lebanon (type species)
- Pax meadei (O. Pickard-Cambridge, 1872) – Israel, Jordan
- Pax palmonii Levy, 1990 – Israel
