= Heradion =

Scientific classification
- Kingdom: Animalia
- Phylum: Arthropoda
- Subphylum: Chelicerata
- Class: Arachnida
- Order: Araneae
- Infraorder: Araneomorphae
- Family: Zodariidae
- Genus: Heradion; Jocqué

Type species
- Heradion naiadis

Species
- 10, see text

Genus of spiders

Heradion is a genus of spiders in the family Zodariidae. It was first described in 2004 by Dankittipakul & Jocqué. As of 2017, it contains 10 species found throughout Asia.

== Species ==
Heradion comprises the following species:

- Heradion damrongi Dankittipakul & Jocqué, 2004
- Heradion depressum Dankittipakul, Jäger & Singtripop, 2012
- Heradion flammeum (Ono, 2004)
- Heradion intermedium Chami-Kranon & Ono, 2007
- Heradion luctator Dankittipakul & Jocqué, 2004
- Heradion momoinum (Ono, 2004)
- Heradion naiadis Dankittipakul & Jocqué, 2004
- Heradion paradiseum (Ono, 2004)
- Heradion pernix Dankittipakul & Jocqué, 2004
- Heradion peteri Dankittipakul & Jocqué, 2004
