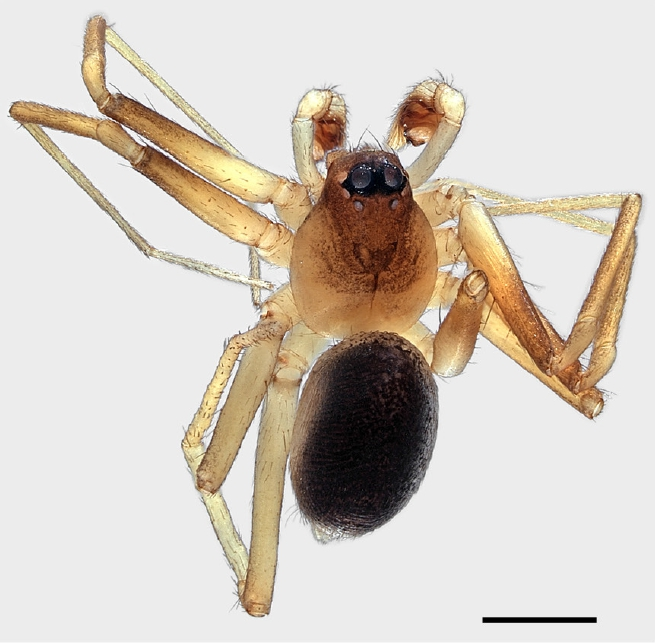
- Acanthinozodium crateriferum Holotype male, dorsal view. Scale bar = 1 mm

Scientific classification
- Kingdom: Animalia
- Phylum: Arthropoda
- Subphylum: Chelicerata
- Class: Arachnida
- Order: Araneae
- Infraorder: Araneomorphae
- Family: Zodariidae
- Genus: Acanthinozodium; Denis, 1966

Type species
- Acanthinozodium spinulosum Denis, 1966

Species
- 23, see text

= Acanthinozodium =

Genus of spiders

Acanthinozodium is a genus of spiders in the family Zodariidae. It was described in 1966 by Jacques Denis.

== Species ==
As of September 2022 it contains twenty-three species and one subspecies:

- Acanthinozodium ansieae Jocqué & van Harten, 2015 – Yemen (Socotra)
- Acanthinozodium armita Zamani & Marusik, 2021 – Iran
- Acanthinozodium atrisa Zamani & Marusik, 2021 – Iran
- Acanthinozodium cirrisulcatum Denis, 1952 – Mauritania, Morocco
  - Acanthinozodium cirrisulcatum longispina Denis, 1952 – Morocco
- Acanthinozodium crateriferum Jocqué & Henrard, 2015 – Ethiopia
- Acanthinozodium diara Zamani & Marusik, 2021 – Iran
- Acanthinozodium dorsa Zamani & Marusik, 2021 – Iran
- Acanthinozodium elburzicum Zamani & Marusik, 2021 – Iran
- Acanthinozodium kiana Zamani & Marusik, 2021 – Iran
- Acanthinozodium masa Zamani & Marusik, 2021 – Iran
- Acanthinozodium niusha Zamani & Marusik, 2021 – Iran
- Acanthinozodium ovtchinnikovi Zamani & Marusik, 2021 – Turkmenistan
- Acanthinozodium parmida Zamani & Marusik, 2021 – Iran
- Acanthinozodium parysatis Zamani & Marusik, 2021 – Iran
- Acanthinozodium quercicola Jocqué & Henrard, 2015 – Morocco
- Acanthinozodium sahariense Denis, 1959 – Algeria
- Acanthinozodium sahelense Jocqué & Henrard, 2015 – Senegal, Ivory Coast, Burkina Faso, Cameroon
- Acanthinozodium sericeum Denis, 1956 – Morocco
- Acanthinozodium sorani Zamani & Marusik, 2021 – Iran
- Acanthinozodium spinulosum Denis, 1966 (type) – Libya
- Acanthinozodium subclavatum Denis, 1952 – Morocco
- Acanthinozodium tibesti Jocqué, 1991 – Chad
- Acanthinozodium zavattarii (Caporiacco, 1941) – Ethiopia
