= Suffascar =

Scientific classification
- Kingdom: Animalia
- Phylum: Arthropoda
- Subphylum: Chelicerata
- Class: Arachnida
- Order: Araneae
- Infraorder: Araneomorphae
- Family: Zodariidae
- Genus: Suffascar; Henrard & Jocqué, 2017

Type species
- S. fianara Henrard & Jocqué, 2017

Species
- 12, see text

Genus of spiders

Suffascar is a genus of Malagasy ant spiders first described by A. Henrard & Rudy Jocqué in 2017.

== Species ==
As of April 2019 it contains twelve species:

- Suffascar albolineatus Henrard & Jocqué, 2017 — Madagascar
- Suffascar fianara Henrard & Jocqué, 2017 — Madagascar
- Suffascar fisheri Henrard & Jocqué, 2017 — Madagascar
- Suffascar fitzpatrickae Henrard & Jocqué, 2017 — Madagascar
- Suffascar gigas Henrard & Jocqué, 2017 — Madagascar
- Suffascar griswoldi Henrard & Jocqué, 2017 — Madagascar
- Suffascar macromma Henrard & Jocqué, 2017 — Madagascar
- Suffascar micromma Henrard & Jocqué, 2017 — Madagascar
- Suffascar nonus Henrard & Jocqué, 2017 — Madagascar
- Suffascar scutatus Henrard & Jocqué, 2017 — Madagascar
- Suffascar sufficiens Henrard & Jocqué, 2017 — Madagascar
- Suffascar tofti Henrard & Jocqué, 2017 — Madagascar
