= Omucukia =

Scientific classification
- Domain: Eukaryota
- Kingdom: Animalia
- Phylum: Arthropoda
- Subphylum: Chelicerata
- Class: Arachnida
- Order: Araneae
- Infraorder: Araneomorphae
- Family: Zodariidae
- Genus: Omucukia; Kemal

Type species
- Omucukia madrela

Species
- Omucukia angusta (Simon, 1889); Omucukia madrela (Jocqué, 1991)

Genus of spiders

Omucukia is a genus of spiders in the family Zodariidae. It was first described in 2008 by Koçak & Kemal. As of 2017, it contains 2 species from Madagascar.
