= Nodocion voluntarius =

Scientific classification
- Kingdom: Animalia
- Phylum: Arthropoda
- Subphylum: Chelicerata
- Class: Arachnida
- Order: Araneae
- Infraorder: Araneomorphae
- Family: Gnaphosidae
- Genus: Nodocion
- Species: N. voluntarius

Binomial name
- Nodocion voluntarius (Chamberlin, 1919)

Synonyms
- Liodrassus carrvillus Chamberlin & Ivie, 1941; Liodrassus florissantus Chamberlin, 1936; Scotophaeus voluntarius Chamberlin, 1919

Species of spider

Nodocion voluntarius is a species of ground spider in the family Gnaphosidae. It is found in North America.
