= Workmania =

Scientific classification
- Domain: Eukaryota
- Kingdom: Animalia
- Phylum: Arthropoda
- Subphylum: Chelicerata
- Class: Arachnida
- Order: Araneae
- Infraorder: Araneomorphae
- Family: Zodariidae
- Genus: Workmania; Singtripop

Type species
- Workmania botuliformis

Species
- Workmania botuliformis Dankittipakul, Jocqué & Singtripop, 2012; Workmania juvenca (Workman, 1896)

Genus of spiders

Workmania is a genus of spiders in the family Zodariidae. It was first described in 2012 by Dankittipakul, Jocqué & Singtripop. As of 2017, it contains 2 Asian species.
