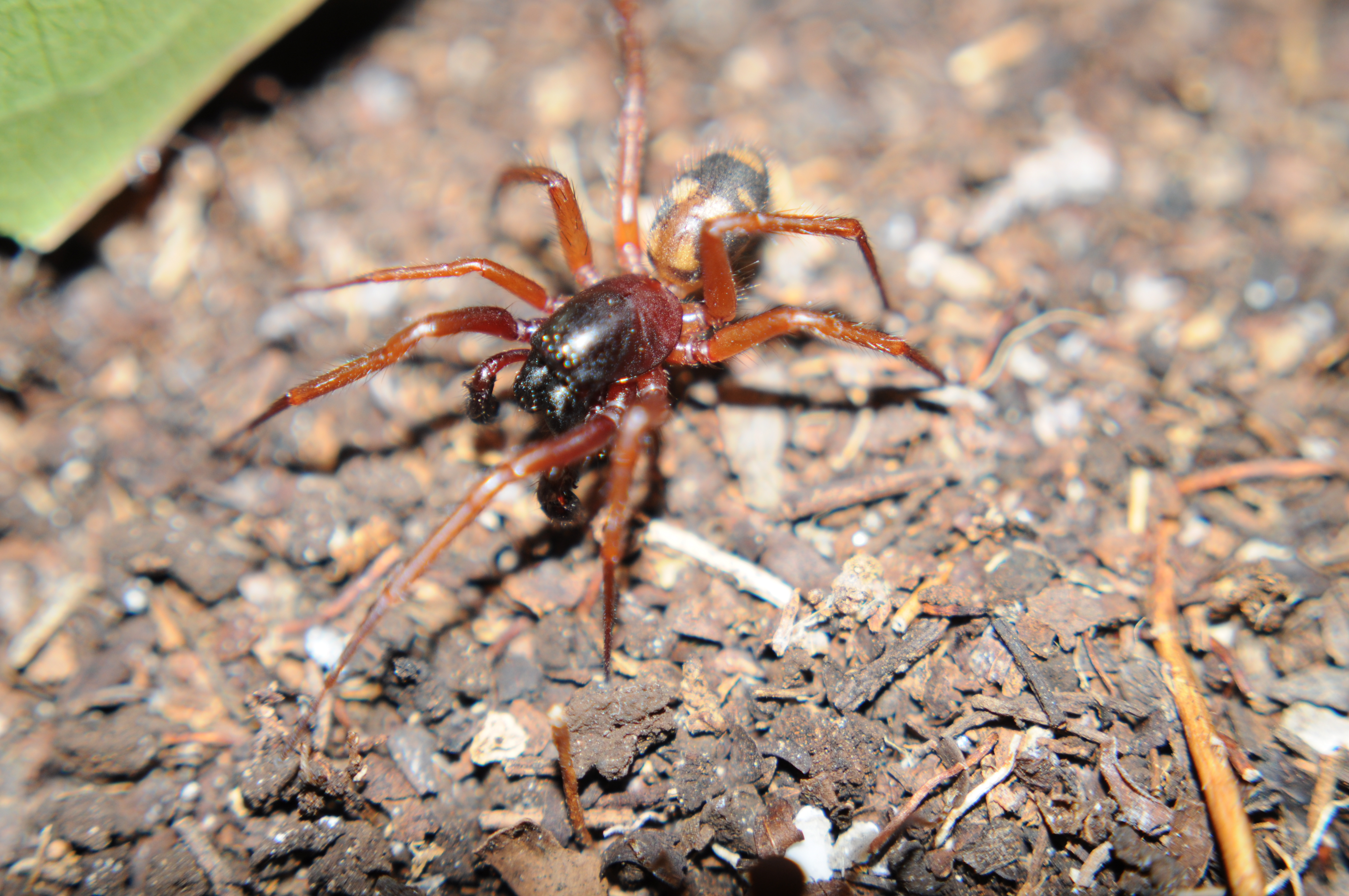

Scientific classification
- Kingdom: Animalia
- Phylum: Arthropoda
- Subphylum: Chelicerata
- Class: Arachnida
- Order: Araneae
- Infraorder: Araneomorphae
- Family: Zodariidae
- Genus: Ishania; Chamberlin

Type species
- Ishania tentativa

Species
- 35, see text

= Ishania =

Genus of spiders

Ishania is a genus of Central American ant spiders first described in 1925 by Ralph Vary Chamberlin. Originally placed in Agelenidae, it was later moved to Zodariidae in 1965.

== Species ==
As of February 2019, it contains the following species:

- Ishania absoluta (Gertsch & Davis, 1940) — Mexico
- Ishania aztek Jocqué & Baert, 2002 — Mexico
- Ishania centrocavata Jocqué & Baert, 2002 — Mexico
- Ishania chicanna Jocqué & Baert, 2002 — Mexico
- Ishania chichimek Jocqué & Baert, 2002 — Mexico
- Ishania firma Jocqué & Baert, 2002 — Mexico
- Ishania gertschi Jocqué & Baert, 2002 — Mexico
- Ishania guerrero Jocqué & Baert, 2002 — Mexico
- Ishania hessei (Chamberlin & Ivie, 1936) — Mexico
- Ishania huastek Jocqué & Baert, 2002 — Mexico
- Ishania ivieorum Jocqué & Baert, 2002 — Mexico
- Ishania latefossulata Jocqué & Baert, 2002 — Mexico
- Ishania maya Jocqué & Baert, 2002 — Mexico
- Ishania minuta Jocqué & Baert, 2002 — Honduras
- Ishania mixtek Jocqué & Baert, 2002 — Mexico
- Ishania mundella (Gertsch & Davis, 1940) — Mexico
- Ishania nayarit Jocqué & Baert, 2002 — Mexico
- Ishania oaxaca Jocqué & Baert, 2002 — Mexico
- Ishania ocosingo Jocqué & Baert, 2002 — Mexico
- Ishania olmek Jocqué & Baert, 2002 — Mexico
- Ishania paxoides Jocqué & Baert, 2002 — Mexico, Honduras
- Ishania perforata Jocqué & Baert, 2002 — Guatemala
- Ishania protecta Jocqué & Baert, 2002 — Mexico
- Ishania querci Jocqué & Baert, 2002 — Mexico
- Ishania real Jocqué & Baert, 2002 — Mexico
- Ishania relativa Jocqué & Baert, 2002 — Mexico
- Ishania simplex Jocqué & Baert, 2002 — Mexico
- Ishania tarask Jocqué & Baert, 2002 — Mexico
- Ishania tentativa Chamberlin, 1925 — Costa Rica
- Ishania tinga (F. O. Pickard-Cambridge, 1899) — Mexico
- Ishania tormento Jocqué & Baert, 2002 — Mexico
- Ishania totonak Jocqué & Baert, 2002 — Mexico
- Ishania vacua Jocqué & Baert, 2002 — Mexico
- Ishania xilitla Jocqué & Baert, 2002 — Mexico
- Ishania zapotek Jocqué & Baert, 2002 — Mexico
