= Storena =

Scientific classification
- Domain: Eukaryota
- Kingdom: Animalia
- Phylum: Arthropoda
- Subphylum: Chelicerata
- Class: Arachnida
- Order: Araneae
- Infraorder: Araneomorphae
- Family: Zodariidae
- Genus: Storena; Walckenaer, 1805

Type species
- Storena cyanea Walckenaer, 1805

Species
- 55, see text

Genus of spiders

Storena is a genus of ant spiders first described by Charles Athanase Walckenaer in 1805.

== Description ==
Members of this genus are medium to large spiders with exoskeletons that may be smooth or granulated in texture, lightly covered with hairs. The colour of the carapace ranges from reddish orange to dark chestnut-brown or black, usually darker around the eyes. The legs are orange to red, sometimes darkening towards the tarsi. The abdomen exhibits 2, 3, or 5 yellow or orange spots on the upper surface, with the unpaired spot (when present) positioned above the spinnerets and a brown pitted shield sitting between the spots. The eyes are circular and split across three rows, with two eyes in the bottom row, four in the middle, and two in the top row.

== Species ==
As of August 2020 it contains 55 species:

- S. analis Simon, 1893 — Ecuador
- S. annulipes (L. Koch, 1867) — Australia (Queensland)
- S. aspinosa Jocqué & Baehr, 1992 — Australia (South Australia)
- S. botenella Jocqué & Baehr, 1992 — Australia (South Australia)
- S. braccata (L. Koch, 1865) — Australia (New South Wales)
- S. canalensis Berland, 1924 — New Caledonia
- S. caporiaccoi Brignoli, 1983 — Venezuela
- S. charlotte Jocqué & Baehr, 1992 — Australia (Queensland, Victoria)
- S. cochleare Jocqué & Baehr, 1992 — Australia (New South Wales)
- S. colossea Rainbow, 1920 — Australia (Lord Howe Is.)
- S. cyanea Walckenaer, 1805 — Eastern Australia
- S. daviesae Jocqué & Baehr, 1992 — Australia (Queensland)
- S. deserticola Jocqué, 1991 — Australia (Northern Territory)
- S. digitulus Jocqué & Baehr, 1992 — Australia (Queensland)
- S. eximia Simon, 1908 — Australia (Western Australia)
- S. flavipes (Urquhart, 1893) — Australia (Tasmania)
- S. flavopicta (Simon, 1876) — Indonesia (Moluccas)
- S. flexuosa (Thorell, 1895) — Myanmar
- S. formosa Thorell, 1870 — Australia (mainland, Lord Howe Is.)
- S. fungina Jocqué & Baehr, 1992 — Australia (Western Australia)
- S. graeffei (L. Koch, 1866) — Australia (New South Wales)
- S. harveyi Jocqué & Baehr, 1995 — Australia (Western Australia)
- S. ignava Jocqué & Baehr, 1992 — Australia (Northern Territory)
- S. inornata Rainbow, 1916 — Australia (Queensland)
- S. kraepelini Simon, 1905 — Indonesia (Java)
- S. lebruni Simon, 1886 — Argentina
- S. lesserti Berland, 1938 — Vanuatu
- S. longiducta Jocqué & Baehr, 1992 — Australia (Queensland)
- S. maculata O. Pickard-Cambridge, 1869 — Australia (Queensland)
- S. mainae Jocqué & Baehr, 1995 — Australia (New South Wales, Victoria)
- S. martini Jocqué & Baehr, 1992 — Australia (Northern Territory)
- S. mathematica Jocqué & Baehr, 1992 — Australia (Northern Territory)
- S. metallica Jocqué & Baehr, 1992 — Australia (Queensland)
- S. nana Jocqué & Baehr, 1992 — Australia (Victoria)
- S. nuga Jocqué & Baehr, 1992 — Australia (Queensland)
- S. ornata (Bradley, 1877) — Australia (Queensland)
- S. parvicavum Jocqué & Baehr, 1992 — Australia (Queensland)
- S. parvula Berland, 1938 — Vanuatu
- S. paucipunctata Jocqué & Baehr, 1992 — Australia (Western Australia)
- S. procedens Jocqué & Baehr, 1992 — Australia (Queensland)
- S. rainbowi Berland, 1924 — New Caledonia
- S. rastellata Strand, 1913 — Central Australia
- S. raveni Jocqué & Baehr, 1992 — Australia (Queensland)
- S. recta Jocqué & Baehr, 1992 — Australia (Western Australia, Queensland, New South Wales)
- S. recurvata Jocqué & Baehr, 1992 — Australia (Queensland, New South Wales, Victoria)
- S. rotunda Jocqué & Baehr, 1992 — Australia (New South Wales)
- S. rufescens Thorell, 1881 — New Guinea, Australia (Queensland)
- S. rugosa Simon, 1889 — New Caledonia
- S. scita Jocqué & Baehr, 1992 — Australia (Queensland)
- S. silvicola Berland, 1924 — New Caledonia
- S. sinuosa Jocqué & Baehr, 1992 — Australia (Western Australia)
- S. tenera (Thorell, 1895) — Myanmar
- S. tricolor Simon, 1908 — Australia (Western Australia)
- S. variegata O. Pickard-Cambridge, 1869 — Australia (Western Australia, South Australia)
- S. zavattarii Caporiacco, 1941 — Ethiopia
