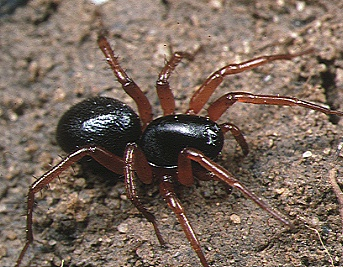
- Female Mallinella fulvipes
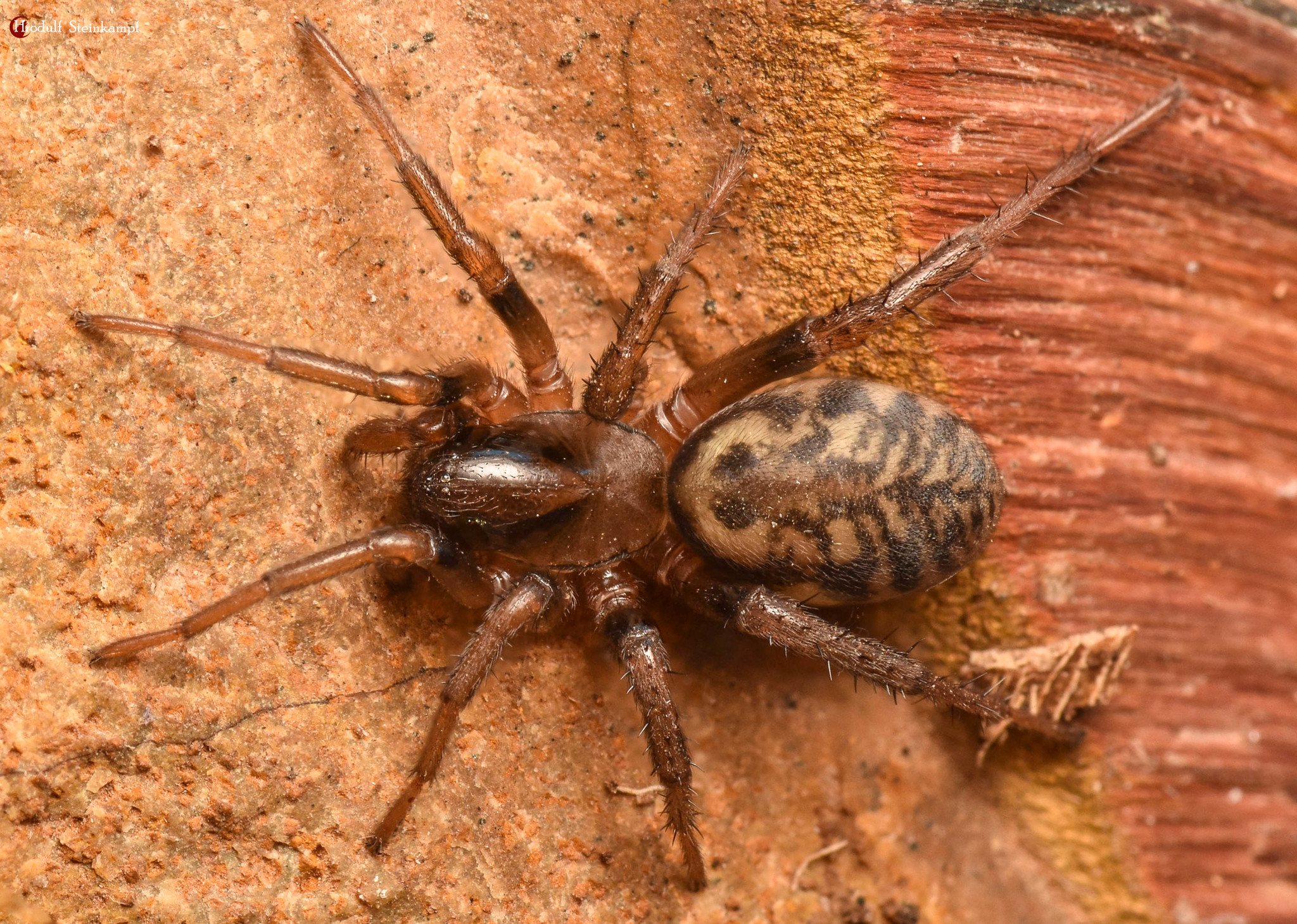
- Caesetius sp.

Scientific classification
- Kingdom: Animalia
- Phylum: Arthropoda
- Subphylum: Chelicerata
- Class: Arachnida
- Order: Araneae
- Suborder: Opisthothelae
- Infraorder: Araneomorphae
- Family: Zodariidae; Thorell, 1881

Diversity
- 90 genera, 1,325 species
- blue: reported countries (WSC) green: observation hotspots (iNaturalist)

= Ant spider =

Ant spiders Temporal range: Palaeogene–present

Family of spiders

Ant spiders are members of the family Zodariidae. They are small to medium-sized eight-eyed spiders found in all tropical and subtropical regions of South America, Africa, Madagascar, Australia-New Guinea, New Zealand, Arabia, and the Indian subcontinent.

Most species are daytime hunters and live together with ants, mimicking their behavior and sometimes even their chemical traits. Although little is known about most zodariids, members of the genus Zodarion apparently feed only on ants; a number of other genera in the family are apparently also ant (or termite) specialists.

== Genera ==
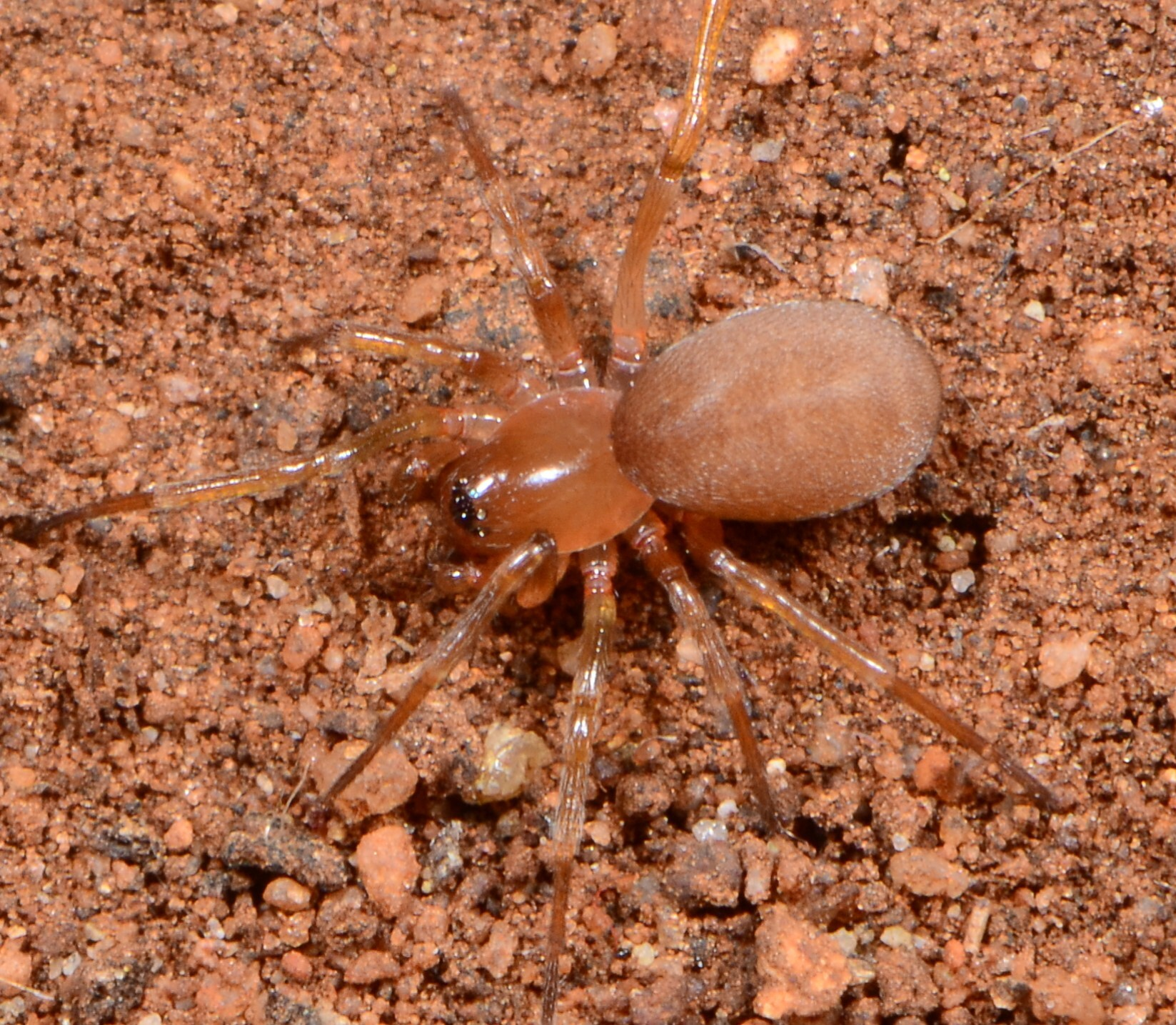
male Diores russelli

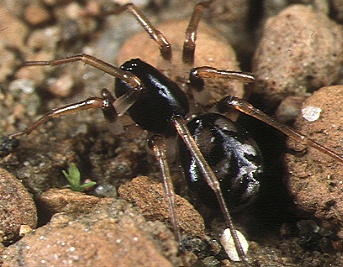
female Mallinella shimojanai

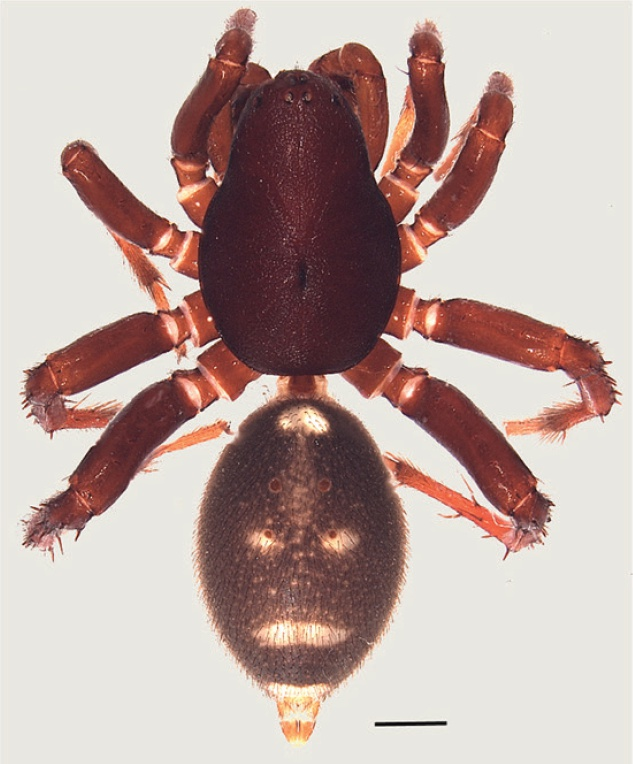
male Palindroma morogorom

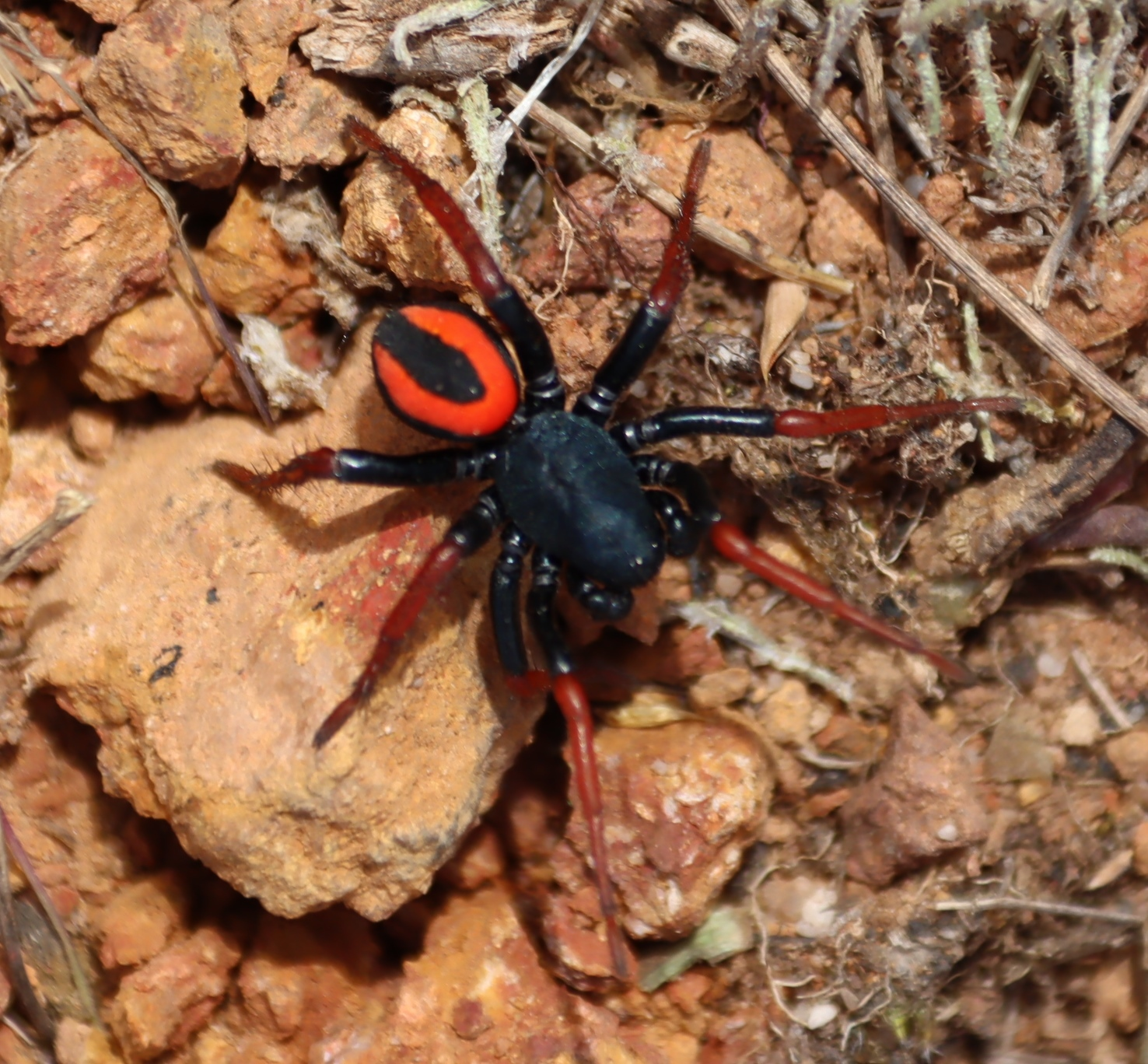
Psammorygma aculeatum

As of January 2026, this family includes ninety genera and 1,325 species:

- Acanthinozodium Denis, 1966 – Africa, Asia
- Akyttara Jocqué, 1987 – Africa, Vietnam
- Amphiledorus Jocqué & Bosmans, 2001 – Algeria, Morocco, Tunisia, Portugal, Spain
- Antillorena Jocqué, 1991 – Caribbean, Brazil, Colombia
- Asceua Thorell, 1887 – Africa, Asia, Australia
- Aschema Jocqué, 1991 – Madagascar
- Asteron Jocqué, 1991 – Australia
- Australutica Jocqué, 1995 – South Africa, Australia
- Ballomma Jocqué & Henrard, 2015 – South Africa
- Basasteron Baehr, 2003 – Australia
- Caesetius Simon, 1893 – Southern Africa
- Cambonilla Jocqué, 2019 – Cambodia, Laos
- Capheris Simon, 1893 – Africa, India
- Cavasteron Baehr & Jocqué, 2000 – Australia
- Chariobas Simon, 1893 – Africa
- Chilumena Jocqué, 1995 – Australia
- Cicynethus Simon, 1910 – Southern Africa
- Colimarena Jocqué & Baert, 2021 – Mexico
- Cryptothele L. Koch, 1872 – Indonesia, Singapore, India, Sri Lanka, Oceania
- Cybaeodamus Mello-Leitão, 1938 – South America
- Cydrela Thorell, 1873 – Africa, China, Thailand, Vietnam, Yemen
- Cyrioctea Simon, 1889 – Namibia, South Africa, Australia, Argentina, Chile
- Diores Simon, 1893 – Africa
- Dusmadiores Jocqué, 1987 – Tanzania, Uganda, Western Africa, Yemen
- Epicratinus Jocqué & Baert, 2005 – Bolivia, Brazil, Guyana
- Euasteron Baehr, 2003 – Australia
- Euryeidon Dankittipakul & Jocqué, 2004 – China, Thailand
- Forsterella Jocqué, 1991 – New Zealand
- Habronestes L. Koch, 1872 – Australia
- Heliconilla Dankittipakul, Jocqué & Singtripop, 2012 – China, Southeast Asia
- Heradida Simon, 1893 – Ethiopia, Tanzania, Namibia, South Africa
- Heradion Dankittipakul & Jocqué, 2004 – China, Southeast Asia
- Hermippus Simon, 1893 – Africa, India, Sri Lanka
- Hetaerica Rainbow, 1916 – Australia
- Holasteron Baehr, 2004 – Australia
- Indozodion Ovtchinnikov, 2006 – Afghanistan, Pakistan
- Ishania Chamberlin, 1925 – Costa Rica, Guatemala, Honduras, Mexico
- Lachesana Strand, 1932 – Egypt, Asia, Cyprus, Greece
- Laminion Sankaran, Caleb & Sebastian, 2020 – India
- Leprolochus Simon, 1893 – Trinidad, Panama, South America
- Leptasteron Baehr & Jocqué, 2001 – Australia
- Leviola Miller, 1970 – Angola
- Lutica Marx, 1891 – United States
- Malayozodarion Ono & Hashim, 2008 – Malaysia
- Mallinella Strand, 1906 – Africa, Asia, Australia, Papua New Guinea, Solomon Islands
- Mallinus Simon, 1893 – South Africa
- Masasteron Baehr, 2004 – Australia
- Mastidiores Jocqué, 1987 – Kenya
- Microdiores Jocqué, 1987 – Burundi, Malawi, Tanzania
- Minasteron Baehr & Jocqué, 2000 – Australia
- Murphydrela Jocqué & Russell-Smith, 2022 – Democratic Republic of the Congo, Eastern Africa
- Neostorena Rainbow, 1914 – Australia
- Nostera Jocqué, 1991 – Australia
- Nosterella Baehr & Jocqué, 2017 – Australia
- Notasteron Baehr, 2005 – Australia
- Omucukia Koçak & Kemal, 2008 – Madagascar
- Palaestina O. Pickard-Cambridge, 1872 – Egypt, Israel, Lebanon, Turkey, Cyprus, Greece
- Palfuria Simon, 1910 – Africa
- Palindroma Jocqué & Henrard, 2015 – DR Congo, Malawi, Tanzania
- Parazodarion Ovtchinnikov, Ahmad & Gurko, 2009 – Asia
- Pax Levy, 1990 – Western Asia
- Pentasteron Baehr & Jocqué, 2001 – Australia
- Phenasteron Baehr & Jocqué, 2001 – Australia
- Platnickia Jocqué, 1991 – Argentina, Chile
- Procydrela Jocqué, 1999 – South Africa
- Psammoduon Jocqué, 1991 – Namibia, South Africa
- Psammorygma Jocqué, 1991 – Namibia, South Africa
- Pseudasteron Jocqué & Baehr, 2001 – Australia
- Ranops Jocqué, 1991 – Tanzania, Southern Africa
- Rotundrela Jocqué, 1999 – South Africa
- Selamia Simon, 1873 – Algeria, Morocco, Tunisia, Italy, Western Mediterranean
- Spinasteron Baehr, 2003 – Australia
- Spinozodium Zamani & Marusik, 2022 – Tajikistan
- Storena Walckenaer, 1805 – Ethiopia, Indonesia, Myanmar, Australia, New Caledonia, New Guinea, Vanuatu, Argentina, Ecuador, Venezuela
- Storenomorpha Simon, 1884 – China, Southeast Asia, India
- Storosa Jocqué, 1991 – Australia
- Subasteron Baehr & Jocqué, 2001 – Australia
- Suffascar Henrard & Jocqué, 2017 – Madagascar
- Suffasia Jocqué, 1991 – India, Nepal, Sri Lanka
- Suffrica Henrard & Jocqué, 2015 – Kenya, Tanzania
- Systenoplacis Simon, 1907 – Africa
- Tenedos O. Pickard-Cambridge, 1897 – Central America, South America
- Thaumastochilus Simon, 1897 – South Africa
- Tropasteron Baehr, 2003 – Australia
- Tropizodium Jocqué & Churchill, 2005 – China, Thailand, India, Nepal, Hawaii, Australia, French Polynesia, Bali. Introduced to Réunion
- Trygetus Simon, 1882 – Djibouti, Egypt, Morocco, Asia
- Workmania Dankittipakul, Jocqué & Singtripop, 2012 – Southeast Asia
- Zillimata Jocqué, 1995 – Australia
- Zodariellum Andreeva & Tystshenko, 1968 – Asia, Russia, Tadjikistan
- Zodarion Walckenaer, 1826 – North Africa, Asia, Europe, United States

== See also ==
- Myrmarachne, a genus of ant-mimicking spiders in the family Salticidae
