= List of Zodariidae species =

This page lists all described species of the spider family Zodariidae as of December 2020:

== A ==
=== Acanthinozodium ===
Acanthinozodium Denis, 1966 - Zodariinae

- A. ansieae Jocqué & van Harten, 2015 — Yemen (Socotra)
- A. cirrisulcatum Denis, 1952 — Mauritania, Morocco
  - A. c. longispina Denis, 1952 — Morocco
- A. crateriferum Jocqué & Henrard, 2015 — Ethiopia
- A. quercicola Jocqué & Henrard, 2015 — Morocco
- A. sahariense Denis, 1959 — Algeria
- A. sahelense Jocqué & Henrard, 2015 — Senegal, Ivory Coast, Burkina Faso, Cameroon
- A. sericeum Denis, 1956 — Morocco
- A. spinulosum Denis, 1966 (type) — Libya
- A. subclavatum Denis, 1952 — Morocco
- A. tibesti Jocqué, 1991 — Chad
- A. zavattarii (Caporiacco, 1941) — Ethiopia

=== † Adjutor ===
Adjutor Petrunkevitch, 1942 - Incertae Sedis

- † A. deformis Petrunkevitch, 1958 — Palaeogene Baltic amber
- † A. mirabilis Petrunkevitch, 1942 (type) — Palaeogene Baltic amber

=== † Admissor ===
Admissor Petrunkevitch, 1942 - Incerta Sedis

- † A. aculeatus Petrunkevitch, 1942 (type) — Palaeogene Baltic amber

=== † Adorator ===
Adorator Petrunkevitch, 1942 - Zodariinae

- † A. hispidus C. L. Koch & Berendt, 1854 — Palaeogene Baltic/Rovno amber
- † A. samlandicus Petrunkevitch, 1942 (type) — Palaeogene Baltic amber

=== Akyttara ===
Akyttara Jocqué, 1987 - Zodariinae

- A. akagera Jocqué, 1987 (type) — Rwanda
- A. homunculus Jocqué, 1991 — Botswana
- A. mahnerti Jocqué, 1987 — Kenya
- A. odorocci Ono, 2004 — Vietnam
- A. ritchiei Jocqué, 1987 — Kenya

=== Amphiledorus ===
Amphiledorus Jocqué & Bosmans, 2001 - Storeninae

- A. adonis Jocqué & Bosmans, 2001 — Portugal, Spain
- A. balnearius Jocqué & Bosmans, 2001 (type) — Spain, Algeria
- A. histrionicus (Simon, 1884) — Algeria, Tunisia
- A. ungoliantae Pekár & Cardoso, 2005 — Portugal

=== † Angusdarion ===
Angusdarion Wunderlich, 2004 - Zodariinae

- † A. humilis Wunderlich, 2004 (type) — Palaeogene Baltic amber

=== † Anniculus ===
Anniculus Petrunkevitch, 1942 - Incertae Sedis

- † A. balticus Petrunkevitch, 1942 (type) — Palaeogene Baltic amber

=== Antillorena ===
Antillorena Jocqué, 1991 - Lachesaninae

- A. gaia Brescovit & Ruiz, 2011 — Brazil
- A. patapata Brescovit & Ruiz, 2011 — Brazil
- A. polli (Simon, 1887) (type) — Lesser Antilles, Bahamas
- A. sanjacintensis Quijano-Cuervo & Brescovit, 2018 — Colombia

=== Asceua ===
Asceua

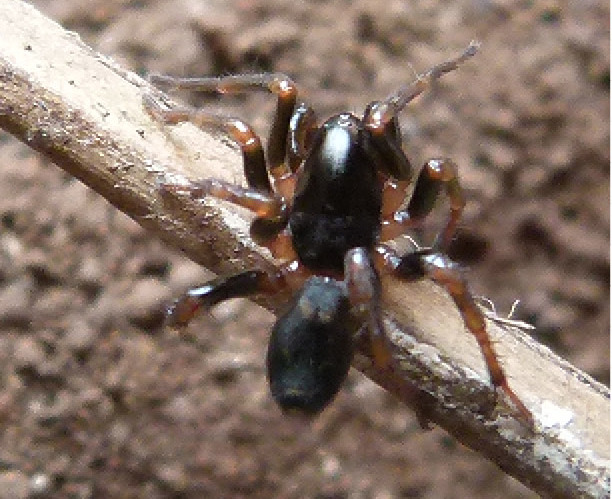
Asceua cingulata

Asceua Thorell, 1887 - Storeninae

As of September 2025, this genus includes 47 species:

- Asceua adunca B. S. Zhang & F. Zhang, 2018 – Laos
- Asceua amabilis Thorell, 1897 – Myanmar
- Asceua anding B. S. Zhang, F. Zhang & Jia, 2012 – China
- Asceua arborivaga Jocqué & Henrard, 2024 – Guinea
- Asceua banlaoensis H. B. Zhang & F. Zang, 2025 – China
- Asceua bifurca B. S. Zhang & F. Zhang, 2018 – Malaysia (Borneo)
- Asceua calciformis Li, Liu & Peng, 2022 – China
- Asceua chayu Wang, Mu, Lu, Xu & Zhang, 2024 – China
- Asceua cingulata (Simon, 1905) – India
- Asceua curva B. S. Zhang & F. Zhang, 2018 – Malaysia (Borneo)
- Asceua daoxian Yin, 2012 – China
- Asceua dawai Wang, Mu, Lu, Xu & Zhang, 2024 – China
- Asceua digitata Li, Liu & Peng, 2022 – China
- Asceua dispar (Kulczyński, 1911) – Indonesia (Java)
- Asceua elegans Thorell, 1887 – Myanmar (type species)
- Asceua expugnatrix Jocqué, 1995 – Australia (Northern Territory, Queensland)
- Asceua foordi Jocqué & Henrard, 2024 – Guinea, DR Congo, South Africa
- Asceua forcipiformis Li, Liu & Peng, 2022 – China
- Asceua gruezoi Barrion & Litsinger, 1992 – Philippines
- Asceua haocongi Lin & Li, 2023 – China (Hainan)
- Asceua heliophila (Simon, 1893) – Philippines
- Asceua incensa Jocqué & Henrard, 2024 – DR Congo
- Asceua japonica (Bösenberg & Strand, 1906) – Japan
- Asceua jianfeng Song & Kim, 1997 – China
- Asceua kunming Song & Kim, 1997 – China
- Asceua lejeunei Jocqué, 1991 – Guinea, Ivory Coast, Ghana, Nigeria, Ethiopia, DR Congo
- Asceua longji Barrion-Dupo, Barrion & Heong, 2013 – China (Hainan)
- Asceua luki Jocqué & Henrard, 2024 – DR Congo
- Asceua maculosa Logunov, 2010 – Vietnam
- Asceua menglun Song & Kim, 1997 – China
- Asceua nangunhe H. B. Zhang & F. Zang, 2025 – China
- Asceua palustris Jocqué & Henrard, 2024 – DR Congo
- Asceua piperata Ono, 2004 – Laos, Vietnam
- Asceua quadrimaculata B. S. Zhang, F. Zhang & Jia, 2012 – China
- Asceua quinquestrigata (Simon, 1905) – Indonesia (Java)
- Asceua radiosa Jocqué, 1986 – Comoros, Mayotte
- Asceua septemmaculata (Simon, 1893) – Vietnam
- Asceua shuangreni Lin & Li, 2023 – Vietnam
- Asceua similis Song & Kim, 1997 – China
- Asceua tertia Asima, Sankaran & Prasad, 2024 – India
- Asceua thrippalurensis Sankaran, 2023 – India
- Asceua torquata (Simon, 1909) – China, Laos, Vietnam
- Asceua trimaculata B. S. Zhang & F. Zhang, 2018 – Malaysia (peninsula)
- Asceua ventrofigurata Jocqué & Henrard, 2024 – Tanzania
- Asceua wallacei Bosmans & Hillyard, 1990 – Indonesia (Sulawesi)
- Asceua zijin Lin & Li, 2023 – China
- Asceua zodarionina (Simon, 1907) – Guinea-Bissau

=== Aschema ===
Aschema Jocqué, 1991 - Cydrelinae

- A. madagascariensis (Strand, 1907) — Madagascar
- A. pallida Jocqué, 1991 (type) — Madagascar

=== Asteron ===
Asteron Jocqué, 1991 - Storeninae

- A. biperforatum Jocqué & Baehr, 2001 — Australia (Queensland)
- A. grayi Jocqué & Baehr, 2001 — Australia (New South Wales)
- A. hunti Jocqué & Baehr, 2001 — Australia (New South Wales, Australian Capital Territory)
- A. inflatum Jocqué & Baehr, 2001 — Australia (Victoria)
- A. quintum Jocqué & Baehr, 2001 — Australia (Victoria)
- A. reticulatum Jocqué, 1991 (type) — Australia (Queensland, New South Wales. Victoria, Tasmania)
- A. tasmaniense Jocqué & Baehr, 2001 — Australia (Tasmania)
- A. zabkai Jocqué & Baehr, 2001 — Australia (New South Wales)

=== Australutica ===
Australutica

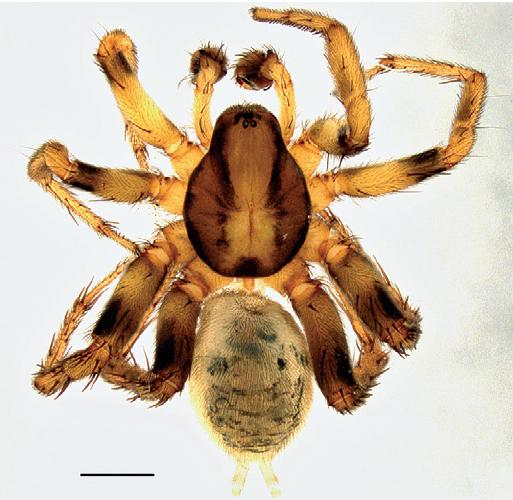
Australutica africana

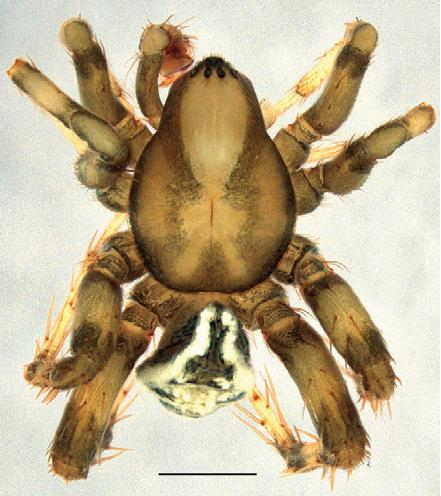
Australutica normanlarseni

Australutica Jocqué, 1995 - Lachesaninae

- A. africana Jocqué, 2008 — South Africa
- A. manifesta Jocqué, 1995 — Australia (South Australia)
- A. moreton Jocqué, 1995 (type) — Australia (Queensland)
- A. normanlarseni Jocqué, 2008 — South Africa
- A. quaerens Jocqué, 1995 — Australia (South Australia)
- A. xystarches Jocqué, 1995 — Australia (South Australia)

== B-C ==
=== Ballomma ===
Ballomma Jocqué & Henrard, 2015 - Incerta Sedis

- B. erasmus Jocqué & Henrard, 2015 (type) — South Africa
- B. haddadi Jocqué & Henrard, 2015 — South Africa
- B. legala Jocqué & Henrard, 2015 — South Africa
- B. neethlingi Jocqué & Henrard, 2015 — South Africa

=== Basasteron ===
Basasteron Baehr, 2003 - Storeninae

- B. leucosemum (Rainbow, 1920) (type) — Australia (Lord Howe Is.)

=== Caesetius ===
Caesetius Simon, 1893 - Cydrelinae

- C. bevisi (Hewitt, 1916) — South Africa
- C. biprocessiger (Lawrence, 1952) — South Africa
- C. flavoplagiatus Simon, 1910 — Namibia, South Africa
- C. globicoxis (Lawrence, 1942) — South Africa
- C. inflatus Jocqué, 1991 — Mozambique, Malawi, South Africa
- C. murinus Simon, 1893 (type) — South Africa
- C. politus Simon, 1893 — South Africa
- C. rosei (Bacelar, 1953) — Mozambique
- C. schultzei Simon, 1910 — South Africa
- C. spenceri (Pocock, 1900) — South Africa

=== Cambonilla ===
Cambonilla Jocqué, 2019 - Incertae Sedis

- C. securicula Jocqué, 2019 — Cambodia, Laos
- C. symphonia Jocqué & Henrard, 2019 — Cambodia

=== Capheris ===
Capheris Simon, 1893 - Cydrelinae

- C. abrupta Jocqué, 2009 — South Africa
- C. apophysalis Lawrence, 1928 — Namibia
- C. approximata (Karsch, 1878) — Namibia, South Africa
- C. brunnea (Marx, 1893) — Congo
- C. crassimana (Simon, 1887) (type) — Angola, Botswana, Namibia, South Africa
- C. decorata Simon, 1904 — Zambia, Zimbabwe, Mozambique, South Africa
- C. fitzsimonsi Lawrence, 1936 — Zimbabwe, Botswana
- C. kunenensis Lawrence, 1927 — Namibia
- C. langi Lawrence, 1936 — Botswana, South Africa
- C. oncka Lawrence, 1927 — Angola, Namibia, Botswana
- C. subtilis Jocqué, 2009 — Namibia, Zimbabwe, South Africa

=== Cavasteron ===
Cavasteron Baehr & Jocqué, 2000 - Storeninae

- C. agelenoides Baehr & Jocqué, 2000 — Australia (Queensland)
- C. atriceps Baehr & Jocqué, 2000 — Australia (South Australia)
- C. crassicalcar Baehr & Jocqué, 2000 — Australia (Western Australia, South Australia)
- C. exquisitum Baehr & Jocqué, 2000 — Australia (South Australia, Queensland)
- C. guttulatum Baehr & Jocqué, 2000 — Australia (South Australia)
- C. index Baehr & Jocqué, 2000 — Australia (Northern Territory)
- C. lacertae Baehr & Jocqué, 2000 — Australia (Northern Territory, South Australia, Queensland)
- C. margaretae Baehr & Jocqué, 2000 — Australia (Western Australia)
- C. martini Baehr & Jocqué, 2000 — Australia (Western Australia)
- C. mjoebergi Baehr & Jocqué, 2000 — Australia (Western Australia)
- C. tenuicalcar Baehr & Jocqué, 2000 — Australia (Western Australia)
- C. triunguis Baehr & Jocqué, 2000 — Australia (Queensland)

=== Chariobas ===
Chariobas Simon, 1893 - Storenomorphinae

- C. armatissimus Caporiacco, 1947 — Ethiopia
- C. cylindraceus Simon, 1893 (type) — Ivory Coast, Gabon, Congo, Angola
- C. lineatus Pocock, 1900 — South Africa
- C. mamillatus Strand, 1909 — South Africa
- C. navigator Strand, 1909 — South Africa

=== Chilumena ===
Chilumena Jocqué, 1995 - Storeninae

- C. baehrorum Jocqué, 1995 — Australia (Northern Territory)
- C. reprobans Jocqué, 1995 (type) — Australia (Western Australia)

=== Cicynethus ===
Cicynethus Simon, 1910 - (type) Storenomorphinae

- C. acanthopus Simon, 1910 (type) — Namibia
- C. acer Jocqué & Henrard, 2018 — Mozambique, South Africa
- C. decoratus (Lawrence, 1952) — South Africa
- C. floriumfontis Jocqué, 1991 — South Africa
- C. mossambicus Jocqué & Henrard, 2018 — Mozambique
- C. peringueyi (Simon, 1893) — South Africa
- C. subtropicalis (Lawrence, 1952) — South Africa

=== Colimarena ===
Colimarena Jocqué & Baert, 2005 - Storeninae

- C. colima Jocqué & Baert, 2005 (type) — Mexico
- C. manzanillo Jocqué & Baert, 2005 — Mexico

=== Cryptothele ===
Cryptothele L. Koch, 1872 - Cryptothelinae

- C. alluaudi Simon, 1893 — Seychelles
- C. ceylonica O. Pickard-Cambridge, 1877 — Sri Lanka
- C. collina Pocock, 1901 — India
- C. cristata Simon, 1884 — Mexico (probably false locality)
- C. doreyana Simon, 1890 — New Guinea, Australia (Queensland)
- C. marchei Simon, 1890 — New Caledonia, Mariana Is.
- C. sundaica Thorell, 1890 — Singapore, Indonesia (Sumatra, Java)
  - C. s. amplior Kulczyński, 1911 — Indonesia (Sunda Is.)
  - C. s. javana Kulczyński, 1911 — Indonesia (Java)
- C. verrucosa L. Koch, 1872 (type) — Samoa, Fiji

=== Cybaeodamus ===
Cybaeodamus Mello-Leitão, 1938 - Storeninae

- C. brescoviti Lise, Ott & Rodrigues, 2009 — Brazil
- C. enigmaticus (Mello-Leitão, 1939) — Argentina
- C. lentiginosus (Simon, 1905) — Argentina
- C. lycosoides (Nicolet, 1849) — Peru, Chile
- C. meridionalis Lise, Ott & Rodrigues, 2009 — Brazil, Paraguay, Argentina
- C. ornatus Mello-Leitão, 1938 (type) — Peru, Argentina, Uruguay
- C. taim Lise, Ott & Rodrigues, 2009 — Brazil, Argentina
- C. tocantins Lise, Ott & Rodrigues, 2009 — Brazil

=== Cydrela ===
Cydrela Thorell, 1873 - Cydrelinae

- C. albopilosa Simon & Fage, 1922 — East Africa
- C. decidua Dankittipakul & Jocqué, 2006 — Thailand
- C. escheri (Reimoser, 1934) — India
- C. friedlanderae Hewitt, 1914 — South Africa
- C. insularis (Pocock, 1899) — Yemen (Socotra)
- C. kenti Lessert, 1933 — Angola
- C. linzhiensis (Hu, 2001) — China
- C. nasuta Lessert, 1936 — Mozambique
- C. nitidiceps (Simon, 1905) — India
- C. otavensis Lawrence, 1928 — Namibia
- C. pristina Dankittipakul & Jocqué, 2006 — Thailand
- C. schoemanae Jocqué, 1991 — South Africa
- C. spinifrons Hewitt, 1915 — South Africa
- C. spinimana Pocock, 1898 — South Africa
- C. stigmatica (Simon, 1876) — Tanzania (Zanzibar)
- C. stillata (Simon, 1905) — India
- C. unguiculata (O. Pickard-Cambridge, 1871) (type) — South Africa

=== Cyrioctea ===
Cyrioctea Simon, 1889 - Cyriocteninae

- C. aschaensis Schiapelli & Gerschman, 1942 — Argentina
- C. calderoni Platnick, 1986 — Chile
- C. cruz Platnick, 1986 — Chile
- C. griswoldorum Platnick & Jocqué, 1992 — Namibia
- C. hirsuta Platnick & Griffin, 1988 — Namibia
- C. islachanaral Grismado & Pizarro-Araya, 2016 — Chile
- C. lotzi Jocqué, 2013 — South Africa
- C. marken Platnick & Jocqué, 1992 — South Africa
- C. mauryi Platnick, 1986 — Chile
- C. namibensis Platnick & Griffin, 1988 — Namibia
- C. raveni Platnick & Griffin, 1988 — Australia (Queensland)
- C. sawadee Jocqué, 2013 — South Africa
- C. spinifera (Nicolet, 1849) (type) — Chile
- C. whartoni Platnick & Griffin, 1988 — Namibia

== D-H ==
=== Diores ===
Diores Simon, 1893 - Zodariinae

- D. annetteae Jocqué, 1990 — South Africa
- D. anomalus Jocqué, 1990 — Madagascar
- D. auricula Tucker, 1920 — Zimbabwe, South Africa
- D. bifurcatus Tucker, 1920 — South Africa
- D. bivattatus Simon, 1893 (type) — South Africa
- D. bouilloni Benoit, 1965 — Congo
- D. brevis Jocqué, 1990 — Kenya
- D. capensis Tucker, 1920 — South Africa
- D. chelinda Jocqué, 1990 — Malawi
- D. cognatus O. Pickard-Cambridge, 1904 — South Africa
- D. damara Jocqué, 1990 — Namibia
- D. decipiens Jocqué, 1990 — South Africa
- D. delesserti Caporiacco, 1949 — Kenya
- D. delicatulus Lawrence, 1936 — Botswana, Zimbabwe
- D. dowsetti Jocqué, 1990 — South Africa
- D. druryi Tucker, 1920 — Namibia
- D. femoralis Jocqué, 1990 — South Africa
- D. filomenae Jocqué, 2003 — Comoros, Mayotte
- D. geraerti Jocqué, 1990 — Cameroon, Congo
- D. godfreyi Hewitt, 1919 — South Africa
- D. griswoldorum Jocqué, 1990 — Namibia
- D. immaculatus Tullgren, 1910 — Tanzania
- D. initialis Jocqué, 1990 — Kenya, Tanzania
- D. jonesi Tucker, 1920 — South Africa
- D. kenyae Berland, 1920 — Kenya
- D. kibonotensis Tullgren, 1910 — Tanzania
- D. leleupi Jocqué, 1990 — South Africa
- D. lemaireae Jocqué, 1990 — Malawi
- D. lesserti Lawrence, 1952 — South Africa, Lesotho
- D. magicus Jocqué & Dippenaar-Schoeman, 1992 — Zimbabwe
- D. malaissei Jocqué, 1990 — Congo
- D. milloti Jocqué, 1990 — Madagascar
- D. miombo Jocqué, 1990 — Malawi
- D. monospinus Jocqué, 1990 — Malawi
- D. murphyorum Jocqué, 1990 — Kenya, Tanzania
- D. naivashae Berland, 1920 — Kenya
- D. namibia Jocqué, 1990 — Namibia
- D. patellaris Jocqué, 1990 — Malawi
- D. pauper Jocqué, 1990 — South Africa
- D. poweri Tucker, 1920 — South Africa, Lesotho
- D. radulifer Simon, 1910 — Botswana, South Africa
- D. rectus Jocqué, 1990 — Malawi, South Africa
- D. recurvatus Jocqué, 1990 — South Africa
- D. russelli Jocqué, 1990 — Botswana
- D. salisburyensis Tucker, 1920 — Namibia, Botswana, Zimbabwe, Zambia
- D. seiugatus Jocqué, 1986 — Comoros
- D. sequax Jocqué, 1990 — South Africa
- D. setosus Tucker, 1920 — South Africa
- D. silvestris Jocqué, 1990 — South Africa
- D. similis Russell-Smith & Jocqué, 2015 — Tanzania
- D. simoni O. Pickard-Cambridge, 1904 — South Africa
- D. simplicior Jocqué, 1990 — Malawi
- D. spinulosus Jocqué, 1990 — South Africa
- D. strandi Caporiacco, 1949 — Kenya, Rwanda, Congo
- D. tavetae Berland, 1920 — Kenya
- D. termitophagus Jocqué & Dippenaar-Schoeman, 1992 — South Africa
- D. triangulifer Simon, 1910 — Namibia, South Africa
- D. triarmatus Lessert, 1929 — Congo
- D. univittatus Tullgren, 1910 — Tanzania
- D. youngai Jocqué, 1990 — South Africa

=== Dusmadiores ===
Dusmadiores Jocqué, 1987 - Zodariinae

- D. deserticola Jocqué, 2011 — Cape Verde
- D. doubeni Jocqué, 1987 — Togo
- D. elgonensis Vanderhaegen & Jocqué, 2017 — Uganda
- D. katelijnae Jocqué, 1987 (type) — Nigeria
- D. laminatus Russell-Smith & Jocqué, 2015 — Tanzania
- D. orientalis Jocqué & van Harten, 2015 — Yemen
- D. robanja Jocqué, 1987 — Ivory Coast

=== † Eocydrele ===
Eocydrele Petrunkevitch, 1958 - Cydrelinae

- † E. mortua Petrunkevitch, 1958 (type) — Palaeogene Baltic amber

=== Epicratinus ===
Epicratinus Jocqué & Baert, 2005 - Storeninae

- E. amazonicus Jocqué & Baert, 2005 (type) — Brazil
- E. anakin Gonçalves & Brescovit, 2020 — Brazil
- E. arlequina Gonçalves & Brescovit, 2024 — Brazil
- E. baraka Gonçalves & Brescovit, 2024 — Brazil
- E. dookan Gonçalves & Brescovit, 2020 — Brazil
- E. ehonda Gonçalves & Brescovit, 2020 — Brazil
- E. leia Gonçalves & Brescovit, 2024 — Brazil
- E. luke Gonçalves & Brescovit, 2024 — Brazil
- E. maozinha Gonçalves & Brescovit, 2024 — Brazil
- E. mauru Gonçalves & Brescovit, 2020 — Brazil
- E. omegarugal Gonçalves & Brescovit, 2020 — Brazil
- E. pegasus Gonçalves & Brescovit, 2020 — Brazil
- E. perfidus (Jocqué & Baert, 2002) — Bolivia, Brazil
- E. petropolitanus (Mello-Leitão, 1922) — Brazil
- E. pikachu Gonçalves & Brescovit, 2020 — Brazil
- E. pugionifer Jocqué & Baert, 2005 — Brazil
- E. raiden Gonçalves & Brescovit, 2024 — Brazil
- E. smeagol Gonçalves & Brescovit, 2024 — Brazil
- E. stitch Gonçalves & Brescovit, 2020 — Brazil
- E. takutu Jocqué & Baert, 2005 — Guyana, Brazil
- E. temuerai Gonçalves & Brescovit, 2024 — Brazil
- E. vader Gonçalves & Brescovit, 2020 — Brazil
- E. yoda Gonçalves & Brescovit, 2024 — Brazil
- E. zangief Gonçalves & Brescovit, 2020 — Brazil
- E. zelda Gonçalves & Brescovit, 2020 — Brazil

=== Euasteron ===
Euasteron Baehr, 2003 - Storninae

- E. atriceps Baehr, 2003 — Australia (Western Australia)
- E. bartoni Baehr, 2003 — Australia (Victoria)
- E. carnarvon Baehr, 2003 — Australia (Western Australia)
- E. churchillae Baehr, 2003 — Australia (Northern Territory)
- E. enterprise Baehr, 2003 (type) — Australia (Queensland)
- E. gibsonae Baehr, 2003 — Australia (Northern Territory, Queensland)
- E. harveyi Baehr, 2003 — Australia (Western Australia)
- E. johannae Baehr, 2003 — Australia (Western Australia)
- E. juliannae Baehr, 2003 — Australia (Western Australia)
- E. krebsorum Baehr, 2003 — Australia (New South Wales, South Australia)
- E. lorne Baehr, 2003 — Australia (New South Wales)
- E. milledgei Baehr, 2003 — Australia (New South Wales)
- E. monteithorum Baehr, 2003 — Australia (Queensland, New South Wales)
- E. raveni Baehr, 2003 — Australia (Queensland)
- E. ulrichi Baehr, 2003 — Australia (Western Australia)
- E. ursulae Baehr, 2003 — Australia (Western Australia)
- E. willeroo Baehr, 2003 — Australia (Northern Territory)

=== Euryeidon ===
Euryeidon Dankittipakul & Jocqué, 2004 - Zodariinae

- E. anthonyi Dankittipakul & Jocqué, 2004 — Thailand
- E. consideratum Dankittipakul & Jocqué, 2004 — Thailand
- E. jatashankarae Talwar, Majagi, Bodkhe & Kamble, 2018 — India
- E. katapagai Talwar, Majagi, Bodkhe & Kamble, 2018 — India
- E. monticola Dankittipakul & Jocqué, 2004 (type) — Thailand
- E. musicum Dankittipakul & Jocqué, 2004 — Thailand
- E. schwendingeri Dankittipakul & Jocqué, 2004 — Thailand
- E. sonthichaiae Dankittipakul & Jocqué, 2004 — Thailand

=== Forsterella ===
Forsterella

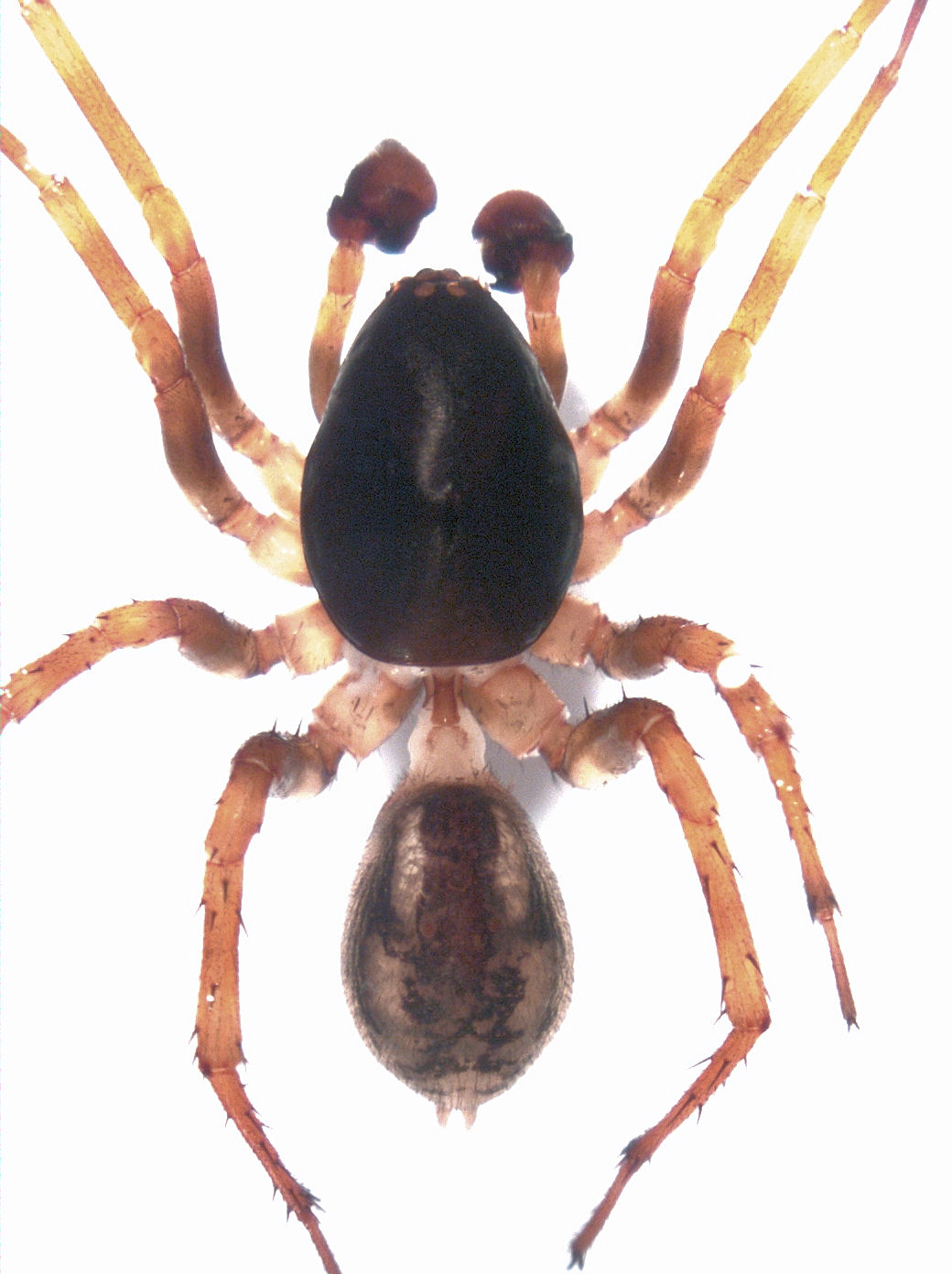
Forsterella faceta

Forsterella Jocqué, 1991 - Storeninae

- F. faceta Jocqué, 1991 (type) — New Zealand

=== Habronestes ===
Habronestes L. Koch, 1872 - Storeninae

- H. archiei Baehr, 2008 — Australia (Queensland)
- H. australiensis (O. Pickard-Cambridge, 1869) — Australia
- H. bicornis Baehr, 2003 — Australia (New South Wales)
- H. bispinosus Baehr & Raven, 2009 — Australia (Tasmania)
- H. boq Baehr, 2008 — Australia (Queensland)
- H. boutinae Baehr & Raven, 2009 — Australia (Tasmania)
- H. bradleyi (O. Pickard-Cambridge, 1869) — Australia
- H. braemar Baehr, 2008 — Australia (Queensland)
- H. calamitosus Jocqué, 1995 — Australia (Queensland)
- H. clausoni Baehr, 2008 — Australia (Queensland)
- H. dickmani Baehr, 2008 — Australia (Queensland)
- H. diocesegrafton Baehr, 2008 — Australia (New South Wales)
- H. driesseni Baehr & Raven, 2009 — Australia (Tasmania)
- H. driscolli Baehr, 2003 — Australia (New South Wales)
- H. drummond Baehr, 2008 — Australia (Queensland)
- H. epping Baehr & Raven, 2009 — Australia (Tasmania)
- H. gallowayi Baehr, 2008 — Australia (Queensland)
- H. gayndah Baehr, 2008 — Australia (Queensland)
- H. giganteus Baehr, 2003 — Australia (New South Wales)
- H. grahami Baehr, 2003 — Australia (New South Wales, Australian Capital Territory)
- H. grayi Baehr, 2003 — Australia (New South Wales)
- H. grimwadei (Dunn, 1951) — Australia
- H. gumbardo Baehr, 2008 — Australia (Queensland)
- H. hamatus Baehr, 2003 — Australia (New South Wales)
- H. hebronae Baehr, 2003 — Australia (Queensland, New South Wales)
- H. helenae Baehr, 2003 — Australia (New South Wales)
- H. hickmani Baehr & Raven, 2009 — Australia (Tasmania)
- H. hooperi Baehr, 2008 — Australia (Queensland)
- H. hunti Baehr, 2003 — Australia (New South Wales)
- H. jankae Baehr, 2008 — Australia (Queensland, New South Wales)
- H. jocquei Baehr, 2003 — Australia (New South Wales)
- H. longiconductor Baehr, 2003 — Australia (New South Wales)
- H. macedonensis (Hogg, 1900) — Australia (New South Wales, Victoria, Tasmania)
- H. minor Baehr, 2003 — Australia (New South Wales)
- H. monocornis Baehr, 2003 — Australia (New South Wales)
- H. piccolo Baehr, 2003 — Australia (New South Wales)
- H. pictus (L. Koch, 1865) — Australia (New South Wales, Australian Capital Territory)
- H. powelli Baehr, 2008 — Australia (New South Wales)
- H. pseudoaustraliensis Baehr, 2003 — Australia (New South Wales)
- H. raveni Baehr, 2003 — Australia (New South Wales, Victoria)
- H. rawlinsonae Baehr, 2003 — Australia (Queensland, New South Wales)
- H. striatipes L. Koch, 1872 (type) — Australia (Queensland)
- H. tasmaniensis Baehr & Raven, 2009 — Australia (Tasmania)
- H. thaleri Baehr & Raven, 2009 — Australia (Tasmania)
- H. tillmani Baehr, 2008 — Australia (Queensland, New South Wales)
- H. toddi (Hickman, 1944) — Australia (Northern Territory)
- H. ulrichi Baehr, 2008 — Australia (New South Wales)
- H. ungari Baehr, 2003 — Australia (Queensland, New South Wales)
- H. weelahensis Baehr, 2003 — Australia (Queensland, New South Wales)
- H. wilkiei Baehr, 2003 — Australia (New South Wales)

=== Heliconilla ===
Heliconilla Dankittipakul, Jocqué & Singtripop, 2012 - Incertae Sedis

- H. aculeata Dankittipakul, Jocqué & Singtripop, 2012 — Thailand
- H. cochleata Dankittipakul, Jocqué & Singtripop, 2012 — Vietnam
- H. crassa Dankittipakul, Jocqué & Singtripop, 2012 — Thailand
- H. furcata Dankittipakul, Jocqué & Singtripop, 2012 — Thailand
- H. globularis Dankittipakul, Jocqué & Singtripop, 2012 — Thailand, Malaysia, Singapore
- H. irrorata (Thorell, 1887) — Myanmar
- H. mesopetala Dankittipakul, Jocqué & Singtripop, 2012 — Myanmar, Thailand
- H. oblonga (Zhang & Zhu, 2009) — China, Thailand
- H. thaleri (Dankittipakul & Schwendinger, 2009) (type) — Thailand

=== Heradida ===
Heradida Simon, 1893 - Zodariinae

- H. bicincta Simon, 1910 — South Africa
- H. extima Jocqué, 1987 — South Africa
- H. griffinae Jocqué, 1987 — Namibia
- H. loricata Simon, 1893 (type) — South Africa
- H. minutissima Russell-Smith & Jocqué, 2015 — Tanzania
- H. quadrimaculata Pavesi, 1895 — Ethiopia
- H. speculigera Jocqué, 1987 — South Africa
- H. xerampelina Benoit, 1974 — South Africa

=== Heradion ===
Heradion Dankittipakul & Jocqué, 2004 - Zodarinae

- H. damrongi Dankittipakul & Jocqué, 2004 — Malaysia
- H. depressum Dankittipakul, Jäger & Singtripop, 2012 — Laos
- H. flammeum (Ono, 2004) — Vietnam
- H. intermedium Chami-Kranon & Ono, 2007 — Vietnam
- H. luctator Dankittipakul & Jocqué, 2004 — Malaysia
- H. momoinum (Ono, 2004) — Vietnam
- H. naiadis Dankittipakul & Jocqué, 2004 (type) — Thailand
- H. paradiseum (Ono, 2004) — China, Vietnam
- H. pernix Dankittipakul & Jocqué, 2004 — Malaysia
- H. peteri Dankittipakul & Jocqué, 2004 — Thailand

=== Hermippus ===
Hermippus Simon, 1893 - Storeninae

- H. affinis Strand, 1906 — Ethiopia, Somalia
- H. arcus Jocqué, 1989 — Tanzania
- H. arjuna (Gravely, 1921) — India
- H. cruciatus Simon, 1905 — India, Sri Lanka
- H. gavi Sankaran, Jobi, Joseph & Sebastian, 2014 — India
- H. globosus Sankaran, Jobi, Joseph & Sebastian, 2014 — India
- H. inflexus Sankaran, Jobi, Joseph & Sebastian, 2014 — India
- H. loricatus Simon, 1893 (type) — Central, Southern Africa
- H. minutus Jocqué, 1986 — Zimbabwe
- H. schoutedeni Lessert, 1938 — Kenya
- H. septemguttatus Lawrence, 1942 — South Africa
- H. tenebrosus Jocqué, 1986 — South Africa

=== Hetaerica ===
Hetaerica Rainbow, 1916 - Storeninae

- H. harveyi Raven & Baehr, 2000 — Australia (Western Australia)
- H. scenica (L. Koch, 1872) (type) — Australia (Queensland)

=== Holasteron ===
Holasteron Baehr, 2004 - Storeninae

- H. aciculare Baehr, 2004 (type) — Australia
- H. aspinosum Baehr, 2004 — Australia (Western Australia)
- H. driscolli Baehr, 2004 — Australia (New South Wales, South Australia)
- H. esperance Baehr, 2004 — Australia (Western Australia)
- H. flinders Baehr, 2004 — Australia (South Australia)
- H. hirsti Baehr, 2004 — Australia (South Australia)
- H. humphreysi Baehr, 2004 — Australia (South Australia)
- H. kangaroo Baehr, 2004 — Australia (South Australia)
- H. marliesae Baehr, 2004 — Australia (New South Wales)
- H. perth Baehr, 2004 — Australia (Western Australia)
- H. pusillum Baehr, 2004 — Australia (Western Australia, South Australia)
- H. quemuseum Baehr, 2004 — Australia (Queensland)
- H. reinholdae Baehr, 2004 — Australia (Western Australia)
- H. spinosum Baehr, 2004 — Australia (Western Australia, South Australia, Victoria)
- H. stirling Baehr, 2004 — Australia (Western Australia)
- H. wamuseum Baehr, 2004 — Australia (Western Australia)

== I-M ==
=== Ishania ===
Ishania

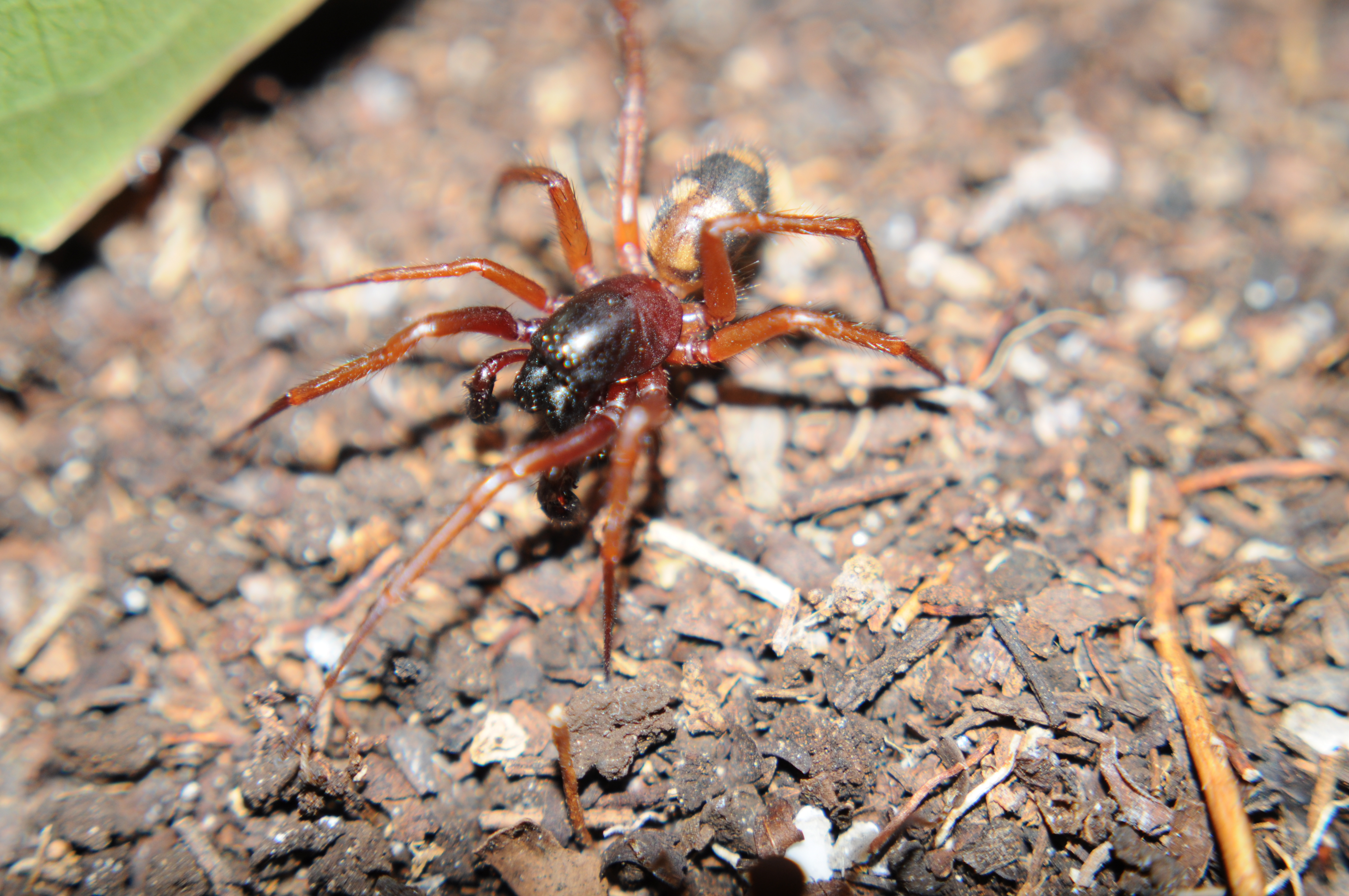
Ishania sp.

Ishania Chamberlin, 1925 - Storeninae

- I. absoluta (Gertsch & Davis, 1940) — Mexico
- I. aztek Jocqué & Baert, 2002 — Mexico
- I. centrocavata Jocqué & Baert, 2002 — Mexico
- I. chicanna Jocqué & Baert, 2002 — Mexico
- I. chichimek Jocqué & Baert, 2002 — Mexico
- I. firma Jocqué & Baert, 2002 — Mexico
- I. gertschi Jocqué & Baert, 2002 — Mexico
- I. guerrero Jocqué & Baert, 2002 — Mexico
- I. hessei (Chamberlin & Ivie, 1936) — Mexico
- I. huastek Jocqué & Baert, 2002 — Mexico
- I. ivieorum Jocqué & Baert, 2002 — Mexico
- I. latefossulata Jocqué & Baert, 2002 — Mexico
- I. maya Jocqué & Baert, 2002 — Mexico
- I. minuta Jocqué & Baert, 2002 — Honduras
- I. mixtek Jocqué & Baert, 2002 — Mexico
- I. mundella (Gertsch & Davis, 1940) — Mexico
- I. nayarit Jocqué & Baert, 2002 — Mexico
- I. oaxaca Jocqué & Baert, 2002 — Mexico
- I. ocosingo Jocqué & Baert, 2002 — Mexico
- I. olmek Jocqué & Baert, 2002 — Mexico
- I. paxoides Jocqué & Baert, 2002 — Mexico, Honduras
- I. perforata Jocqué & Baert, 2002 — Guatemala
- I. protecta Jocqué & Baert, 2002 — Mexico
- I. querci Jocqué & Baert, 2002 — Mexico
- I. real Jocqué & Baert, 2002 — Mexico
- I. relativa Jocqué & Baert, 2002 — Mexico
- I. simplex Jocqué & Baert, 2002 — Mexico
- I. tarask Jocqué & Baert, 2002 — Mexico
- I. tentativa Chamberlin, 1925 (type) — Costa Rica
- I. tinga (F. O. Pickard-Cambridge, 1899) — Mexico
- I. tormento Jocqué & Baert, 2002 — Mexico
- I. totonak Jocqué & Baert, 2002 — Mexico
- I. vacua Jocqué & Baert, 2002 — Mexico
- I. xilitla Jocqué & Baert, 2002 — Mexico
- I. zapotek Jocqué & Baert, 2002 — Mexico

=== Lachesana ===
Lachesana Strand, 1932 - Lachesaninae

- L. bayramgocmeni Özkütük, Yağmur, Gücel, Shafaie, Özden & Kunt, 2020 — Cyprus
- L. blackwalli (O. Pickard-Cambridge, 1872) — Greece, Cyprus, Turkey, Israel, Lebanon
- L. dyachkovi Fomichev & Marusik, 2019 — Kazakhstan
- L. graeca Thaler & Knoflach, 2004 — Greece
- L. insensibilis Jocqué, 1991 — Israel, Saudi Arabia, Iran
- L. kavirensis Zamani & Marusik, 2021 — Iran
- L. naxos Wunderlich, 2022 — Greece
- L. perseus Zamani & Marusik, 2021 — Iran
- L. perversa (Audouin, 1826) (type) — Egypt, Syria
- L. rufiventris (Simon, 1873) — Israel, Syria
- L. tarabaevi Zonstein & Ovtchinnikov, 1999 — Kyrgyzstan, Uzbekistan, Tajikistan

=== Laminion ===
Laminion Sankaran, Caleb & Sebastian, 2020

- L. arakuense (Patel & Reddy, 1989) — India
- L. birenifer (Gravely, 1921) (type) — India
- L. debasrae (Biswas & Biswas, 1992) — India
- L. gujaratense (Tikader & Patel, 1975) — India

=== Leprolochus ===
Leprolochus Simon, 1893 - Incertae Sedis

- L. birabeni Mello-Leitão, 1942 — Brazil, Paraguay, Argentina
- L. levergere Lise, 1994 — Brazil
- L. mucuge Lise, 1994 — Brazil
- L. oeiras Lise, 1994 — Brazil
- L. parahybae Mello-Leitão, 1917 — Brazil
- L. spinifrons Simon, 1893 (type) — Panama to Venezuela
- L. stratus Jocqué & Platnick, 1990 — Venezuela

=== Leptasteron ===
Leptasteron Baehr & Jocqué, 2001 - Storeninae

- L. platyconductor Baehr & Jocqué, 2001 (type) — Australia (Western Australia)
- L. vexillum Baehr & Jocqué, 2001 — Australia (New South Wales)

=== Leviola ===
Leviola Miller, 1970 - Incertae Sedis

- L. termitophila Miller, 1970 (type) — Angola

=== Lutica ===
Lutica Marx, 1891 - Lachesaninae

- L. abalonea Gertsch, 1961 — USA
- L. clementea Gertsch, 1961 — USA
- L. maculata Marx, 1891 (type) — USA
- L. nicolasia Gertsch, 1961 — USA

=== Malayozodarion ===
Malayozodarion Ono & Hashim, 2008 - Incertae Sedis

- M. hoiseni Ono & Hashim, 2008 (type) — Malaysia

=== Mallinella ===
Mallinella

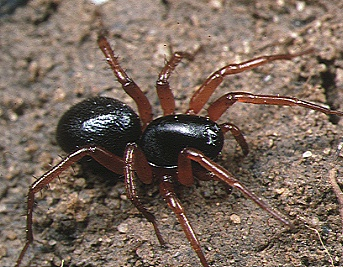
Mallinella fulvipes, female

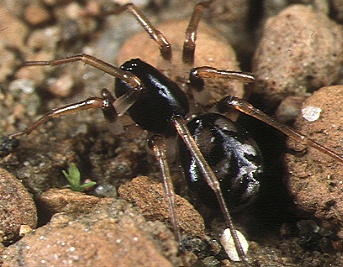
Mallinella shimojanai, female

Mallinella Strand, 1906 - Storeninae

- Mallinella abdita Dankittipakul, Jocqué & Singtripop, 2010 – Borneo
- Mallinella abnormis Dankittipakul, Jocqué & Singtripop, 2012 – Malaysia
- Mallinella acanthoclada Dankittipakul, Jocqué & Singtripop, 2012 – Thailand
- Mallinella acroscopica Dankittipakul, Jocqué & Singtripop, 2012 – Java
- Mallinella adonis Dankittipakul, Jocqué & Singtripop, 2012 – Malaysia
- Mallinella advena Dankittipakul, Jocqué & Singtripop, 2012 – Thailand
- Mallinella albomaculata (Bosmans & Hillyard, 1990) – Borneo, Sulawesi
- Mallinella albotibialis (Bosmans & van Hove, 1986) – Cameroon
- Mallinella allantoides Dankittipakul, Jocqué & Singtripop, 2012 – Thailand
- Mallinella allorostrata Dankittipakul, Jocqué & Singtripop, 2012 – Malaysia, Singapore
- Mallinella alonalon Lualhati-Caurez & Barrion, 2020 – Philippines (Luzon)
- Mallinella alticola Dankittipakul, Jocqué & Singtripop, 2012 – Thailand
- Mallinella amblyrhyncha Dankittipakul, Jocqué & Singtripop, 2012 – Malaysia
- Mallinella ampliata Dankittipakul, Jocqué & Singtripop, 2012 – Vietnam
- Mallinella angoonae Dankittipakul, Jocqué & Singtripop, 2012 – Malaysia
- Mallinella angulosa Dankittipakul, Jocqué & Singtripop, 2012 – Malaysia
- Mallinella angustata Dankittipakul, Jocqué & Singtripop, 2012 – Borneo
- Mallinella angustissima Dankittipakul, Jocqué & Singtripop, 2012 – Malaysia
- Mallinella annulipes (Thorell, 1892) – Malaysia, Singapore, Indonesia
- Mallinella apiculata Dankittipakul, Jocqué & Singtripop, 2012 – Malaysia
- Mallinella apodysocrina Dankittipakul, Jocqué & Singtripop, 2012 – New Guinea
- Mallinella atromarginata Dankittipakul, Jocqué & Singtripop, 2012 – Thailand
- Mallinella axillocrina Dankittipakul, Jocqué & Singtripop, 2012 – Solomon Is.
- Mallinella bandamaensis (Jézéquel, 1964) – Ivory Coast
- Mallinella beauforti (Kulczyński, 1911) – New Guinea
- Mallinella belladonna Dankittipakul, Jocqué & Singtripop, 2012 – Sumatra
- Mallinella bicanaliculata (B. S. Zhang & F. Zhang, 2019) – Malaysia (Borneo)
- Mallinella bicolor (Jézéquel, 1964) – Ivory Coast
- Mallinella bidenticulata Dankittipakul, Jocqué & Singtripop, 2012 – Thailand
- Mallinella bifida Dankittipakul, Jocqué & Singtripop, 2010 – Borneo
- Mallinella bifurcata Wang et al., 2009 – China
- Mallinella bigemina Dankittipakul, Jocqué & Singtripop, 2012 – Borneo
- Mallinella birostrata Dankittipakul, Jocqué & Singtripop, 2012 – Borneo
- Mallinella biumbonalia Wang et al., 2009 – China
- Mallinella bosmansi Nzigidahera, Desnyder & Jocqué, 2011 – Cameroon
- Mallinella brachiata Dankittipakul, Jocqué & Singtripop, 2012 – Thailand
- Mallinella brachyrhyncha Dankittipakul, Jocqué & Singtripop, 2012 – Malaysia
- Mallinella brachytheca Dankittipakul, Jocqué & Singtripop, 2012 – Borneo
- Mallinella brunneofusca Dankittipakul, Jocqué & Singtripop, 2012 – Thailand
- Mallinella calautica (B. S. Zhang & F. Zhang, 2019) – Malaysia (Borneo)
- Mallinella calicoanensis Dankittipakul, Jocqué & Singtripop, 2012 – Philippines
- Mallinella calilungae (Barrion & Litsinger, 1992) – Philippines
- Mallinella callicera Dankittipakul, Jocqué & Singtripop, 2012 – Thailand
- Mallinella cameroonensis (van Hove & Bosmans, 1984) – Cameroon
- Mallinella caperata Dankittipakul, Jocqué & Singtripop, 2012 – Sumatra
- Mallinella capitulata Dankittipakul, Jocqué & Singtripop, 2012 – Thailand
- Mallinella chengjiaani (Barrion, Barrion-Dupo & Heong, 2013) – China (Hainan)
- Mallinella cirrifera Dankittipakul, Jocqué & Singtripop, 2012 – Sumatra
- Mallinella clavigera Dankittipakul, Jocqué & Singtripop, 2012 – Sumatra
- Mallinella comitata Dankittipakul, Jocqué & Singtripop, 2012 – Borneo
- Mallinella concava Dankittipakul, Jocqué & Singtripop, 2012 – Sumatra
- Mallinella consona Logunov, 2010 – Vietnam
- Mallinella convolutiva Dankittipakul, Jocqué & Singtripop, 2012 – Vietnam
- Mallinella cordiformis Dankittipakul, Jocqué & Singtripop, 2012 – Sumatra
- Mallinella cryptocera Dankittipakul, Jocqué & Singtripop, 2012 – Thailand
- Mallinella cryptomembrana Dankittipakul, Jocqué & Singtripop, 2012 – New Guinea
- Mallinella cuspidata Dankittipakul, Jocqué & Singtripop, 2012 – Sumatra
- Mallinella cuspidatissima Dankittipakul, Jocqué & Singtripop, 2012 – Sumatra
- Mallinella cymbiforma Wang, Yin & Peng, 2009 – China
- Mallinella dambrica Ono, 2004 – Vietnam
- Mallinella debeiri (Bosmans & van Hove, 1986) – Cameroon
- Mallinella decorata (Thorell, 1895) – Myanmar
- Mallinella decurtata (Thorell, 1899) – Cameroon
- Mallinella denticulata Dankittipakul, Jocqué & Singtripop, 2012 – Malaysia
- Mallinella dibangensis (Biswas & Biswas, 2006) – India
- Mallinella digitata Zhang, Zhang & Chen, 2011 – China
- Mallinella dinghu Song & Kim, 1997 – China
- Mallinella dolichobilobata Dankittipakul, Jocqué & Singtripop, 2012 – Malaysia
- Mallinella dolichorhyncha Dankittipakul, Jocqué & Singtripop, 2012 – Malaysia
- Mallinella dumogabonensis (Bosmans & Hillyard, 1990) – Sulawesi
- Mallinella elegans Dankittipakul, Jocqué & Singtripop, 2012 – Malaysia
- Mallinella elongata Dankittipakul, Jocqué & Singtripop, 2012 – Malaysia
- Mallinella erratica (Ono, 1983) – Nepal
- Mallinella etindei (van Hove & Bosmans, 1984) – Cameroon
- Mallinella exornata (Thorell, 1887) – Myanmar
- Mallinella fasciata (Kulczyński, 1911) – Malaysia, Java, Bali
- Mallinella filicata Dankittipakul, Jocqué & Singtripop, 2012 – Thailand
- Mallinella filifera Dankittipakul, Jocqué & Singtripop, 2012 – Sumatra
- Mallinella flabellata Dankittipakul, Jocqué & Singtripop, 2012 – Borneo
- Mallinella flabelliformis Dankittipakul, Jocqué & Singtripop, 2012 – Malaysia
- Mallinella flagelliformis Dankittipakul, Jocqué & Singtripop, 2012 – Borneo
- Mallinella fronto (Thorell, 1887) – Myanmar
- Mallinella fulvipes (Ono & Tanikawa, 1990) – Ryukyu Is.
- Mallinella galyaniae Dankittipakul, Jocqué & Singtripop, 2012 – Thailand
- Mallinella glomerata Dankittipakul, Jocqué & Singtripop, 2012 – Thailand
- Mallinella gombakensis Ono & Hashim, 2008 – Malaysia
- Mallinella gongi Bao & Yin, 2002 – China
- Mallinella hainan Song & Kim, 1997 – China
- Mallinella hamata (Bosmans & Hillyard, 1990) – Sulawesi
- Mallinella hilaris (Thorell, 1890) – Java
- Mallinella hingstoni (Brignoli, 1982) – China
- Mallinella hoangliena Logunov, 2010 – Vietnam
- Mallinella hoosi (Kishida, 1935) – Japan
- Mallinella immaculata Zhang & Zhu, 2009 – China, Thailand
- Mallinella inflata (Bosmans & van Hove, 1986) – Cameroon
- Mallinella innovata Dankittipakul, Jocqué & Singtripop, 2012 – Thailand
- Mallinella insolita Dankittipakul, Jocqué & Singtripop, 2012 – Thailand
- Mallinella insulana Dankittipakul, Jocqué & Singtripop, 2010 – Bali
- Mallinella jaegeri Dankittipakul, Jocqué & Singtripop, 2012 – Malaysia
- Mallinella karubei Ono, 2003 – Vietnam
- Mallinella kelvini (Bosmans & Hillyard, 1990) – Sulawesi
- Mallinella khanhoa Logunov, 2010 – Vietnam
- Mallinella kibonotensis (Bosmans & van Hove, 1986) – Kenya, Tanzania
- Mallinella klossi (Hogg, 1922) – Vietnam
- Mallinella koupensis (Bosmans & van Hove, 1986) – Cameroon
- Mallinella kritscheri Dankittipakul, Jocqué & Singtripop, 2012 – Sumatra
- Mallinella kunmingensis Wang et al., 2009 – China
- Mallinella labialis Song & Kim, 1997 – China
- Mallinella langping Zhang & Zhu, 2009 – China
- Mallinella laxa (B. S. Zhang & F. Zhang, 2019) – Malaysia (Borneo)
- Mallinella leonardi (Simon, 1907) – Príncipe
- Mallinella leptoclada Dankittipakul, Jocqué & Singtripop, 2012 – Malaysia
- Mallinella linguiformis Dankittipakul, Jocqué & Singtripop, 2012 – Thailand
- Mallinella liuyang Yin & Yan, 2001 – China
- Mallinella lobata (Bosmans & Hillyard, 1990) – Sulawesi
- Mallinella longipoda Dankittipakul, Jocqué & Singtripop, 2012 – Borneo
- Mallinella maculata Strand, 1906 (type species) – Ethiopia
- Mallinella manengoubensis (Bosmans & van Hove, 1986) – Cameroon
- Mallinella maolanensis Wang, Ran & Chen, 1999 – China
- Mallinella martensi (Ono, 1983) – Nepal
- Mallinella maruyamai Ono & Hashim, 2008 – Malaysia
- Mallinella mbaboensis (Bosmans & van Hove, 1986) – Cameroon
- Mallinella mbamensis (Bosmans & van Hove, 1986) – Cameroon
- Mallinella melanognatha (Hasselt, 1882) – Sumatra
- Mallinella meriani (Bosmans & Hillyard, 1990) – Sulawesi
- Mallinella merimbunenis Koh & Dankittipakul, 2014 – Borneo
- Mallinella microcera Dankittipakul, Jocqué & Singtripop, 2012 – Vietnam
- Mallinella microleuca Dankittipakul, Jocqué & Singtripop, 2012 – Malaysia
- Mallinella microtheca Dankittipakul, Jocqué & Singtripop, 2012 – Malaysia
- Mallinella montana Dankittipakul, Jocqué & Singtripop, 2012 – Thailand
- Mallinella monticola (van Hove & Bosmans, 1984) – Cameroon
- Mallinella mucocrina Dankittipakul, Jocqué & Singtripop, 2012 – Solomon Is.
- Mallinella multicornis Dankittipakul, Jocqué & Singtripop, 2012 – Malaysia
- Mallinella murphyorum Dankittipakul, Jocqué & Singtripop, 2012 – Malaysia
- Mallinella myrmecophaga Koh & Dankittipakul, 2014 – Borneo
- Mallinella nepalensis (Ono, 1983) – Nepal
- Mallinella ngoclinha Logunov, 2010 – Vietnam
- Mallinella nigra (Bosmans & Hillyard, 1990) – Sulawesi
- Mallinella nilgherina (Simon, 1906) – India
- Mallinella nomurai Ono, 2003 – Vietnam
- Mallinella nyikae (Pocock, 1898) – Malawi
- Mallinella obliqua (B. S. Zhang & F. Zhang, 2019) – Malaysia (Borneo)
- Mallinella obtusa Zhang, Zhang & Chen, 2011 – China
- Mallinella octosignata (Simon, 1903) – Bioko
- Mallinella oculobella Dankittipakul, Jocqué & Singtripop, 2012 – Thailand
- Mallinella okinawaensis Tanikawa, 2005 – Japan
- Mallinella okuensis (Bosmans & van Hove, 1986) – Cameroon
- Mallinella onoi Dankittipakul, Jocqué & Singtripop, 2012 – Sumatra
- Mallinella oscari Dankittipakul, Jocqué & Singtripop, 2012 – Thailand
- Mallinella panchoi (Barrion & Litsinger, 1992) – Philippines
- Mallinella pantianensis (Zhong, Chen & Liu, 2022) – China
- Mallinella parabifurcata (Zhong, Chen & Liu, 2022) – China
- Mallinella pectinata Dankittipakul, Jocqué & Singtripop, 2012 – Malaysia, Borneo, Bintan Is.
- Mallinella peculiaris Dankittipakul, Jocqué & Singtripop, 2012 – Thailand
- Mallinella phansipana Logunov, 2010 – Vietnam
- Mallinella platycera Dankittipakul, Jocqué & Singtripop, 2012 – Thailand
- Mallinella platyrhyncha Koh & Dankittipakul, 2014 – Borneo
- Mallinella pluma Jin & Zhang, 2013 – China
- Mallinella ponikii (Bosmans & Hillyard, 1990) – Sulawesi
- Mallinella ponikioides (Bosmans & Hillyard, 1990) – Sulawesi
- Mallinella preoboscidea Dankittipakul, Jocqué & Singtripop, 2012 – New Guinea
- Mallinella pricei (Barrion & Litsinger, 1995) – Philippines
- Mallinella pseudokunmingensis (Yu & Zhang, 2019) – China
- Mallinella pulchra (Bosmans & Hillyard, 1990) – Sulawesi
- Mallinella punctata Dankittipakul, Jocqué & Singtripop, 2012 – Borneo
- Mallinella raniformis Dankittipakul, Jocqué & Singtripop, 2012 – Thailand
- Mallinella rectangulata Zhang, Zhang & Chen, 2011 – China
- Mallinella redimita (Simon, 1905) – India, Sri Lanka
- Mallinella reinholdae Dankittipakul, Jocqué & Singtripop, 2012 – Sumatra
- Mallinella renaria (B. S. Zhang & F. Zhang, 2018) – Laos
- Mallinella robusta Dankittipakul, Jocqué & Singtripop, 2012 – Malaysia
- Mallinella rolini Dankittipakul, Jocqué & Singtripop, 2012 – Malaysia
- Mallinella rostrata Dankittipakul, Jocqué & Singtripop, 2012 – Thailand
- Mallinella sadamotoi (Ono & Tanikawa, 1990) – Ryukyu Is.
- Mallinella scapigera Dankittipakul, Jocqué & Singtripop, 2012 – Thailand
- Mallinella scharffi Dankittipakul, Jocqué & Singtripop, 2012 – Borneo
- Mallinella sciophana (Simon, 1901) – Malaysia, Sumatra
- Mallinella selecta (Pavesi, 1895) – Ethiopia
- Mallinella septemmaculata Ono, 2004 – Vietnam
- Mallinella shimojanai (Ono & Tanikawa, 1990) – Ryukyu Is.
- Mallinella shuqiangi Dankittipakul, Jocqué & Singtripop, 2012 – China
- Mallinella silva Dankittipakul, Jocqué & Singtripop, 2012 – Thailand
- Mallinella simillima Dankittipakul, Jocqué & Singtripop, 2012 – Malaysia
- Mallinella simoni Dankittipakul, Jocqué & Singtripop, 2010 – Java, Belitung
- Mallinella slaburuprica (Barrion & Litsinger, 1995) – Philippines
- Mallinella sobria (Thorell, 1890) – Sumatra
- Mallinella sphaerica Jin & Zhang, 2013 – China
- Mallinella spiralis Dankittipakul, Jocqué & Singtripop, 2012 – Thailand
- Mallinella stenotheca Dankittipakul, Jocqué & Singtripop, 2012 – Thailand
- Mallinella suavis (Thorell, 1895) – Myanmar
- Mallinella subinermis Caporiacco, 1947 – Tanzania
- Mallinella submonticola (van Hove & Bosmans, 1984) – Cameroon, Príncipe
- Mallinella sumatrana Dankittipakul, Jocqué & Singtripop, 2012 – Sumatra
- Mallinella sundaica Dankittipakul, Jocqué & Singtripop, 2012 – Malaysia
- Mallinella superba Dankittipakul, Jocqué & Singtripop, 2012 – Borneo
- Mallinella sylvatica (van Hove & Bosmans, 1984) – Cameroon
- Mallinella thailandica Dankittipakul, Jocqué & Singtripop, 2012 – Thailand
- Mallinella thinhi Ono, 2003 – Vietnam
- Mallinella tianlin Zhang, Zhang & Jia, 2012 – China
- Mallinella tricuspidata Dankittipakul, Jocqué & Singtripop, 2012 – Malaysia
- Mallinella tridentata (Bosmans & van Hove, 1986) – Cameroon
- Mallinella triplex Nzigidahera, Desnyder & Jocqué, 2011 – Burundi
- Mallinella tuberculata Dankittipakul, Jocqué & Singtripop, 2012 – Thailand
- Mallinella tumidifemoris Ono & Hashim, 2008 – Malaysia
- Mallinella uncinata (Ono, 1983) – Nepal
- Mallinella v-insignita (Bosmans & Hillyard, 1990) – Sulawesi
- Mallinella vandermarlierei (Bosmans & van Hove, 1986) – Cameroon
- Mallinella vicaria (Kulczyński, 1911) – Java
- Mallinella vietnamensis Ono, 2003 – Vietnam
- Mallinella vittata (Thorell, 1890) – Sumatra
- Mallinella vittiventris Strand, 1913 – Congo, Rwanda
- Mallinella vokrensis (Bosmans & van Hove, 1986) – Cameroon
- Mallinella vulparia Dankittipakul, Jocqué & Singtripop, 2012 – New Guinea
- Mallinella vulpina Dankittipakul, Jocqué & Singtripop, 2012 – New Guinea
- Mallinella wiputrai Dankittipakul, Jocqué & Singtripop, 2010 – Belitung
- Mallinella zebra (Thorell, 1881) – Aru Is., New Guinea, Solomon Is., Queensland
- Mallinella zhui Zhang, Zhang & Jia, 2012 – China

=== Mallinus ===
Mallinus

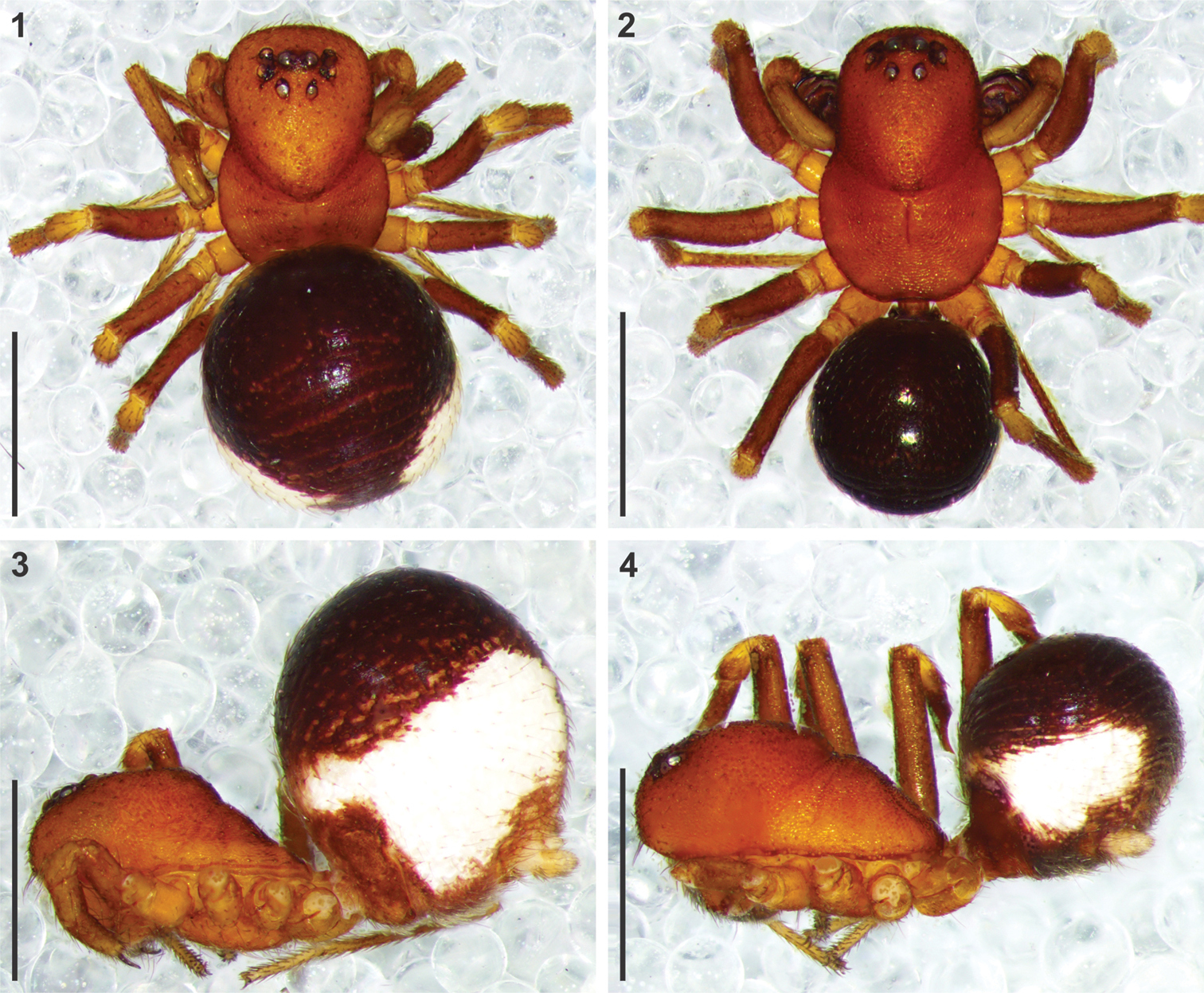
Mallinus nitidiventris

Mallinus Simon, 1893 - Zodariinae

- M. nitidiventris Simon, 1893 (type) — South Africa

=== Masasteron ===
Masasteron Baehr, 2004 - Storeninae

- M. barkly Baehr, 2004 — Australia (Northern Territory)
- M. bennieae Baehr, 2004 — Australia (Queensland)
- M. bipunctatum Baehr, 2004 — Australia (New South Wales)
- M. burbidgei Baehr, 2004 — Australia (Western Australia)
- M. clifton Baehr, 2004 — Australia (South Australia)
- M. complector Baehr, 2004 — Australia (Western Australia)
- M. darwin Baehr, 2004 — Australia (Northern Territory)
- M. derby Baehr, 2004 — Australia (Western Australia)
- M. deserticola Baehr, 2004 — Australia (South Australia)
- M. gracilis Baehr, 2004 — Australia (Western Australia)
- M. haroldi Baehr, 2004 — Australia (Western Australia)
- M. mackenziei Baehr, 2004 — Australia (Western Australia)
- M. maini Baehr, 2004 — Australia (Western Australia)
- M. mas (Jocqué, 1991) (type) — Australia
- M. ocellum Baehr, 2004 — Australia (Queensland)
- M. piankai Baehr, 2004 — Australia (Western Australia)
- M. queensland Baehr, 2004 — Australia (Queensland)
- M. sampeyae Baehr, 2004 — Australia (Western Australia)
- M. tealei Baehr, 2004 — Australia (Western Australia)
- M. tuart Baehr, 2004 — Australia (Western Australia)
- M. utae Baehr, 2004 — Australia (Northern Territory)

=== Mastidiores ===
Mastidiores Jocqué, 1987 - Zodariinae

- M. kora Jocqué, 1987 (type) — Kenya

=== Microdiores ===
Microdiores Jocqué, 1987 - Zodariinae

- M. aurantioviolaceus Nzigidahera & Jocqué, 2010 — Tanzania
- M. chowo Jocqué, 1987 (type) — Malawi
- M. rwegura Nzigidahera & Jocqué, 2010 — Burundi
- M. violaceus Nzigidahera & Jocqué, 2010 — Burundi

=== Minasteron ===
Minasteron Baehr & Jocqué, 2000 - Storeninae

- M. minusculum Baehr & Jocqué, 2000 — Australia (Western Australia)
- M. perfoliatum Baehr & Jocqué, 2000 — Australia (Western Australia, South Australia, Northern Territory)
- M. tangens Baehr & Jocqué, 2000 — Australia (Northern Territory, South Australia, Queensland)

== N-P ==
=== Neostorena ===
Neostorena Rainbow, 1914 - Storeninae

- N. grayi Jocqué, 1991 — Australia (New South Wales)
- N. minor Jocqué, 1991 — Australia (Queensland, New South Wales)
- N. spirafera (L. Koch, 1872) — Australia (Queensland)
- N. torosa (Simon, 1908) — Australia (Western Australia)
- N. venatoria Rainbow, 1914 (type) — Australia (Victoria)
- N. victoria Jocqué, 1991 — Australia (Victoria)
- N. vituperata Jocqué, 1995 — Australia (Queensland)

=== Nostera ===
Nostera Jocqué, 1991 - Storeninae

- N. geoffgarretti Baehr & Jocqué, 2017 — Australia (Queensland)
- N. lynx Jocqué, 1991 (type) — Australia (Queensland, New South Wales)
- N. spinata Baehr & Jocqué, 2017 — Australia (New South Wales)
- N. trifurcata Baehr & Jocqué, 2017 — Australia (Queensland)

=== Nosterella ===
Nosterella Baehr & Jocqué, 2017 - Storeninae

- N. cavicola Baehr & Jocqué, 2017 — Australia (Queensland)
- N. christineae Baehr & Jocqué, 2017 — Australia (Queensland)
- N. diabolica Baehr & Jocqué, 2017 — Australia (New South Wales)
- N. fitzgibboni Baehr & Jocqué, 2017 — Australia (Queensland)
- N. nadgee (Jocqué, 1995) (type) — Australia (Queensland, New South Wales, Lord Howe Is.)
- N. pollardi Baehr & Jocqué, 2017 — Australia (Lord Howe Is.)

=== Notasteron ===
Notasteron Baehr, 2005 - Storeninae

- N. carnarvon Baehr, 2005 — Australia (Western Australia)
- N. lawlessi Baehr, 2005 (type) — Australia (Northern Territory, Queensland, New South Wales, Victoria)

=== Omucukia ===
Omucukia Koçak & Kemal, 2008 - Storenomorphinae

- O. angusta (Simon, 1889) — Madagascar
- O. madrela (Jocqué, 1991) (type) — Madagascar

=== Palaestina ===
Palaestina O. Pickard-Cambridge, 1872 - Zodariinae

- P. dentifera O. Pickard-Cambridge, 1872 — Israel
- P. eremica Levy, 1992 — Egypt
- P. expolita O. Pickard-Cambridge, 1872 (type) — Greece (incl. Crete), Cyprus, Turkey, Lebanon, Israel

=== Palfuria ===
Palfuria Simon, 1910 - Zodariinae

- P. caputlari Szűts & Jocqué, 2001 — Tanzania
- P. gibbosa (Lessert, 1936) — Mozambique
- P. gladiator Szűts & Jocqué, 2001 — Namibia
- P. harpago Szűts & Jocqué, 2001 — Namibia
- P. helichrysorum Szűts & Jocqué, 2001 — Malawi
- P. hirsuta Szűts & Jocqué, 2001 — Zambia
- P. panner Jocqué, 1991 — Namibia
- P. retusa Simon, 1910 (type) — South Africa
- P. spirembolus Szűts & Jocqué, 2001 — Namibia

=== Palindroma ===
Palindroma

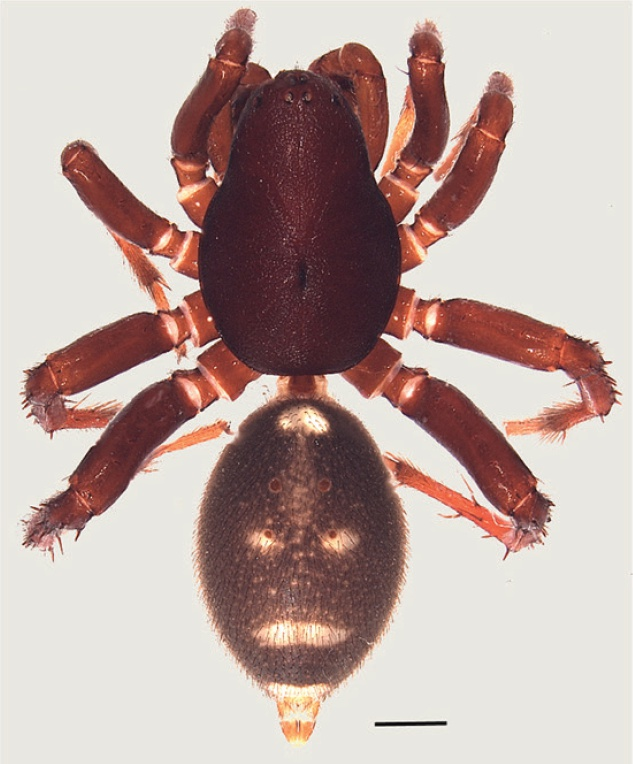
Palindroma morogorom, male

Palindroma Jocqué & Henrard, 2015 - Cryptothelinae

- P. aleykyela Jocqué & Henrard, 2015 — Tanzania, Malawi
- P. avonova Jocqué & Henrard, 2015 — Tanzania
- P. morogorom Jocqué & Henrard, 2015 (type) — Tanzania
- P. obmoimiombo Jocqué & Henrard, 2015 — Congo
- P. sinis Jocqué & Henrard, 2015 — Tanzania

=== Parazodarion ===
Parazodarion Ovtchinnikov, Ahmad & Gurko, 2009 - Incertae Sedis

- P. raddei (Simon, 1889) — United Arab Emirates, Iran, Kazakhstan, Uzbekistan, Turkmenistan, Tajikistan, Afghanistan

=== Pax ===
Pax Levy, 1990 - Storeninae

- Pax ellipita (Zamani & Marusik, 2021) — Iran
- Pax engediensis Levy, 1990 — Israel
- Pax islamita (Simon, 1873) — Turkey, Israel, Syria, Lebanon
- Pax leila (Zamani & Marusik, 2021) — Iran
- Pax libani (Simon, 1873) — Israel, Lebanon
- Pax meadi (O. Pickard-Cambridge, 1872) — Israel, Jordan
- Pax palmonii Levy, 1990 — Israel

=== Pentasteron ===
Pentasteron Baehr & Jocqué, 2001 - Storeninae

- P. intermedium Baehr & Jocqué, 2001 — Southern Australia
- P. isobelae Baehr & Jocqué, 2001 — Australia (Queensland, New South Wales)
- P. oscitans Baehr & Jocqué, 2001 — Australia (New South Wales)
- P. parasimplex Baehr & Jocqué, 2001 — Australia (Victoria)
- P. securifer Baehr & Jocqué, 2001 — Australia (Western Australia)
- P. simplex Baehr & Jocqué, 2001 (type) — Australia (Queensland, New South Wales)
- P. sordidum Baehr & Jocqué, 2001 — Australia (New South Wales, Victoria)
- P. storosoides Baehr & Jocqué, 2001 — Australia (New South Wales, Victoria)

=== Phenasteron ===
Phenasteron Baehr & Jocqué, 2001 - Storeninae

- P. longiconductor Baehr & Jocqué, 2001 (type) — Australia (Western Australia, Victoria)
- P. machinosum Baehr & Jocqué, 2001 — Australia (South Australia)

=== Platnickia ===
Platnickia Jocqué, 1991 - Storeninae

- P. bergi (Simon, 1895) — Chile, Argentina, Falkland Is.
- P. bolson Grismado & Platnick, 2008 — Chile, Argentina
- P. elegans (Nicolet, 1849) (type) — Chile, Argentina
- P. roble Grismado & Platnick, 2008 — Chile
- P. wedalen Grismado & Platnick, 2008 — Chile, Argentina, Falkland Is.

=== Procydrela ===
Procydrela Jocqué, 1999 - Cydrelinae

- P. limacola Jocqué, 1999 — South Africa
- P. procursor Jocqué, 1999 (type) — South Africa

=== † Propago ===
Propago Petrunkevitch, 1963 - Incertae Sedis

- † P. debilis Petrunkevitch, 1963 (type) — Neogene Chiapas amber

=== Psammoduon ===
Psammoduon Jocqué, 1991 - Cydrelinae

- P. arenicola (Simon, 1910) — South Africa
- P. canosum (Simon, 1910) — Namibia, South Africa
- P. deserticola (Simon, 1910) (type) — Namibia

=== Psammorygma ===
Psammorygma

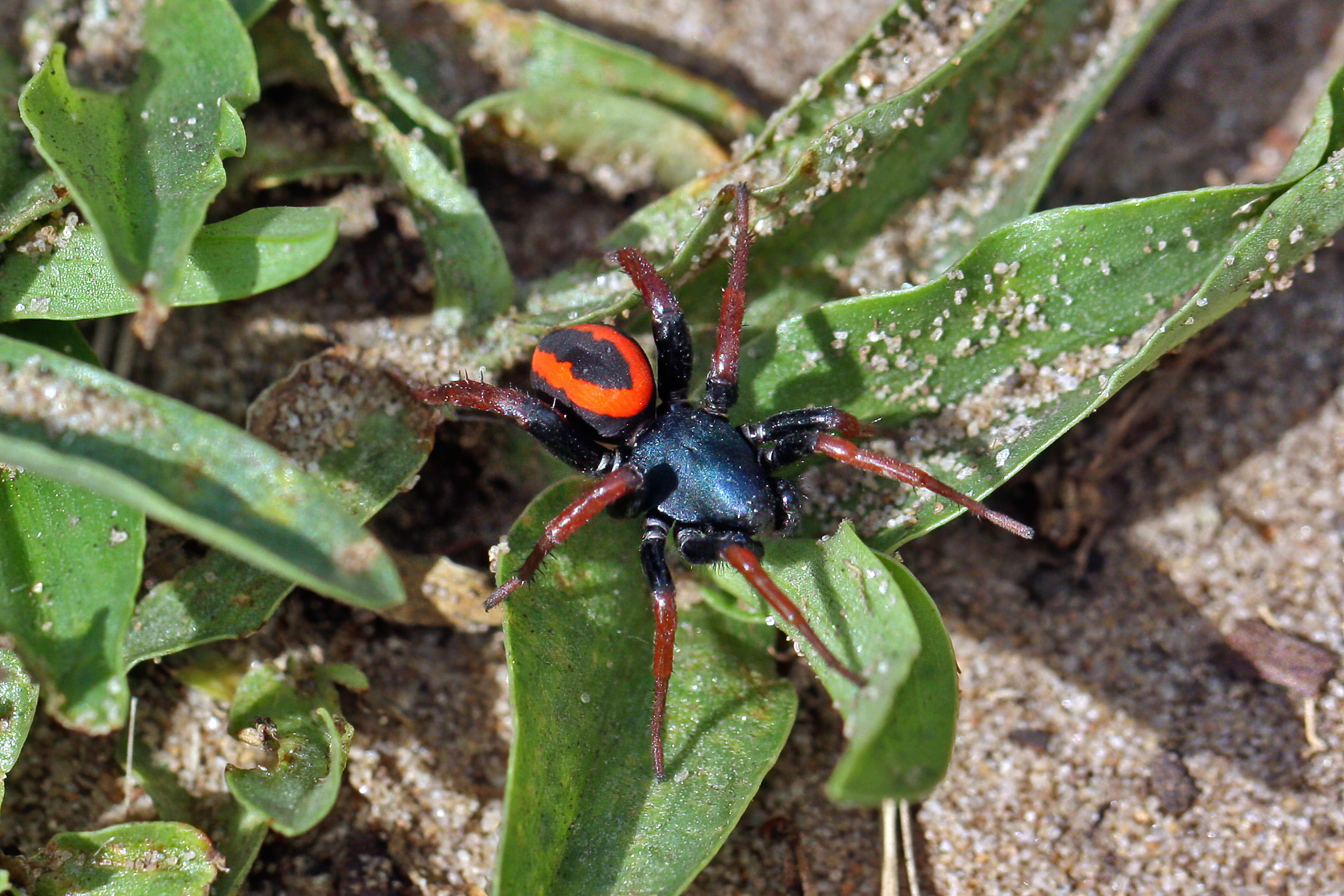
Decorated burrowing spider
(Psammorygma aculeatum)

Psammorygma Jocqué, 1991 - Cydrelinae

- P. aculeatum (Karsch, 1878) — South Africa
- P. caligatum Jocqué, 1991 (type) — Namibia
- P. rutilans (Simon, 1887) — South Africa

=== Pseudasteron ===
Pseudasteron Jocqué & Baehr, 2001 - Storeninae

- P. simile Jocqué & Baehr, 2001 (type) — Australia (Queensland)

=== Ranops ===
Ranops Jocqué, 1991 - Zodariinae

- R. caprivi Jocqué, 1991 (type) — Namibia, Zimbabwe
- R. dippenaarae Russell-Smith & Jocqué, 2015 — Tanzania
- R. robinae Jocqué & Henrard, 2020 — South Africa
- R. tharinae Jocqué & Henrard, 2020 — Botswana
- R. wandae Jocqué & Henrard, 2020 — Namibia

=== Rotundrela ===
Rotundrela Jocqué, 1999 - Cydrelinae

- R. orbiculata Jocqué, 1999 — South Africa
- R. rotunda Jocqué, 1999 (type) — South Africa

=== Selamia ===
Selamia Simon, 1873 - Storeninae

- S. numidica Jocqué & Bosmans, 2001 — Algeria, Tunisia
- S. reticulata (Simon, 1870) (type) — Western Mediterranean
- S. tribulosa (Simon, 1909) — Morocco

=== Spinasteron ===
Spinasteron Baehr, 2003 - Storeninae

- S. arenarium Baehr, 2003 — Australia (Western Australia)
- S. barlee Baehr, 2003 — Australia (Western Australia)
- S. casuarium Baehr, 2003 — Australia (Western Australia)
- S. cavasteroides Baehr & Churchill, 2003 — Australia (Western Australia, Northern Territory)
- S. knowlesi Baehr, 2003 — Australia (Western Australia)
- S. kronestedti Baehr, 2003 — Australia (Western Australia)
- S. lemleyi Baehr, 2003 — Australia (Western Australia)
- S. longbottomi Baehr, 2003 — Australia (Western Australia)
- S. ludwigi Baehr & Churchill, 2003 — Australia (Northern Territory)
- S. mjobergi Baehr, 2003 — Australia (Western Australia)
- S. nigriceps Baehr, 2003 (type) — Australia (Northern Territory)
- S. peron Baehr, 2003 — Australia (Western Australia)
- S. ramboldi Baehr & Churchill, 2003 — Australia (Northern Territory)
- S. sanford Baehr, 2003 — Australia (Northern Territory)
- S. spatulanum Baehr & Churchill, 2003 — Australia (Northern Territory)
- S. waldockae Baehr, 2003 — Australia (Western Australia)
- S. weiri Baehr, 2003 — Australia (Western Australia)
- S. westi Baehr, 2003 — Australia (Western Australia)
- S. woodstock Baehr, 2003 — Australia (Western Australia)

=== † Spinizodarion ===
Spinizodarion Wunderlich, 2004 - Zodariinae

- † S. ananulum Wunderlich, 2004 (type) — Palaeogene Baltic amber

=== Storena ===
Storena Walckenaer, 1805 - Storeninae

- S. analis Simon, 1893 — Ecuador
- S. annulipes (L. Koch, 1867) — Australia (Queensland)
- S. aspinosa Jocqué & Baehr, 1992 — Australia (South Australia)
- S. botenella Jocqué & Baehr, 1992 — Australia (South Australia)
- S. braccata (L. Koch, 1865) — Australia (New South Wales)
- S. canalensis Berland, 1924 — New Caledonia
- S. caporiaccoi Brignoli, 1983 — Venezuela
- S. charlotte Jocqué & Baehr, 1992 — Australia (Queensland, Victoria)
- S. cochleare Jocqué & Baehr, 1992 — Australia (New South Wales)
- S. colossea Rainbow, 1920 — Australia (Lord Howe Is.)
- S. cyanea Walckenaer, 1805 — Eastern Australia
- S. daviesae Jocqué & Baehr, 1992 — Australia (Queensland)
- S. deserticola Jocqué, 1991 — Australia (Northern Territory)
- S. digitulus Jocqué & Baehr, 1992 — Australia (Queensland)
- S. eximia Simon, 1908 — Australia (Western Australia)
- S. flavipes (Urquhart, 1893) — Australia (Tasmania)
- S. flavopicta (Simon, 1876) — Indonesia (Moluccas)
- S. flexuosa (Thorell, 1895) — Myanmar
- S. formosa Thorell, 1870 — Australia (mainland, Lord Howe Is.)
- S. fungina Jocqué & Baehr, 1992 — Australia (Western Australia)
- S. graeffei (L. Koch, 1866) — Australia (New South Wales)
- S. harveyi Jocqué & Baehr, 1995 — Australia (Western Australia)
- S. ignava Jocqué & Baehr, 1992 — Australia (Northern Territory)
- S. inornata Rainbow, 1916 — Australia (Queensland)
- S. kraepelini Simon, 1905 — Indonesia (Java)
- S. lebruni Simon, 1886 — Argentina
- S. lesserti Berland, 1938 — Vanuatu
- S. longiducta Jocqué & Baehr, 1992 — Australia (Queensland)
- S. maculata O. Pickard-Cambridge, 1869 — Australia (Queensland)
- S. mainae Jocqué & Baehr, 1995 — Australia (New South Wales, Victoria)
- S. martini Jocqué & Baehr, 1992 — Australia (Northern Territory)
- S. mathematica Jocqué & Baehr, 1992 — Australia (Northern Territory)
- S. metallica Jocqué & Baehr, 1992 — Australia (Queensland)
- S. nana Jocqué & Baehr, 1992 — Australia (Victoria)
- S. nuga Jocqué & Baehr, 1992 — Australia (Queensland)
- S. ornata (Bradley, 1877) — Australia (Queensland)
- S. parvicavum Jocqué & Baehr, 1992 — Australia (Queensland)
- S. parvula Berland, 1938 — Vanuatu
- S. paucipunctata Jocqué & Baehr, 1992 — Australia (Western Australia)
- S. procedens Jocqué & Baehr, 1992 — Australia (Queensland)
- S. rainbowi Berland, 1924 — New Caledonia
- S. rastellata Strand, 1913 — Central Australia
- S. raveni Jocqué & Baehr, 1992 — Australia (Queensland)
- S. recta Jocqué & Baehr, 1992 — Australia (Western Australia, Queensland, New South Wales)
- S. recurvata Jocqué & Baehr, 1992 — Australia (Queensland, New South Wales, Victoria)
- S. rotunda Jocqué & Baehr, 1992 — Australia (New South Wales)
- S. rufescens Thorell, 1881 — New Guinea, Australia (Queensland)
- S. rugosa Simon, 1889 — New Caledonia
- S. scita Jocqué & Baehr, 1992 — Australia (Queensland)
- S. silvicola Berland, 1924 — New Caledonia
- S. sinuosa Jocqué & Baehr, 1992 — Australia (Western Australia)
- S. tenera (Thorell, 1895) — Myanmar
- S. tricolor Simon, 1908 — Australia (Western Australia)
- S. variegata O. Pickard-Cambridge, 1869 — Australia (Western Australia, South Australia)
- S. zavattarii Caporiacco, 1941 — Ethiopia

=== Storenomorpha ===
Storenomorpha Simon, 1884 - Storenomorphinae

- S. abramovi Logunov, 2010 — Vietnam
- S. anne Jäger, 2007 — Laos
- S. arboccoae Jocqué & Bosmans, 1989 — Myanmar
- S. comottoi Simon, 1884 (type) — Myanmar
- S. dejiangensis Jiang, Guo, Yu & Chen, 2016 — China
- S. falcata Zhang & Zhu, 2010 — China
- S. hainanensis Jin & Chen, 2009 — China
- S. hongfuchui (Barrion, Barrion-Dupo & Heong, 2013) — China (Hainan)
- S. joyaus (Tikader, 1970) — India
- S. lushanensis Yu & Chen, 2009 — China
- S. nupta Jocqué & Bosmans, 1989 — Myanmar
- S. paguma Grismado & Ramírez, 2004 — Vietnam
- S. raghavai (Patel & Reddy, 1991) — India
- S. reinholdae Jocqué & Bosmans, 1989 — Thailand
- S. stellmaculata Zhang & Zhu, 2010 — China
- S. yizhang Yin & Bao, 2008 — China
- S. yunnan Yin & Bao, 2008 — China

=== Storosa ===
Storosa Jocqué, 1991 - Storeninae

- S. obscura Jocqué, 1991 (type) — Australia (Queensland, New South Wales)
- S. tetrica (Simon, 1908) — Australia (Western Australia)

=== Subasteron ===
Subasteron

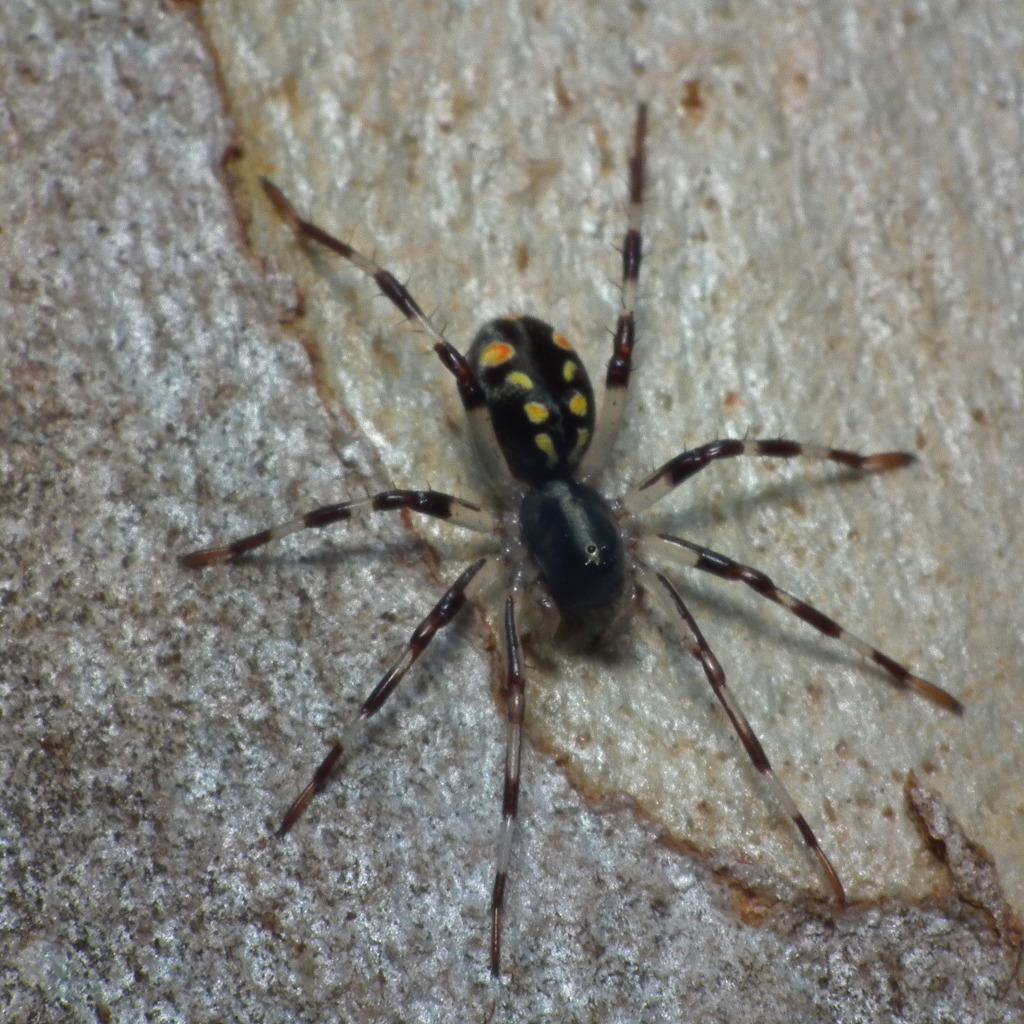
Subasteron daviesae

Subasteron Baehr & Jocqué, 2001 - Storeninae

- S. daviesae Baehr & Jocqué, 2001 (type) — Australia (Queensland)

=== Suffascar ===
Suffascar Henrard & Jocqué, 2017 - Zodariinae

- S. albolineatus Henrard & Jocqué, 2017 — Madagascar
- S. fianara Henrard & Jocqué, 2017 (type) — Madagascar
- S. fisheri Henrard & Jocqué, 2017 — Madagascar
- S. fitzpatrickae Henrard & Jocqué, 2017 — Madagascar
- S. gigas Henrard & Jocqué, 2017 — Madagascar
- S. griswoldi Henrard & Jocqué, 2017 — Madagascar
- S. macromma Henrard & Jocqué, 2017 — Madagascar
- S. micromma Henrard & Jocqué, 2017 — Madagascar
- S. nonus Henrard & Jocqué, 2017 — Madagascar
- S. scutatus Henrard & Jocqué, 2017 — Madagascar
- S. sufficiens Henrard & Jocqué, 2017 — Madagascar
- S. tofti Henrard & Jocqué, 2017 — Madagascar

=== Suffasia ===
Suffasia Jocqué, 1991 - Zodariinae

- S. ala Sen, Dhali, Saha & Raychaudhuri, 2015 — India
- S. attidiya Benjamin & Jocqué, 2000 — Sri Lanka
- S. kanchenjunga Ono, 2006 — Nepal
- S. keralaensis Sudhikumar, Jocqué & Sebastian, 2009 — India
- S. mahasumana Benjamin & Jocqué, 2000 — Sri Lanka
- S. martensi Ono, 2006 — Nepal
- S. tigrina (Simon, 1893) (type) — India
- S. tumegaster Jocqué, 1992 — Nepal

=== Suffrica ===
Suffrica Henrard & Jocqué, 2015 - Zodariinae

- S. chawia Henrard & Jocqué, 2015 — Kenya
- S. exotica Henrard & Jocqué, 2015 (type) — Tanzania
- S. gus Henrard & Jocqué, 2015 — Tanzania

=== Systenoplacis ===
Systenoplacis Simon, 1907 - Incertae Sedis

- S. biguttatus Jocqué, 2009 — Cameroon
- S. biunguis (Strand, 1913) — Central Africa
- S. fagei (Lawrence, 1937) — South Africa
- S. falconeri (Caporiacco, 1949) — Kenya
- S. giltayi (Lessert, 1929) — Congo
- S. howelli Jocqué, 2009 — Tanzania
- S. maculatus (Marx, 1893) — Central, East Africa
- S. manga Jocqué, 2009 — Tanzania
- S. maritimus Jocqué, 2009 — Tanzania
- S. michielsi Jocqué, 2009 — Kenya
- S. microguttatus Jocqué, 2009 — Tanzania
- S. minimus Jocqué, 2009 — Tanzania
- S. multipunctatus (Berland, 1920) — Kenya
- S. obstructus Jocqué, 2009 — Tanzania
- S. patens Jocqué, 2009 — Tanzania
- S. quinqueguttatus Jocqué, 2009 — Nigeria
- S. scharffi Jocqué, 2009 — Tanzania
- S. septemguttatus Simon, 1907 (type) — Guinea-Bissau
- S. thea Jocqué, 2009 — Tanzania
- S. turbatus Jocqué, 2009 — Ivory Coast
- S. vandami (Hewitt, 1916) — South Africa
- S. waruii Jocqué, 2009 — Kenya, Tanzania

== T-Z ==
=== Tenedos ===
Tenedos O. Pickard-Cambridge, 1897 - Storeninae

- T. andes Jocqué & Baert, 2002 — Colombia
- T. asteronoides Jocqué & Baert, 2002 — Ecuador
- T. banos Jocqué & Baert, 2002 — Ecuador
- T. barronus (Chamberlin, 1925) — Panama
- T. brescoviti Jocqué & Baert, 2002 — Brazil
- T. capote Jocqué & Baert, 2002 — Colombia
- T. carlosprestesi Candiani, Bonaldo & Brescovit, 2008 — Brazil
- T. certus (Jocqué & Ubick, 1991) — Costa Rica, Panama
- T. convexus Jocqué & Baert, 2002 — Venezuela
- T. cufodontii (Reimoser, 1939) — Costa Rica, Panama
- T. eduardoi (Mello-Leitão, 1925) — Brazil
- T. equatorialis Jocqué & Baert, 2002 — Ecuador
- T. estari Jocqué & Baert, 2002 — Peru
- T. fartilis Jocqué & Baert, 2002 — Ecuador
- T. figaro Jocqué & Baert, 2002 — Ecuador
- T. garoa Candiani, Bonaldo & Brescovit, 2008 — Brazil
- T. grandis Jocqué & Baert, 2002 — Panama, Ecuador
- T. hirsutus (Mello-Leitão, 1941) — Brazil
- T. hoeferi Jocqué & Baert, 2002 — Brazil
- T. honduras Jocqué & Baert, 2002 — Honduras
- T. inca Jocqué & Baert, 2002 — Peru
- T. inflatus Jocqué & Baert, 2002 — Peru
- T. infrarmatus Jocqué & Baert, 2002 — Brazil
- T. jocquei Quijano-Cuervo & Galvis, 2018 — Colombia
- T. juninus Jocqué & Baert, 2002 — Peru
- T. lautus O. Pickard-Cambridge, 1897 (type) — Guatemala
- T. ligulatus Jocqué & Baert, 2002 — Colombia
- T. major (Keyserling, 1891) — Brazil
- T. microlaminatus Jocqué & Baert, 2002 — Peru
- T. minor (Keyserling, 1891) — Brazil
- T. nancyae Candiani, Bonaldo & Brescovit, 2008 — Peru
- T. parinca Jocqué & Baert, 2002 — Peru
- T. peckorum Jocqué & Baert, 2002 — Colombia
- T. persulcatus Jocqué & Baert, 2002 — Ecuador
- T. procreator Jocqué & Baert, 2002 — Brazil
- T. quadrangulatus Jocqué & Baert, 2002 — Peru
- T. quinquangulatus Jocqué & Baert, 2002 — Peru
- T. reygeli Jocqué & Baert, 2002 — Brazil
- T. serrulatus Jocqué & Baert, 2002 — Ecuador
- T. sumaco Jocqué & Baert, 2002 — Ecuador
- T. trilobatus Jocqué & Baert, 2002 — Colombia
- T. ufoides Jocqué & Baert, 2002 — Venezuela
- T. ultimus Jocqué & Baert, 2002 — Colombia
- T. venezolanus Jocqué & Baert, 2002 — Venezuela

=== Thaumastochilus ===
Thaumastochilus Simon, 1897 - Storeninae

- T. martini Simon, 1897 (type) — South Africa
- T. termitomimus Jocqué, 1994 — South Africa

=== Tropasteron ===
Tropasteron Baehr, 2003 - Storeninae

- T. andreae Baehr, 2003 — Australia (Queensland)
- T. cardwell Baehr, 2003 — Australia (Queensland)
- T. cleveland Baehr, 2003 (type) — Australia (Queensland)
- T. cooki Baehr, 2003 — Australia (Queensland)
- T. daviesae Baehr, 2003 — Australia (Queensland)
- T. eacham Baehr, 2003 — Australia (Queensland)
- T. fox Baehr, 2003 — Australia (Queensland)
- T. halifax Baehr, 2003 — Australia (Queensland)
- T. heatherae Baehr, 2003 — Australia (Queensland)
- T. julatten Baehr, 2003 — Australia (Queensland)
- T. luteipes Baehr, 2003 — Australia (Queensland)
- T. magnum Baehr, 2003 — Australia (Queensland)
- T. malbon Baehr, 2003 — Australia (Queensland)
- T. monteithi Baehr, 2003 — Australia (Queensland)
- T. palmerston Baehr, 2003 — Australia (Queensland)
- T. pseudomagnum Baehr, 2003 — Australia (Queensland)
- T. raveni Baehr, 2003 — Australia (Queensland)
- T. robertsi Baehr, 2003 — Australia (Queensland)
- T. splendens Baehr, 2003 — Australia (Queensland)
- T. thompsoni Baehr, 2003 — Australia (Queensland)
- T. tribulation Baehr, 2003 — Australia (Queensland)
- T. yeatesi Baehr, 2003 — Australia (Queensland)

=== Tropizodium ===
Tropizodium Jocqué & Churchill, 2005 - Incertae Sedis

- Tropizodium bengalense (Tikader & Patel, 1975) – India
- Tropizodium kalami Prajapati, Murthappa, Sankaran & Sebastian, 2016 – India
- Tropizodium kovvurense (Reddy & Patel, 1993) – India
- Tropizodium molokai Jocqué & Churchill, 2005 – Hawaii
- Tropizodium murphyorum Dankittipakul, Jocqué & Singtripop, 2012 – Bali
- Tropizodium peregrinum Jocqué & Churchill, 2005 – Australia (Northern Territory). Introduced to Reunion
- Tropizodium poonaense (Tikader, 1981) – India
- Tropizodium serraferum (Lin & Li, 2009) – China
- Tropizodium siam Dankittipakul, Jocqué & Singtripop, 2012 – Thailand
- Tropizodium trispinosum (Suman, 1967) – Hawaii, French Polynesia (Society Is., Tuamotu)
- Tropizodium viridurbium Prajapati, Murthappa, Sankaran & Sebastian, 2016 – India

=== Trygetus ===
Trygetus Simon, 1882 - Zodariinae

- T. berlandi Denis, 1952 — Morocco
- T. gromovi Marusik, 2011 — Turkmenistan
- T. jacksoni Marusik & Guseinov, 2003 — Azerbaijan, Iran
- T. nitidissimus Simon, 1882 — Yemen, Djibouti
- T. rectus Jocqué, 2011 — United Arab Emirates
- T. riyadhensis Ono & Jocqué, 1986 — Egypt, Saudi Arabia
- T. sexoculatus (O. Pickard-Cambridge, 1872) (type) — Israel, Egypt

=== Workmania ===
Workmania Dankittipakul, Jocqué & Singtripop, 2012 - Incertae Sedis

- W. botuliformis Dankittipakul, Jocqué & Singtripop, 2012 (type) — Thailand, Malaysia, Singapore, Indonesia (Sumatra)
- W. juvenca (Workman, 1896) — Malaysia, Singapore, Indonesia (Borneo)

=== Zillimata ===
Zillimata Jocqué, 1995 - Storeninae

- Z. scintillans (O. Pickard-Cambridge, 1869) (type) — Australia (Western Australia, South Australia, Queensland, Victoria)

=== Zodariellum ===
Zodariellum Andreeva & Tystshenko, 1968 - Zodariinae

- Z. surprisum Andreeva & Tystshenko, 1968 (type) — Central Asia

=== † Zodariodamus ===
Zodariodamus Wunderlich, 2004 - Storenomorphinae

- † Z. recurvatus Wunderlich, 2004 (type) — Palaeogene Baltic amber

=== Zodarion ===
Zodarion

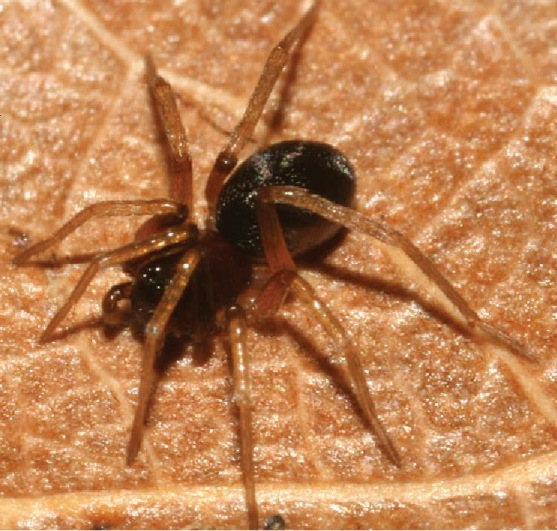
Zodarion styliferum, juvenile

Zodarion Walckenaer, 1826 - Zodariinae

- Zodarion abantense Wunderlich, 1980 – Turkey, Georgia, Russia
- Zodarion abnorme Denis, 1952 – Morocco
- Zodarion aculeatum Chyzer, 1897 – Bulgaria, Romania, Serbia, Macedonia
- Zodarion aerium Simon, 1890 – Yemen
- Zodarion affine (Simon, 1870) – Spain
- Zodarion agricola Bouseksou & Abrous, 2021 – Algeria
- Zodarion alacre (Simon, 1870) – Portugal, Spain
- Zodarion albipatellare Bosmans, 2009 – Crete
- Zodarion alentejanum Pekár & Carvalho, 2011 – Portugal
- Zodarion algarvense Bosmans, 1994 – Portugal
- Zodarion algiricum (Lucas, 1846) – Algeria
- Zodarion andalusiacum Jocqué, 1991 – Portugal, Spain
- Zodarion arabelae Bosmans, 2009 – Greece
- Zodarion arachnaio Bosmans, 2009 – Greece
- Zodarion atlanticum Pekár & Cardoso, 2005 – Portugal, Azores
- Zodarion atriceps (O. Pickard-Cambridge, 1872) – Lebanon
- Zodarion attikaense Wunderlich, 1980 – Greece
- Zodarion aurorae Weiss, 1982 – Romania
- Zodarion azrouense Bosmans & Benhalima, 2020 – Morocco
- Zodarion bacelarae Pekár, 2003 – Portugal
- Zodarion barbarae Bosmans, 2009 – Greece
- Zodarion beroni Komnenov & Chatzaki, 2016 – Greece
- Zodarion berryi Bosmans & Draney, 2018 – USA
- Zodarion beticum Denis, 1957 – Spain
- Zodarion bicoloripes (Denis, 1959) – Algeria
- Zodarion bigaense Bosmans, Özkütük, Varli & Kunt, 2014 – Turkey
- Zodarion blagoevi Bosmans, 2009 – Bulgaria, Greece
- Zodarion bosmansi Pekár & Cardoso, 2005 – Portugal
- Zodarion bozdagensis Coşar, 2021 – Turkey
- Zodarion buettikeri (Ono & Jocqué, 1986) – Saudi Arabia, Iran
- Zodarion caporiaccoi Roewer, 1942 – Italy
- Zodarion caucasicum Dunin & Nenilin, 1987 – Azerbaijan
- Zodarion cesari Pekár, 2011 – Spain, France (Corsica)
- Zodarion christae Bosmans, 2009 – Greece, Turkey
- Zodarion confusum Denis, 1935 – Italy, Turkey
- Zodarion costablancae Bosmans, 1994 – Portugal, Spain
- Zodarion costapratae Pekár, 2011 – Portugal
- Zodarion couseransense Bosmans, 1997 – France
- Zodarion crewsae (Coşar, Danışman & Kunt, 2022) – Turkey
- Zodarion cyrenaicum Denis, 1935 – Libya, Egypt, Israel
- Zodarion danismani Coşar, 2021 – Turkey
- Zodarion deccanensis (Tikader & Malhotra, 1976) – India
- Zodarion deltshevi Bosmans, 2009 – Turkey
- Zodarion diatretum Denis, 1935 – Spain
- Zodarion dispar Denis, 1935 – Algeria
- Zodarion duriense Cardoso, 2003 – Portugal
- Zodarion egens Denis, 1937 – Unknown
- Zodarion elegans (Simon, 1873) – Southern Europe, North Africa
- Zodarion emarginatum (Simon, 1873) – France, Corsica, Malta, Greece
- Zodarion emilijae (Deltshev & Naumova, 2022) – North Macedonia
- Zodarion epirense Brignoli, 1984 – Bulgaria, Greece
- Zodarion ericorum Bosmans, 2020 – Morocco
- Zodarion evvoia Bosmans, 2009 – Greece
- Zodarion expers (O. Pickard-Cambridge, 1876) – Egypt, Israel
- Zodarion fazanicum Denis, 1938 – Libya
- Zodarion frenatum Simon, 1885 – Italy, Bulgaria, Greece, Crete, Corfu, Turkey
- Zodarion fulvonigrum (Simon, 1874) – France
- Zodarion fuscum (Simon, 1870) – Britain, France, Spain, Portugal
- Zodarion gallicum (Simon, 1873) – France, Corsica, Italy, Balkans, Turkey
- Zodarion gaziantepense Danışman & Coşar, 2021 – Turkey
- Zodarion germanicum (C. L. Koch, 1837) – Europe
- Zodarion geshur Levy, 2007 – Israel
- Zodarion gracilitibiale Denis, 1934 – France, Italy
- Zodarion graecum (C. L. Koch, 1843) – Eastern Europe, Lebanon, Israel
- Zodarion granulatum Kulczyński, 1908 – Cyprus, Greece, Turkey, Lebanon, Israel
- Zodarion gregua Bosmans, 1994 – Portugal, Spain
- Zodarion guadianense Cardoso, 2003 – Portugal
- Zodarion hamatum Wiehle, 1964 – Italy, Austria, Slovenia
- Zodarion hauseri Brignoli, 1984 – North Macedonia, Bulgaria, Greece
- Zodarion immaculatum Denis, 1962 – Libya
- Zodarion imroz Dimitrov, 2020 – Bulgaria, Turkey
- Zodarion inderensis (Ponomarev, 2007) – Kazakhstan
- Zodarion isabellinum (Simon, 1870) – Spain, Morocco
- Zodarion italicum (Canestrini, 1868) – Europe
- Zodarion izmirense Danışman & Coşar, 2020 – Turkey
- Zodarion jansseni Bosmans, 2009 – Greece
- Zodarion jeanclaudeledouxi Bosmans & Benhalima, 2020 – Morocco
- Zodarion jozefienae Bosmans, 1994 – Portugal, Spain
- Zodarion judaeorum Levy, 1992 – Israel
- Zodarion kabylianum Denis, 1937 – Algeria
- Zodarion karpathos Bosmans, 2009 – Greece
- Zodarion killini Bosmans, 2009 – Greece
- Zodarion konradi Bosmans, 2009 – Greece
- Zodarion korgei Wunderlich, 1980 – Turkey
- Zodarion kossamos Bosmans, 2009 – Greece
- Zodarion kunti Coşar, Danışman & Yağmur, 2021 – Turkey
- Zodarion luctuosum (O. Pickard-Cambridge, 1872) – Israel
- Zodarion ludibundum Simon, 1914 – Corsica, Sicily, Algeria
- Zodarion lusitanicum Cardoso, 2003 – Portugal, Spain
- Zodarion lutipes (O. Pickard-Cambridge, 1872) – Cyprus, Israel, Lebanon, Jordan
- Zodarion machadoi Denis, 1939 – Portugal, Spain, Azores
- Zodarion maculatum (Simon, 1870) – Portugal, Spain, France, Sicily, Morocco
- Zodarion maghrebense Bosmans & Benhalima, 2020 – Morocco, Algeria
- Zodarion mallorca Bosmans, 1994 – Mallorca
- Zodarion marginiceps Simon, 1914 – Spain, France
- Zodarion merlijni Bosmans, 1994 – Portugal, Spain
- Zodarion mesranense Bouragba & Bosmans, 2012 – Algeria
- Zodarion messiniense Bosmans, 2009 – Greece
- Zodarion minutum Bosmans, 1994 – Spain, Mallorca, Ibiza
- Zodarion modestum (Simon, 1870) – Spain
- Zodarion montesacrense Bosmans, 2019 – Italy
- Zodarion morosoides Bosmans, 2009 – Greece
- Zodarion morosum Denis, 1935 – Macedonia, Bulgaria, Albania, Greece, Turkey, Ukraine, Russia
- Zodarion mostafai Benhalima & Bosmans, 2020 – Morocco
- Zodarion murphyorum Bosmans, 1994 – Spain
- Zodarion musarum Brignoli, 1984 – Greece
- Zodarion nesiotes Denis, 1965 – Canary Is.
- Zodarion nesiotoides Wunderlich, 1992 – Canary Is.
- Zodarion nigriceps (Simon, 1873) – Corsica, Sardinia
- Zodarion nigrifemur Caporiacco, 1948 – Greece
- Zodarion nitidum (Audouin, 1826) (type species) – North Africa, Middle East
- Zodarion noordami Bosmans, 2009 – Greece
- Zodarion odem Levy, 2007 – Israel
- Zodarion ogeri Bosmans & Benhalima, 2020 – Morocco
- Zodarion ohridense Wunderlich, 1973 – Bulgaria, North Macedonia, Croatia, Greece, Czechia
- Zodarion ovatum B. S. Zhang & F. Zhang, 2019 – Italy
- Zodarion ozkutuki Coşar & Danışman, 2021 – Turkey
- Zodarion pacificum Bosmans, 2009 – Croatia, Bosnia
- Zodarion pallidum Denis, 1952 – Morocco
- Zodarion pantaleonii Bosmans & Pantini, 2019 – Italy (Sardinia)
- Zodarion parashi Wunderlich, 2022 – Greece
- Zodarion petrobium Dunin & Zacharjan, 1991 – Azerbaijan, Armenia
- Zodarion pileolonotatum Denis, 1935 – Libya
- Zodarion pirini Drensky, 1921 – Bulgaria, Greece
- Zodarion planum B. S. Zhang & F. Zhang, 2019 – China
- Zodarion pseudoelegans Denis, 1934 – Spain, France, Ibiza
- Zodarion pseudonigriceps Bosmans & Pantini, 2019 – Italy (Sardinia)
- Zodarion pusio Simon, 1914 – France, Italy, Tunisia, Croatia, Bosnia-Hercegovina, Slovenia
- Zodarion pythium Denis, 1935 – Greece
- Zodarion remotum Denis, 1935 – Corsica, Italy
- Zodarion reticulatum Kulczyński, 1908 – Cyprus
- Zodarion robertbosmans Wunderlich, 2017 – Turkey
- Zodarion rubidum Simon, 1914 – Europe (introduced in USA, Canada)
- Zodarion rudyi Bosmans, 1994 – Portugal, Spain
- Zodarion ruffoi Caporiacco, 1951 – France, Italy, Turkey
- Zodarion samos Bosmans, 2009 – Greece
- Zodarion santorini Bosmans, 2009 – Greece
- Zodarion sardum Bosmans, 1997 – Sardinia
- Zodarion scutatum Wunderlich, 1980 – Slovenia, Croatia
- Zodarion segurense Bosmans, 1994 – Spain
- Zodarion sharurensis (Zamani & Marusik, 2022) – Azerbaijan
- Zodarion siirtensis Coşar, 2021 – Turkey
- Zodarion simplex Jocqué, 2011 – United Arab Emirates
- Zodarion soror (Simon, 1873) – Corsica
- Zodarion spinibarbe Wunderlich, 1973 – Crete
- Zodarion styliferum (Simon, 1870) – Portugal, Spain, Madeira
  - Zodarion styliferum extraneum (Denis, 1935) – Portugal
- Zodarion sungar (Jocqué, 1991) – Turkey, Iraq
- Zodarion talyschicum Dunin & Nenilin, 1987 – Azerbaijan, Iran
- Zodarion thoni Nosek, 1905 – Eastern Europe to Azerbaijan
- Zodarion timidum (Simon, 1874) – Spain, France
- Zodarion trianguliferum Denis, 1952 – Morocco
- Zodarion tuber (Wunderlich, 2022) – Portugal
- Zodarion tunetiacum Strand, 1906 – Tunisia
- Zodarion turcicum Wunderlich, 1980 – Bulgaria, Greece, Turkey
- Zodarion turkesi Coşar & Danışman, 2021 – Turkey
- Zodarion valentii Bosmans, Loverre & Addante, 2019 – Morocco, Algeria, Spain, Italy
- Zodarion van Bosmans, 2009 – Turkey
- Zodarion vanimpei Bosmans, 1994 – Spain
- Zodarion vankeerorum Bosmans, 2009 – Greece
- Zodarion varoli Akpınar, 2016 – Turkey
- Zodarion vicinum Denis, 1935 – England, Italy
- Zodarion viduum Denis, 1937 – Portugal
- Zodarion walsinghami Denis, 1937 – Algeria
- Zodarion weissi (Deltshev & Naumova, 2022) – Bulgaria
- Zodarion wesolowskae Bosmans & Benhalima, 2020 – Morocco
- Zodarion yagmuri Coşar & Danışman, 2021 – Turkey
- Zodarion yemenensis Jocqué & van Harten, 2015 – Yemen
- Zodarion zorba Bosmans, 2009 – Greece
