= Caesetius politus =

Scientific classification
- Kingdom: Animalia
- Phylum: Arthropoda
- Subphylum: Chelicerata
- Class: Arachnida
- Order: Araneae
- Infraorder: Araneomorphae
- Family: Zodariidae
- Genus: Caesetius
- Species: C. politus

Binomial name
- Caesetius politus Simon, 1893

Synonyms
- Tryssoclitus politus Simon, 1910

Species of spider

Caesetius politus is a species of spider in the family Zodariidae. It is endemic to South Africa. The species is considered a probable nomen dubium as it is known only from juvenile specimens.

== Distribution ==
Caesetius politus is known only from Makapansgat in Limpopo province, South Africa.

== Habitat ==
The type locality is situated in the Savanna biome at an altitude of 1417 m above sea level.

== Description ==
Descriptions of the species are brief, and known only from a juvenile specimen. The carapace and chelicerae are pale brown, while the sternum and legs are yellow. The opisthosoma dorsum is grey with a series of seven chevrons in front of the spinnerets, mottled sides, and a pale venter with two longitudinal dark stripes. The description resembles that of Caesetius inflatus.

== Ecology ==
Caesetius politus are presumed to be free-living ground-dwellers like other members of the genus.

== Conservation ==
The species is listed as Data Deficient due to insufficient knowledge about its habitat, distribution, and threats. More sampling is needed to collect adult specimens and determine the species' true range.
