= Caesetius biprocessiger =

Ingwavuma Caesetius Zodariid spider

Conservation status
- Least Concern (SANBI Red List)

Scientific classification
- Kingdom: Animalia
- Phylum: Arthropoda
- Subphylum: Chelicerata
- Class: Arachnida
- Order: Araneae
- Infraorder: Araneomorphae
- Family: Zodariidae
- Genus: Caesetius
- Species: C. biprocessiger

Binomial name
- Caesetius biprocessiger (Lawrence, 1952)

Synonyms
- Cydrelichus biprocessiger Lawrence, 1952

Species of spider

Caesetius biprocessiger is a species of spider in the family Zodariidae. It is endemic to South Africa and is commonly known as the Ingwavuma Caesetius Zodariid spider.

== Distribution ==
Caesetius biprocessiger is endemic to KwaZulu-Natal province in South Africa, where it has been recorded from several localities including Ingwavuma, iSimangaliso Wetland Park, Sodwana Bay National Park, and Umfolozi Nature Reserve. The species likely also occurs in southern Mozambique.

== Habitat ==
The species inhabits the Savanna biome at altitudes ranging from 43 to 1345 m above sea level.

== Description ==
Both males and females are known for this species. The carapace and mandibles are almost black, while the sternum and legs are blackish-brown. The tibiae and distal segments of anterior legs are red, and those of posterior legs are brown. The opisthosoma is black dorsally with a yellow marking consisting of a central black lanceolate marking bordered by yellow. The ventral surface is black with a pair of straight white or yellow stripes.

== Ecology ==
Caesetius biprocessiger are free-living ground-dwellers.

== Conservation ==
The species is listed as Least Concern by the South African National Biodiversity Institute. Much natural habitat remains within its range and large areas are protected, including Tembe Elephant Park, iSimangaliso Wetland Park, Sodwana Bay National Park, and Umfolozi Nature Reserve.
