= Caesetius globicoxis =

Kosi Bay Caesetius Zodariid spider

Conservation status
- Least Concern (SANBI Red List)

Scientific classification
- Kingdom: Animalia
- Phylum: Arthropoda
- Subphylum: Chelicerata
- Class: Arachnida
- Order: Araneae
- Infraorder: Araneomorphae
- Family: Zodariidae
- Genus: Caesetius
- Species: C. globicoxis

Binomial name
- Caesetius globicoxis (Lawrence, 1942)

Synonyms
- Cydrelichus globicoxis Lawrence, 1942

Species of spider

Caesetius globicoxis is a species of spider in the family Zodariidae. It is endemic to South Africa and is commonly known as the Kosi Bay Caesetius Zodariid spider.

== Distribution ==
Caesetius globicoxis is endemic to South Africa, where it has been recorded from five provinces: Eastern Cape, KwaZulu-Natal, Mpumalanga, Limpopo, and Western Cape. Notable localities include Kosi Bay Nature Reserve, Ndumo Game Reserve, De Hoop Nature Reserve, and Kogelberg Nature Reserve.

== Habitat ==
The species inhabits multiple biomes including Fynbos, Indian Ocean Coastal Belt, Nama Karoo, and Savanna biomes at altitudes ranging from 15 to 1698 m above sea level. It has a widespread distribution.

== Description ==
Only males are currently known for this species. The carapace is dark reddish-brown with scattered white hairs that are more numerous on the cephalic portion. The legs and pedipalps are brown, with legs being paler at their apices. The opisthosoma is smoky black above with four white spots in the anterior half and a white bar above the spinnerets, along with several whitish chevron markings.

== Ecology ==
Caesetius globicoxis are free-living ground-dwellers.

== Conservation ==
The species is listed as Least Concern by the South African National Biodiversity Institute. Despite being known only from males, it has a wide geographical range and is protected in multiple reserves including De Hoop Nature Reserve, Ndumo Game Reserve, and Addo Elephant National Park.
