= Platnickia elegans =

Scientific classification
- Domain: Eukaryota
- Kingdom: Animalia
- Phylum: Arthropoda
- Subphylum: Chelicerata
- Class: Arachnida
- Order: Araneae
- Infraorder: Araneomorphae
- Family: Zodariidae
- Genus: Platnickia
- Species: P. elegans

Binomial name
- Platnickia elegans (Nicolet, 1849)

Synonyms
- Drassus elegans Nicolet, 1849; Storena elegans Simon, 1889

Species of spider

Platnickia elegans is a species of spiders in the family Zodariidae. It is found in Chile and Argentina.
