= Zillimata =

Scientific classification
- Domain: Eukaryota
- Kingdom: Animalia
- Phylum: Arthropoda
- Subphylum: Chelicerata
- Class: Arachnida
- Order: Araneae
- Infraorder: Araneomorphae
- Family: Zodariidae
- Genus: Zillimata
- Species: Z. scintillans

Binomial name
- Zillimata scintillans (O. Pickard-Cambridge, 1869)

Genus of spiders

Zillimata is a genus of spiders in the family Zodariidae. It was first described in 1995 by Jocqué. As of 2017, it contains only one species, Zillimata scintillans, found in Australia.
