= Caesetius murinus =

Cape Caesetius Zodariid spider

Conservation status
- Least Concern (SANBI Red List)

Scientific classification
- Kingdom: Animalia
- Phylum: Arthropoda
- Subphylum: Chelicerata
- Class: Arachnida
- Order: Araneae
- Infraorder: Araneomorphae
- Family: Zodariidae
- Genus: Caesetius
- Species: C. murinus

Binomial name
- Caesetius murinus Simon, 1893

Species of spider

Caesetius murinus is a species of spider in the family Zodariidae. It is the type species of the genus Caesetius and is endemic to South Africa, commonly known as the Cape Caesetius Zodariid spider.

== Etymology ==
The species name murinus means "mouse-colored" in Latin, referring to the greyish coloration of the spider.

== Distribution ==
Caesetius murinus is endemic to South Africa, where it has been recorded from two provinces: Eastern Cape and Western Cape. Notable localities include Cape Town, Table Mountain National Park, Addo Elephant National Park, and Port Elizabeth.

== Habitat ==
The species inhabits Fynbos and Thicket biomes at altitudes ranging from 7 to 1479 m above sea level.

== Description ==
Both males and females are known for this species. The carapace is medium brown, slightly paler in the cephalic area, with numerous fine silvery hairs and few stronger, darker hairs between the fovea and eyes. The clypeus has a dense cluster of hairs. The chelicerae and legs are medium to dark brown, while the sternum is pale brown. The opisthosoma is mottled grey and white with pale markings on the dorsum.

== Ecology ==
Caesetius murinus are free-living ground-dwellers.

== Conservation ==
The species is listed as Least Concern by the South African National Biodiversity Institute due to its wide geographical range. It is protected in Addo Elephant National Park, Table Mountain National Park, and Asante Game Reserve.
