= Caesetius schultzei =

Schultze's Caesetius Zodariid spider

Conservation status
- Least Concern (SANBI Red List)

Scientific classification
- Kingdom: Animalia
- Phylum: Arthropoda
- Subphylum: Chelicerata
- Class: Arachnida
- Order: Araneae
- Infraorder: Araneomorphae
- Family: Zodariidae
- Genus: Caesetius
- Species: C. schultzei

Binomial name
- Caesetius schultzei Simon, 1910

Species of spider

Caesetius schultzei is a species of spider in the family Zodariidae. It is endemic to South Africa and is commonly known as Schultze's Caesetius Zodariid spider.

== Distribution ==
Caesetius schultzei is endemic to South Africa, where it has been recorded from two provinces: Northern Cape and Western Cape. Notable localities include Kamaggas, Namaqua National Park, Cape Town, Table Mountain National Park, and Kirstenbosch National Botanical Garden.

== Habitat ==
The species inhabits Desert, Fynbos, and Succulent Karoo biomes at altitudes ranging from 5 to 1069 m above sea level.

== Description ==
Both males and females are known for this species. The carapace is medium brown with the cephalic part being paler, sparsely covered with pale silvery hairs and a cluster of darker, stronger hairs on the clypeus. The chelicerae are medium brown, while the sternum and legs are pale brown with femora being slightly darker. The opisthosoma is mottled grey and white with distinctive markings including a pale median stripe, white spots on apodemes, and numerous reddish hairs dorsally.

== Ecology ==
Caesetius schultzei are free-living ground-dwellers.

== Conservation ==
The species is listed as Least Concern by the South African National Biodiversity Institute due to its wide geographical range. It is protected in Table Mountain National Park, Kirstenbosch National Botanical Garden, Namaqua National Park, and Richtersveld Transfrontier National Park.
