= Caesetius bevisi =

Bevis' Caesetius Zodariid spider

Conservation status
- Least Concern (SANBI Red List)

Scientific classification
- Kingdom: Animalia
- Phylum: Arthropoda
- Subphylum: Chelicerata
- Class: Arachnida
- Order: Araneae
- Infraorder: Araneomorphae
- Family: Zodariidae
- Genus: Caesetius
- Species: C. bevisi

Binomial name
- Caesetius bevisi (Hewitt, 1916)

Synonyms
- Tryssoclitus bevisi Hewitt, 1916

Species of spider

Caesetius bevisi is a species of spider in the family Zodariidae. It is endemic to southern Africa and is commonly known as Bevis' Caesetius Zodariid spider.

== Distribution ==
Caesetius bevisi occurs in Mozambique and South Africa. In South Africa, the species has been recorded from KwaZulu-Natal and Limpopo provinces, with localities including iSimangaliso Wetland Park, Ndumo Game Reserve, uMkhuze Game Reserve, Tembe Elephant Park, and several nature reserves in Limpopo.

== Habitat ==
The species inhabits the Savanna biome at altitudes ranging from 44 to 1345 m above sea level. It has a widespread distribution across its range.

== Description ==
Female specimens have a dark chestnut brown carapace sparsely covered with fine silvery setae, with a dense cluster of fine hairs on the clypeus. The chelicerae and femora are dark brown, while the remainder of the legs and sternum are medium brown. The opisthosoma is mottled with white and grey markings on the dorsum and sides, with the venter being pale and featuring three longitudinal black lines.

== Ecology ==
Caesetius bevisi are free-living ground-dwellers that are crepuscular, actively foraging on the soil during late afternoon and early evening hours.

== Conservation ==
The species is listed as Least Concern by the South African National Biodiversity Institute. Despite being known only from female specimens, it has a wide geographical range and is protected in seven protected areas, including Lekgalameetse Nature Reserve and Ndumo Game Reserve.
