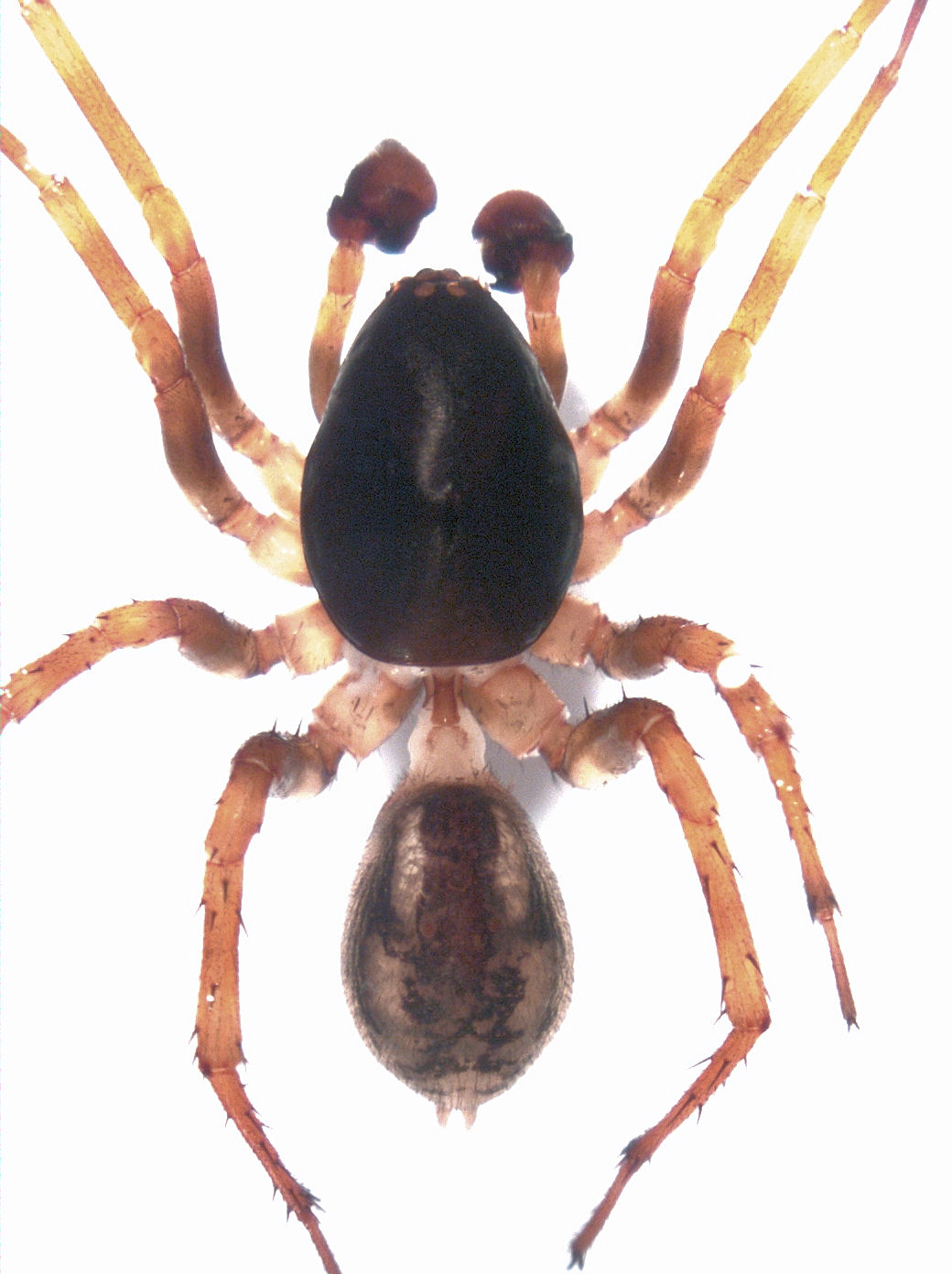

Conservation status
- Not Threatened (NZ TCS)

Scientific classification
- Kingdom: Animalia
- Phylum: Arthropoda
- Subphylum: Chelicerata
- Class: Arachnida
- Order: Araneae
- Infraorder: Araneomorphae
- Family: Zodariidae
- Genus: Forsterella
- Species: F. faceta

Binomial name
- Forsterella faceta Jocqué, 1991

= Forsterella =

Genus of spiders

Forsterella is a genus of spiders in the family Zodariidae. It was first described in 1991 by Jocqué. As of 2017, it contains only one species, Forsterella faceta, found in New Zealand.

== Taxonomy ==
This species was described by Rudy Jocqué in 1991 from male and female specimens. The holotype is stored in the New Zealand Arthropod Collection under registration number NZAC03015019.

== Description ==
The male is recorded at 3.91-5.41mm in length whereas the female is 4.33-7.75mm. The carapace is coloured dark reddish brown. The legs are orangish with dark sections. The abdomen is darkly coloured with various pale markings dorsally.

== Distribution ==
This species is only known from the North Island of New Zealand.

== Conservation status ==
Under the New Zealand Threat Classification System, this species is listed as "Not Threatened".
