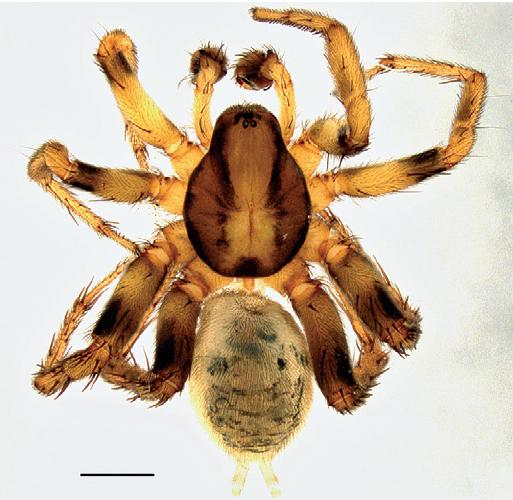

Scientific classification
- Kingdom: Animalia
- Phylum: Arthropoda
- Subphylum: Chelicerata
- Class: Arachnida
- Order: Araneae
- Infraorder: Araneomorphae
- Family: Zodariidae
- Genus: Australutica
- Species: A. africana

Binomial name
- Australutica africana Jocqué, 2008

= Australutica africana =

Species of spider

Australutica africana is a species of spider in the family Zodariidae. It is endemic to South Africa.

== Distribution ==
Australutica africana is endemic to the Limpopo province of South Africa, where it has been recorded from several localities including Lhuvhondo Nature Reserve, various sites in the Vhembe Biosphere, and Marakele National Park.

== Habitat ==
The species inhabits the Savanna biome at altitudes ranging from 955 to 1,486 metres above sea level. It occurs in woodland and grassland environments where it is found under rocks.

== Description ==
Males of Australutica africana have a total length of 5.0 mm. The cephalothorax is yellow with darkened margins, two black longitudinal bands, and a black spot behind the fovea. The opisthosoma is pale with a darker pattern forming pale chevrons on the posterior part. Females remain undescribed.

== Ecology ==
Australutica africana are free-living ground-dwellers that are typically sampled using pitfall traps. The species appears to be rare and is infrequently collected.

== Conservation ==
The species is listed as Rare due to its restricted distribution within Limpopo province. While not currently threatened, more sampling is needed to fully understand its range and collect the undescribed female.
