= Caesetius flavoplagiatus =

Northern Cape Caesetius Zodariid spider

Conservation status
- Least Concern (SANBI Red List)

Scientific classification
- Kingdom: Animalia
- Phylum: Arthropoda
- Subphylum: Chelicerata
- Class: Arachnida
- Order: Araneae
- Infraorder: Araneomorphae
- Family: Zodariidae
- Genus: Caesetius
- Species: C. flavoplagiatus

Binomial name
- Caesetius flavoplagiatus Simon, 1910

Species of spider

Caesetius flavoplagiatus is a species of spider in the family Zodariidae. It occurs in southern Africa and is commonly known as the Northern Cape Caesetius Zodariid spider.

== Distribution ==
Caesetius flavoplagiatus occurs in Namibia and South Africa. In South Africa, it has been recorded from the Northern Cape province, including localities such as Steinkopf, Augrabies National Park, Richtersveld National Park, and Tswalu Game Reserve.

== Habitat ==
The species inhabits multiple biomes including Desert, Succulent Karoo, Nama Karoo, and Savanna biomes at altitudes ranging from 250 to 1155 m above sea level.

== Description ==
Both males and females are known for this species. The carapace is medium brown and sparsely covered with fine silvery hairs, with few dark hairs between the fovea and eyes. The chelicerae are medium brown, while the sternum and legs are pale brown. The opisthosoma displays a distinctive black and white pattern on the dorsum, with a pale spot in front followed by a narrower line and a patch in front of the spinnerets.

== Ecology ==
Caesetius flavoplagiatus are free-living ground-dwellers.

== Conservation ==
The species is listed as Least Concern by the South African National Biodiversity Institute due to its wide geographical range. It is protected in Richtersveld National Park and Tswalu Game Reserve.
