= Platnickia =

Scientific classification
- Kingdom: Animalia
- Phylum: Arthropoda
- Subphylum: Chelicerata
- Class: Arachnida
- Order: Araneae
- Infraorder: Araneomorphae
- Family: Zodariidae
- Genus: Platnickia; Jocqué

Type species
- Platnickia elegans

Species
- Platnickia bergi (Simon, 1895); Platnickia bolson Grismado & Platnick, 2008; Platnickia elegans (Nicolet, 1849); Platnickia roble Grismado & Platnick, 2008; Platnickia wedalen Grismado & Platnick, 2008

Genus of spiders

Platnickia is a genus of spiders in the family Zodariidae. It was first described in 1991 by Jocqué. As of 2017, it contains 5 South American species.
