= Caesetius spenceri =

Scientific classification
- Kingdom: Animalia
- Phylum: Arthropoda
- Subphylum: Chelicerata
- Class: Arachnida
- Order: Araneae
- Infraorder: Araneomorphae
- Family: Zodariidae
- Genus: Caesetius
- Species: C. spenceri

Binomial name
- Caesetius spenceri (Pocock, 1900)

Synonyms
- Cydrelichus spenceri Pocock, 1900

Species of spider

Caesetius spenceri is a species of spider in the family Zodariidae. It is endemic to South Africa.

== Distribution ==
Caesetius spenceri is endemic to the Eastern Cape province of South Africa, where it has been recorded from localities including Port Elizabeth, Addo Elephant National Park, and East London.

== Habitat ==
The species inhabits the Thicket biome at altitudes ranging from 7 to 1,415 m above sea level.

== Description ==
Known only from immature females. The carapace is deep castaneous (chestnut-colored), while the legs are clearer and scantily clothed with whitish and blackish hairs. The opisthosoma is ashy black, covered above and below with a scanty clothing of whitish and darker hairs, and ornamented beneath with four pale lines.

== Ecology ==
Caesetius spenceri are presumed to be free-living ground-dwellers like other members of the genus.

== Conservation ==
The species is listed as Data Deficient because it is known only from subadult specimens. More sampling is needed to discover and describe adult specimens. It is protected in Addo Elephant National Park.
