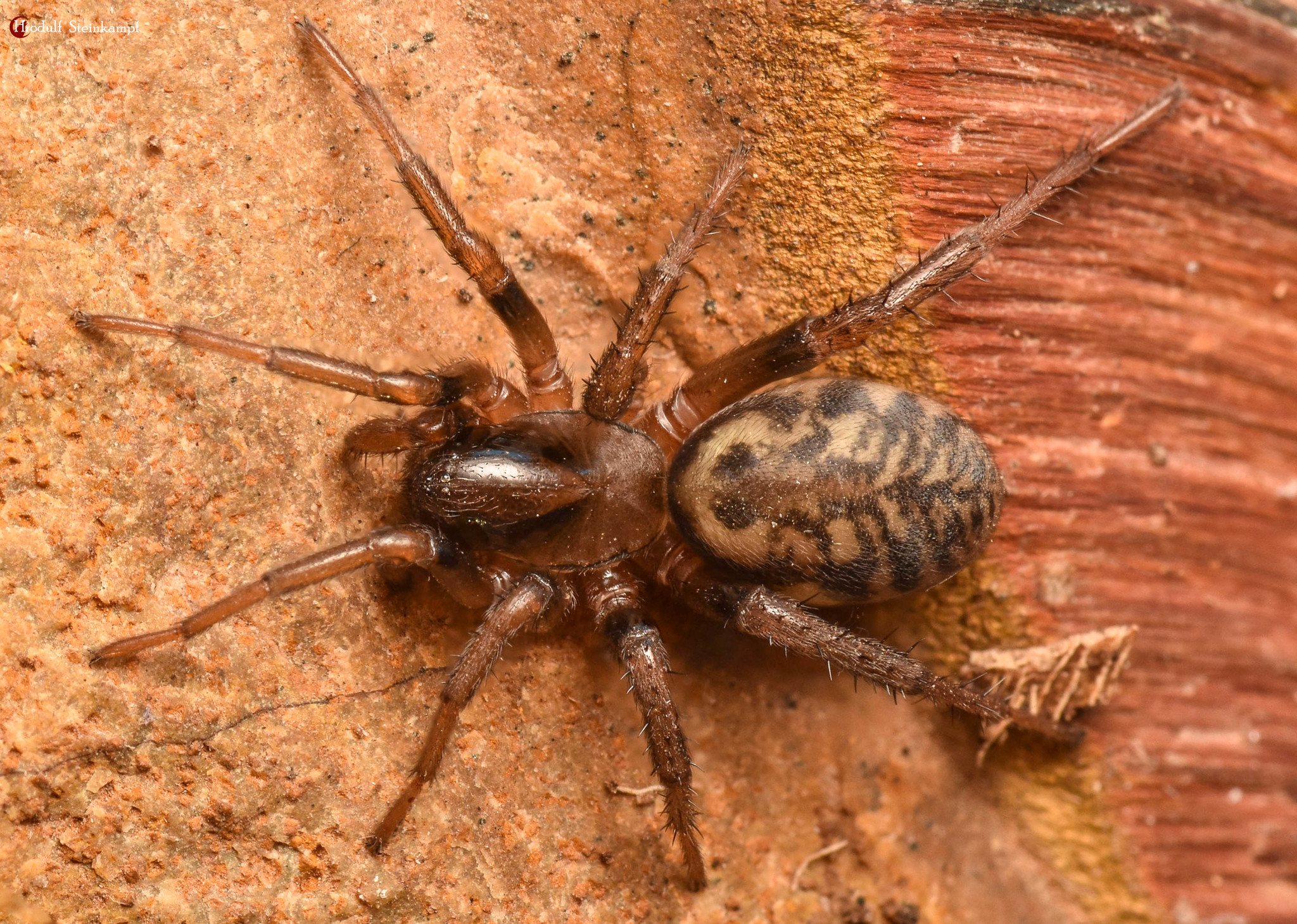
- Caesetius sp. from South Africa

Scientific classification
- Kingdom: Animalia
- Phylum: Arthropoda
- Subphylum: Chelicerata
- Class: Arachnida
- Order: Araneae
- Infraorder: Araneomorphae
- Family: Zodariidae
- Genus: Caesetius; Simon

Type species
- Caesetius murinus

Species
- 10, see text

= Caesetius =

Genus of spiders

Caesetius is a genus of spiders in the family Zodariidae. It was first described in 1893 by Eugène Louis Simon. As of 2024, it contains 10 species from southern Africa.

== Species ==
As of September 2025, this genus includes ten species:

- Caesetius bevisi (Hewitt, 1916) – Mozambique, South Africa
- Caesetius biprocessiger (Lawrence, 1952) – South Africa
- Caesetius flavoplagiatus Simon, 1910 – Namibia, South Africa
- Caesetius globicoxis (Lawrence, 1942) – South Africa
- Caesetius inflatus Jocqué, 1991 – Malawi, Mozambique, South Africa
- Caesetius murinus Simon, 1893 – South Africa (type species)
- Caesetius politus Simon, 1893 – South Africa
- Caesetius rosei (Bacelar, 1953) – Mozambique
- Caesetius schultzei Simon, 1910 – South Africa
- Caesetius spenceri (Pocock, 1900) – South Africa
