= Leviola =

Scientific classification
- Domain: Eukaryota
- Kingdom: Animalia
- Phylum: Arthropoda
- Subphylum: Chelicerata
- Class: Arachnida
- Order: Araneae
- Infraorder: Araneomorphae
- Family: Zodariidae
- Genus: Leviola
- Species: L. termitophila

Binomial name
- Leviola termitophila Miller, 1970

Genus of spiders

Leviola is a genus of spiders in the family Zodariidae. It was first described in 1970 by Miller. As of 2017, it contains only one species, Leviola termitophila, found in Angola.
