= Caesetius inflatus =

Caesetius Zodariid spider

Conservation status
- Least Concern (SANBI Red List)

Scientific classification
- Kingdom: Animalia
- Phylum: Arthropoda
- Subphylum: Chelicerata
- Class: Arachnida
- Order: Araneae
- Infraorder: Araneomorphae
- Family: Zodariidae
- Genus: Caesetius
- Species: C. inflatus

Binomial name
- Caesetius inflatus Jocqué, 1991

Species of spider

Caesetius inflatus is a species of spider in the family Zodariidae. It occurs in southern and eastern Africa and is commonly known as the Caesetius Zodariid spider.

== Distribution ==
Caesetius inflatus occurs in Malawi, Mozambique, and South Africa. In South Africa, it has been recorded from three provinces: KwaZulu-Natal, Limpopo, and Mpumalanga, including localities in Kruger National Park, Ndumo Game Reserve, and Blouberg Nature Reserve.

== Habitat ==
The species inhabits the Savanna biome at altitudes ranging from 33 to 1148 m above sea level. It has a widespread distribution across its range.

== Description ==
Both males and females are known for this species. The carapace and chelicerae are dark chestnut brown with sparse recumbent silvery hairs. The sternum and legs are reddish-brown. The opisthosoma is dark grey and mottled with white, featuring a thin pale longitudinal median line and five thin chevrons in front of the spinnerets. The venter is pale with three ill-defined longitudinal dark bands.

== Ecology ==
Caesetius inflatus are free-living ground-dwellers.

== Conservation ==
The species is listed as Least Concern by the South African National Biodiversity Institute due to its wide geographical range. It is protected in Ndumo Game Reserve, uMkhuze Game Reserve, Blouberg Nature Reserve, and Kruger National Park.
