= Halidae =

Family of spiders

The Halidae were a tiny spider family with only three described species in two genera. As of 2006, this family was no longer considered valid; the two genera are instead grouped in the family Pisauridae.

== Distribution ==
This family is endemic to Madagascar.

== Species ==
Hala Jocqué, 1994

- Hala impigra Jocqué, 1994 (Madagascar)
- Hala paulyi Jocqué, 1994 (Madagascar)

Tolma Jocqué, 1994

- Tolma toreuta Jocqué, 1994 (Madagascar)
