= Suffasia mahasumana =

Scientific classification
- Kingdom: Animalia
- Phylum: Arthropoda
- Subphylum: Chelicerata
- Class: Arachnida
- Order: Araneae
- Infraorder: Araneomorphae
- Family: Zodariidae
- Genus: Suffasia
- Species: S. mahasumana

Binomial name
- Suffasia mahasumana Benjamin & Jocqué, 2000

Species of spider

Suffasia mahasumana, is a species of spider of the genus Suffasia. It is endemic to Sri Lanka. The species is known from both males and females, and is confined to cloud forests in the central highlands of Sri Lanka. Its description, alongside that of Suffasia attidiya, marked the first record of the genus Suffasia in Sri Lanka; other species in the genus were previously known only from southern India and Nepal. S. mahasumana is considered closely related to Suffasia tumegaster from Nepal.
