= Ballomma legala =

Scientific classification
- Kingdom: Animalia
- Phylum: Arthropoda
- Subphylum: Chelicerata
- Class: Arachnida
- Order: Araneae
- Infraorder: Araneomorphae
- Family: Zodariidae
- Genus: Ballomma
- Species: B. legala

Binomial name
- Ballomma legala Jocqué & Henrard, 2015

Species of spider

Ballomma legala is a species of spider in the family Zodariidae. It is endemic to South Africa.

== Distribution ==
Ballomma legala is endemic to the Limpopo province of South Africa, where it is known only from Lekgalameetse Nature Reserve.

== Habitat ==
The species inhabits the Savanna biome at an altitude of 857 metres above sea level. It occurs in mixed woodland environments where it has been sampled by sifting riverine litter.

== Description ==
Ballomma legala is known only from females. The species is easily recognized by the dense field of spinules on the distal part of the endites and the epigyne with a V-shaped mark in front of a transverse row of spermathecae. The cephalothorax is medium brown with a thin dark margin, and the opisthosoma has a complex pale pattern on a dark grey background.

== Ecology ==
Ballomma legala are free-living ground-dwellers that inhabit the leaf litter of mixed woodland environments. They are collected through litter sifting methods in riverine areas.

== Conservation ==
The species is listed as Data Deficient and is protected within Lekgalameetse Nature Reserve. More sampling is needed to collect males and determine the full extent of its distribution.
