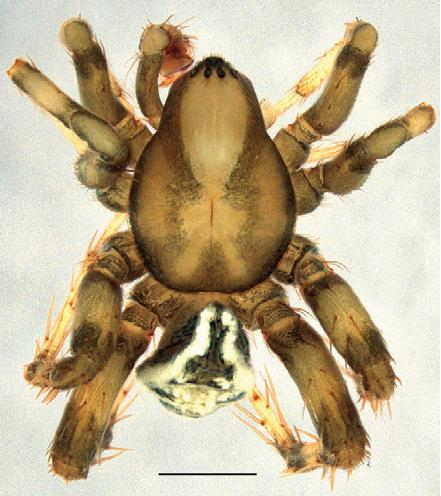
- A. normanlarseni

Scientific classification
- Kingdom: Animalia
- Phylum: Arthropoda
- Subphylum: Chelicerata
- Class: Arachnida
- Order: Araneae
- Infraorder: Araneomorphae
- Family: Zodariidae
- Genus: Australutica
- Species: A. normanlarseni

Binomial name
- Australutica normanlarseni Jocqué, 2008

= Australutica normanlarseni =

Species of spider

Australutica normanlarseni is a species of spider in the family Zodariidae. It is endemic to South Africa.

== Distribution ==
Australutica normanlarseni is endemic to the Western Cape province of South Africa, where it has been recorded from Kommetjie on the Cape Peninsula and Brenton-on-Sea.

== Habitat ==
The species inhabits the Fynbos biome at altitudes ranging from sea level to 124 metres above sea level. It is found in white sand dune environments along the coast.

== Description ==
Males of Australutica normanlarseni have a total length of 3.6 mm. The cephalothorax is pale yellow, strongly suffused with black on the sides. The opisthosoma is white on the dorsum with a dark pattern consisting of a frontal mark, two pairs of black spots, and a dark transverse stripe. Females remain undescribed.

== Ecology ==
Australutica normanlarseni are free-living ground-dwellers that inhabit coastal sand dune systems. The species status remains poorly understood due to limited sampling.

== Conservation ==
The species is listed as Data Deficient due to its obscure status and limited known range. It is potentially threatened by coastal housing development, and more sampling is needed to collect females and better understand its distribution.
