= Procydrela procursor =

Sedgefield Procydrela zodariid spider

Conservation status
- Endangered (SANBI Red List)

Scientific classification
- Kingdom: Animalia
- Phylum: Arthropoda
- Subphylum: Chelicerata
- Class: Arachnida
- Order: Araneae
- Infraorder: Araneomorphae
- Family: Zodariidae
- Genus: Procydrela
- Species: P. procursor

Binomial name
- Procydrela procursor Jocqué, 1999

Species of spider

Procydrela procursor is a species of spider in the family Zodariidae. It is endemic to South Africa and is commonly known as the Sedgefield Procydrela zodariid spider.

== Distribution ==
Procydrela procursor is found in the Western Cape and Eastern Cape provinces. Known localities include Sedgefield, De Hoop Nature Reserve, Brenton-on-Sea in the Western Cape, and Baviaanskloof Nature Reserve in the Eastern Cape.

== Habitat ==
The species are ground-dwelling spiders inhabiting the Fynbos biome at altitudes ranging from 15 to 62 m above sea level.

== Description ==
Both males and females of Procydrela procursor are known. Males have a total length of 5.54 mm with brownish orange carapace and chelicerae, slightly paler in the cephalic area. The opisthosoma displays a complex dark pattern of spots and chevrons on a pale background. Females reach 6.35 mm in total length and have similar coloration to males but lack the pale orange scutum present in males.

== Conservation ==
The species is listed as Endangered by the South African National Biodiversity Institute. It is protected in De Hoop Nature Reserve and Baviaanskloof Nature Reserve.
