= Rotundrela orbiculata =

Scientific classification
- Kingdom: Animalia
- Phylum: Arthropoda
- Subphylum: Chelicerata
- Class: Arachnida
- Order: Araneae
- Infraorder: Araneomorphae
- Family: Zodariidae
- Genus: Rotundrela
- Species: R. orbiculata

Binomial name
- Rotundrela orbiculata Jocqué, 1999

Species of spider

Rotundrela orbiculata is a species of spider in the family Zodariidae. It is endemic to the Western Cape province of South Africa.

== Distribution ==
Rotundrela orbiculata is found in the Cederberg region of the Western Cape, with records from Cederberg Wilderness Area, Clanwilliam, and Pakhuis Pass.

== Habitat ==
The species inhabits the Fynbos biome at altitudes ranging from 78 to 1,530 m above sea level.

== Description ==
Both sexes of Rotundrela orbiculata are known. Males have a total length of 5.40 mm with a reddish brown carapace and orange chelicerae. The abdomen displays a pale pattern on a dark background with distinctive kidney-shaped patches and rounded spots. Females reach 6.24 mm in total length with an orange carapace and sternum that have dark rims.

== Ecology ==
Rotundrela orbiculata are free-running ground-dwelling spiders that are collected from litter and occasionally with pitfall traps.

== Conservation ==
The species is considered Rare due to its small restricted distribution range. It receives protection in the Cederberg Wilderness Area.
