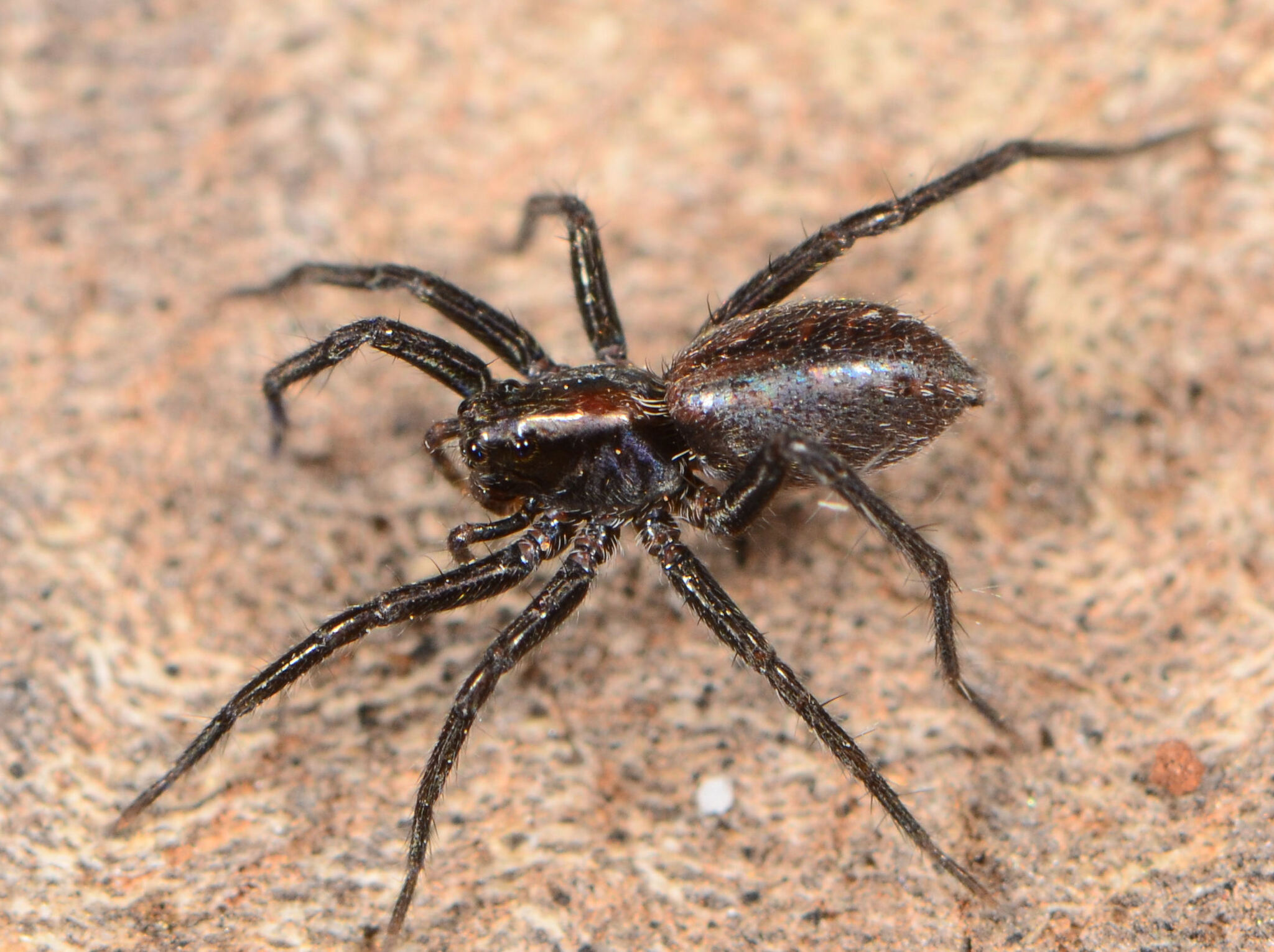
- female
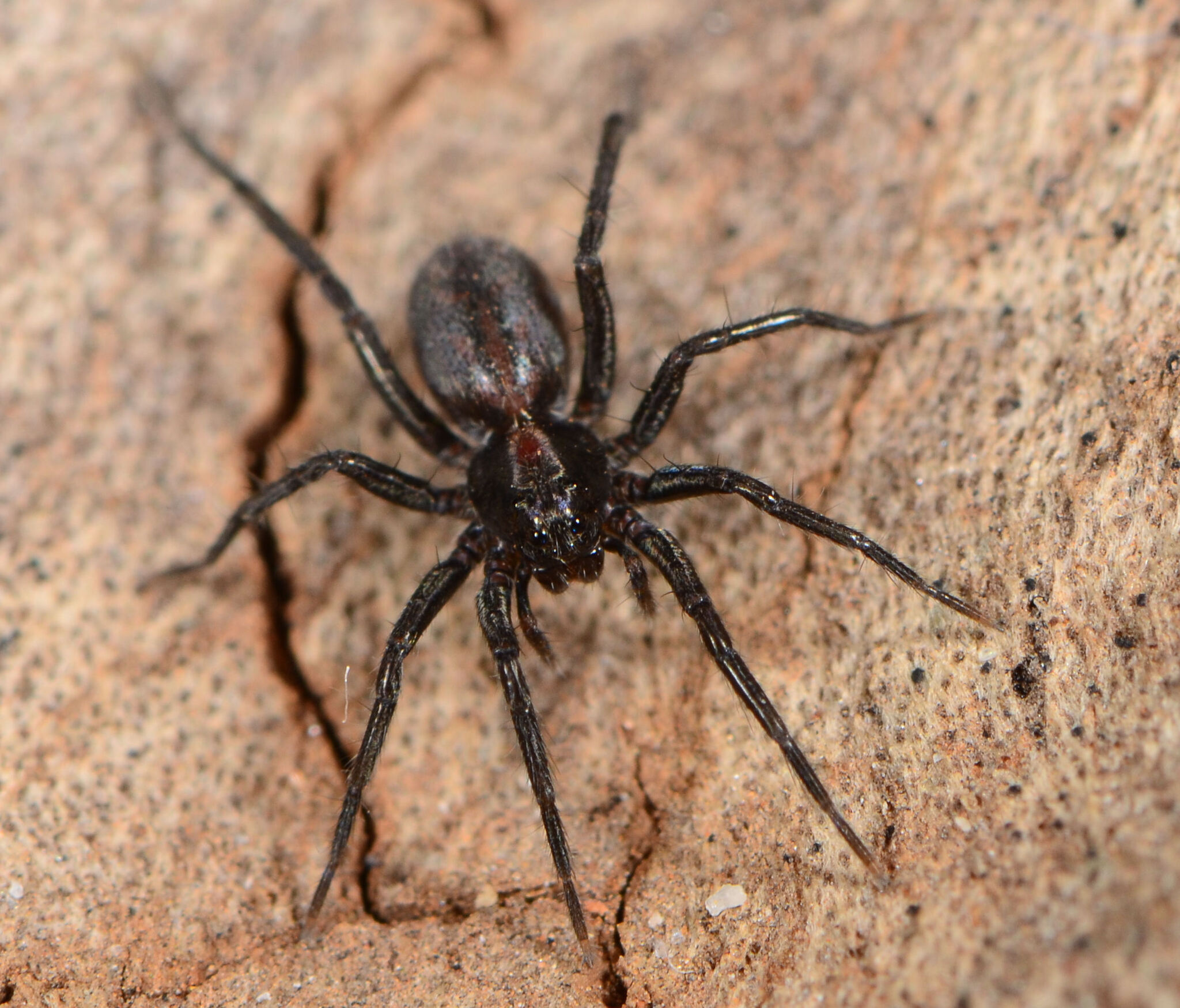
- female

Scientific classification
- Kingdom: Animalia
- Phylum: Arthropoda
- Subphylum: Chelicerata
- Class: Arachnida
- Order: Araneae
- Infraorder: Araneomorphae
- Family: Lycosidae
- Genus: Foveosa
- Species: F. adunca

Binomial name
- Foveosa adunca Russell-Smith, Alderweireldt & Jocqué, 2007

= Foveosa adunca =

Merrievale Foveosa Wolf Spider

Species of spider

Foveosa adunca is a species of spider in the family Lycosidae. It is endemic to South Africa and is commonly known as the Merrievale Foveosa wolf spider.

== Distribution ==
Foveosa adunca is known from three provinces in South Africa.

== Habitat ==
The species is a free-running ground dweller sampled from the Grassland and Savanna biomes at elevations ranging from 1080 to 1647 m.

== Conservation ==
Foveosa adunca is listed as Least Concern by the South African National Biodiversity Institute due to its wide geographical range. The species is protected in Qwa Qwa Nature Reserve, Tussen die Riviere Nature Reserve, Erfenisdam Nature Reserve, Marievale Nature Reserve, Suikerbosrand Nature Reserve, and Ezemvelo Nature Reserve.

== Taxonomy ==
The species was described by Russell-Smith, Alderweireldt, and Jocqué in 2007 from Marievale Nature Reserve Bird Sanctuary in Gauteng.
