= Ballomma neethlingi =

Scientific classification
- Kingdom: Animalia
- Phylum: Arthropoda
- Subphylum: Chelicerata
- Class: Arachnida
- Order: Araneae
- Infraorder: Araneomorphae
- Family: Zodariidae
- Genus: Ballomma
- Species: B. neethlingi

Binomial name
- Ballomma neethlingi Jocqué & Henrard, 2015

Species of spider

Ballomma neethlingi is a species of spider in the family Zodariidae. It is endemic to South Africa.

== Distribution ==
Ballomma neethlingi is endemic to the Limpopo province of South Africa, where it has been recorded from Medikwe Heritage Site and Haenertsburg.

== Habitat ==
The species inhabits the Savanna biome at altitudes ranging from 798 to 1,399 metres above sea level. It occurs in montane bushveld environments where it has been sampled by sifting litter.

== Description ==
Ballomma neethlingi is known from both sexes. Males are easily recognized by the field of spines in front of the epigastric fold and the pedipalp with a retrolateral patellar swelling and a broad triangular transparent retrolateral tibial apophysis. The cephalothorax, sternum, and chelicerae are medium brown, while the legs are pale yellowish-brown. The opisthosoma is pale with a complex dark pattern on the dorsum and four dark apodemes.

Females have a characteristic epigyne in which the internal structures visible through transparency form an X-shape. This distinctive feature helps distinguish the species from other members of the genus.

== Ecology ==
Ballomma neethlingi are free-living ground-dwellers that inhabit the leaf litter of montane bushveld environments. They are primarily collected through litter sifting methods.

== Conservation ==
The species is listed as Data Deficient due to its limited known distribution and undersampling. It is known from only two sites and more sampling is needed to determine the full extent of its range.
