= Ballomma =

Scientific classification
- Kingdom: Animalia
- Phylum: Arthropoda
- Subphylum: Chelicerata
- Class: Arachnida
- Order: Araneae
- Infraorder: Araneomorphae
- Family: Zodariidae
- Genus: Ballomma; Jocqué & Henrard

Type species
- Ballomma erasmus

Species
- see text

Genus of spiders

Ballomma is a genus of spiders in the family Zodariidae endemic to South Africa with four described species. It was first described in 2015 by Jocqué & Henrard.

== Species ==
As of September 2025, this genus includes four species, all endemic to South Africa:

- Ballomma erasmus Jocqué & Henrard, 2015 (type species)
- Ballomma haddadi Jocqué & Henrard, 2015
- Ballomma legala Jocqué & Henrard, 2015
- Ballomma neethlingi Jocqué & Henrard, 2015
