= Rotundrela rotunda =

Muizenberg Rotundrela zodariid spider

Scientific classification
- Kingdom: Animalia
- Phylum: Arthropoda
- Subphylum: Chelicerata
- Class: Arachnida
- Order: Araneae
- Infraorder: Araneomorphae
- Family: Zodariidae
- Genus: Rotundrela
- Species: R. rotunda

Binomial name
- Rotundrela rotunda Jocqué, 1999

Species of spider

Rotundrela rotunda is a species of spider in the family Zodariidae. It is endemic to the Western Cape province of South Africa and is commonly known as the Muizenberg Rotundrela zodariid spider.

== Distribution ==
Rotundrela rotunda is found on the Cape Peninsula and nearby areas, with records from Muizenberg, De Hoop Nature Reserve, Bergvliet, Stellenbosch, and Table Mountain National Park.

== Habitat ==
The species inhabits the Fynbos biome at altitudes ranging from 6 to 225 m above sea level. At Muizenberg, it has been collected from dune habitats.

== Description ==
Rotundrela rotunda exhibits sexual dimorphism in size. Males have a total length of 5.54 mm with a dark brown carapace bearing a black rim. The abdomen displays a pale pattern on a dark background with distinctive pink sigilla. Females are larger at 7.17 mm total length with similar coloration to males.

== Ecology ==
Rotundrela rotunda are free-living ground-dwelling spiders that inhabit coastal dune systems and fynbos vegetation.

== Conservation ==
The species is listed as Endangered by the South African National Biodiversity Institute due to its small restricted distribution range. It is protected in De Hoop Nature Reserve and Table Mountain National Park.
