= Procydrela limacola =

Scientific classification
- Kingdom: Animalia
- Phylum: Arthropoda
- Subphylum: Chelicerata
- Class: Arachnida
- Order: Araneae
- Infraorder: Araneomorphae
- Family: Zodariidae
- Genus: Procydrela
- Species: P. limacola

Binomial name
- Procydrela limacola Jocqué, 1999

Species of spider

Procydrela limacola is a species of spider in the family Zodariidae. It is endemic to the Western Cape province of South Africa.

== Distribution ==
Procydrela limacola is known from two localities in the Western Cape: Kogsman's Kloof near Montagu and Bontebok National Park.

== Habitat ==
The species inhabits the Fynbos biome at altitudes ranging from 63 to 718 m above sea level.

== Description ==
Procydrela limacola is known only from females, which have a total length of 6.39 mm. The carapace and abdominal dorsum are finely haired. The chelicerae are smooth and densely haired, with two teeth on the promargin. The holotype specimen is entirely pale and hardly sclerotized.

== Ecology ==
Procydrela limacola are ground-dwelling spiders that inhabit the Fynbos biome.

== Conservation ==
The species is listed as Data Deficient by the IUCN. Despite being a Western Cape endemic with a restricted distribution, more sampling is needed to collect males and determine the species' full range. The species is protected in Bontebok National Park.
