= Ballomma erasmus =

Scientific classification
- Kingdom: Animalia
- Phylum: Arthropoda
- Subphylum: Chelicerata
- Class: Arachnida
- Order: Araneae
- Infraorder: Araneomorphae
- Family: Zodariidae
- Genus: Ballomma
- Species: B. erasmus

Binomial name
- Ballomma erasmus Jocqué & Henrard, 2015

Species of spider

Ballomma erasmus is a species of spider in the family Zodariidae. It is endemic to South Africa.

== Distribution ==
Ballomma erasmus is endemic to the Limpopo province of South Africa, where it is known only from the type locality at Ga-Moraba, Abel Erasmus Pass.

== Habitat ==
The species inhabits the Savanna biome at an altitude of 882 metres above sea level. It occurs in forest areas where it has been sampled by sifting litter.

== Description ==
Ballomma erasmus is known from both sexes. Males have a medium brown cephalothorax and pale yellowish-brown legs with a greenish tinge on the femora. The abdomen has a complex dark pattern on a pale background. Females have a medium brown cephalothorax with a dark margin and a dark sepia opisthosoma with a complex pale pattern.

== Ecology ==
Ballomma erasmus are free-living ground-dwellers that inhabit the leaf litter of forest environments. They are primarily collected through litter sifting methods.

== Conservation ==
The species is listed as Data Deficient due to its limited known range and obscure status. It is known only from the type locality, and more sampling is needed to determine its full distribution.
