= Akyttara homunculus =

Akyttara Zodariid spider

Conservation status
- Least Concern (SANBI Red List)

Scientific classification
- Kingdom: Animalia
- Phylum: Arthropoda
- Subphylum: Chelicerata
- Class: Arachnida
- Order: Araneae
- Infraorder: Araneomorphae
- Family: Zodariidae
- Genus: Akyttara
- Species: A. homunculus

Binomial name
- Akyttara homunculus Jocqué, 1991

Species of spider

Akyttara homunculus is a species of spider in the family Zodariidae. It is endemic to southern Africa and is commonly known as the Akyttara Zodariid spider.

== Distribution ==
Akyttara homunculus occurs in Botswana and South Africa. Within South Africa, the species has been recorded from the Limpopo, Northern Cape, and Western Cape provinces. Notable localities include Kruger National Park, Namaqua National Park, Richtersveld National Park, and Tankwa Karoo National Park.

== Habitat ==
The species inhabits the Savanna and Succulent Karoo biomes at altitudes ranging from 40 to 1,336 metres above sea level. Akyttara homunculus is typically found in leaf litter and beneath rocks and logs in arid environments.

== Description ==
Akyttara homunculus is a small spider with females measuring little more than 2 mm in total length. Both sexes are yellow-brown in colour and superficially resemble Heradida species. The female is characterized by large anterior median eyes, a distinctive abdominal pattern, and the presence of a stridulating organ between the opisthosoma and cephalothorax.

== Ecology ==
Akyttara homunculus are free-living ground-dwellers that mimic small epigeic ants, which constitute their primary prey. They are frequently collected using pitfall traps and are found under logs in savanna areas and beneath rocks in the Succulent Karoo.

== Conservation ==
The species is listed as Least Concern by the South African National Biodiversity Institute due to its wide geographical range across southern Africa. There are no significant threats identified for this species.
