= Ballomma haddadi =

Haddad's Ballomma Zodariid spider

Scientific classification
- Kingdom: Animalia
- Phylum: Arthropoda
- Subphylum: Chelicerata
- Class: Arachnida
- Order: Araneae
- Infraorder: Araneomorphae
- Family: Zodariidae
- Genus: Ballomma
- Species: B. haddadi

Binomial name
- Ballomma haddadi Jocqué & Henrard, 2015

Species of spider

Ballomma haddadi is a species of spider in the family Zodariidae. It is endemic to South Africa and is commonly known as Haddad's Ballomma Zodariid spider.

== Etymology ==
The species is named after Charles R. Haddad, a prominent South African arachnologist.

== Distribution ==
Ballomma haddadi occurs in Limpopo and Mpumalanga provinces of South Africa. It has been recorded from Woodbush Forest near Polokwane, Kaingo Game Reserve in the Waterberg, and Ohrigstad.

== Habitat ==
The species inhabits the Savanna biome at altitudes ranging from 860 to 1,080 metres above sea level. It occurs in forest environments where it has been sampled by sifting litter.

== Description ==
Ballomma haddadi is known from both sexes. Males are easily recognized by their distinctive pedipalp with a long, thin, sinuous embolus that has a large, sharp process at its base. The cephalothorax is medium brown, and the abdomen is grey with a complex pale pattern. Females have a characteristic epigyne with a dark central area and well-separated spermathecae.

== Ecology ==
Ballomma haddadi are free-living ground-dwellers that inhabit the leaf litter of forest environments. They are collected through litter sifting methods.

== Conservation ==
The species is listed as data deficient due to its obscure status. More sampling is needed to determine the full extent of its distribution range.
