= Venia =

Scientific classification
- Kingdom: Animalia
- Phylum: Arthropoda
- Subphylum: Chelicerata
- Class: Arachnida
- Order: Araneae
- Infraorder: Araneomorphae
- Family: Linyphiidae
- Genus: Venia; Seyfulina & Jocqué, 2009
- Species: V. kakamega

Binomial name
- Venia kakamega Seyfulina & Jocqué, 2009

Genus of spiders

Venia is a monotypic genus of Kenyan sheet weavers containing the single species, Venia kakamega. It was first described by R. R. Seyfulina & R. Jocqué in 2009, and is only found in Kenya.
