= Psammoduon canosum =

Namaqualand Psammoduon zodariid spider

Conservation status
- Least Concern (SANBI Red List)

Scientific classification
- Kingdom: Animalia
- Phylum: Arthropoda
- Subphylum: Chelicerata
- Class: Arachnida
- Order: Araneae
- Infraorder: Araneomorphae
- Family: Zodariidae
- Genus: Psammoduon
- Species: P. canosum

Binomial name
- Psammoduon canosum (Simon, 1910)

Synonyms
- Caesetius canosus Simon, 1910

Species of spider

Psammoduon canosum is a species of spider in the family Zodariidae. It is found in Namibia and South Africa and is commonly known as the Namaqualand Psammoduon zodariid spider.

== Distribution ==
Psammoduon canosum occurs in southern Africa, with records from South Africa (Northern Cape and Western Cape provinces) and Namibia.

== Habitat ==
The species inhabits the Desert, Fynbos, and Succulent Karoo biomes at altitudes ranging from 14 to 357 m above sea level.

== Description ==
Both sexes of Psammoduon canosum are known. Males reach 8.47 mm in total length with a medium brown carapace that is slightly paler in the middle and in front of the fovea. Females measure 7.75 mm in total length with similar coloration to males. The abdomen is pale cream with faint darker patches.

== Ecology ==
Psammoduon canosum are ground-dwelling spiders capable of diving into loose sand and creating burrows. They inhabit multiple biomes including desert and semi-arid regions.

== Conservation ==
The species is listed as Least Concern by the South African National Biodiversity Institute due to its wide geographical range. It is protected in multiple reserves including Witsand Nature Reserve, Richtersveld Transfrontier National Park, and Bontebok National Park.
