= Deelemania =

Scientific classification
- Kingdom: Animalia
- Phylum: Arthropoda
- Subphylum: Chelicerata
- Class: Arachnida
- Order: Araneae
- Infraorder: Araneomorphae
- Family: Linyphiidae
- Genus: Deelemania; Jocqué & Bosmans, 1983

Type species
- D. manensis Jocqué & Bosmans, 1983

Species
- 4, see text

Genus of spiders

Deelemania is a genus of African dwarf spiders that was first described by R. Jocqué & R. Bosmans in 1983.

== Species ==
As of May 2019 it contains four species:

- Deelemania gabonensis Jocqué, 1983 – Gabon
- Deelemania malawiensis Jocqué & Russell-Smith, 1984 – Malawi
- Deelemania manensis Jocqué & Bosmans, 1983 (type) – Ivory Coast
- Deelemania nasuta Bosmans, 1988 – Cameroon
