= Storosa =

Scientific classification
- Kingdom: Animalia
- Phylum: Arthropoda
- Subphylum: Chelicerata
- Class: Arachnida
- Order: Araneae
- Infraorder: Araneomorphae
- Family: Zodariidae
- Genus: Storosa; Jocqué, 1991

Type species
- S. obscura Jocqué, 1991

Species
- S. obscura Jocqué, 1991 — Australia (Queensland, New South Wales); S. tetrica (Simon, 1908) — Australia (Western Australia)

Genus of spiders

Storosa is a genus of Australian ant spiders first described by Rudy Jocqué in 1991. As of April 2019 it contains only two species. S. obscura is a fast running spider found on the ground between litter. It can grow up to 13 millimetres (0.51 in) long and waves its front legs if threatened.
