= Koinothrix =

Scientific classification
- Kingdom: Animalia
- Phylum: Arthropoda
- Subphylum: Chelicerata
- Class: Arachnida
- Order: Araneae
- Infraorder: Araneomorphae
- Family: Linyphiidae
- Genus: Koinothrix; Jocqué, 1981
- Species: K. pequenops

Binomial name
- Koinothrix pequenops Jocqué, 1981

Genus of spiders

Koinothrix is a monotypic genus of West African dwarf spiders that contains a single species:Koinothrix pequenops. This species was first described by R. Jocqué in 1981, and has only been found in Cabo Verde.
