= Neoeburnella =

Scientific classification
- Kingdom: Animalia
- Phylum: Arthropoda
- Subphylum: Chelicerata
- Class: Arachnida
- Order: Araneae
- Infraorder: Araneomorphae
- Family: Linyphiidae
- Genus: Neoeburnella; Koçak, 1986
- Species: N. avocalis

Binomial name
- Neoeburnella avocalis (Jocqué & Bosmans, 1983)

Genus of spiders

Neoeburnella is a monotypic genus of West African dwarf spiders containing the single species, Neoeburnella avocalis. It was first described by A. Ö. Koçak in 1986, and has only been found in Côte d'Ivoire.
