= Psammoduon arenicola =

Cape Psammoduon zodariid spider

Conservation status
- Vulnerable (SANBI Red List)

Scientific classification
- Kingdom: Animalia
- Phylum: Arthropoda
- Subphylum: Chelicerata
- Class: Arachnida
- Order: Araneae
- Infraorder: Araneomorphae
- Family: Zodariidae
- Genus: Psammoduon
- Species: P. arenicola

Binomial name
- Psammoduon arenicola (Simon, 1910)

Synonyms
- Caesetius arenicola Simon, 1910

Species of spider

Psammoduon arenicola is a species of spider in the family Zodariidae. It is endemic to the Western Cape province of South Africa and is commonly known as the Cape Psammoduon zodariid spider.

== Distribution ==
Psammoduon arenicola is found in the Western Cape, primarily on the Cape Peninsula. Known localities include Hout Bay, Kleinmond, Kommetjie, Mamre, Muizenberg, Simonstown, Robben Island, Cederberg Wilderness Area, and Yzerfontein.

== Habitat ==
The species inhabits the Fynbos biome at altitudes ranging from 6 to 479 m above sea level.

== Description ==
Psammoduon arenicola exhibits sexual dimorphism in size. Females reach 8.66 mm in total length with a medium brown carapace bearing two broad lateral bands and a narrow black margin. The abdomen displays an intricate dorsal pattern of black, white and brown hairs. Males are smaller at 6.5 mm total length with a dark reddish brown carapace and slightly paler median band.

== Ecology ==
Psammoduon arenicola are ground-dwelling spiders capable of diving into loose sand. They inhabit sandy areas within the Fynbos biome.

== Conservation ==
The species is listed as Vulnerable by the South African National Biodiversity Institute due to its small distribution range. It receives protection in the Cederberg Wilderness Area.
