= Suffasia attidiya =

Scientific classification
- Kingdom: Animalia
- Phylum: Arthropoda
- Subphylum: Chelicerata
- Class: Arachnida
- Order: Araneae
- Infraorder: Araneomorphae
- Family: Zodariidae
- Genus: Suffasia
- Species: S. attidiya

Binomial name
- Suffasia attidiya Benjamin & Jocqué, 2000

Species of spider

Suffasia attidiya, is a species of spider of the genus Suffasia. It is endemic to Sri Lanka. The species was documented only from female specimens found from Bellanwila-Attidiya marsh, situated on the south-eastern outskirts of Colombo. The first male specimen was found in 2005.
