= Suffasia =

Scientific classification
- Kingdom: Animalia
- Phylum: Arthropoda
- Subphylum: Chelicerata
- Class: Arachnida
- Order: Araneae
- Infraorder: Araneomorphae
- Family: Zodariidae
- Genus: Suffasia; Jocqué, 1991

Type species
- Suffasia tigrina (L. Koch, 1875)

Species
- See text

Diversity
- 8 species

Genus of spiders

Suffasia is a genus of ant spiders in the family Zodariidae, containing eight species restricted to India, Nepal, and Sri Lanka.

== Species ==
- Suffasia ala (Simon, 1893) — India
- Suffasia attidiya Benjamin & Jocqué, 2000 — Sri Lanka
- Suffasia kanchenjunga Ono, 2006 — Nepal
- Suffasia keralaensis Sudhikumar, Jocqué & Sebastian, 2009 — India
- Suffasia mahasumana Benjamin & Jocqué, 2000 — Sri Lanka
- Suffasia martensi Ono, 2006 — Nepal
- Suffasia tigrina (Simon, 1893) — India
- Suffasia tumegaster Jocqué, 1992 — Nepal
