= Holmelgonia =

Scientific classification
- Kingdom: Animalia
- Phylum: Arthropoda
- Subphylum: Chelicerata
- Class: Arachnida
- Order: Araneae
- Infraorder: Araneomorphae
- Family: Linyphiidae
- Genus: Holmelgonia; Jocqué & Scharff, 2007

Type species
- H. nemoralis (Holm, 1962)

Species
- 17, see text

Genus of spiders

Holmelgonia is a genus of African dwarf spiders that was first described by R. Jocqué & N. Scharff in 2007.

== Species ==
As of May 2019 it contains seventeen species, found in Angola, Burundi, Cameroon, Middle Africa, Kenya, Malawi, Tanzania, and Uganda:

- Holmelgonia afromontana Nzigidahera & Jocqué, 2014 – Burundi
- Holmelgonia annemetteae (Scharff, 1990) – Tanzania
- Holmelgonia annulata (Jocqué & Scharff, 1986) – Tanzania
- Holmelgonia basalis (Jocqué & Scharff, 1986) – Tanzania
- Holmelgonia bosnasutus Nzigidahera & Jocqué, 2014 – Burundi
- Holmelgonia brachystegiae (Jocqué, 1981) – Malawi
- Holmelgonia disconveniens Nzigidahera & Jocqué, 2014 – Burundi
- Holmelgonia falciformis (Scharff, 1990) – Tanzania
- Holmelgonia hirsuta (Miller, 1970) – Angola
- Holmelgonia holmi (Miller, 1970) – Cameroon, Congo
- Holmelgonia limpida (Miller, 1970) – Angola
- Holmelgonia nemoralis (Holm, 1962) (type) – Congo, Uganda, Kenya
- Holmelgonia perturbatrix (Jocqué & Scharff, 1986) – Tanzania
- Holmelgonia producta (Bosmans, 1988) – Cameroon
- Holmelgonia projecta (Jocqué & Scharff, 1986) – Tanzania
- Holmelgonia rungwensis (Jocqué & Scharff, 1986) – Tanzania
- Holmelgonia stoltzei (Jocqué & Scharff, 1986) – Tanzania
