= Comorella =

Scientific classification
- Kingdom: Animalia
- Phylum: Arthropoda
- Subphylum: Chelicerata
- Class: Arachnida
- Order: Araneae
- Infraorder: Araneomorphae
- Family: Linyphiidae
- Genus: Comorella; Jocqué, 1985
- Species: C. spectabilis

Binomial name
- Comorella spectabilis Jocqué, 1985

Genus of spiders

Comorella is a monotypic genus of East African dwarf spiders containing the single species, Comorella spectabilis. It was first described by R. Jocqué in 1985, and has only been found in Comoros.
