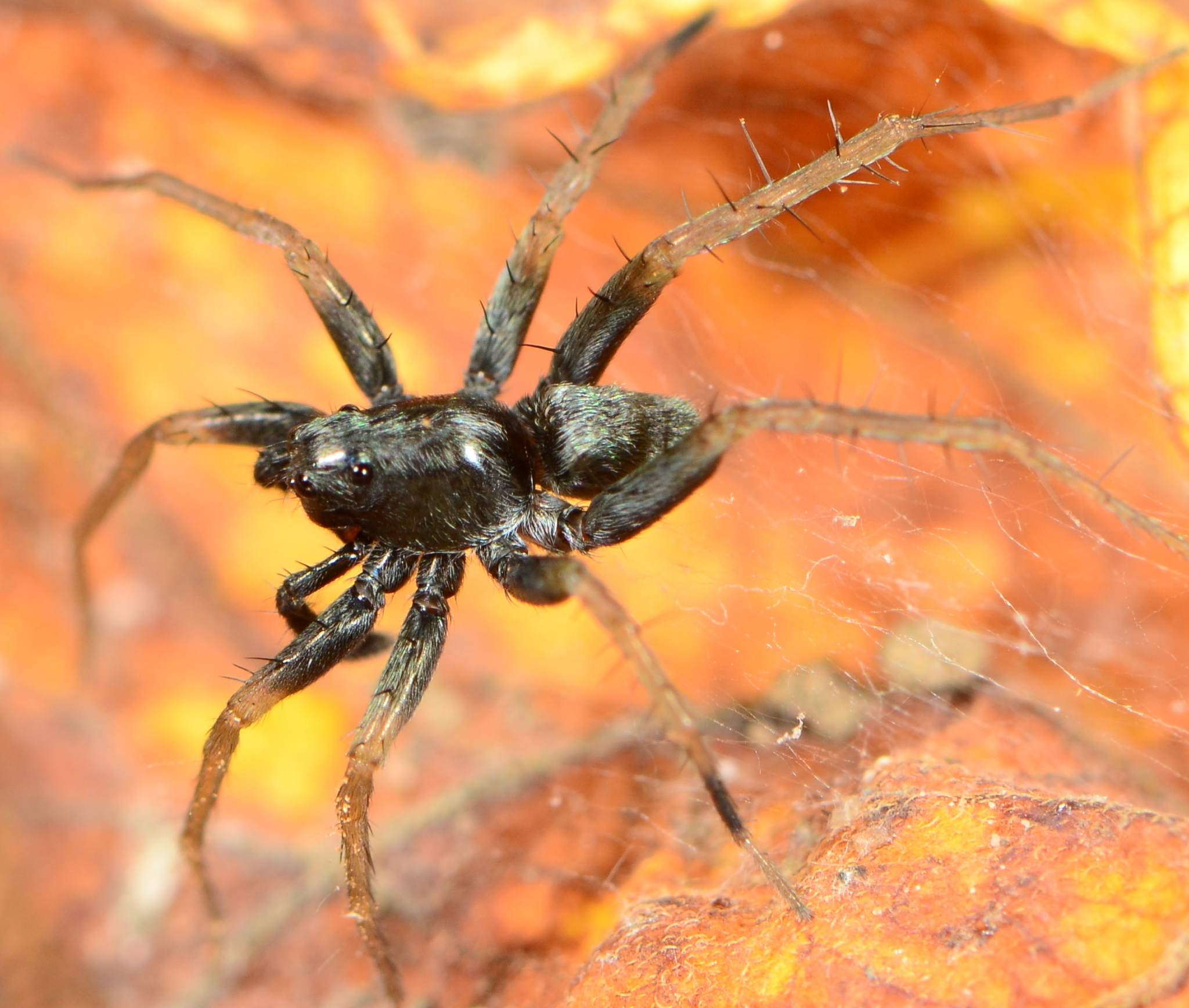
- male
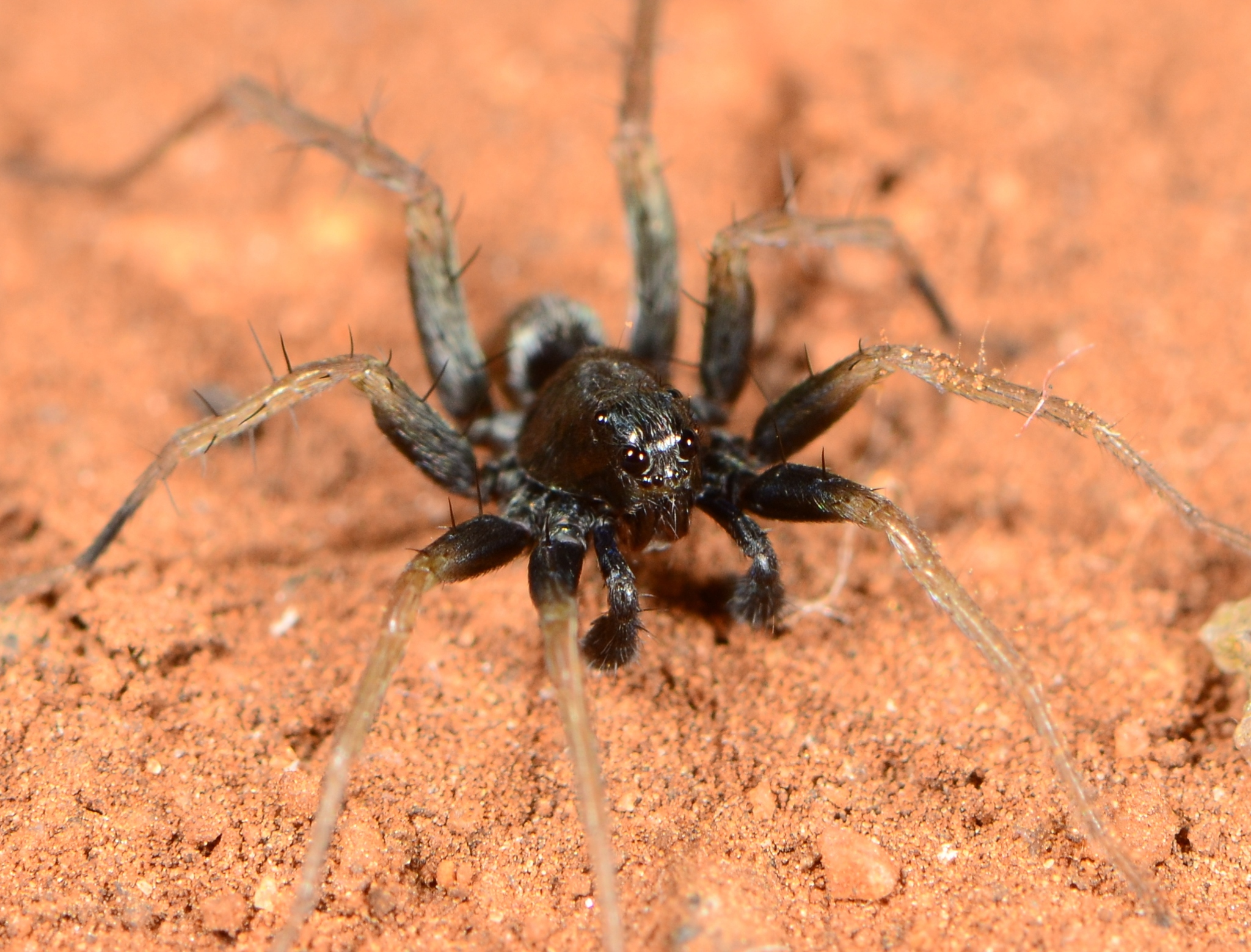
- male

Scientific classification
- Kingdom: Animalia
- Phylum: Arthropoda
- Subphylum: Chelicerata
- Class: Arachnida
- Order: Araneae
- Infraorder: Araneomorphae
- Family: Lycosidae
- Genus: Foveosa
- Species: F. foveolata

Binomial name
- Foveosa foveolata (Purcell, 1903)

Synonyms
- Pardosa foveolata Purcell, 1903; Lycosa houssa Strand, 1913; Pardosa houssabeni Roewer, 1955

= Foveosa foveolata =

Pale Tip Leg Foveosa Wolf Spider

Species of spider

Foveosa foveolata is a species of spider in the family Lycosidae. It occurs in Central, East, and Southern Africa and is commonly known as the pale tip leg Foveosa wolf spider.

== Distribution ==
Foveosa foveolata has a wide distribution throughout Central, East, and Southern Africa. It is found from South Africa to Ethiopia in the northeast and Equatorial Guinea in the west. In South Africa, the species is known from seven provinces at elevations ranging from 5 to 2985 m, including more than ten protected areas.

== Habitat ==
The species occurs in a wide range of different natural and human-modified habitats. It is a free-running ground dweller sampled from the Fynbos, Grassland, Thicket, and Savanna biomes. It has also been sampled from crops such as citrus and pistachio orchards.

== Description ==
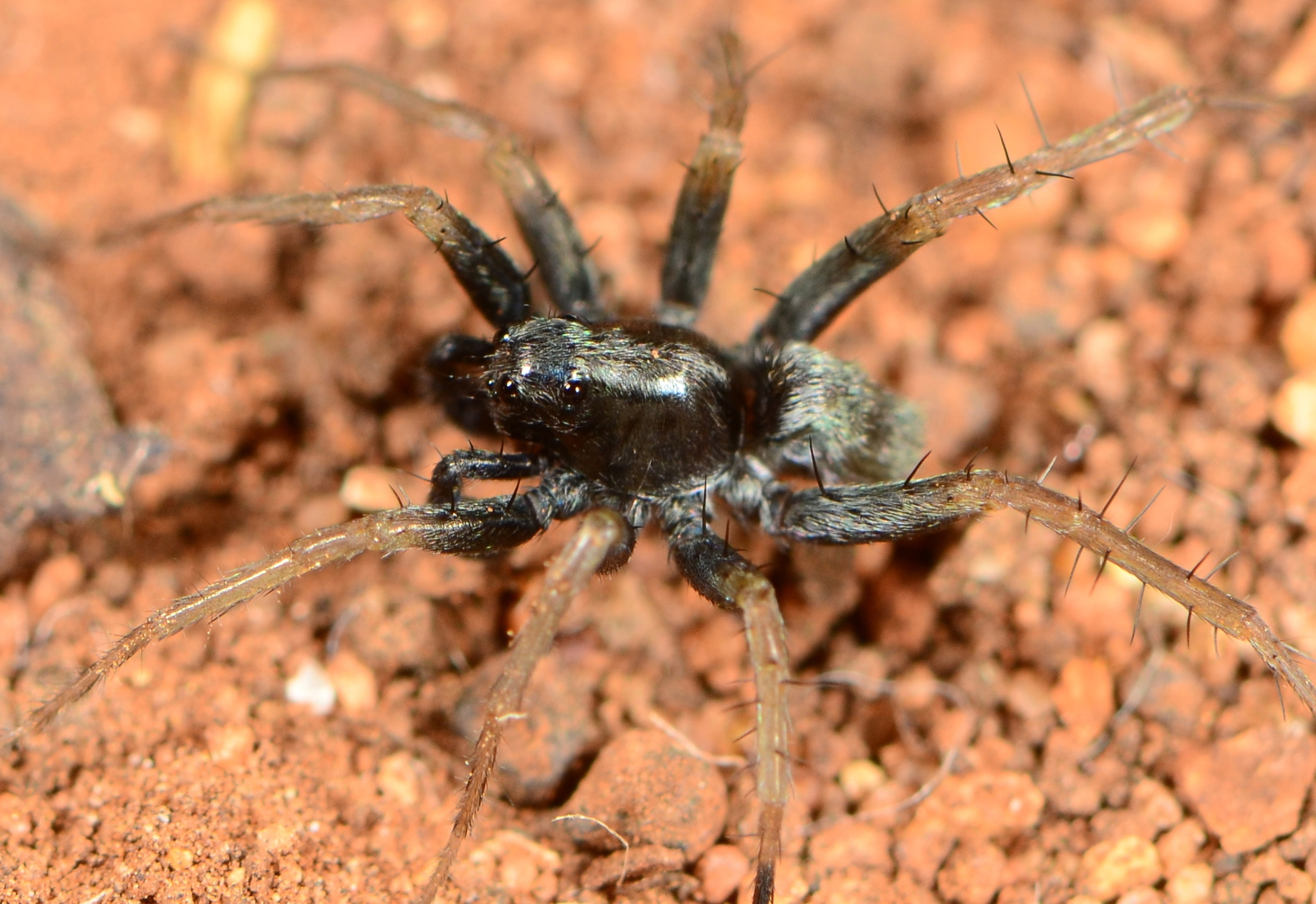
male

== Conservation ==
Foveosa foveolata is listed as Least Concern by the South African National Biodiversity Institute due to its wide geographical range. The species is known from more than ten protected areas in South Africa.

== Taxonomy ==
The species was originally described by William Frederick Purcell in 1903 as Pardosa foveolata from Port St. Johns in South Africa.
