= Rotundrela =

Scientific classification
- Kingdom: Animalia
- Phylum: Arthropoda
- Subphylum: Chelicerata
- Class: Arachnida
- Order: Araneae
- Infraorder: Araneomorphae
- Family: Zodariidae
- Genus: Rotundrela; Jocqué

Type species
- Rotundrela rotunda

Species
- see text

Genus of spiders

Rotundrela is a genus of spiders in the family Zodariidae. It was first described in 1999 by Jocqué. It contains 2 species, both from South Africa.

== Species ==
As of September 2025, the genus contains two species, both from South Africa:

- Rotundrela orbiculata Jocqué, 1999
- Rotundrela rotunda Jocqué, 1999
