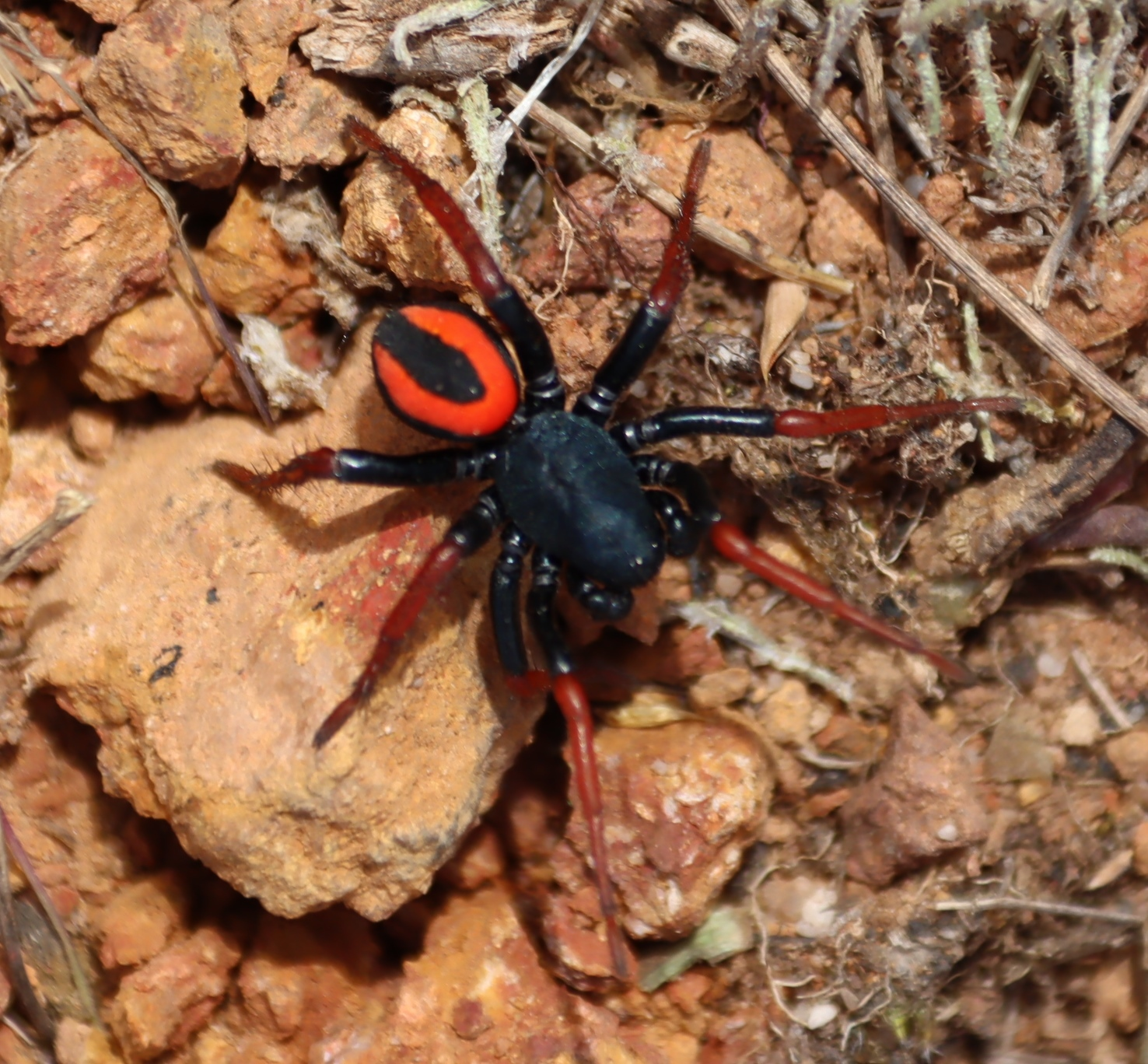

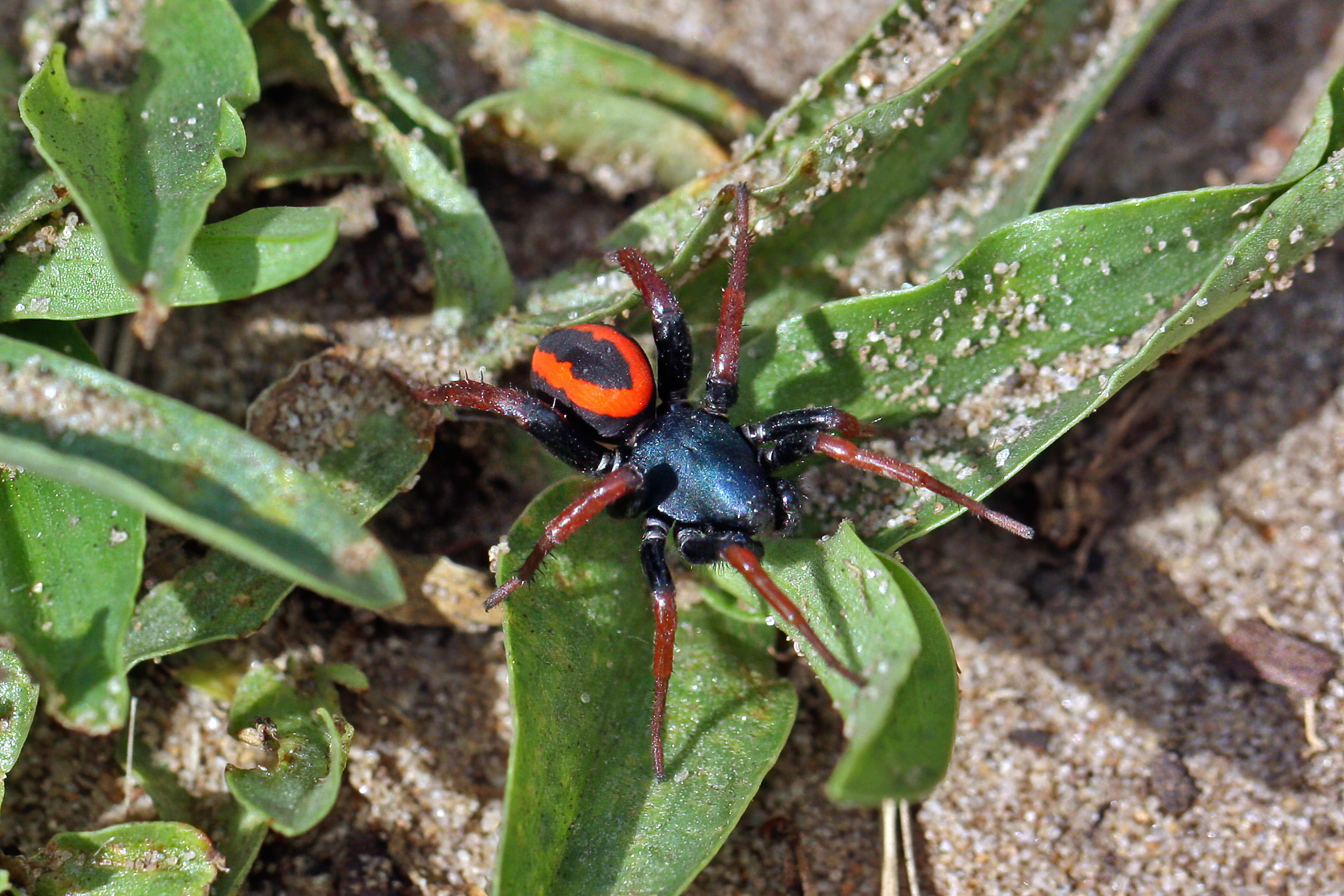

Scientific classification
- Kingdom: Animalia
- Phylum: Arthropoda
- Subphylum: Chelicerata
- Class: Arachnida
- Order: Araneae
- Infraorder: Araneomorphae
- Family: Zodariidae
- Genus: Psammorygma
- Species: P. aculeatum

Binomial name
- Psammorygma aculeatum (Karsch, 1878)

Synonyms
- Tristichops aculeatus Karsch, 1878; Cydrela aculeata Simon, 1893; Psammorygma aculeata Jocqué, 1991

= Psammorygma aculeatum =

Zululand Psammorygma zodariid spider

Species of spider

Psammorygma aculeatum is a species of spider in the family Zodariidae. It is endemic to South Africa and is commonly known as the Zululand Psammorygma zodariid spider.

== Distribution ==
Psammorygma aculeatum is found in the South African provinces KwaZulu-Natal, Limpopo, and Mpumalanga, with an uncertain record from the Western Cape.

== Habitat ==
The species inhabits the Indian Ocean Coastal Belt and Savanna biomes at altitudes ranging from 6 to 1,909 m above sea level.

== Description ==
Psammorygma aculeatum is known only from females. According to the original description, the abdomen is decorated with a crescent-shaped spot of light color, sometimes yellowish to white. The legs and pedipalps are black, with only the tarsi being dark brown to almost black.

== Ecology ==
Psammorygma aculeatum are burrowing spiders, but little is known about their specific behavior. They inhabit coastal and savanna regions.

== Conservation ==
The species is listed as Least Concern by the South African National Biodiversity Institute despite being known only from females, due to its wide geographical range. It is protected in multiple reserves including Ndumo Game Reserve, uMkhuze Game Reserve, and Verloren Vallei Nature Reserve.
