= Locketidium =

Scientific classification
- Kingdom: Animalia
- Phylum: Arthropoda
- Subphylum: Chelicerata
- Class: Arachnida
- Order: Araneae
- Infraorder: Araneomorphae
- Family: Linyphiidae
- Genus: Locketidium; Jocqué, 1981

Type species
- L. bosmansi Jocqué, 1981

Species
- L. bosmansi Jocqué, 1981 – Malawi; L. couloni Jocqué, 1981 – Kenya; L. stuarti Scharff, 1990 – Tanzania

Genus of spiders

Locketidium is a genus of East African dwarf spiders that was first described by R. Jocqué in 1981. As of May 2019 it contains only three species, found in Kenya, Malawi, and Tanzania: L. bosmansi, L. couloni, and L. stuarti.
