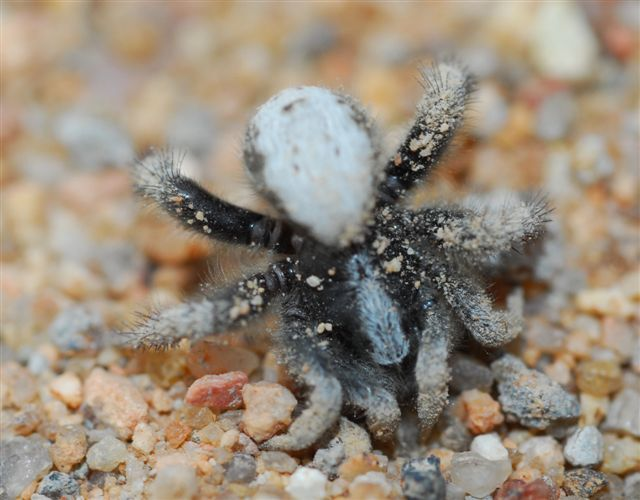
- Female P. deserticola

Scientific classification
- Kingdom: Animalia
- Phylum: Arthropoda
- Subphylum: Chelicerata
- Class: Arachnida
- Order: Araneae
- Infraorder: Araneomorphae
- Family: Zodariidae
- Genus: Psammoduon; Jocqué

Type species
- Psammoduon deserticola

Species
- see text

= Psammoduon =

Genus of spiders

Psammoduon is a genus of southern African spiders in the family Zodariidae with three species. It was first described in 1991 by Jocqué.

== Species ==
As of September 2025, this genus includes three species:

- Psammoduon arenicola (Simon, 1910) – South Africa
- Psammoduon canosum (Simon, 1910) – Namibia, South Africa
- Psammoduon deserticola (Simon, 1910) – Namibia, South Africa (type species)
