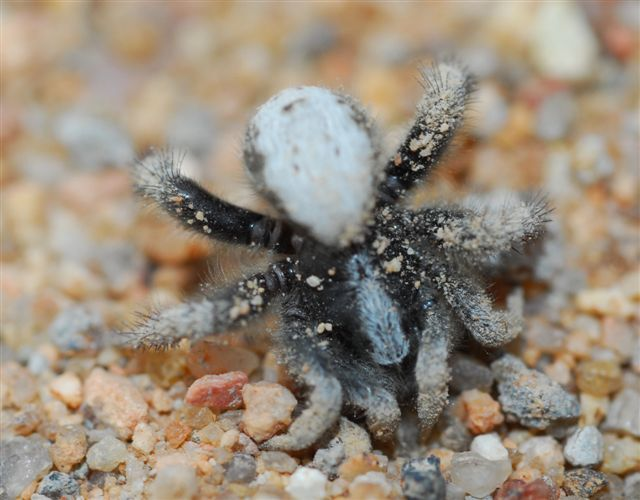
- Female

Scientific classification
- Kingdom: Animalia
- Phylum: Arthropoda
- Subphylum: Chelicerata
- Class: Arachnida
- Order: Araneae
- Infraorder: Araneomorphae
- Family: Zodariidae
- Genus: Psammoduon
- Species: P. deserticola

Binomial name
- Psammoduon deserticola (Simon, 1910)

Synonyms
- Caesetius deserticola Simon, 1910; Caesetius masculinus Lawrence, 1938

= Psammoduon deserticola =

Desert Psammoduon zodariid spider

Species of spider

Psammoduon deserticola is a species of spider in the family Zodariidae. It is found in Namibia and South Africa and is commonly known as the Desert Psammoduon zodariid spider.

== Distribution ==
Psammoduon deserticola is found in southern Africa, recorded from Namibia and the Northern Cape province of South Africa.

== Habitat ==
Psammoduon deserticola are ground-dwelling spiders capable of diving into loose sand. They the Succulent Karoo biome at altitudes ranging from 14 to 1,097 m above sea level.

== Description ==
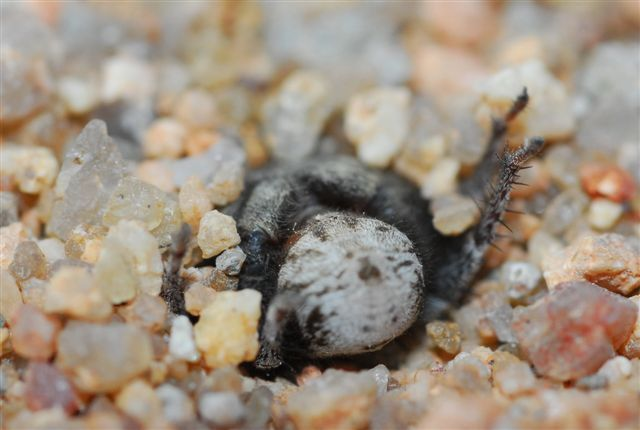
female

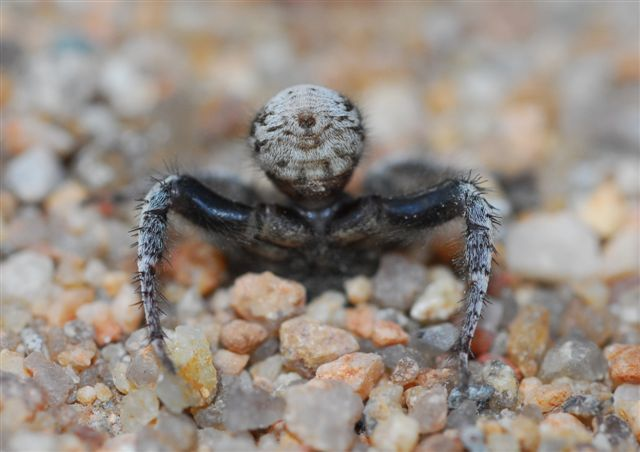
female

Psammoduon deserticola shows sexual dimorphism. Males have a total length of 5.8 mm with a carapace that is paler in the cephalic area and has a dark margin. The abdomen is white on the dorsum and dark grey on the sides. Females reach 7.49 mm in total length with similar coloration, sometimes displaying faint grey patterns on the dorsum.

== Conservation ==
The species is listed as Least Concern by the South African National Biodiversity Institute due to its wide geographical range. It is protected in Kgalagadi Transfrontier Park.
