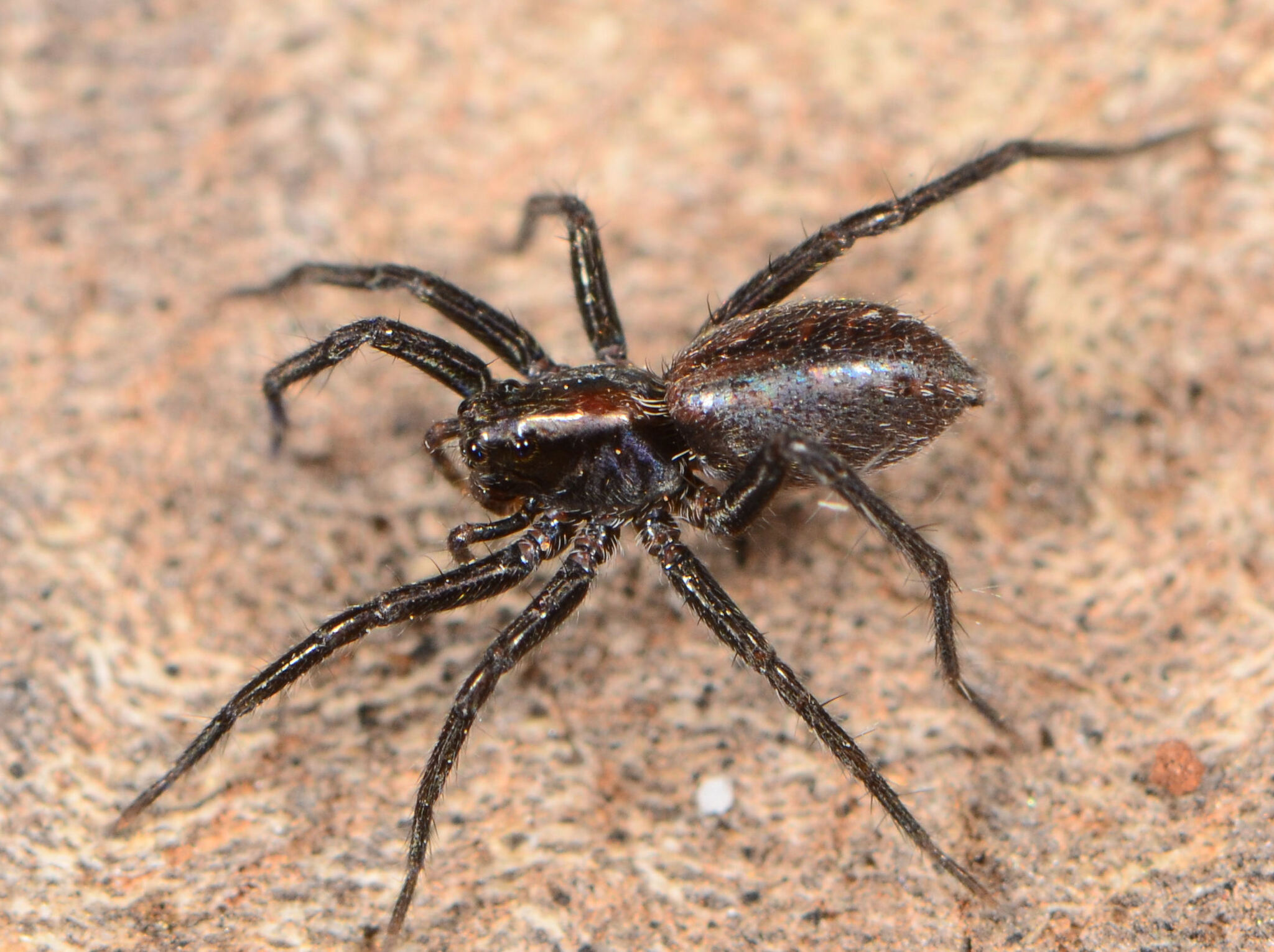
- female F. adunca
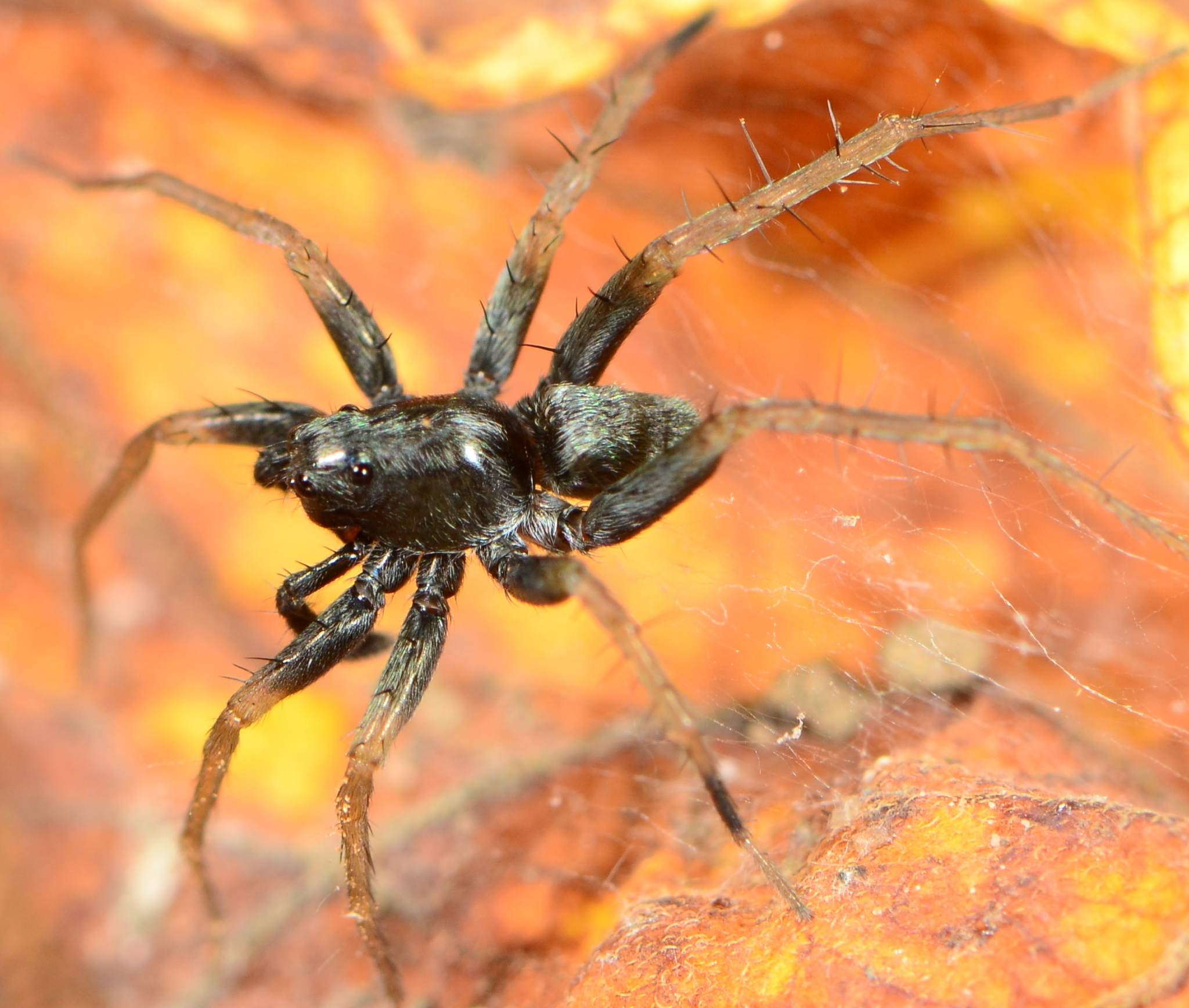
- male F. foveolata

Scientific classification
- Kingdom: Animalia
- Phylum: Arthropoda
- Subphylum: Chelicerata
- Class: Arachnida
- Order: Araneae
- Infraorder: Araneomorphae
- Family: Lycosidae
- Genus: Foveosa; Jocqué

Species
- 5, see text

= Foveosa =

Genus of spiders

Foveosa is a genus of African wolf spiders in the family Lycosidae with five described species. It was first described in 2007 by Russell-Smith, Alderweireldt & Jocqué.

== Description ==
Foveosa are small wolf spiders, with males measuring 2.75 to 5.4 mm and females 3.8 to 6.9 mm in total length.

Males often lack clear median or lateral bands on the carapace. The carapace is narrower in the cephalic region. The anterior row of eyes is lightly procurved, with the median eyes paler than the lateral eyes and positioned much nearer to the lateral eyes than to each other.

The legs bear long spines on the anterior tibia and metatarsi, with the fourth metatarsus approximately equal in length to the tibia and patella combined.

== Taxonomy ==
The genus was revised by Russell-Smith and colleagues in 2007.

== Species ==
As of October 2025, this genus includes five species:

- Foveosa adunca Russell-Smith, Alderweireldt & Jocqué, 2007 – South Africa
- Foveosa albicapillis Russell-Smith, Alderweireldt & Jocqué, 2007 – West Africa
- Foveosa foveolata (Purcell, 1903) – Central, East, Southern Africa (type species)
- Foveosa infuscata Russell-Smith, Alderweireldt & Jocqué, 2007 – Nigeria, Ghana, Ivory Coast
- Foveosa tintinabulum Russell-Smith, Alderweireldt & Jocqué, 2007 – DR Congo, Kenya
