= Akyttara =

Scientific classification
- Kingdom: Animalia
- Phylum: Arthropoda
- Subphylum: Chelicerata
- Class: Arachnida
- Order: Araneae
- Infraorder: Araneomorphae
- Family: Zodariidae
- Genus: Akyttara; Jocqué

Type species
- Akyttara akagera

Species
- Akyttara akagera Jocqué, 1987; Akyttara homunculus Jocqué, 1991; Akyttara mahnerti Jocqué, 1987; Akyttara odorocci Ono, 2004; Akyttara ritchiei Jocqué, 1987

Genus of spiders

Akyttara is a genus of mostly African spiders in the family Zodariidae with five species. It was first described in 1987 by Jocqué.

== Distribution ==
While this is mainly an African genus, found from Rwanda to South Africa, one species was described from Vietnam.

== Species ==
As of September 2025, this genus includes five species:

- Akyttara akagera Jocqué, 1987 – Rwanda (type species)
- Akyttara homunculus Jocqué, 1991 – DR Congo, Botswana, South Africa
- Akyttara mahnerti Jocqué, 1987 – Kenya
- Akyttara odorocci Ono, 2004 – Vietnam
- Akyttara ritchiei Jocqué, 1987 – Kenya
