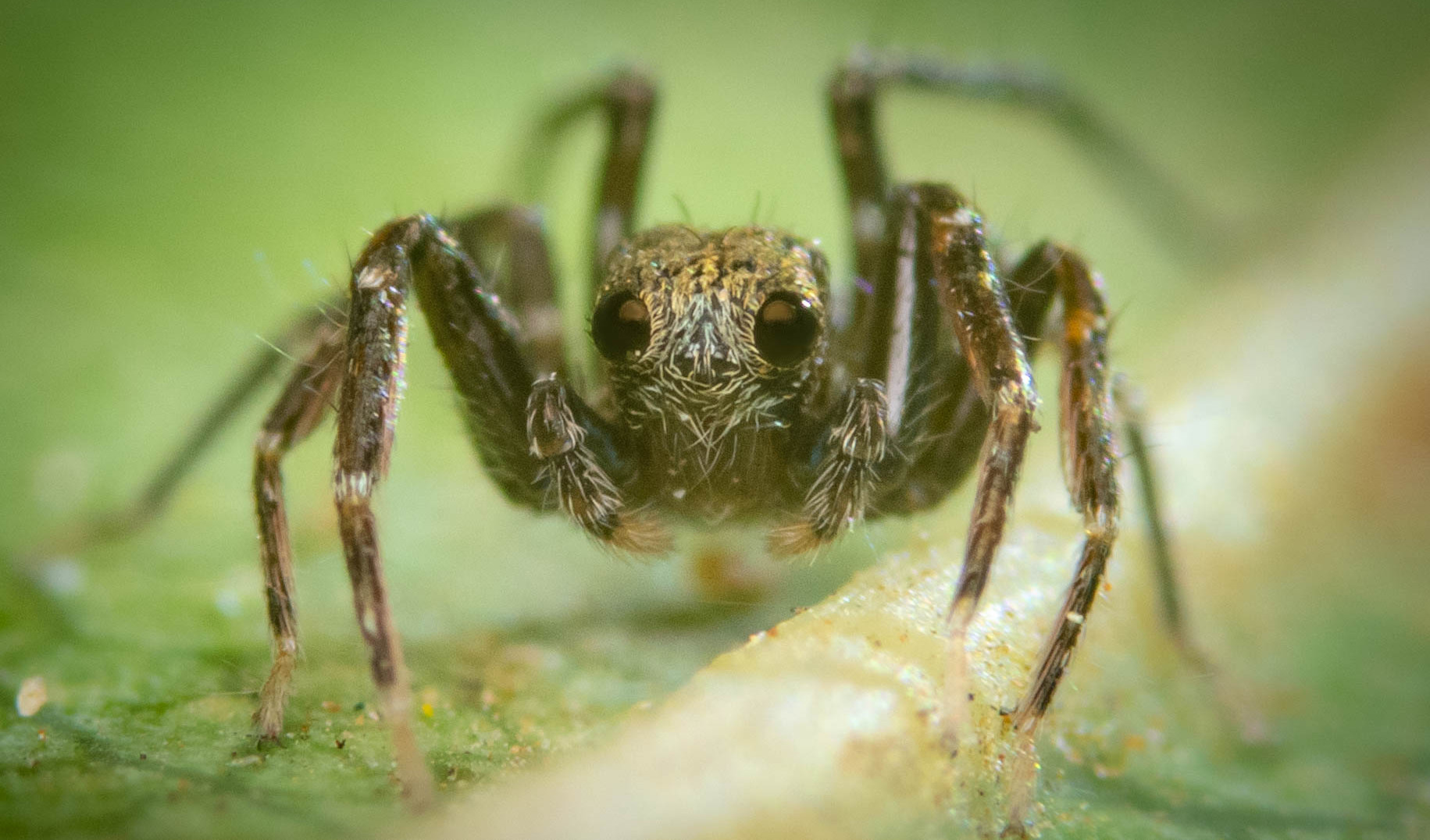
- M. neptuna
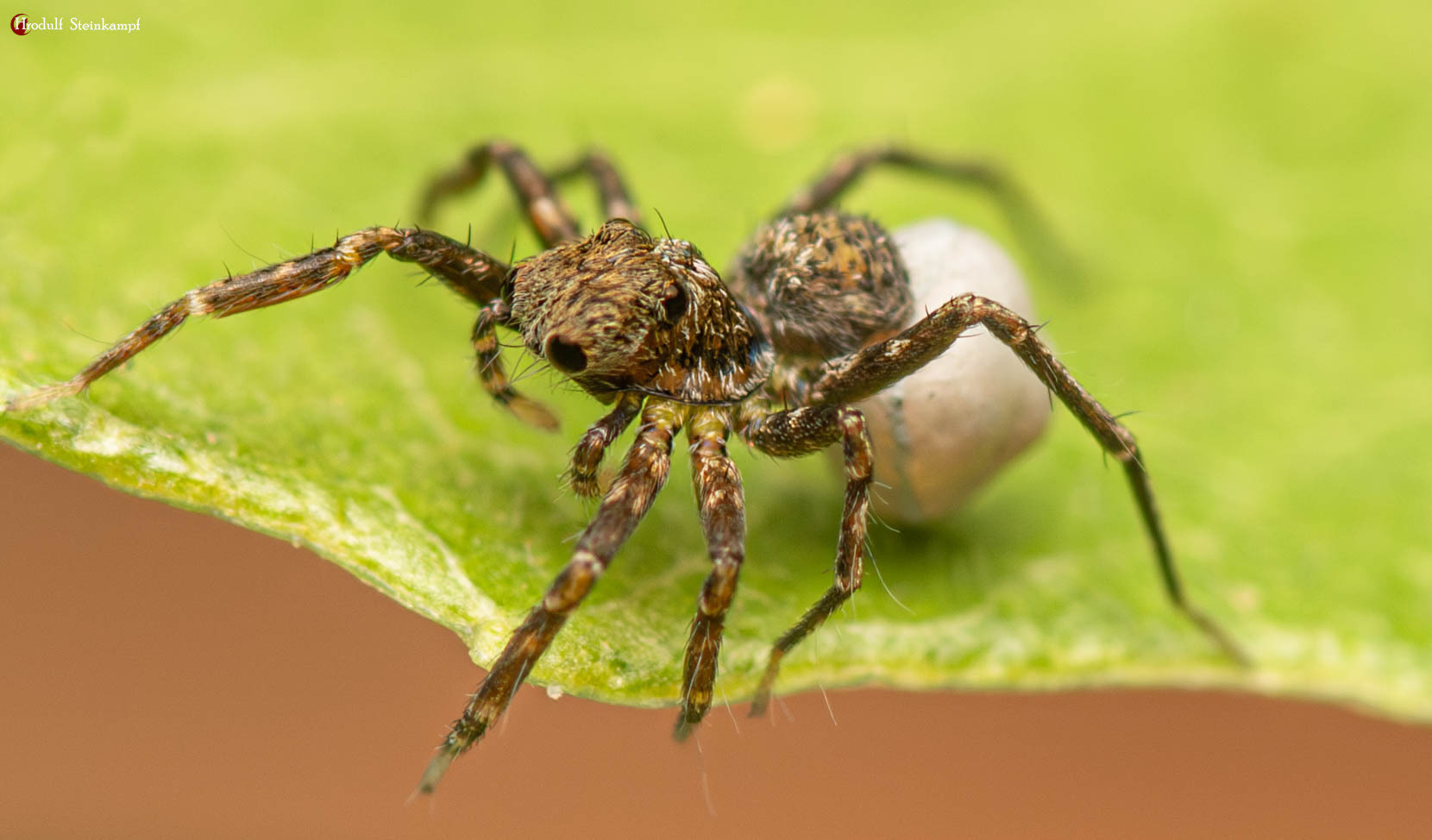
- female

Scientific classification
- Kingdom: Animalia
- Phylum: Arthropoda
- Subphylum: Chelicerata
- Class: Arachnida
- Order: Araneae
- Infraorder: Araneomorphae
- Family: Lycosidae
- Genus: Minicosa
- Species: M. neptuna

Binomial name
- Minicosa neptuna Alderweireldt & Jocqué, 2007

= Minicosa =

Large Eyed Mini Wolf Spider

Species of spider

Minicosa neptuna is the only spider species of the monotypic genus Minicosa in the family Lycosidae. It is found in southern Africa and is commonly known as the large-eyed mini wolf spider.

== Distribution ==
Minicosa neptuna is found in Mozambique and South Africa. In South Africa, it is known from the provinces KwaZulu-Natal, Limpopo, Mpumalanga, Northern Cape, and Western Cape at altitudes ranging from 5 to 1341 m.

== Habitat and ecology ==
Minicosa neptuna inhabits the Fynbos, Grassland, and Savanna biomes. The species appears to have been most often found in leaf litter. These are agile ground runners. Minicosa neptuna is active and reproduces only during a short period of the year, from March until June.

== Description ==
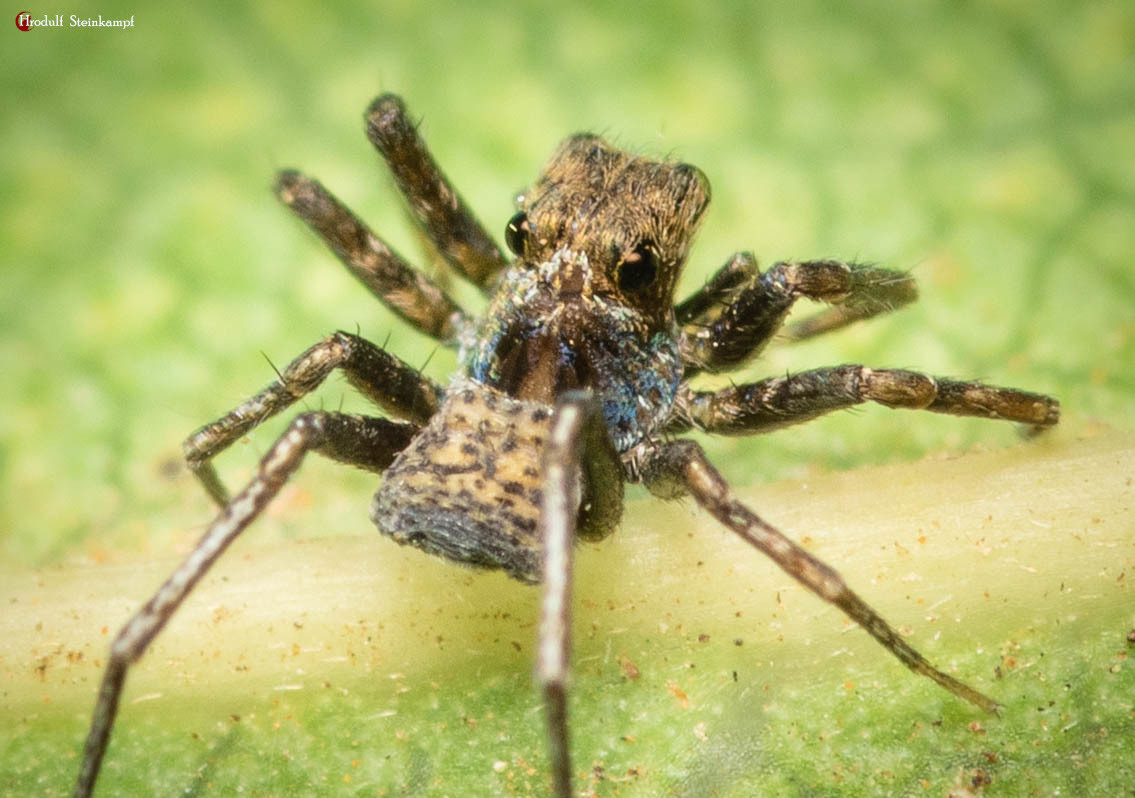

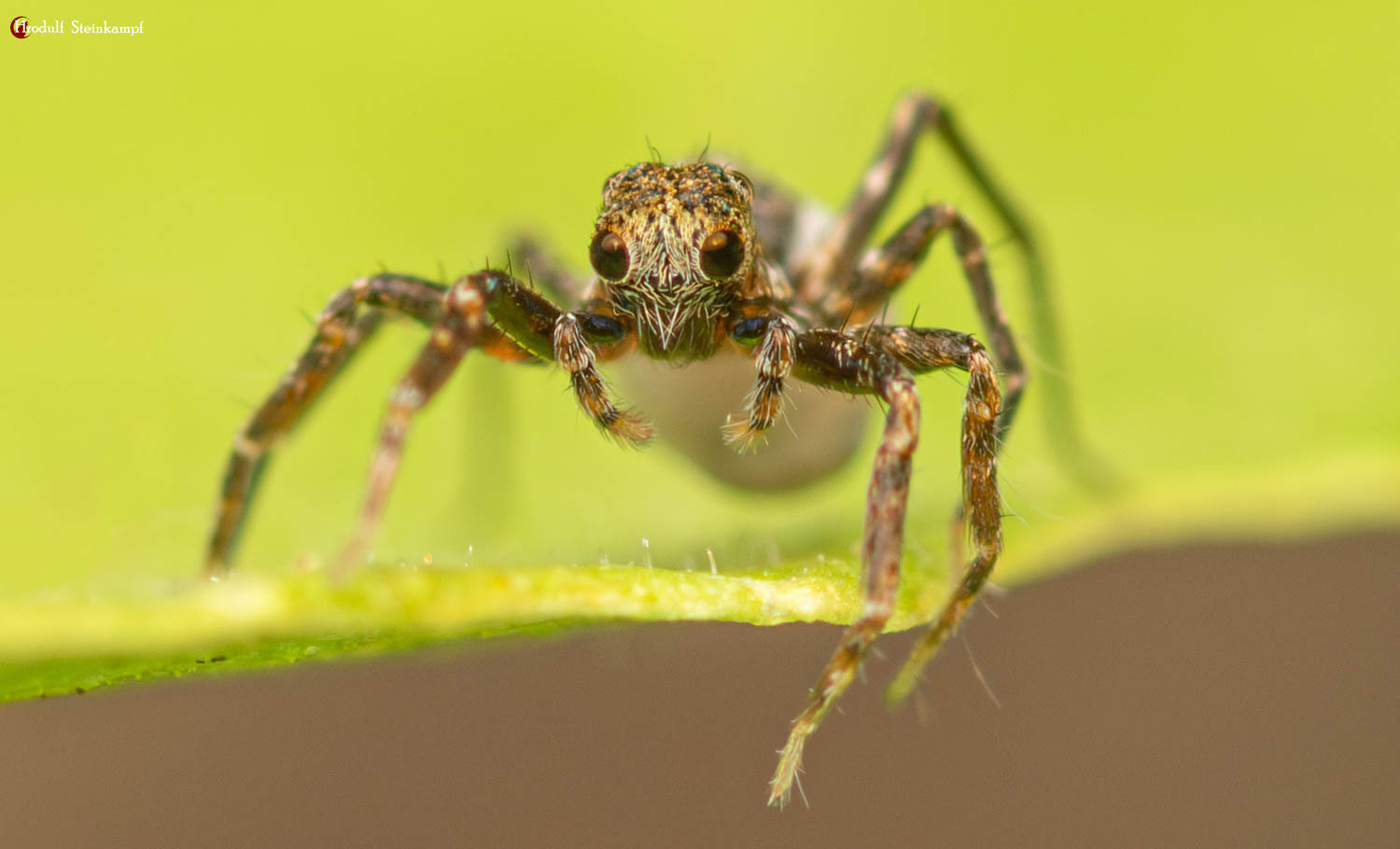

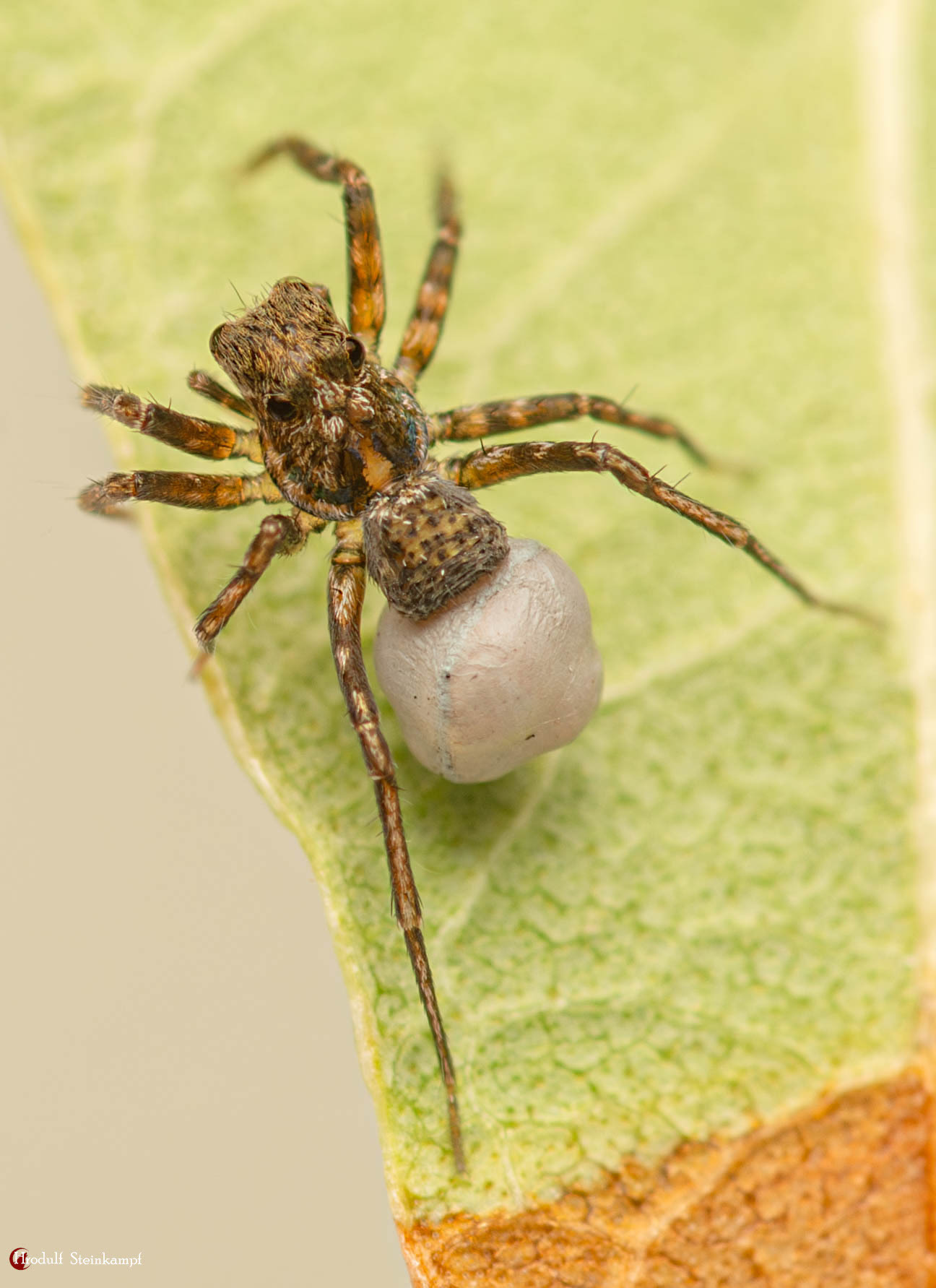

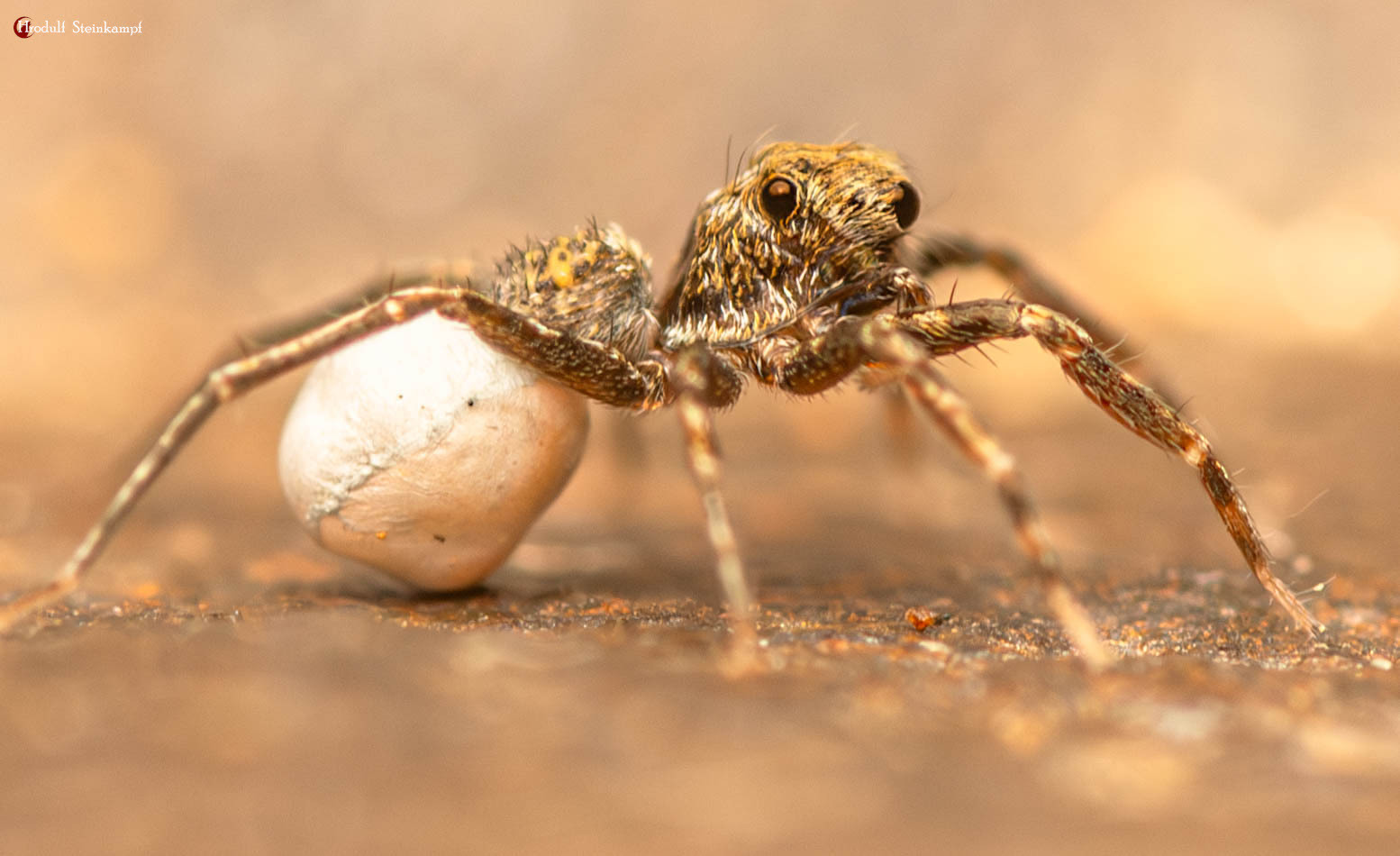

Minicosa species are very small wolf spiders, less than 2.5 mm in total length, with males smaller than females.

The carapace is yellow to pale brown mottled with dark brown to black stripes radiating from the fovea. The sides have dark lateral margins and pale yellow continuous lateral bands.

The ocular area occupies almost half of the carapace and has striking black spots around the posterior eyes. The eye pattern is characteristic with a strongly procurved front row. The posterior eyes are very large in proportion to the tiny cephalothorax, and the posterior lateral eyes are situated almost halfway down the cephalothorax. The sternum is completely pale yellow.

The abdomen dorsum is pale yellow with a series of transverse dark stripes and spots. The female abdomen is ventro-apically concave to accommodate the proportionally very large egg cocoon. The venter is completely pale yellow. Spinnerets are yellow. The legs are mainly pale yellow with only a few dark spots.

== Conservation ==
Minicosa neptuna is listed as Least Concern by the South African National Biodiversity Institute. There are no significant threats to the species and due to its wide geographical distribution range, the species is therefore listed as being of Least Concern. It is known from more than 10 protected areas.

== Taxonomy ==
Minicosa neptuna was described by Alderweireldt and Jocqué in 2007 from Embuleni Nature Reserve in Mpumalanga. The species is known from both sexes.
