= Donacosa =

Scientific classification
- Kingdom: Animalia
- Phylum: Arthropoda
- Subphylum: Chelicerata
- Class: Arachnida
- Order: Araneae
- Infraorder: Araneomorphae
- Family: Lycosidae
- Genus: Donacosa
- Species: D. merlini

Binomial name
- Donacosa merlini Alderweireldt & Jocqué, 1991

Genus of spiders

Donacosa is a genus of spiders in the family Lycosidae. It was first described in 1991 by Alderweireldt & Jocqué. As of 2017, it contains only one species, Donacosa merlini, found in Spain.
