= Ulugurella =

Scientific classification
- Kingdom: Animalia
- Phylum: Arthropoda
- Subphylum: Chelicerata
- Class: Arachnida
- Order: Araneae
- Infraorder: Araneomorphae
- Family: Linyphiidae
- Genus: Ulugurella; Jocqué & Scharff, 1986
- Species: U. longimana

Binomial name
- Ulugurella longimana Jocqué & Scharff, 1986

Genus of spiders

Ulugurella is a monotypic genus of Tanzanian sheet weavers containing the single species, Ulugurella longimana. It was first described by R. Jocqué & N. Scharff in 1986, and is only found in Tanzania.
