= Procydrela =

Scientific classification
- Kingdom: Animalia
- Phylum: Arthropoda
- Subphylum: Chelicerata
- Class: Arachnida
- Order: Araneae
- Infraorder: Araneomorphae
- Family: Zodariidae
- Genus: Procydrela; Jocqué

Type species
- Procydrela procursor

Species
- Procydrela limacola Jocqué, 1999; Procydrela procursor Jocqué, 1999

Genus of spiders

Procydrela is a genus of spiders in the family Zodariidae with two species endemic to South Africa. It was first described in 1999 by Rudy Jocqué.

== Species ==
As of September 2025, this genus includes two species:

- Procydrela limacola Jocqué, 1999
- Procydrela procursor Jocqué, 1999 (type species)
