= Murphydium =

Scientific classification
- Kingdom: Animalia
- Phylum: Arthropoda
- Subphylum: Chelicerata
- Class: Arachnida
- Order: Araneae
- Infraorder: Araneomorphae
- Family: Linyphiidae
- Genus: Murphydium; Jocqué, 1996
- Species: M. foliatum

Binomial name
- Murphydium foliatum Jocqué, 1996

Genus of spiders

Murphydium is a monotypic genus of East African dwarf spiders containing the single species, Murphydium foliatum. It was first described by R. Jocqué in 1996, and has only been found in Kenya and Somalia.
