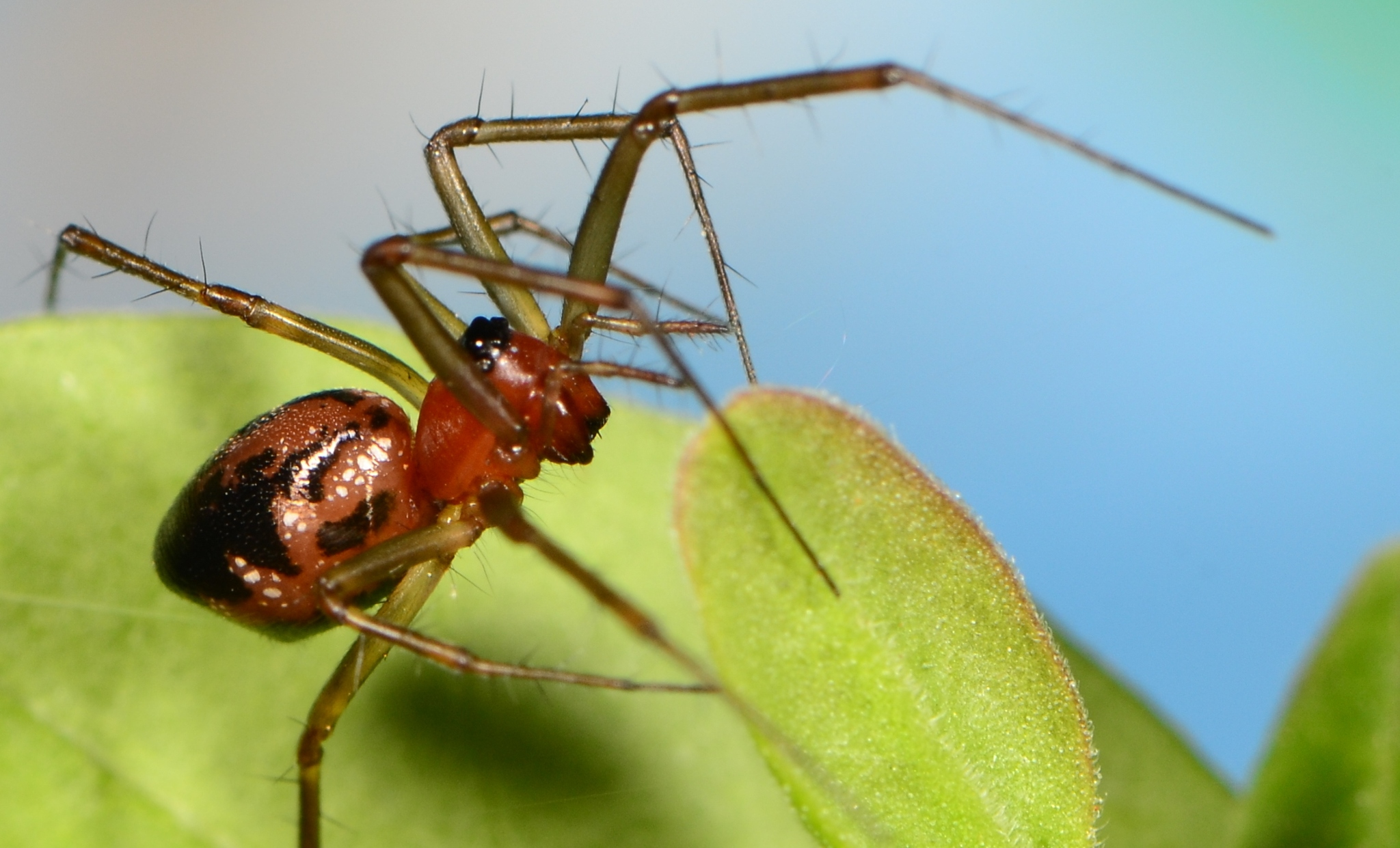
- female L. sirimoni
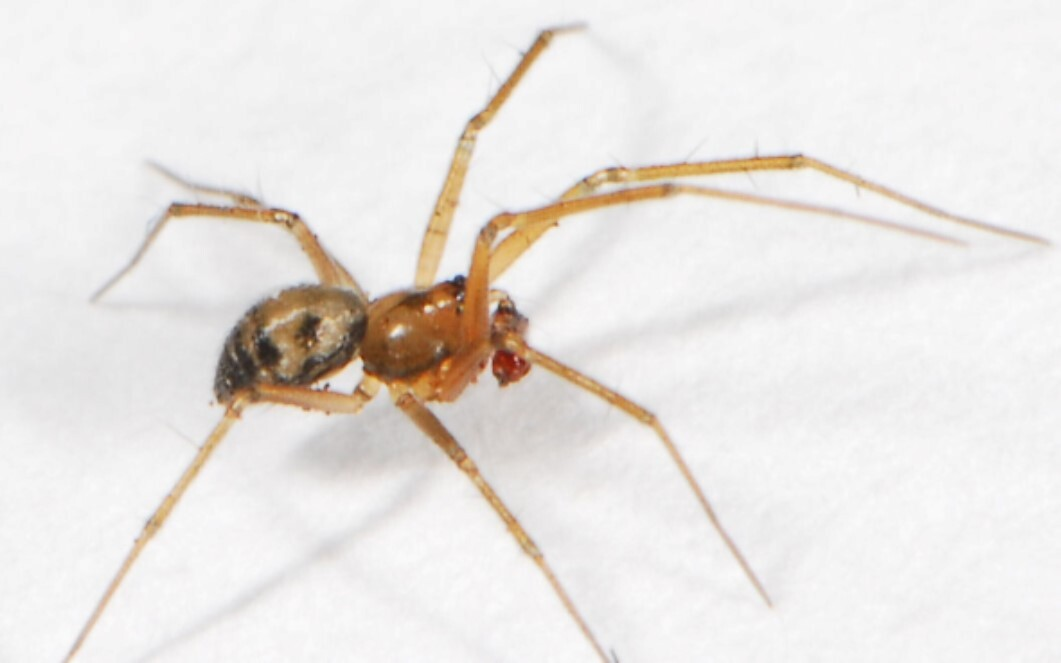
- male L. sirimoni

Scientific classification
- Kingdom: Animalia
- Phylum: Arthropoda
- Subphylum: Chelicerata
- Class: Arachnida
- Order: Araneae
- Infraorder: Araneomorphae
- Family: Linyphiidae
- Genus: Limoneta; Bosmans & Jocqué, 1983

Type species
- L. graminicola Bosmans & Jocqué, 1983

Species
- L. graminicola Bosmans & Jocqué, 1983 – Cameroon; L. sirimoni (Bosmans, 1979) – Kenya, South Africa

= Limoneta =

Genus of spiders

Limoneta is a genus of African dwarf spiders that was first described by R. Bosmans & R. Jocqué in 1983. Its two described species are found in Cameroon, Kenya, and South Africa.

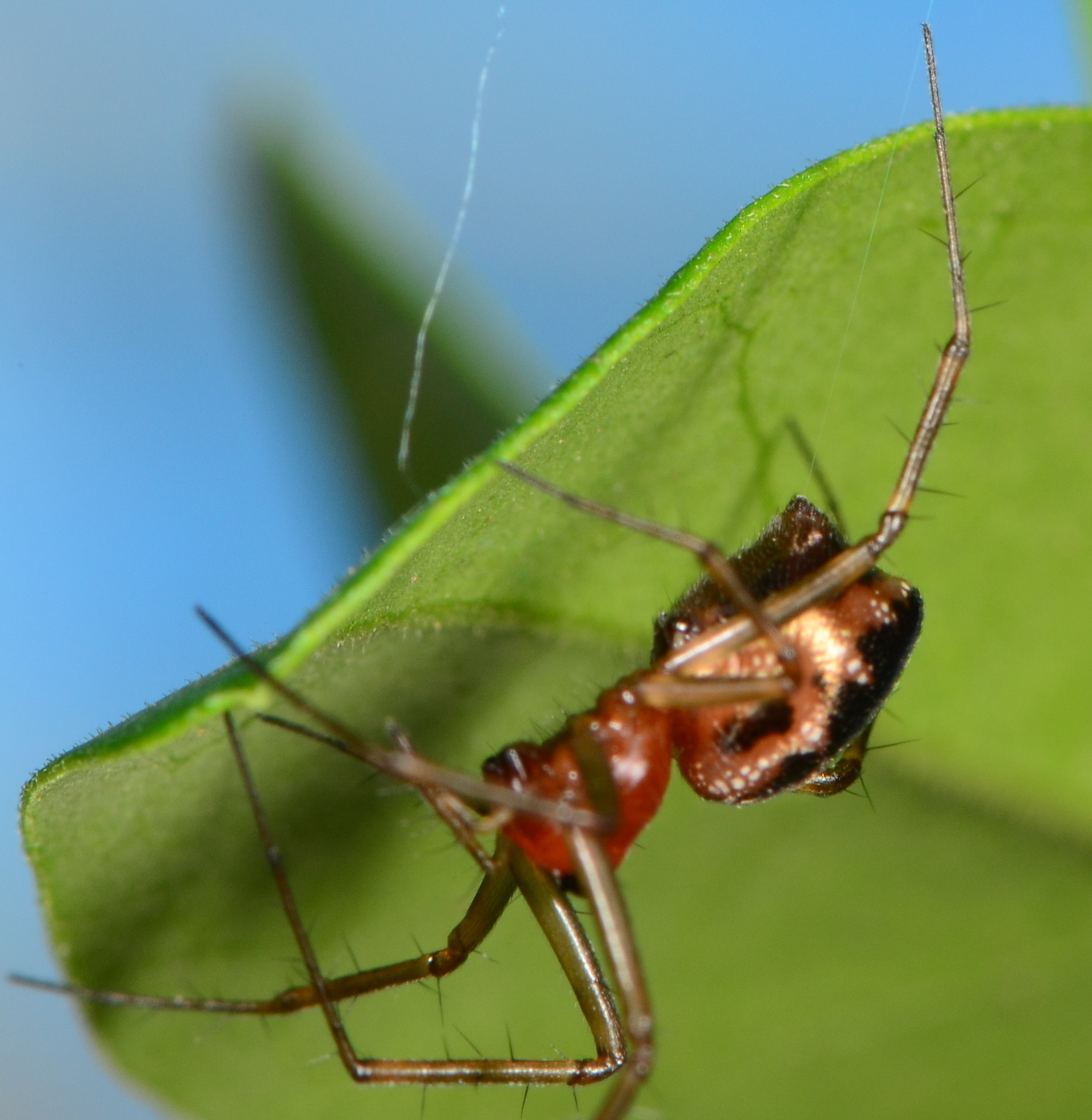
female L. sirimoni

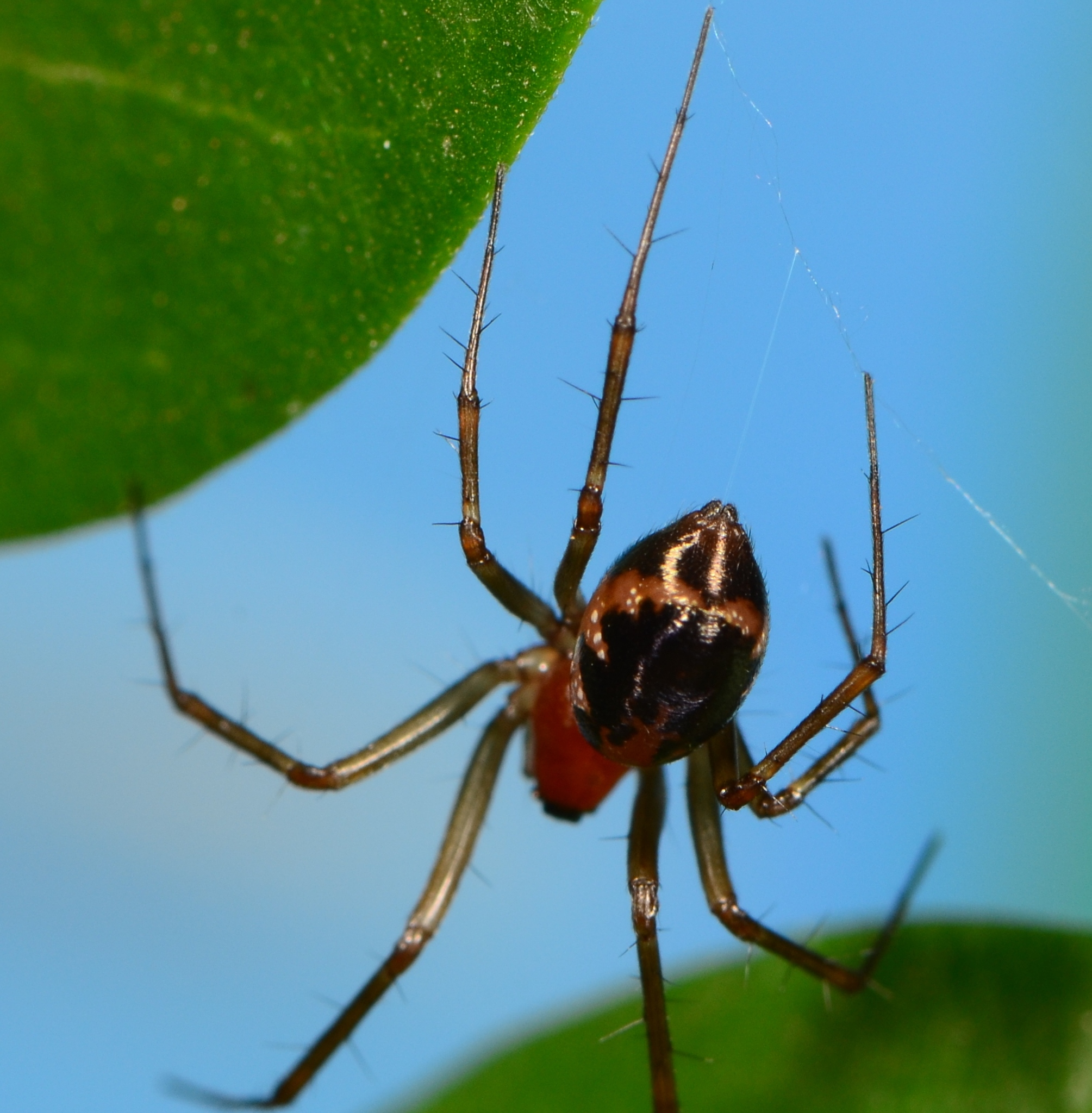
female L. sirimoni

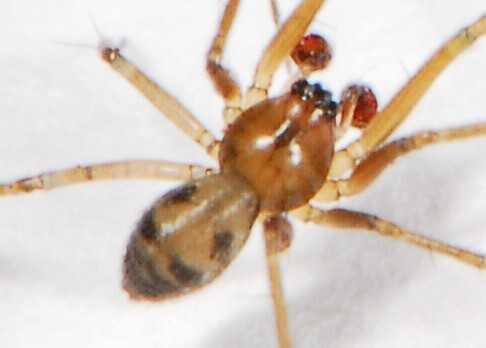
male L. sirimoni

== Species ==
As of October 2025, this genus includes two species:

- Limoneta graminicola Bosmans & Jocqué, 1983 – Cameroon (type species)
- Limoneta sirimoni (Bosmans, 1979) – Kenya, South Africa
