= Proelauna =

Scientific classification
- Kingdom: Animalia
- Phylum: Arthropoda
- Subphylum: Chelicerata
- Class: Arachnida
- Order: Araneae
- Infraorder: Araneomorphae
- Family: Linyphiidae
- Genus: Proelauna; Jocqué, 1981
- Species: P. humicola

Binomial name
- Proelauna humicola (Miller, 1970)

Genus of spiders

Proelauna is a monotypic genus of African sheet weavers containing the single species, Proelauna humicola. It was first described by R. Jocqué in 1981, and has only been found in Malawi, Tanzania, and Angola.
