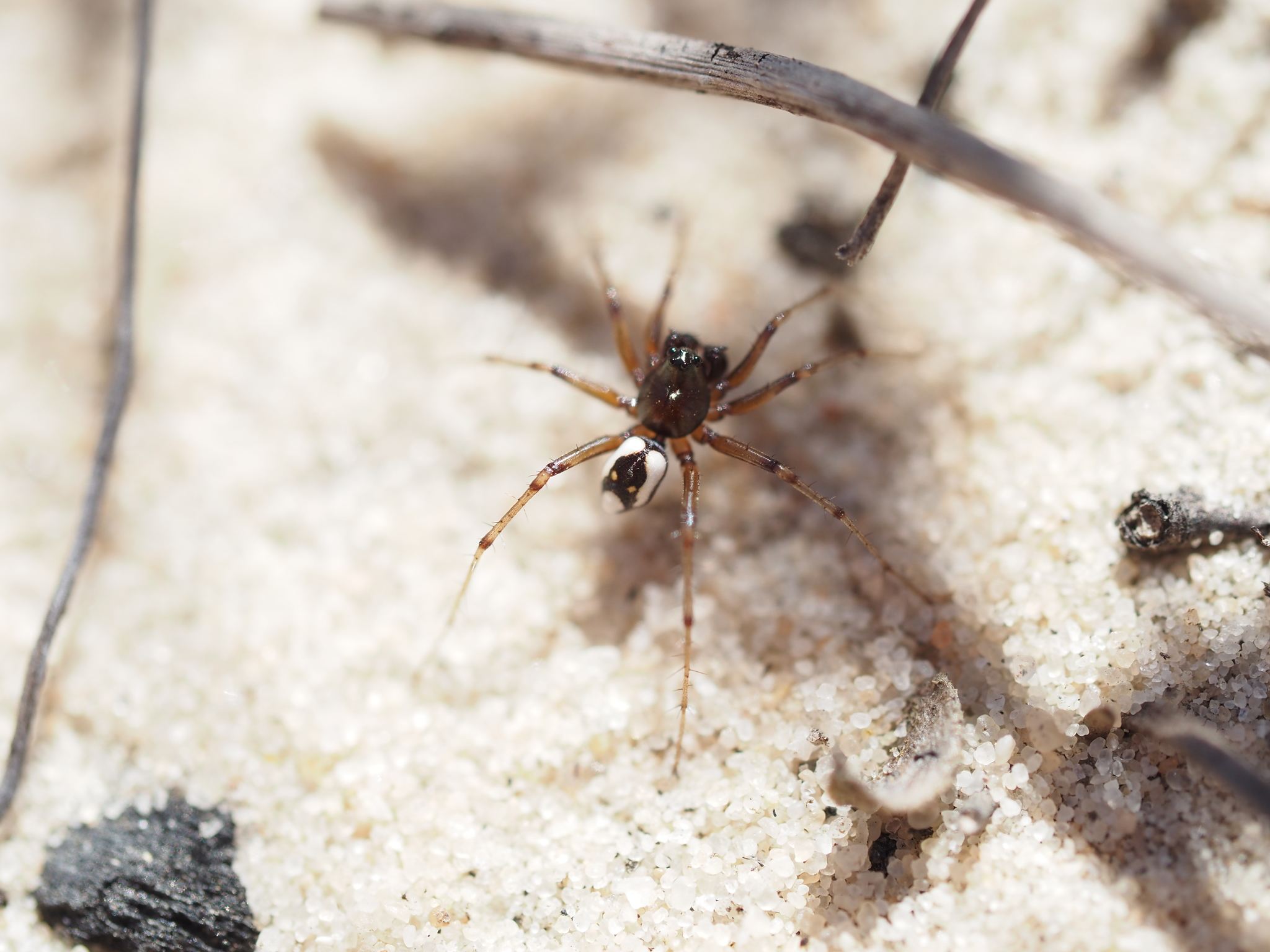
- Male A. quaerens from Australia

Scientific classification
- Kingdom: Animalia
- Phylum: Arthropoda
- Subphylum: Chelicerata
- Class: Arachnida
- Order: Araneae
- Infraorder: Araneomorphae
- Family: Zodariidae
- Genus: Australutica; Jocqué

Type species
- Australutica moreton

Species
- 6, see text

= Australutica =

Genus of spiders

Australutica is a genus of spiders in the family Zodariidae. It was first described in 1995 by Jocqué. As of 2024, it contains 6 species.

== Species ==
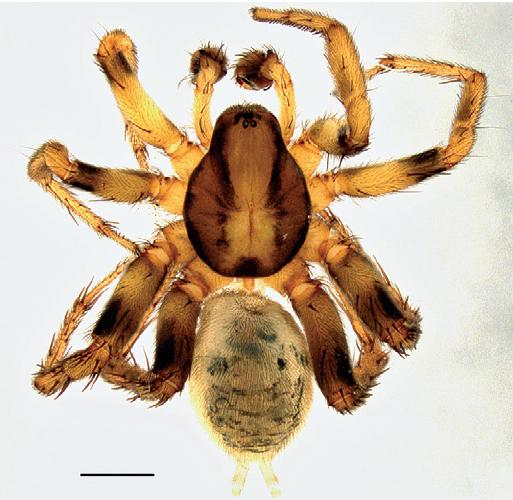
A. africana

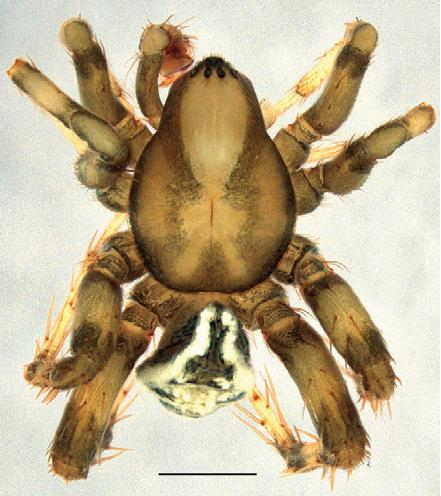
A. normanlarseni

As of September 2025, this genus includes six species:

- Australutica africana Jocqué, 2008 – South Africa
- Australutica manifesta Jocqué, 1995 – Australia (South Australia)
- Australutica moreton Jocqué, 1995 – Australia (Queensland) (type species)
- Australutica normanlarseni Jocqué, 2008 – South Africa
- Australutica quaerens Jocqué, 1995 – Australia (South Australia)
- Australutica xystarches Jocqué, 1995 – Australia (South Australia)
