= Cameroneta =

Scientific classification
- Kingdom: Animalia
- Phylum: Arthropoda
- Subphylum: Chelicerata
- Class: Arachnida
- Order: Araneae
- Infraorder: Araneomorphae
- Family: Linyphiidae
- Genus: Cameroneta; Bosmans & Jocqué, 1983
- Species: C. longiradix

Binomial name
- Cameroneta longiradix Bosmans & Jocqué, 1983

Genus of spiders

Cameroneta is a monotypic genus of Central African dwarf spiders containing the single species, Cameroneta longiradix. It was first described by R. Bosmans & R. Jocqué in 1983, and has only been found in Cameroon.
