= Psammorygma rutilans =

Scientific classification
- Kingdom: Animalia
- Phylum: Arthropoda
- Subphylum: Chelicerata
- Class: Arachnida
- Order: Araneae
- Infraorder: Araneomorphae
- Family: Zodariidae
- Genus: Psammorygma
- Species: P. rutilans

Binomial name
- Psammorygma rutilans (Simon, 1887)

Synonyms
- Cydrela rutilans Simon, 1887

Species of spider

Psammorygma rutilans is a species of spider in the family Zodariidae. It is endemic to South Africa.

== Distribution ==
Psammorygma rutilans is known only from South Africa, though the exact locality remains unspecified.

== Description ==
Psammorygma rutilans is known only from the female holotype. According to the original description, the abdomen is slightly ovate, black, silky shiny and sparsely bristly underneath, being more sparse in the epigastric region where it is slightly leathery and wrinkled.

== Conservation ==
The species is listed as Data Deficient by the IUCN. The status remains obscure as it is known only from a single specimen, and more sampling is needed to determine its range and collect additional specimens.
