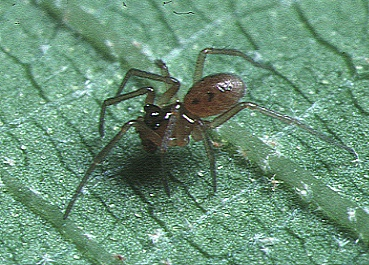
- C. formosana, male
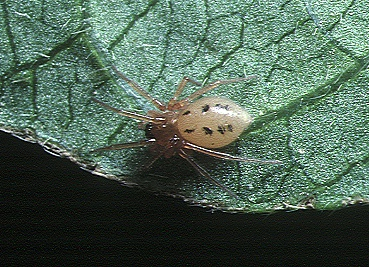
- C. formosana, female

Scientific classification
- Kingdom: Animalia
- Phylum: Arthropoda
- Subphylum: Chelicerata
- Class: Arachnida
- Order: Araneae
- Infraorder: Araneomorphae
- Family: Linyphiidae
- Genus: Callitrichia; Fage, 1936

Type species
- C. hamifera Fage, 1936

Species
- 57, see text

Synonyms
- Ophrynia Jocqué, 1981; Toschia Caporiacco, 1949

= Callitrichia =

Genus of spiders

Callitrichia is a genus of dwarf spiders that was first described by L. Fage in 1936.

Its species are found in Africa and Asia.

== Species ==
As of October 2025, this genus includes 57 species and one subspecies:

- Callitrichia aberdarensis (Holm, 1962) – Kenya
- Callitrichia afromontana Scharff, 1990 – Tanzania
- Callitrichia aliena Holm, 1962 – Algeria, Cameroon, Kenya
- Callitrichia asela Tanasevitch, 2023 – Ethiopia
- Callitrichia cacuminata Holm, 1962 – Kenya, Uganda
- Callitrichia casta (Jocqué & Scharff, 1986) – Tanzania
- Callitrichia celans (Gao, Xing & Zhu, 1996) – China
- Callitrichia concolor (Caporiacco, 1949) – Kenya
- Callitrichia convector (Tanasevitch, 2014) – Thailand
- Callitrichia criniger Scharff, 1990 – Tanzania
- Callitrichia cypericola (Jocqué, 1981) – Malawi
- Callitrichia galeata (Jocqué & Scharff, 1986) – Tanzania
  - C. g. lukwangulensis (Jocqué & Scharff, 1986) – Tanzania
- Callitrichia glabriceps Holm, 1962 – Kenya, Uganda
- Callitrichia gloriosa (Jocqué, 1984) – South Africa
- Callitrichia hamifer Fage, 1936 – Kenya, Uganda (type species)
- Callitrichia hirsuta Lin, Lopardo & Uhl, 2022 – Tanzania
- Callitrichia holmi (Wunderlich, 1978) – Tanzania
- Callitrichia inacuminata Bosmans, 1977 – Kenya
- Callitrichia incerta Miller, 1970 – Angola
- Callitrichia infecta (Jocqué & Scharff, 1986) – Tanzania
- Callitrichia insulana (Scharff, 1990) – Tanzania
- Callitrichia juguma (Scharff, 1990) – Tanzania
- Callitrichia kenyae Fage, 1936 – Kenya
- Callitrichia latitibialis (Bosmans, 1988) – Cameroon
- Callitrichia legrandi (Jocqué, 1985) – Comoros
- Callitrichia longiducta (Bosmans, 1988) – Guinea, Cameroon
- Callitrichia macrophthalma (Locket & Russell-Smith, 1980) – Nigeria, Ivory Coast
- Callitrichia marakweti Fage, 1936 – Kenya
- Callitrichia meruensis Holm, 1962 – Tanzania
- Callitrichia minuta (Jocqué, 1984) – South Africa
- Callitrichia mira (Jocqué & Scharff, 1986) – Tanzania
- Callitrichia monoceros (Miller, 1970) – Angola
- Callitrichia monticola (Tullgren, 1910) – Tanzania
- Callitrichia muscicola (Bosmans, 1988) – Cameroon
- Callitrichia obtusifrons Miller, 1970 – Angola
- Callitrichia paludicola Holm, 1962 – Tanzania
- Callitrichia paralegrandi (Tanasevitch, 2016) – India (Himalaya)
- Callitrichia perspicua (Scharff, 1990) – Tanzania
- Callitrichia picta (Caporiacco, 1949) – DR Congo, Kenya
- Callitrichia pileata (Jocqué & Scharff, 1986) – Tanzania
- Callitrichia pilosa (Wunderlich, 1978) – Ethiopia
- Callitrichia protegularis Tanasevitch, 2023 – Ethiopia
- Callitrichia revelatrix (Jocqué & Scharff, 1986) – Tanzania
- Callitrichia rostrata (Jocqué & Scharff, 1986) – Tanzania
- Callitrichia ruwenzoriensis Holm, 1962 – Uganda
- Callitrichia sellafrontis Scharff, 1990 – Tanzania
- Callitrichia silvatica Holm, 1962 – Kenya, Uganda, Malawi
- Callitrichia summicola (Jocqué & Scharff, 1986) – Tanzania
- Callitrichia superciliosa (Jocqué, 1981) – Malawi
- Callitrichia taeniata Holm, 1968 – Tanzania
- Callitrichia telekii (Holm, 1962) – Kenya
- Callitrichia trituberculata (Bosmans, 1988) – Cameroon
- Callitrichia truncatula (Scharff, 1990) – Tanzania
- Callitrichia turrita Holm, 1962 – Tanzania
- Callitrichia uncata (Jocqué & Scharff, 1986) – Tanzania
- Callitrichia usitata (Jocqué & Scharff, 1986) – Tanzania
- Callitrichia virgo (Jocqué & Scharff, 1986) – Tanzania
