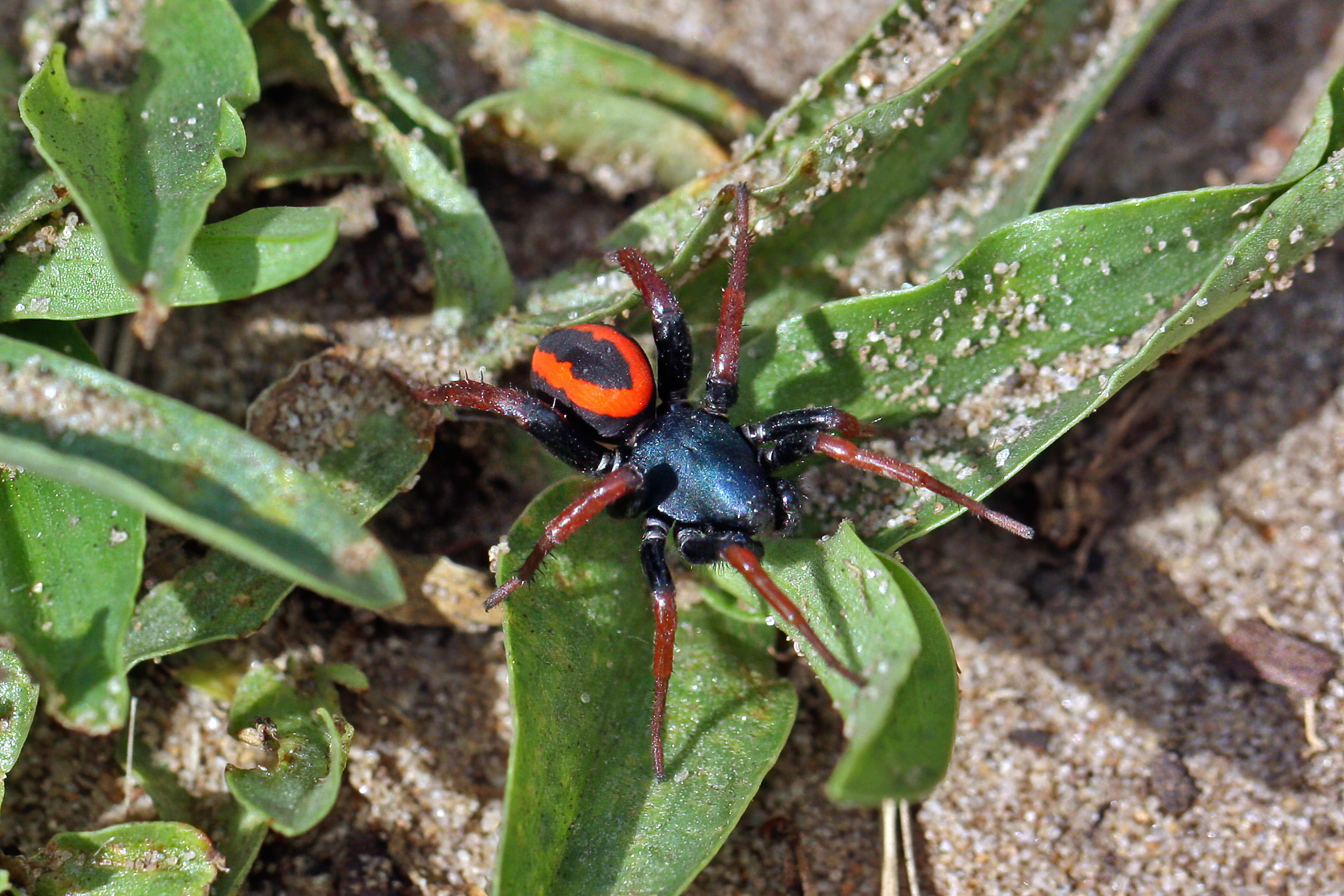
- P. aculeatum
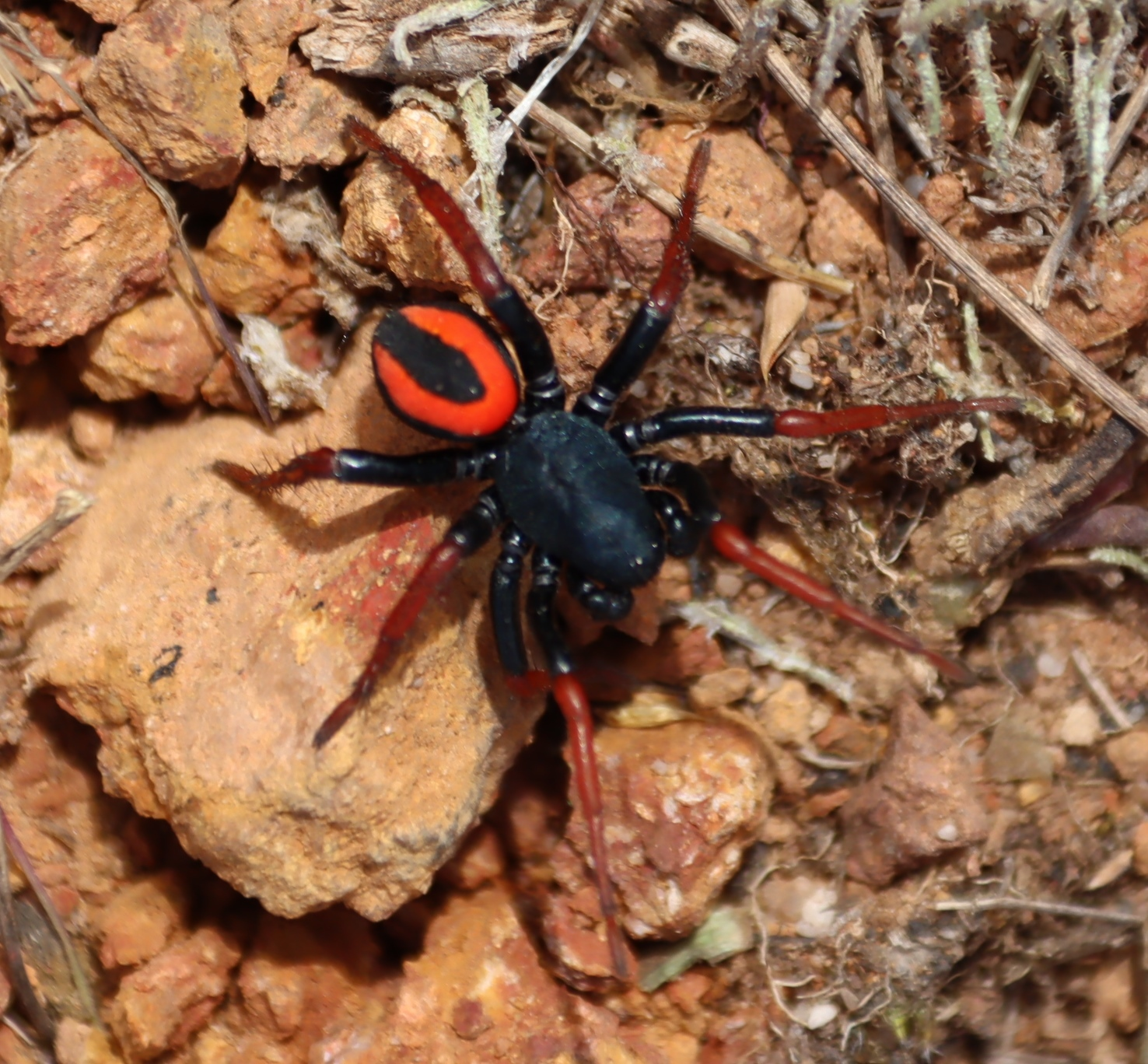
- P. aculeatum

Scientific classification
- Kingdom: Animalia
- Phylum: Arthropoda
- Subphylum: Chelicerata
- Class: Arachnida
- Order: Araneae
- Infraorder: Araneomorphae
- Family: Zodariidae
- Genus: Psammorygma; Jocqué

Type species
- Psammorygma caligatum

Species
- see text

= Psammorygma =

Genus of arachnids

Psammorygma is a genus of African ant spiders found in the deserts of southern Africa, namely the Kalahari Desert and the Namib Desert.

== Description ==
They are somewhat larger spiders, growing up to twenty millimeters in length. The carapace and chelicerae are brightly colored, while the legs and abdomen are generally a darker black or gray. They can be distinguished from other genera by a knob-like proximal extension found on the cheliceral fang and a double row of dorsal spines in a specific location.

== Etymology ==
First described in 1991 by Jocqué, the name is from the Greek psammon, meaning "sand", and orugma, meaning "mine", in reference to the sandy tunnels these spiders live in.

== Species ==
As of September 2025, the genus contains three species:

- Psammorygma aculeatum (Karsch, 1878) - South Africa
- Psammorygma caligatum Jocqué, 1991 - Namibia
- Psammorygma rutilans (Simon, 1887) - South Africa
