= Tolma =

Scientific classification
- Kingdom: Animalia
- Phylum: Arthropoda
- Subphylum: Chelicerata
- Class: Arachnida
- Order: Araneae
- Infraorder: Araneomorphae
- Family: Pisauridae
- Genus: Tolma; Jocqué, 1994
- Species: T. toreuta

Binomial name
- Tolma toreuta Jocqué, 1994

Genus of spiders

Tolma is a monotypic genus of Malagasy nursery web spiders containing the single species, Tolma toreuta. It was first described by R. Jocqué in 1994, and is only found on Madagascar.
