= Hala (spider) =

Scientific classification
- Kingdom: Animalia
- Phylum: Arthropoda
- Subphylum: Chelicerata
- Class: Arachnida
- Order: Araneae
- Infraorder: Araneomorphae
- Family: Pisauridae
- Genus: Hala; Jocqué, 1994

Type species
- H. impigra Jocqué, 1994

Species
- H. impigra Jocqué, 1994 – Madagascar; H. paulyi Jocqué, 1994 – Madagascar

Genus of spiders

Hala is a genus of Malagasy nursery web spiders that was first described by R. Jocqué in 1994. As of June 2019 it contains only two species, found only on Madagascar: H. impigra and H. paulyi.
