= Rudy Jocqué =

Belgian arachnologist (born 1946)

- Born: 1946; Belgium
- Known for: Research on Afrotropical spiders
- Scientific career
- Fields: Arachnology
- Institutions: Royal Museum for Central Africa, Tervuren

Rudy Jocqué, abbreviated Jocqué, (born 1946) is a Belgian arachnologist.

He worked at the Royal Museum for Central Africa in Tervuren. He is a specialist in spiders of the Afrotropical realm.

== Field studies ==
Part of his arachnological taxonomy studies are focused mainly on the families Zodariidae and Linyphiidae. He has also participated in numerous revisions of genera belonging to the families Ctenidae, Lycosidae, and Corinnidae, and evaluates the habitat consistency of numerous references.

In the field of ethology, he has studied the degree of adaptation of spiders to changing forest conditions in Central Africa and their influence on biological diversity.

== Expeditions ==
In the last decade, he has frequently visited Central Africa, particularly the Democratic Republic of the Congo, where he founded the Mikembo Sanctuary near Lubumbashi. The sanctuary serves as a school for the study of invertebrate biodiversity and promotes education on collection methods and local awareness of the ecological importance of invertebrates.

== Taxa named in his honour ==
- Hahnia jocquei Bosmans, 1982
- Gallieniella jocquei Platnick, 1984
- Afrilobus jocquei Griswold & Platnick, 1987
- Thomisus jocquei Dippenaar-Schoeman, 1988
- Xevioso jocquei Griswold, 1990
- Evippa jocquei Alderweireldt, 1991
- Setaphis jocquei Platnick & Murphy, 1996
- Goleba jocquei Szüts, 2001
- Oedignatha jocquei Deeleman-Reinhold, 2001
- Raecius jocquei Griswold, 2002
- Cheiramiona jocquei Lotz, 2003
- Garcorops jocquei Corronca, 2003
- Habronestes jocquei Baehr, 2003
- Spermophora jocquei Huber, 2003
- Selenops jocquei Corronca, 2005
- Zelotes jocquei FitzPatrick, 2007

== Described taxa ==
- Akyttara Jocqué, 1987
- Amphiledorus Jocqué & Bosmans, 2001
- Antillorena Jocqué, 1991
- Antoonops Fannes & Jocqué, 2008
- Araeoncus malawiensis Jocqué, 1981
- Araeoncus viphyensis Jocqué, 1981
- Aschema Jocqué, 1991
- Asteron Jocqué, 1991
- Australutica Jocqué, 1995
- Cameroneta longiradix Bosmans & Jocqué, 1983
- Cameroneta Bosmans & Jocqué, 1983
- Cavasteron Baehr & Jocqué, 2000
- Chilumena Jocqué, 1995
- Chummidae Jocqué, 2001
- Chumma Jocqué, 2001
- Chumma gastroperforata Jocqué, 2001
- Chumma inquieta Jocqué, 2001
- Colima Jocqué & Baehr, 2005
- Comorella Jocqué, 1985
- Comorella spectabilis Jocqué, 1985
- Deelemania Jocqué & Bosmans, 1983
- Deelemania gabonensis Jocqué, 1983
- Deelemania malawiensis Jocqué & Russell-Smith, 1984
- Deelemania manensis Jocqué & Bosmans, 1983
- Donacosa Alderweireldt & Jocqué, 1991
- Donacosa merlini Alderweireldt & Jocqué, 1991
- Dusmadiores Jocqué, 1987
- Dusmadiores doubeni Jocqué, 1987
- Dusmadiores katelijnae Jocqué, 1987
- Dusmadiores robanja Jocqué, 1987
- Epicratinus Jocqué & Baehr, 2005
- Euryeidon Dankittipakul & Jocqué, 2004
- Forsterella Jocqué, 1991
- Forsterella faceta Jocqué, 1991
- Foveosa Russell-Smith, Alderweireldt & Jocqué, 2007
- Griswoldia Dippenaar-Schoeman & Jocqué, 1997
- Hala Jocqué, 1994
- Heradion Dankittipakul & Jocqué, 2004
- Holmelgonia Jocqué & Scharff, 2007
- Koinothrix Jocqué, 1981
- Koinothrix pequenops Jocqué, 1981
- Lachesana insensibilis Jocqué, 1991
- Leptasteron Baehr & Jocqué, 2001
- Limoneta Bosmans & Jocqué, 1983
- Locketidium Jocqué, 1981
- Mastidiores Jocqué, 1987
- Mastidiores kora Jocqué, 1987
- Metaleptyphantes vates Jocqué, 1983
- Microdiores Jocqué, 1987
- Microdiores aurantioviolaceus Nzigidahera & Jocqué, 2010
- Microdiores chowo Jocqué, 1987
- Microdiores rwegura Nzigidahera & Jocqué, 2010
- Microdiores violaceus Nzigidahera & Jocqué, 2010
- Minasteron Baehr & Jocqué, 2000
- Minicosa Alderweireldt & Jocqué, 2007
- Minicosa neptuna Alderweireldt & Jocqué, 2007
- Murphydium Jocqué, 1996
- Murphydium foliatum Jocqué, 1996
- Neoeburnella avocalis (Jocqué & Bosmans, 1983)
- Nostera Jocqué, 1991
- Ophrynia Jocqué, 1981
- Ophrynia superciliosa Jocqué, 1981
- Pachydelphus Jocqué & Bosmans, 1983
- Pelecopsis malawiensis Jocqué, 1977
- Pentasteron Baehr & Jocqué, 2001
- Petaloctenus Jocqué & Steyn, 1997
- Phenasteron Baehr & Jocqué, 2001
- Platnickia Jocqué, 1991
- Procydrela Jocqué, 1999
- Proelauna Jocqué, 1981
- Psammoduon Jocqué, 1991
- Psammorygma Jocqué, 1991
- Pseudasteron Jocqué & Baehr, 2001
- Pseudasteron simile Jocqué & Baehr, 2001
- Ranops Jocqué, 1991
- Rotundrela Jocqué, 1999
- Storosa Jocqué, 1991
- Subasteron Baehr & Jocqué, 2001
- Subasteron daviesae Baehr & Jocqué, 2001
- Suffasia Jocqué, 1991
- Tolma Jocqué, 1994
- Tolma toreuta Jocqué, 1994
- Toxoniella Warui & Jocqué, 2002
- Tropizodium Jocqué & Churchill, 2005
- Tybaertiella Jocqué, 1979
- Ulugurella Jocqué & Scharff, 1986
- Ulugurella longimana Jocqué & Scharff, 1986
- Venia Seyfulina & Jocqué, 2009
- Venia kakamega Seyfulina & Jocqué, 2009
- Zillimata Jocqué, 1995
