= Diores radulifer =

Steinkopf Igloo spider

Conservation status
- Least Concern (SANBI Red List)

Scientific classification
- Kingdom: Animalia
- Phylum: Arthropoda
- Subphylum: Chelicerata
- Class: Arachnida
- Order: Araneae
- Infraorder: Araneomorphae
- Family: Zodariidae
- Genus: Diores
- Species: D. radulifer

Binomial name
- Diores radulifer Simon, 1910

Species of spider

Diores radulifer is a species of spider in the family Zodariidae. It occurs in southern Africa and is commonly known as the Steinkopf Igloo spider.

== Distribution ==
Diores radulifer is found in South Africa and Namibia. In South Africa, it is known from the Northern Cape province, including Steinkopf where it was originally described.

== Habitat ==
The species inhabits the Desert and Succulent Karoo biomes at altitudes ranging from 250 to 1169 metres above sea level.

== Description ==
Males of Diores radulifer have a total length of 4.08 mm, while females range from 4 to 7 mm. The carapace, chelicerae, and legs are brownish-yellow, with the sternum being pale yellow.

Males have a pale dorsal scutum flanked by narrow dark lateral stripes, with the remainder of the opisthosoma being yellow. Females have a yellowish-orange carapace and chelicerae, yellow legs and sternum, and the abdomen dorsally shows two large black longitudinal bands with sinuous margins.

== Ecology ==
Diores radulifer are free-living ground-dwellers that construct igloo-shaped retreats with small stones, characteristic behavior of the genus Diores.

== Conservation ==
The species is listed as Least Concern. Despite having a restricted distribution in South Africa, extensive areas of natural habitat remain within its range and it faces no threats. It is protected in Richtersveld National Park and Namaqua National Park.
