= Diores magicus =

Magical Igloo spider

Conservation status
- Least Concern (SANBI Red List)

Scientific classification
- Kingdom: Animalia
- Phylum: Arthropoda
- Subphylum: Chelicerata
- Class: Arachnida
- Order: Araneae
- Infraorder: Araneomorphae
- Family: Zodariidae
- Genus: Diores
- Species: D. magicus

Binomial name
- Diores magicus Jocqué & Dippenaar-Schoeman, 1992

Species of spider

Diores magicus is a species of spider in the family Zodariidae. It occurs in southern Africa and is commonly known as the Magical Igloo spider.

== Distribution ==
Diores magicus is found in South Africa and Zimbabwe. In South Africa, it is known only from Limpopo province, where it has been recorded from numerous localities including nature reserves and the Soutpansberg region.

== Habitat ==
The species inhabits the Savanna biome at altitudes ranging from 582 to 1523 m above sea level.

== Description ==
Males of Diores magicus have a total length of 4 mm, while females are larger at 6 mm. The carapace and legs are yellowish-orange in both sexes, with the carapace having a very faint pattern in front of the fovea and being darkened in the ocular area and on the clypeus. Males have a very dark sepia opisthosoma with a narrow pale brown scutum in front, followed by five or six anastomosing chevrons. Females have a dark sepia abdomen with a row of five pale chevrons, with the sides and venter being pale in both sexes.

== Ecology ==
Diores magicus are free-living ground-dwellers that construct the characteristic igloo-shaped retreats typical of the genus Diores.

== Conservation ==
The species is listed as Least Concern due to its wide geographical range in southern Africa. It is protected in several nature reserves including Blouberg Nature Reserve, Polokwane Nature Reserve, and Nylsvley Nature Reserve.
