= Diores silvestris =

Scientific classification
- Kingdom: Animalia
- Phylum: Arthropoda
- Subphylum: Chelicerata
- Class: Arachnida
- Order: Araneae
- Infraorder: Araneomorphae
- Family: Zodariidae
- Genus: Diores
- Species: D. silvestris

Binomial name
- Diores silvestris Jocqué, 1990

Species of spider

Diores silvestris is a species of spider in the family Zodariidae. It is endemic to the Western Cape province of South Africa and is commonly known as the Tsitsikamma igloo spider.

== Distribution ==
Diores silvestris is known from three localities in the Western Cape: Tsitsikamma National Park where it was originally described, Knysna, and near Saasveld Forest Station.

== Habitat ==
The species inhabits the forest biome at altitudes ranging from 45 to 243 m above sea level. This is the only species in the genus that has been collected exclusively from forests, where it was found using pitfall traps and litter sifting.

== Description ==
Males of Diores silvestris have a total length of 3.13 mm, while females measure 3.74 mm. This is a dark species with a dark brown carapace that is darkened on the striae and clypeus. The sternum is brownish-yellow, and the legs are brownish to yellowish-orange. The dorsum of the opisthosoma is dark sepia with a large and long dark brown or black scutum in males. The sides are sepia and the venter is pale sepia but pale in front of the epigastric furrow. Females have similar coloration but lack the abdominal scutum.

== Ecology ==
Diores silvestris are free-living ground-dwellers that construct igloo-shaped retreats with small stones or leaf litter debris, characteristic behavior of the genus Diores.

== Conservation ==
The species is listed as Rare due to its small restricted distribution range. It is protected in Garden Route National Park.
