= Diores decipiens =

Scientific classification
- Kingdom: Animalia
- Phylum: Arthropoda
- Subphylum: Chelicerata
- Class: Arachnida
- Order: Araneae
- Infraorder: Araneomorphae
- Family: Zodariidae
- Genus: Diores
- Species: D. decipiens

Binomial name
- Diores decipiens Jocqué, 1990

Species of spider

Diores decipiens is a species of spider in the family Zodariidae. It is endemic to the Western Cape province of South Africa.

== Distribution ==
Diores decipiens is known only from the type locality in the Hawequas Mountains near Worcester.

== Habitat ==
The species inhabits the Fynbos biome at approximately 814 metres above sea level.

== Description ==
Both males and females of Diores decipiens are known. Males have a total length of 4.8 mm, while females measure 5.00 mm. The prosoma is uniform medium brown, though this coloration may differ in fresh specimens. The opisthosoma in females is pale, also likely different in fresh specimens.

== Ecology ==
Diores decipiens are free-living ground-dwellers that construct the characteristic igloo-shaped retreats typical of the genus Diores.

== Conservation ==
The species is listed as Data Deficient. It is probably undersampled and its distribution is poorly known. Additional sampling is needed to better understand the species' range.
