= Diores bivattatus =

Scientific classification
- Kingdom: Animalia
- Phylum: Arthropoda
- Subphylum: Chelicerata
- Class: Arachnida
- Order: Araneae
- Infraorder: Araneomorphae
- Family: Zodariidae
- Genus: Diores
- Species: D. bivattatus

Binomial name
- Diores bivattatus Simon, 1893

Species of spider

Diores bivattatus is a species of spider in the family Zodariidae and the type species of the genus Diores. It is endemic to the Western Cape province of South Africa.

== Distribution ==
Diores bivattatus is known only from the type locality of Stellenbosch in the Western Cape.

== Habitat ==
The species inhabits the Fynbos biome at approximately 103 metres above sea level.

== Description ==
Only the female of Diores bivattatus is known, with a total length of 4.92 mm. The carapace and chelicerae are yellowish-orange, while the sternum and legs are pale yellow. The opisthosoma is pale with two longitudinal black bands on the dorsum, with the remainder being pale in coloration.

== Ecology ==
Diores bivattatus are free-living ground-dwellers that construct igloo-shaped retreats, characteristic behavior of the genus Diores.

== Conservation ==
The species is listed as Data Deficient due to lack of data and taxonomic reasons. It is known only from the type locality, the male remains unknown, and its conservation status is unclear. Additional sampling is needed to collect males and determine the species' range.
