= Diores godfreyi =

Scientific classification
- Kingdom: Animalia
- Phylum: Arthropoda
- Subphylum: Chelicerata
- Class: Arachnida
- Order: Araneae
- Infraorder: Araneomorphae
- Family: Zodariidae
- Genus: Diores
- Species: D. godfreyi

Binomial name
- Diores godfreyi Hewitt, 1919

Species of spider

Diores godfreyi is a species of spider in the family Zodariidae. It is endemic to the Western Cape province of South Africa.

== Distribution ==
Diores godfreyi is known only from the type locality of Ashton in the Western Cape.

== Habitat ==
The species inhabits the Fynbos biome at approximately 167 metres above sea level.

== Description ==
Only the female of Diores godfreyi is known, with a total length of 4.2 mm. The carapace is yellow and darkened in the ocular area, while the chelicerae are yellowish-orange and the legs are pale yellow. The opisthosoma is dorsally sepia with a pale median line starting from about one-third of the abdomen length and as wide as one-third of the abdomen width, with sinuous margins that are sometimes broken into several isolated spots. The remainder of the abdomen is pale.

== Ecology ==
Diores godfreyi are free-living ground-dwellers that construct igloo-shaped retreats typical of the genus Diores.

== Conservation ==
The species is listed as Data Deficient due to lack of data and taxonomic reasons. The male remains unknown, and additional sampling is needed to collect males and determine the species' range.
