= Diores sequax =

Scientific classification
- Kingdom: Animalia
- Phylum: Arthropoda
- Subphylum: Chelicerata
- Class: Arachnida
- Order: Araneae
- Infraorder: Araneomorphae
- Family: Zodariidae
- Genus: Diores
- Species: D. sequax

Binomial name
- Diores sequax Jocqué, 1990

Species of spider

Diores sequax is a species of spider in the family Zodariidae. It is endemic to South Africa.

== Distribution ==
Diores sequax is known only from the type locality at Hluhluwe Nature Reserve in KwaZulu-Natal.

== Habitat ==
The species inhabits the Savanna biome at approximately 119 metres above sea level.

== Description ==
Only the male of Diores sequax is known, with a total length of 2.65 mm. The carapace and chelicerae are yellow, with the carapace having a faint darker triangle in front of the fovea and three striae radiating towards the front. The legs are pale yellow, and the dorsum of the opisthosoma is pale sepia with a very faint yellowish narrow scutum in the anterior half. The female remains unknown.

== Ecology ==
Diores sequax are free-living ground-dwellers that construct the characteristic igloo-shaped retreats typical of the genus Diores.

== Conservation ==
The species is listed as Data Deficient due to lack of distribution data and taxonomic reasons. It is known only from the type locality, and additional sampling is needed to collect females and determine the species' range. It is protected in Hluhluwe Nature Reserve.
