= Diores griswoldorum =

Griswold's Igloo spider

Conservation status
- Least Concern (SANBI Red List)

Scientific classification
- Kingdom: Animalia
- Phylum: Arthropoda
- Subphylum: Chelicerata
- Class: Arachnida
- Order: Araneae
- Infraorder: Araneomorphae
- Family: Zodariidae
- Genus: Diores
- Species: D. griswoldorum

Binomial name
- Diores griswoldorum Jocqué, 1990

Species of spider

Diores griswoldorum is a species of spider in the family Zodariidae. It occurs in southern Africa and is commonly known as Griswold's Igloo spider.

== Distribution ==
Diores griswoldorum is found in Namibia and South Africa. In South Africa, it has been recorded from the Northern Cape province, including Richtersveld National Park, Kgalagadi Transfrontier Park, and Witsand Nature Reserve.

== Habitat ==
The species inhabits the Desert, Savanna, and Succulent Karoo biomes at altitudes ranging from 63 to 1197 metres above sea level.

== Description ==
Only the male of Diores griswoldorum is known, with a total length of 4.59 mm. The carapace and chelicerae are yellowish-orange, while the sternum and legs are pale yellow. The dorsum of the opisthosoma is pale with a pale yellow scutum reaching two-thirds of the abdomen length, flanked on each side by dark sepia stripes. The remainder of the abdomen is pale.

== Ecology ==
Diores griswoldorum are free-living ground-dwellers that construct the characteristic igloo-shaped retreats typical of the genus Diores.

== Conservation ==
The species is listed as Least Concern due to its wide geographical range. It is protected in Richtersveld National Park and Kgalagadi Transfrontier Park.
