= Diores youngai =

Younga's Igloo spider

Conservation status
- Least Concern (SANBI Red List)

Scientific classification
- Kingdom: Animalia
- Phylum: Arthropoda
- Subphylum: Chelicerata
- Class: Arachnida
- Order: Araneae
- Infraorder: Araneomorphae
- Family: Zodariidae
- Genus: Diores
- Species: D. youngai

Binomial name
- Diores youngai Jocqué, 1990

Species of spider

Diores youngai is a species of spider in the family Zodariidae. It is endemic to the Western Cape province of South Africa and is commonly known as Younga's igloo spider.

== Distribution ==
Diores youngai has been sampled from several localities in the Western Cape, including the Hawequas Mountains where it was originally described, as well as Fernkloof Nature Reserve, Table Mountain National Park, and Vergelegen.

== Habitat ==
The species inhabits the Fynbos biome at altitudes ranging from 139 to 814 m above sea level.

== Description ==
Both males and females of Diores youngai have a total length of 3.33 mm. The prosoma is entirely medium brown in both sexes. The opisthosoma is sepia, with the dorsum being pale and having a large dark sepia scutum in males. Females have similar coloration to males.

== Ecology ==
Diores youngai are free-living ground-dwellers that construct igloo-shaped retreats with small stones, characteristic behavior of the genus Diores.

== Conservation ==
The species is listed as Least Concern by the South African National Biodiversity Institute. Despite having a restricted distribution, this species occurs in montane habitats and the majority of its range is protected. It is protected in Fernkloof Nature Reserve and Table Mountain National Park.
