= Diores capensis =

Cape Igloo spider

Conservation status
- Vulnerable (SANBI Red List)

Scientific classification
- Kingdom: Animalia
- Phylum: Arthropoda
- Subphylum: Chelicerata
- Class: Arachnida
- Order: Araneae
- Infraorder: Araneomorphae
- Family: Zodariidae
- Genus: Diores
- Species: D. capensis

Binomial name
- Diores capensis Tucker, 1920

Species of spider

Diores capensis is a species of spider in the family Zodariidae. It is endemic to the Western Cape province of South Africa and is commonly known as the Cape Igloo spider.

== Distribution ==
Diores capensis is known from four localities in the Western Cape: Bergvliet, Cape of Good Hope Nature Reserve at Olifantsbos, Kirstenbosch National Botanical Garden, and Table Mountain National Park.

== Habitat ==
The species inhabits the Fynbos biome at altitudes ranging from 9 to 1069 metres above sea level.

== Description ==
Only males of Diores capensis are known, with a total length of 3.35 mm. The coloration varies between specimens, with some being entirely pale yellow due to bleaching. Better-preserved specimens from Olifantsbos show a brownish-yellow carapace with a dark pattern characterized by two oval patches with paler centers in front of the fovea. The chelicerae are brown with darker patterns, and the opisthosoma is entirely sepia, darker on the scutum and paler on the venter.

== Ecology ==
Diores capensis are free-living ground-dwellers that construct igloo-shaped retreats with small stones, typical behavior for the genus Diores.

== Conservation ==
The species is listed as Vulnerable under criterion B due to its restricted distribution and ongoing habitat loss outside protected areas caused by urban development. It is protected in Table Mountain National Park and Kirstenbosch National Botanical Gardens.
