= Diores simplicior =

Malawi Igloo spider

Conservation status
- Least Concern (SANBI Red List)

Scientific classification
- Kingdom: Animalia
- Phylum: Arthropoda
- Subphylum: Chelicerata
- Class: Arachnida
- Order: Araneae
- Infraorder: Araneomorphae
- Family: Zodariidae
- Genus: Diores
- Species: D. simplicior

Binomial name
- Diores simplicior Jocqué, 1990

Species of spider

Diores simplicior is a species of spider in the family Zodariidae. It occurs in Africa and is commonly known as the Malawi Igloo spider.

== Distribution ==
Diores simplicior is found in Malawi and South Africa. In South Africa, it has been recorded from KwaZulu-Natal where it is protected in uMkhuze Game Reserve within the iSimangaliso Wetland Park.

== Habitat ==
The species inhabits the Savanna biome at altitudes ranging from 36 to 54 metres above sea level.

== Description ==
Both males and females of Diores simplicior have a total length of 3.78 mm. The carapace and chelicerae are yellowish-orange, with the carapace being suffused with black in the eye region and on the clypeus. There is a broad dark patch in front of the fovea with four striae radiating forwards. The sternum is pale yellow. The opisthosoma is dark sepia with a median row of pale blotches, with the posterior ones anastomosing to form a broad line in front of the spinnerets. The inferior part of the sides and venter are pale, except for a dark W-shape in front of the spinnerets.

== Ecology ==
Diores simplicior are free-living ground-dwellers that construct igloo-shaped retreats with small stones, characteristic behavior of the genus Diores.

== Conservation ==
The species is listed as Least Concern due to its wide global range.
