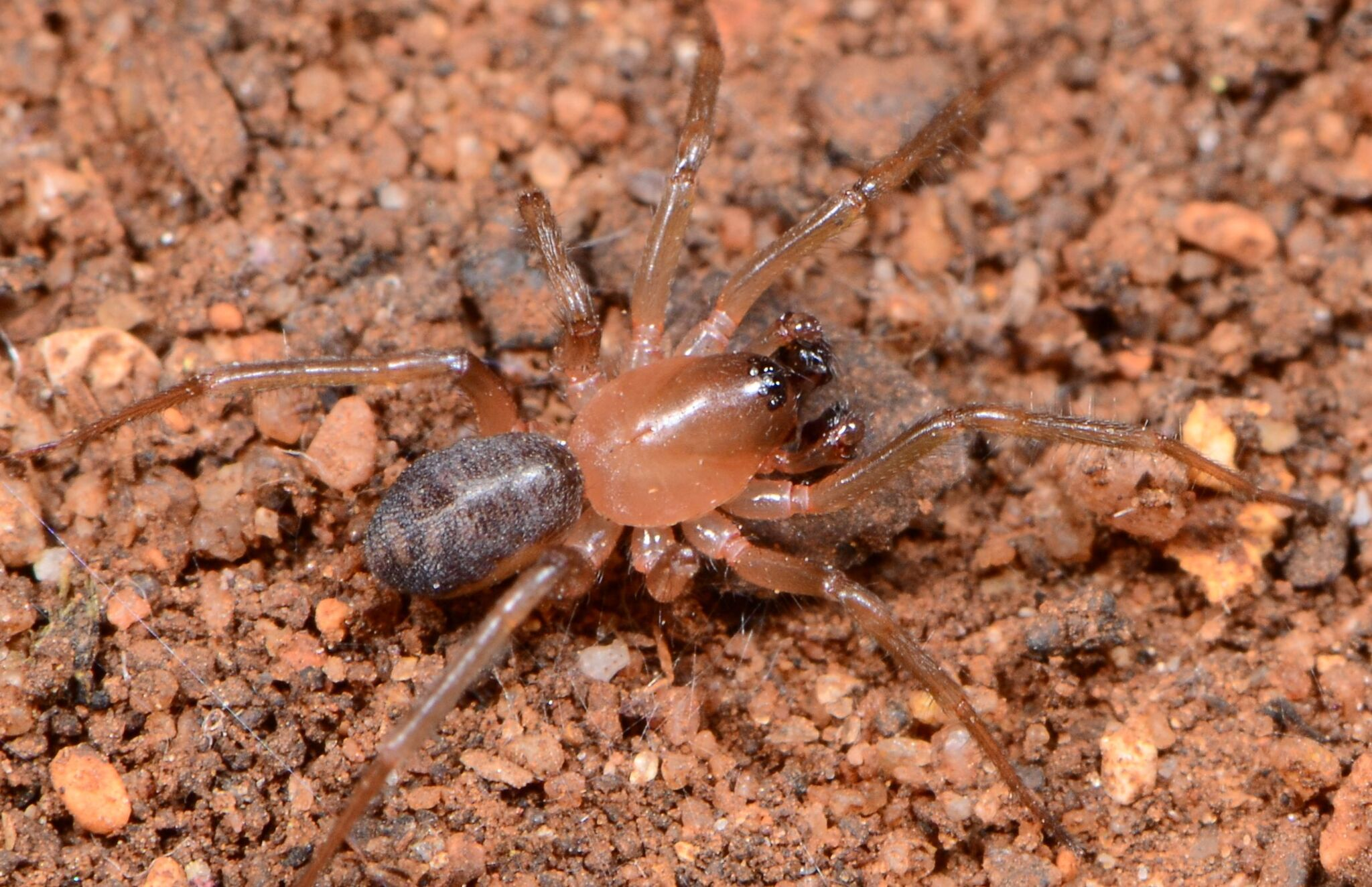
- Male
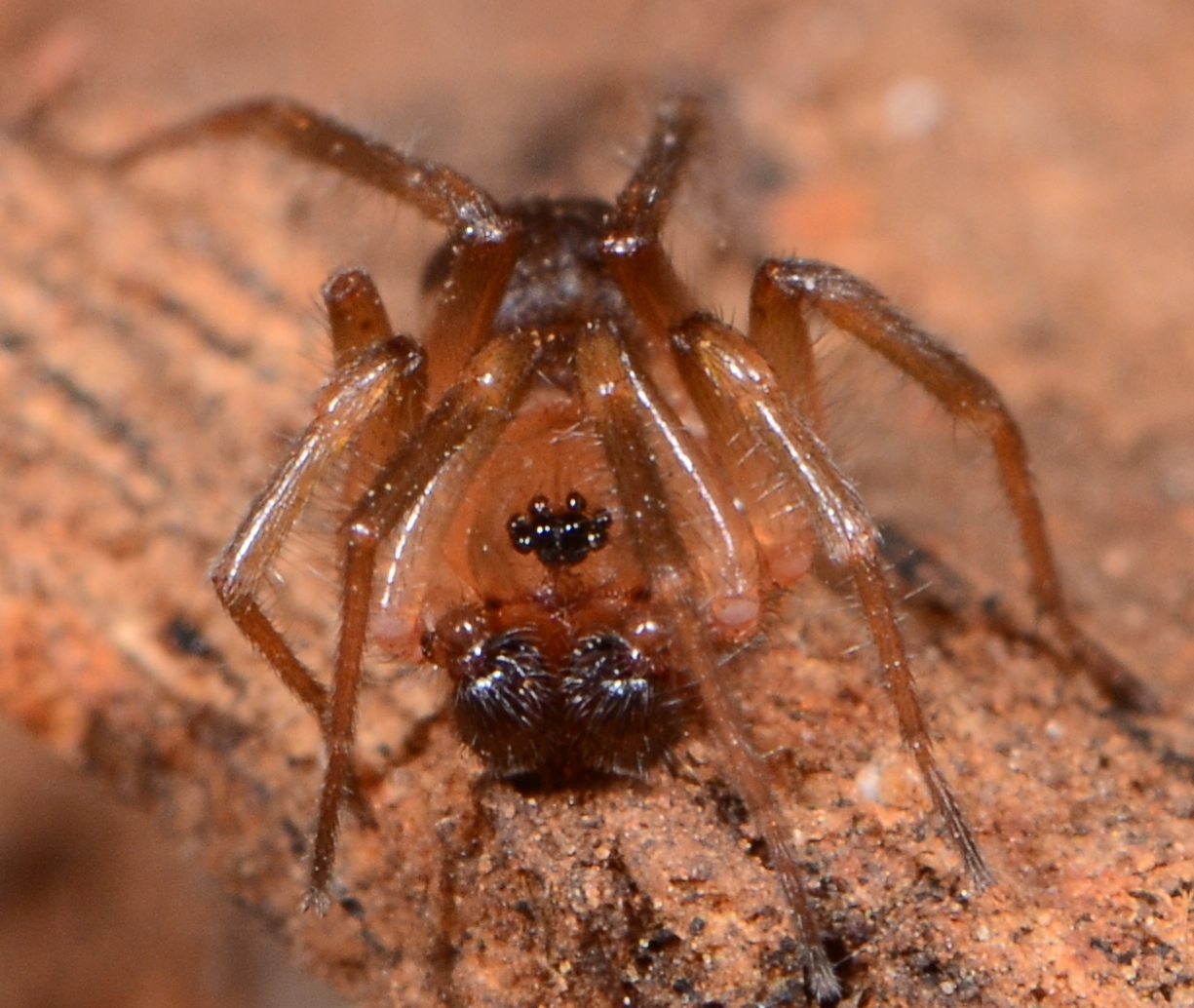
- Male

Scientific classification
- Kingdom: Animalia
- Phylum: Arthropoda
- Subphylum: Chelicerata
- Class: Arachnida
- Order: Araneae
- Infraorder: Araneomorphae
- Family: Zodariidae
- Genus: Diores
- Species: D. pauper

Binomial name
- Diores pauper Jocqué, 1990

= Diores pauper =

Drakensberg Igloo spider

Species of spider

Diores pauper is a species of spider in the family Zodariidae. It is endemic to South Africa and is commonly known as the Drakensberg Igloo spider.

== Distribution ==
Diores pauper has been recorded from three provinces in South Africa: the Eastern Cape, Free State, and KwaZulu-Natal. The species was originally described from Cathedral Peak Forest Station in KwaZulu-Natal.

== Habitat ==
The species inhabits the Grassland, Fynbos, and Thicket biomes at altitudes ranging from 488 to 1646 metres above sea level.

== Description ==
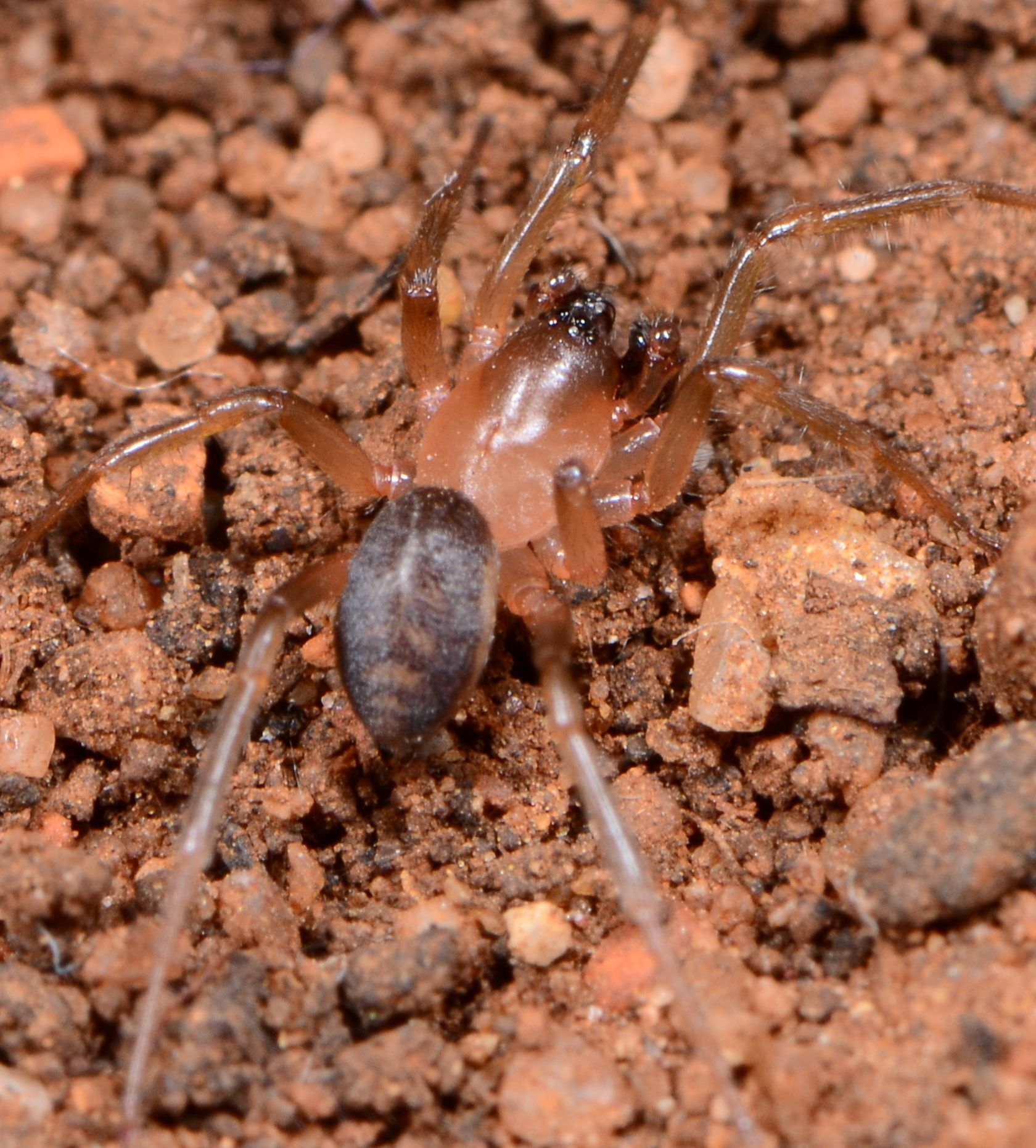
male

Diores pauper is one of the smallest species in the genus Diores. Males have a total length of 2.32 mm, while females measure 2.72 mm. The carapace is orange with a dark spot in front of the fovea and five striae. The chelicerae and legs are yellowish-orange, and the sternum is yellow.

Males have a sepia dorsum on the opisthosoma with a slightly darker scutum in the anterior half and three pale spots united in a line in front of the spinnerets. Females have similar coloration but the dorsum of the abdomen is uniform sepia with only one small pale patch in front of the spinnerets.

== Ecology ==
Diores pauper are free-living ground-dwellers that construct igloo-shaped retreats with small stones, characteristic behavior of the genus Diores.

== Conservation ==
The species is listed as Least Concern due to its wide geographic range. It is protected in Addo Elephant National Park.
