= Diores triangulifer =

Namibia Igloo spider

Conservation status
- Least Concern (SANBI Red List)

Scientific classification
- Kingdom: Animalia
- Phylum: Arthropoda
- Subphylum: Chelicerata
- Class: Arachnida
- Order: Araneae
- Infraorder: Araneomorphae
- Family: Zodariidae
- Genus: Diores
- Species: D. triangulifer

Binomial name
- Diores triangulifer Simon, 1910

Species of spider

Diores triangulifer is a species of spider in the family Zodariidae. It occurs in southern Africa and is commonly known as the Namibia Igloo spider.

== Distribution ==
Diores triangulifer is found in Namibia and South Africa. In South Africa, it has been reported from five provinces and is protected in four protected areas.

== Habitat ==
The species inhabits the Grassland and Savanna biomes at altitudes ranging from 687 to 1722 metres above sea level. It has also been sampled from pistachio orchards.

== Description ==
Females of Diores triangulifer have a total length of 5.03 mm, while males are smaller at 3.50 mm. The carapace is orange in the cephalic area with greyish suffusion, and yellow in the thoracic area. The legs are yellow, and the opisthosoma is dark sepia with five pale triangular patches in a longitudinal line on the posterior half. The sides and venter are pale, sharply contrasting with the dorsum. Males have similar carapace coloration, with yellowish-orange tarsi and metatarsi, and an abdominal dorsum that is dark sepia with a yellow scutum in the middle. The carapace is strongly narrowed in front and shows a slight concavity between the eyes and fovea in profile.

== Ecology ==
Diores triangulifer are free-living ground-dwellers that construct the characteristic igloo-shaped retreats typical of the genus Diores.

== Conservation ==
The species is listed as Least Concern due to its wide geographical range. It has been sampled from five protected areas.
