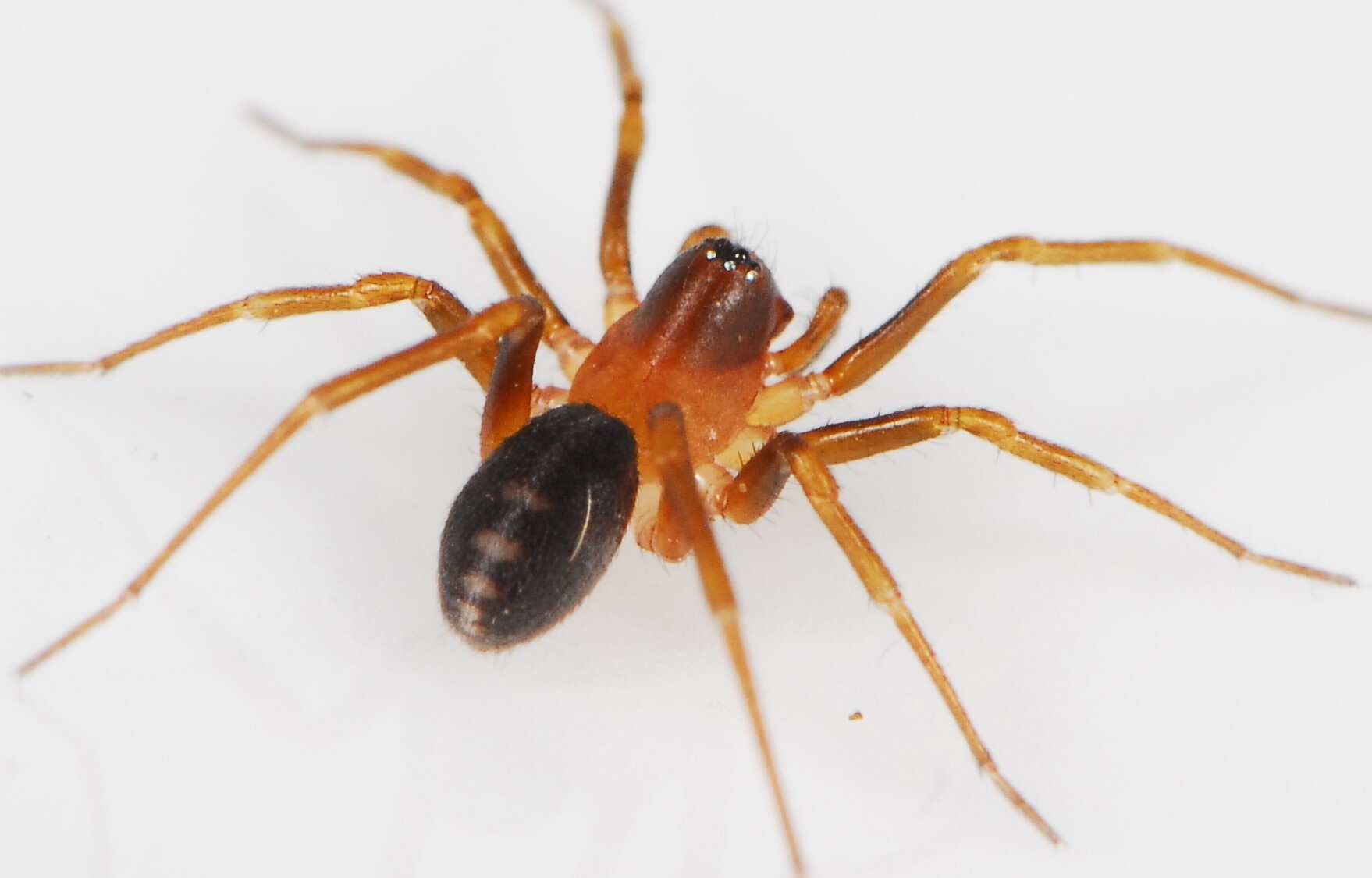
- Female
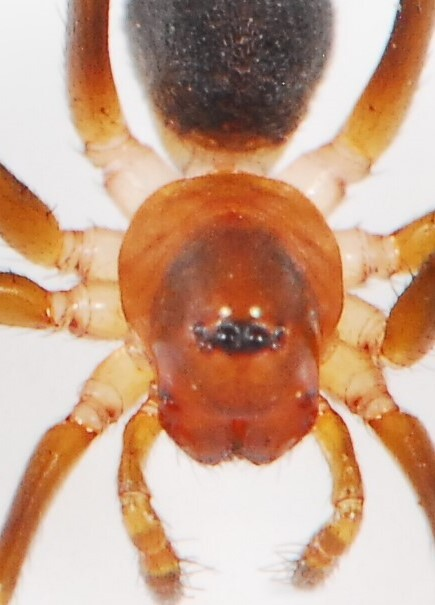
- Female

Scientific classification
- Kingdom: Animalia
- Phylum: Arthropoda
- Subphylum: Chelicerata
- Class: Arachnida
- Order: Araneae
- Infraorder: Araneomorphae
- Family: Zodariidae
- Genus: Diores
- Species: D. triarmatus

Binomial name
- Diores triarmatus Lessert, 1929

= Diores triarmatus =

Congo Igloo spider

Species of spider

Diores triarmatus is a species of spider in the family Zodariidae. It occurs in Africa and is commonly known as the Congo Igloo spider.

== Distribution ==
Diores triarmatus is found in Botswana, Democratic Republic of the Congo, Tanzania, Uganda, South Africa, and Zambia. In South Africa, it has been recorded from three provinces: Gauteng, Limpopo, and Mpumalanga.

== Habitat ==
The species inhabits the Savanna biome at altitudes ranging from 275 to 1124 m above sea level.

== Description ==
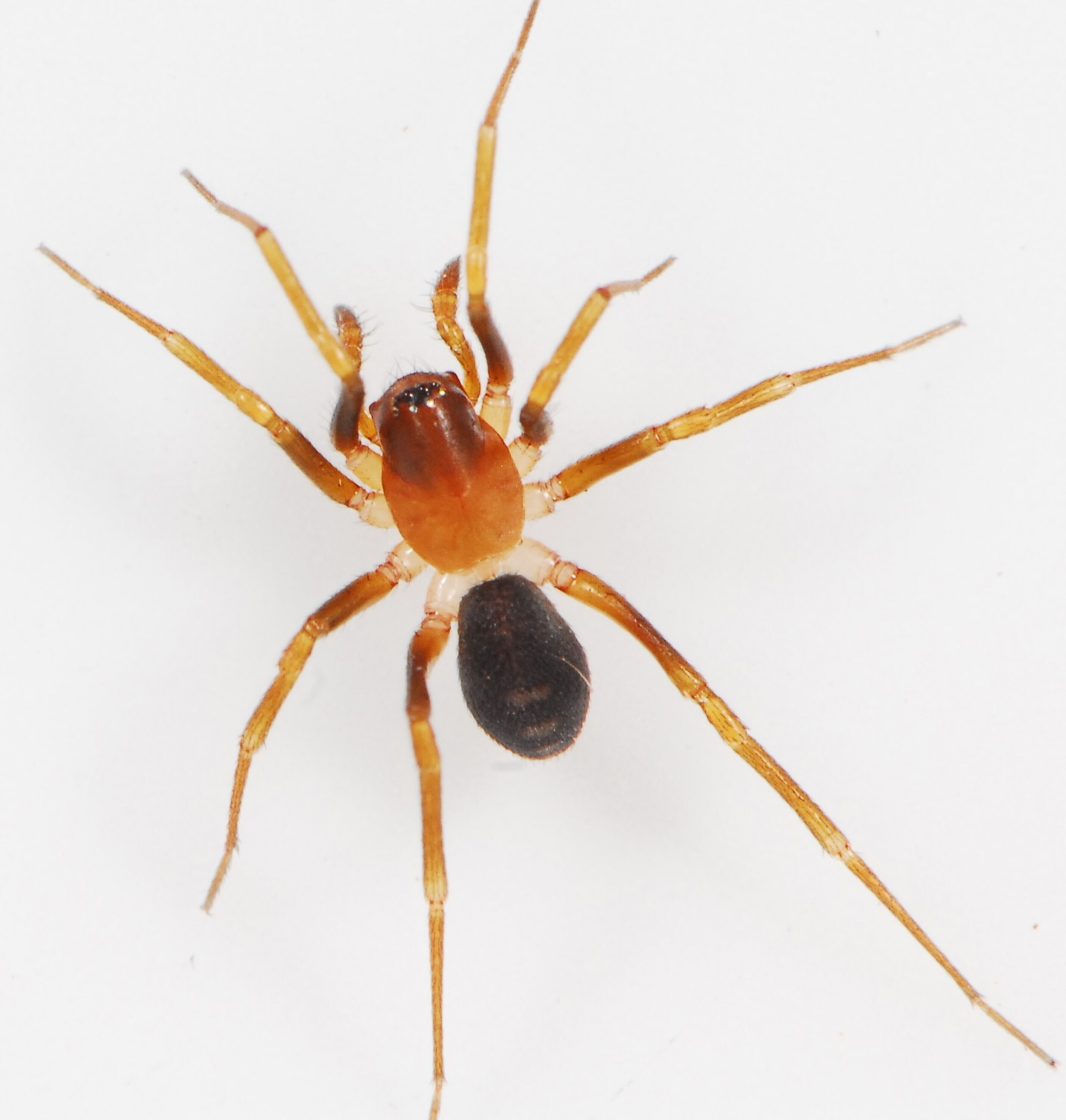
female

Males of Diores triarmatus have a total length of 4.87 mm, while females are larger at 5.62 mm. The carapace, chelicerae, and legs are yellowish-orange, with the sternum being yellow. Males have a dark sepia scutum on the opisthosoma. Females have similar carapace coloration but lack the scutum, instead having a pale dorsal pattern on a dark background. The sides are sepia with an oblique pale patch, and the venter is pale.

== Ecology ==
Diores triarmatus are free-living ground-dwellers that construct igloo-shaped retreats with small stones, characteristic behavior of the genus Diores.

== Conservation ==
The species is listed as Least Concern due to its wide range across Africa. It is protected in Tswaing Nature Reserve, Ben Lavin Nature Reserve, and Kruger National Park.
