= Diores setosus =

Scientific classification
- Kingdom: Animalia
- Phylum: Arthropoda
- Subphylum: Chelicerata
- Class: Arachnida
- Order: Araneae
- Infraorder: Araneomorphae
- Family: Zodariidae
- Genus: Diores
- Species: D. setosus

Binomial name
- Diores setosus Tucker, 1920

Species of spider

Diores setosus is a species of spider in the family Zodariidae. It is endemic to the Western Cape province of South Africa and is commonly known as the Winterhoek igloo spider.

== Distribution ==
Diores setosus is known from two localities in the Western Cape: the Great Winterhoek Mountains where it was originally described, and Matroosberg.

== Habitat ==
The species inhabits the Fynbos biome in montane habitats at approximately 119 m above sea level.

== Description ==
Only the female of Diores setosus is known, with a total length of 4.94 mm. The carapace is light orange in the cephalic area and yellow in the thoracic area. The legs and sternum are yellow, while the chelicerae are orange. The opisthosoma has a sepia dorsum with a series of small chevrons in the posterior half, with the remainder of the abdomen being pale.

== Ecology ==
Diores setosus are free-living ground-dwellers that construct the characteristic igloo-shaped retreats typical of the genus Diores.

== Conservation ==
The species is listed as Rare. Although known from only one sex, it has a restricted distribution and occurs in montane habitats where it faces no threats. Additional sampling is needed to collect males and determine the species' range.
