= Diores femoralis =

Free State Igloo spider

Conservation status
- Least Concern (SANBI Red List)

Scientific classification
- Kingdom: Animalia
- Phylum: Arthropoda
- Subphylum: Chelicerata
- Class: Arachnida
- Order: Araneae
- Infraorder: Araneomorphae
- Family: Zodariidae
- Genus: Diores
- Species: D. femoralis

Binomial name
- Diores femoralis Jocqué, 1990

Species of spider

Diores femoralis is a species of spider in the family Zodariidae. It is endemic to South Africa and is commonly known as the Free State Igloo spider.

== Distribution ==
Diores femoralis has been recorded from three provinces in South Africa: the Free State, Gauteng, and North West. The species was originally described from specimens collected at Farm Lusthof near Edenville in the Free State.

== Habitat ==
The species inhabits the Grassland biome at altitudes ranging from 1291 to 1500 metres above sea level.

== Description ==
Males of Diores femoralis have a total length of 4.55 mm. The carapace, chelicerae, and legs are yellow, while the sternum is pale yellow. The opisthosoma is dark sepia with a narrow pale sepia scutum in front, followed by five short transversal bars. The sides and venter are pale. Females have similar coloration but with a yellowish-orange carapace, chelicerae, and legs, and the abdomen has a sepia dorsum with a row of pale patches, the first two being paired.

== Ecology ==
Diores femoralis are free-living ground-dwellers that construct the characteristic igloo-shaped retreats typical of the genus Diores.

== Conservation ==
The species is listed as Least Concern due to its wide geographical range. It is protected in several protected areas including Amanzi Private Game Reserve, Erfenis Dam Nature Reserve, and Kalkfontein Nature Reserve.
