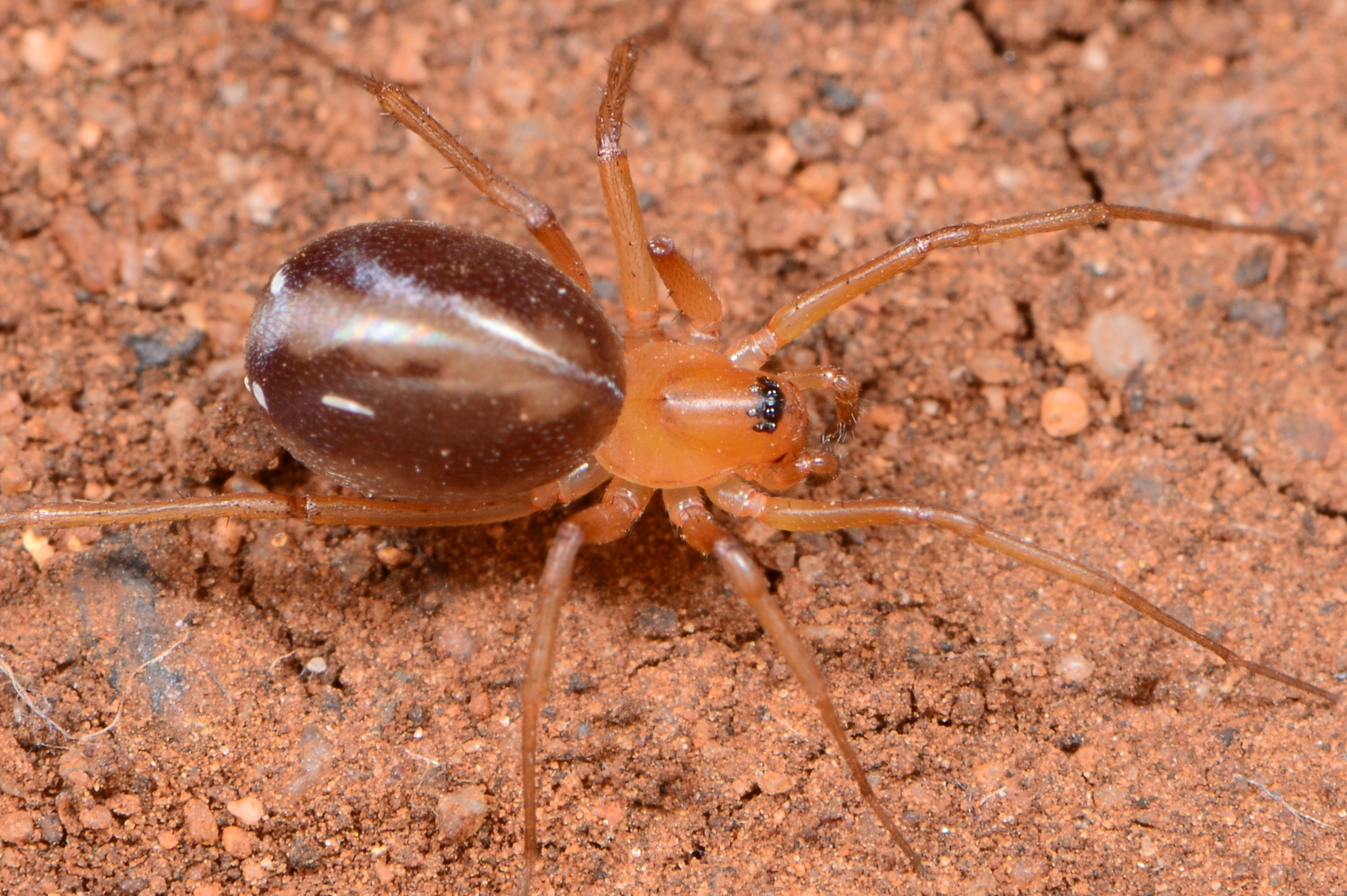
- Female
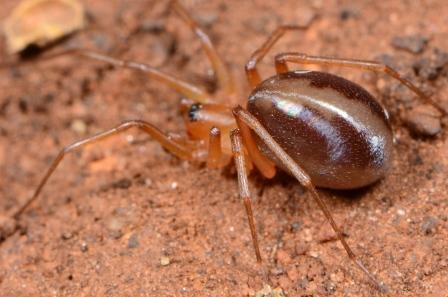
- Female

Scientific classification
- Kingdom: Animalia
- Phylum: Arthropoda
- Subphylum: Chelicerata
- Class: Arachnida
- Order: Araneae
- Infraorder: Araneomorphae
- Family: Zodariidae
- Genus: Diores
- Species: D. poweri

Binomial name
- Diores poweri Tucker, 1920

= Diores poweri =

Power's Igloo Spider

Species of spider

Diores poweri is a species of spider in the family Zodariidae. It occurs in southern Africa and is commonly known as Power's Igloo Spider.

== Distribution ==
Diores poweri is found in Lesotho and South Africa. In South Africa, it has been recorded from seven provinces, making it one of the most widespread species in the genus. The species was originally described from Kimberley in the Northern Cape.

== Habitat ==
The species inhabits the Grassland, Savanna, and Nama Karoo biomes at altitudes ranging from 286 to 1780 metres above sea level.

== Description ==
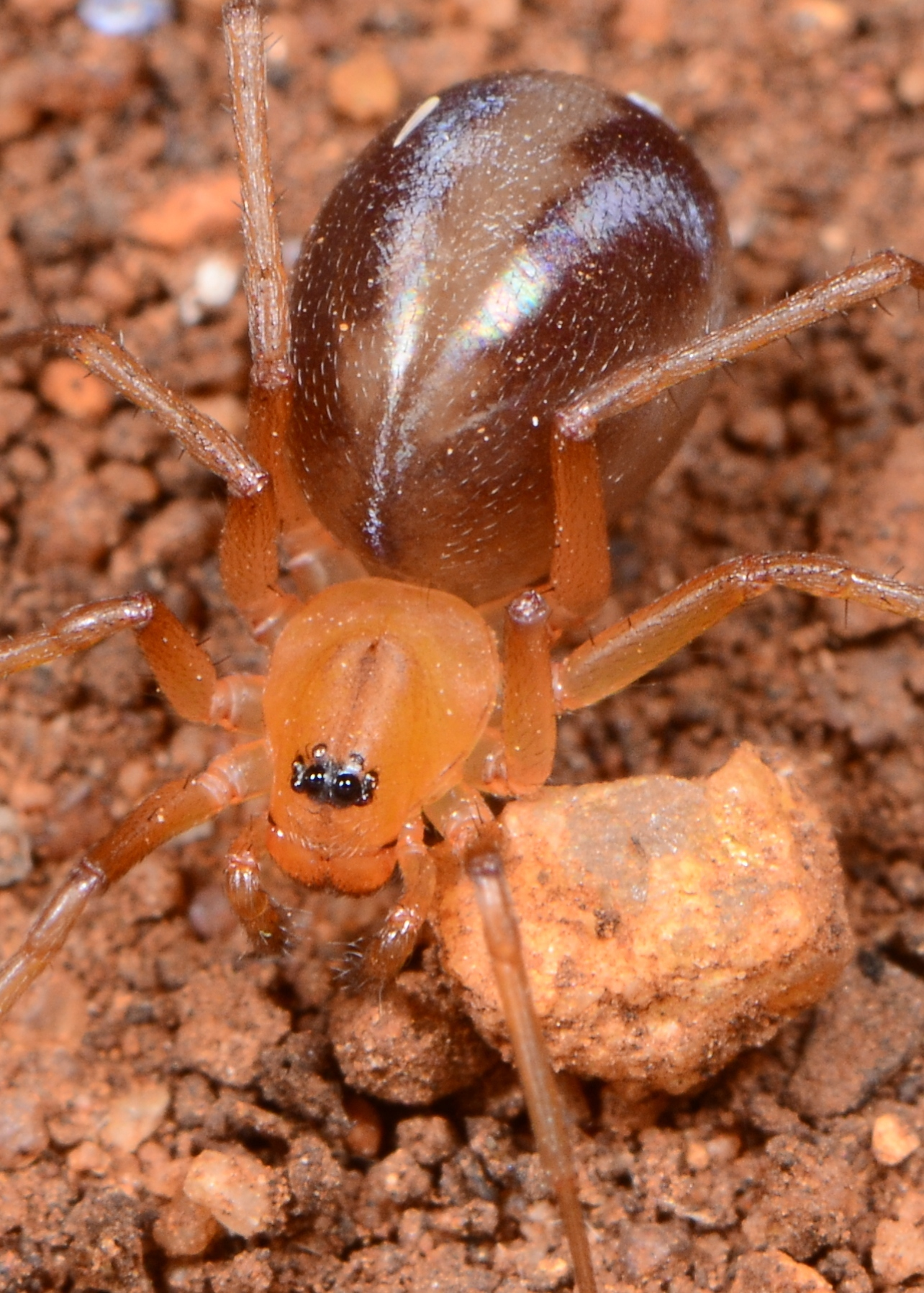
female

Females of Diores poweri have a total length of 4.50 mm, while males measure 4.08 mm. The carapace, sternum, and legs are yellowish, with the anterior median eyes surrounded by black. The chelicerae are light orange. The opisthosoma has a broad pale stripe on a dark sepia background dorsally, with the sides and venter being pale. Males have similar coloration but with an abdominal scutum.

== Ecology ==
Diores poweri are free-living ground-dwellers that construct the characteristic igloo-shaped retreats typical of the genus Diores.

== Conservation ==
The species is listed as Least Concern due to its wide geographical range. It is protected in more than ten protected areas.
