= Diores annetteae =

Annette's Igloo spider

Conservation status
- Least Concern (SANBI Red List)

Scientific classification
- Kingdom: Animalia
- Phylum: Arthropoda
- Subphylum: Chelicerata
- Class: Arachnida
- Order: Araneae
- Infraorder: Araneomorphae
- Family: Zodariidae
- Genus: Diores
- Species: D. annetteae

Binomial name
- Diores annetteae Jocqué, 1990

Species of spider

Diores annetteae is a species of spider in the family Zodariidae. It is endemic to South Africa and is commonly known as Annette's Igloo spider.

== Distribution ==
Diores annetteae is known from three provinces in South Africa: Gauteng, Limpopo, and Mpumalanga. The species was originally described from specimens collected at Rietondale Research Station in Pretoria, Gauteng.

== Habitat ==
The species inhabits the Grassland and Savanna biomes at altitudes ranging from 1052 to 1951 metres above sea level. They are associated with harvester termites and have been sampled using pitfall traps.

== Description ==
Both males and females of Diores annetteae are known to science. Females have a total length of 4.10 mm, while males are smaller at 3.13 mm. The carapace is yellow, becoming paler in the thoracic area. The legs and chelicerae are yellow, and the sternum is pale yellow. The opisthosoma is pale yellowish above with an irregular black pattern in females, while males have a pale yellow scutum in the anterior half of the dorsum.

== Ecology ==
Diores annetteae are free-living ground-dwellers that construct igloo-shaped retreats using small stones, typical of the genus Diores. They are associated with harvester termites and are active nocturnally.

== Conservation ==
The species is listed as Least Concern. While it appears to be undersampled, it is suspected to occur at more locations than currently documented and faces no significant threats.
