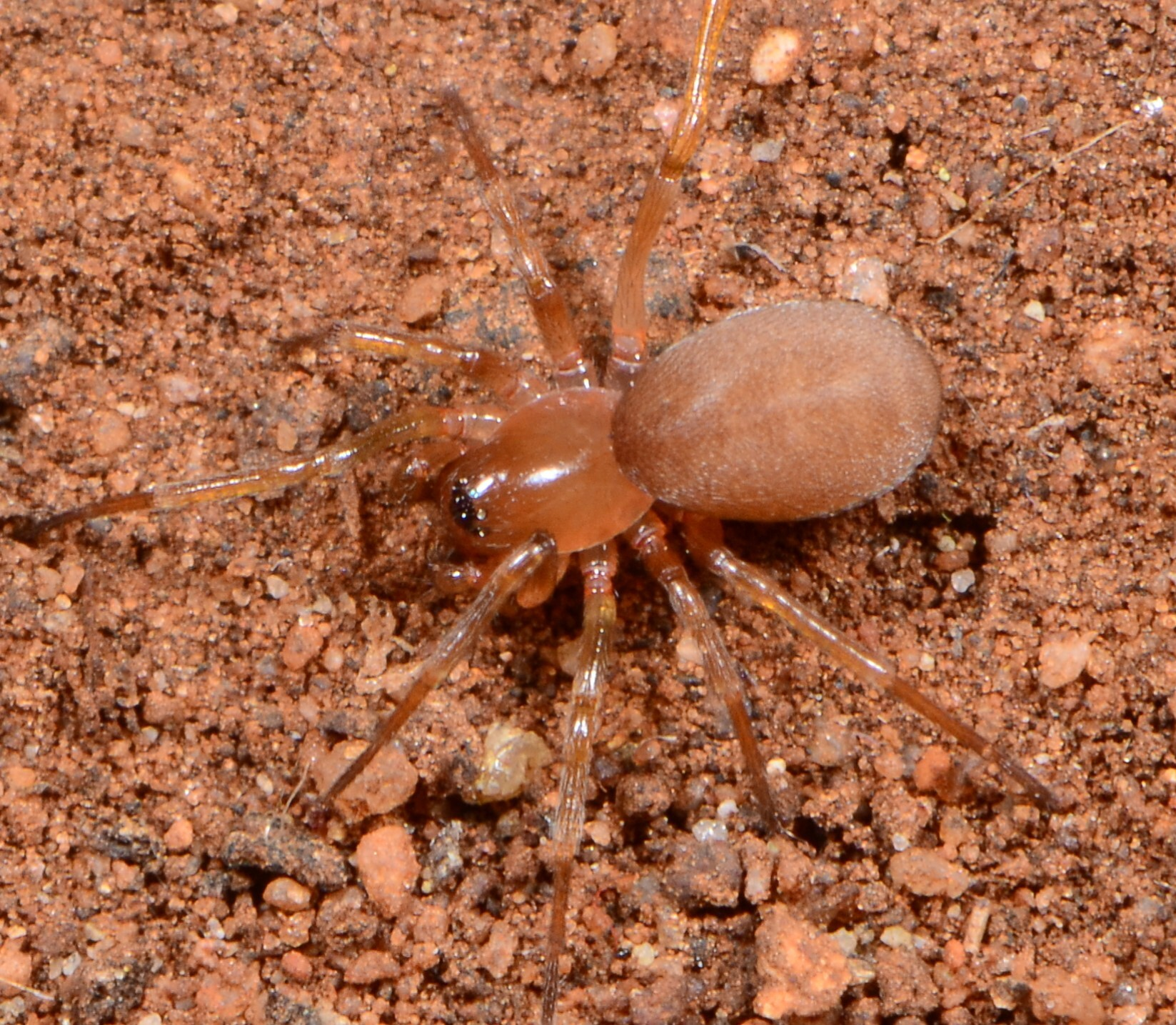
- Male
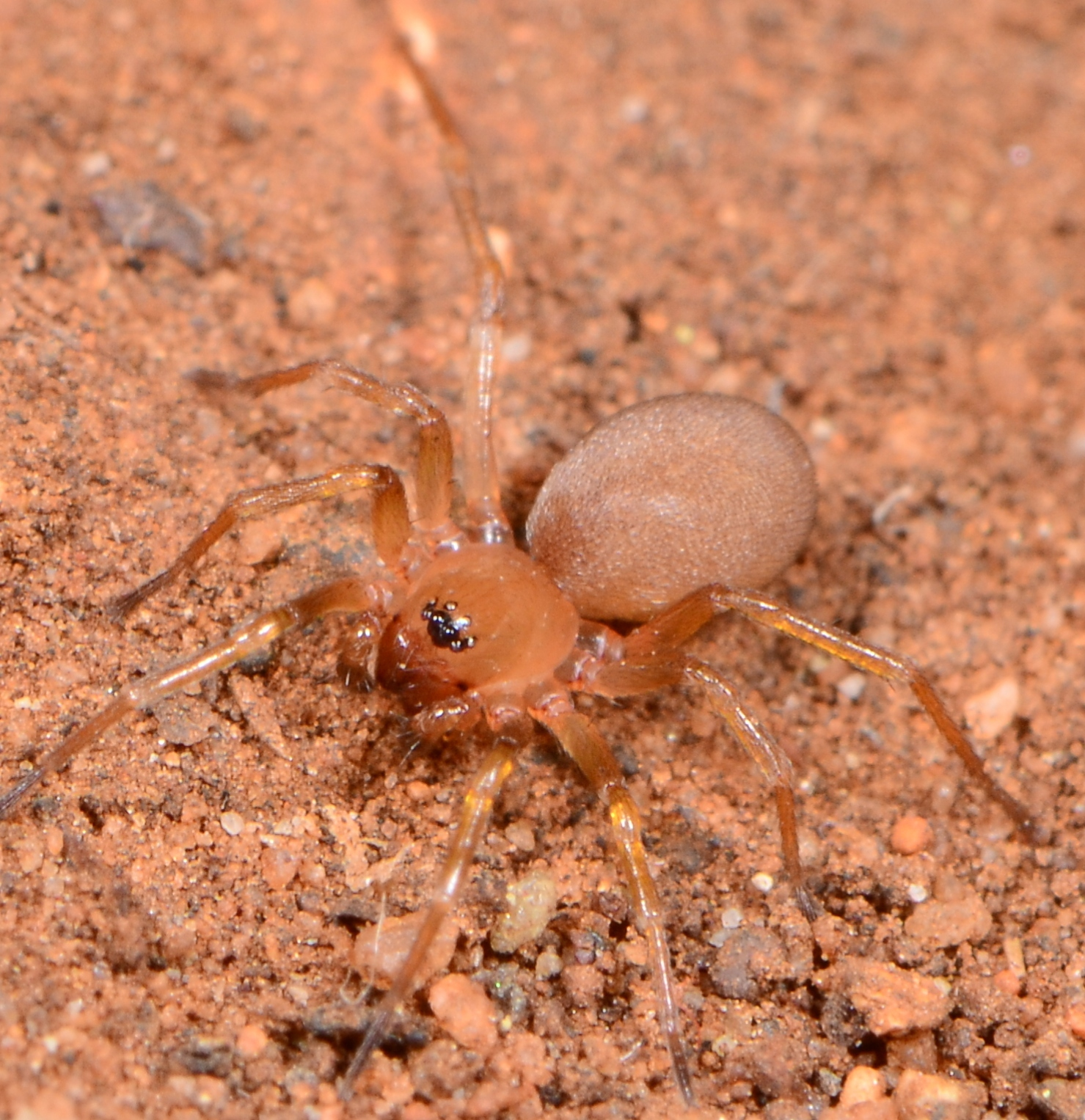
- Male

Scientific classification
- Kingdom: Animalia
- Phylum: Arthropoda
- Subphylum: Chelicerata
- Class: Arachnida
- Order: Araneae
- Infraorder: Araneomorphae
- Family: Zodariidae
- Genus: Diores
- Species: D. russelli

Binomial name
- Diores russelli Jocqué, 1990

= Diores russelli =

Russell's Igloo spider

Species of spider

Diores russelli is a species of spider in the family Zodariidae. It occurs in southern Africa and is commonly known as Russell's Igloo spider.

== Distribution ==
Diores russelli is found in Botswana and South Africa. In South Africa, it has been recorded from the Free State province at Wyndford Guest Farm near Fouriesburg.

== Habitat ==
The species inhabits the Grassland biome at approximately 1601 metres above sea level.

== Description ==
Males of Diores russelli have a total length of 3.17 mm, while females measure 4.29 mm. The carapace is yellow with a black eye field and is slightly suffused with grey on the clypeus. The sternum is pale yellow, and the chelicerae and legs are yellow. The opisthosoma is pale sepia with a pale yellow scutum in the anterior half of the dorsum, followed by two sepia longitudinal bands with sinuous edges. Females have similar coloration but lack the dorsal scutum.

== Ecology ==
Diores russelli are free-living ground-dwellers that construct the characteristic igloo-shaped retreats typical of the genus Diores.

== Conservation ==
The species is listed as Least Concern due to its wide geographical range in southern Africa.
