= Charmides (poem) =

1881 poem by Oscar Wilde

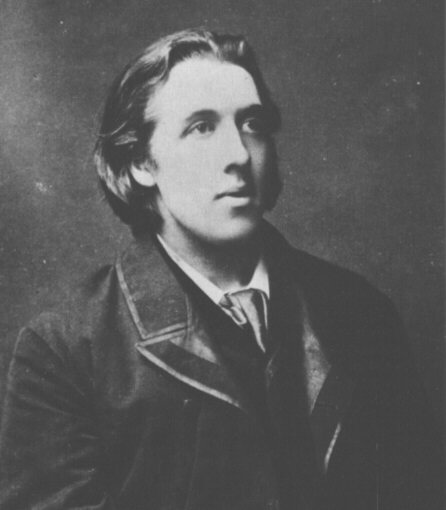
Oscar Wilde in 1881, the year Charmides was published.

Charmides was Oscar Wilde's longest and one of his most controversial poems. It was first published in his 1881 collection Poems. The story is original to Wilde, though it takes some hints from Lucian of Samosata and other ancient writers; it tells a tale of transgressive sexual passion in a mythological setting in ancient Greece. Contemporary reviewers almost unanimously condemned it, but modern assessments vary widely. It has been called "an engaging piece of doggerel", a "comic masterpiece whose shock-value is comparable to that of Manet's Olympia and Le Déjeuner sur l'herbe", and "a Decadent poem par excellence" in which "[t]he illogicality of the plot and its deus-ex-machina resolution render the poem purely decorative". It is arguably the work in which Wilde first found his own poetic voice.

== Synopsis ==
Charmides, a Greek youth, disembarks from the ship which has brought him back from Syracuse, and climbs up to his native village in the Greek mountains where there is a shrine dedicated to Athena. He hides himself and, unnoticed by the priest and local rustics, watches while offerings are made to the goddess, until with nightfall he is left alone. He flings open the temple door to discover the carven image of virginal Athena within; he undresses it, kisses its lips and body, and spends the whole night there, "nor cared at all his passion's will to check". At daybreak he returns to the lowlands and falls asleep by a stream, where most of those who see him mistake him for some woodland god on whose privacy it would be unsafe to intrude. On awaking, Charmides makes his way to the coast and takes ship. Nine days out to sea his ship encounters first a great owl, then the gigantic figure of Athena herself striding across the sea. Charmides cries "I come", and leaps into the sea hoping to reach the goddess, but instead drowns.

Charmides' body is drawn back to Greece by "some good Triton-god" and washed up on a stretch of the Attic shore much haunted by mythological beings. He is discovered by a band of dryads, who all flee in terror except one, who is besotted by the boy's beauty and who thinks him a sleeping sea-deity rather than a three days dead human boy. She dreams of their future life together in majesty under the sea, and renounces the love of a shepherd boy who has been courting her. Fearful of her mistress's anger she repeatedly urges Charmides to awake and take her virginity, but it is too late: the goddess Artemis transfixes the dryad with an arrow. The dead Charmides and dying nymph are discovered by Venus just before the nymph breathes her last. Venus then prays to Proserpine

That she whose beauty made Death amorous
Should beg a guerdon from her pallid Lord,
And let Desire pass across dread Charon's icy ford.

Charmides awakes in the dreary realm of Hades, the Greek underworld, to discover the nymph beside him, and they make love. The poem ends with a celebration of the marvel that this notable sinner could at last find love in a loveless place.

== Publication ==
Charmides was written in late 1878 or early 1879. It first appeared in Wilde's Poems (1881), a single volume published by David Bogue at the author's expense in an edition of 250 copies. Two further editions followed the same year. There were a fourth and fifth edition in 1882, though in these two stanzas were removed, perhaps in response to public reaction; they were not reinstated until Robert Ross's 1908 edition of The Complete Works of Oscar Wilde. In 1892 Wilde, now famous as the author of Lady Windermere's Fan, had his Poems reissued by The Bodley Head as a sumptuous limited edition with a decorative binding and frontispiece by Charles Ricketts. This incarnation of the Poems as an objet d'art in itself is, it has been argued, the ideal setting for the self-consciously Decadent Charmides.

== Metre ==
The metre in which Wilde wrote Charmides is based on that of Shakespeare's Venus and Adonis. Each stanza has six lines rhyming ABABCC, the first five lines being iambic pentameters while the last one is extended to a hexameter.

== Sources ==
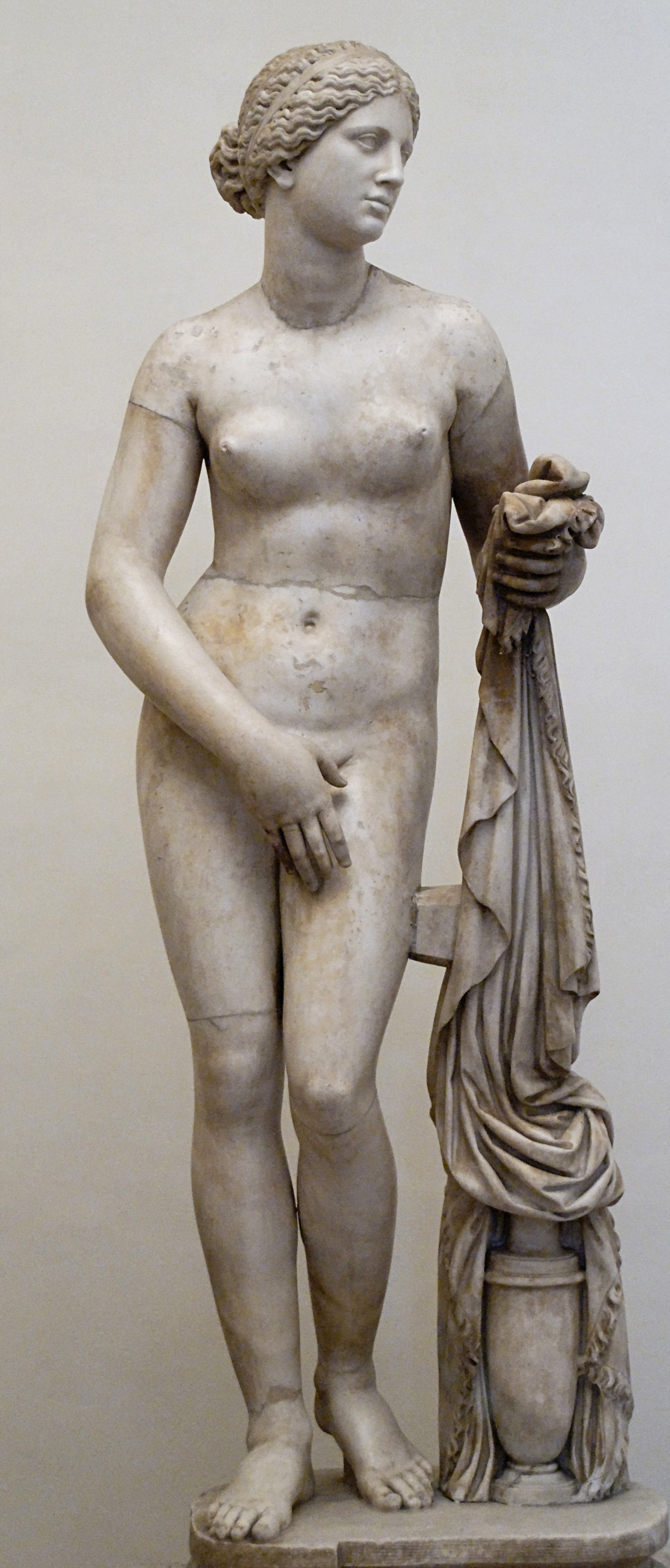
Aphrodite of Knidos, by Praxiteles

The name of Wilde's poem and its hero is identical with that of a young man loved by Socrates and immortalised in Plato's dialogue Charmides. Wilde may have intended the name to be a signal to his readers that the poem is an erotically charged work about a beautiful boy, but there is no other connection between the two works, whether verbal or thematic. The first part of Wilde's story was suggested by an anecdote in Lucian of Samosata's Essays in Portraiture concerning a young man who became obsessed with Praxiteles' statue of Aphrodite and sexually assaulted it, though Wilde made the story still more transgressive by substituting the chaste goddess Athena for Lucian's Aphrodite. He probably also had in mind the words of Walter Pater on the Hellenist Winckelmann, who "fingers those pagan marbles with unsinged hands, with no sense of shame or loss". In the same essay Pater assures us that "Greek religion too has its statues worn with kissing". The second part of the story might have been suggested by a tale in Parthenius of Nicaea's Erotica Pathemata in which the Pisan prince Dimoetes finds and has sex with the body of a beautiful woman washed up on the seashore.

Stylistically, the poem owes a great deal to the influence of Keats; it has, indeed, been called "a Keatsean oasis in the Swinburnean desert" of the 1881 Poems. It can also be seen to draw on the manner of William Morris in The Earthly Paradise and on the more "fleshly" poems, in for example the House of Life sonnet sequence, of Dante Gabriel Rossetti.

Verbal echoes from and allusions to other poets are numerous in Charmides, as in most of the 1881 Poems. Reminiscences of Matthew Arnold's The Forsaken Merman and the Idylls of Theocritus are particularly prominent, but there also possible borrowings from the Odes of Horace, Shakespeare's The Tempest, Keats's "La Belle Dame sans Merci", Longfellow's "The Wreck of the Hesperus", and Swinburne's "A Forsaken Garden".

== Contemporary reception ==
In 1882 Wilde told the San Francisco Examiner that of all his poems Charmides was "the best...the most finished and perfect". It became, however, something of a scandal. Wilde felt obliged to drop the close friendship of his fellow-student Frank Miles on learning that Miles's mother had cut Charmides out of her copy of Poems and that he was no longer welcome under their roof.

Poems was unfavourably reviewed on its first publication, and Charmides was held up for particular vilification as the epitome of everything the critics disliked about Wilde's work. They pounced on it, a contemporary wrote, "with what in less saintly persons than reviewers would have been delight". Even Oscar Browning, a personal friend whom Wilde had asked to review the book, complained in The Academy that "the story, as far as there is one, is most repulsive", and that "Mr Wilde has no magic to veil the hideousness of a sensuality which feeds on statues and dead bodies", while conceding that the poem had "music, beauty, imagination and power". Wilde was said to "greatly exceed the licence which even a past Pagan poet would have permitted himself". Truth spoke of its "hectic immodesty". An anonymous critic in the Cambridge Review detected "a most unpleasant pervading taint of animalism". He admitted that actual indecency in the poem was restricted to the section relating to the statue, and commented sardonically that "with a statue, Mr Wilde and Charmides seem to have thought, some liberties may be taken". American reviews were, if anything, even more contemptuous. For Thomas Wentworth Higginson, in Woman's Journal, Charmides was a poem which could not be read aloud in mixed company. It was, in a word, unmanly – by which he may have meant "ungentlemanly". The Critic called it "beastly", while Quiz: A Fortnightly Journal of Society, Literature, and Art thought it especially surprising that a leading Aesthete should be capable of "the coarseness which can find anything poetical in the conduct of Charmides or the smitten Dryad". Appletons' Journal summed it up as "the most flagrantly offensive poem we remember ever to have read".

Walter Hamilton's critical study The Aesthetic Movement in England (1882) was more balanced than most of the periodical reviews had been. He wrote that Charmides "abounds with both the merits and the faults of Mr Oscar Wilde's style – it is classical, sad, voluptuous, and full of the most exquisitely musical word painting; but it is cloying for its very sweetness – the elaboration of its detail makes it over-luscious".
