= Diores spinulosus =

Scientific classification
- Kingdom: Animalia
- Phylum: Arthropoda
- Subphylum: Chelicerata
- Class: Arachnida
- Order: Araneae
- Infraorder: Araneomorphae
- Family: Zodariidae
- Genus: Diores
- Species: D. spinulosus

Binomial name
- Diores spinulosus Jocqué, 1990

Species of spider

Diores spinulosus is a species of spider in the family Zodariidae. It is endemic to the Eastern Cape province of South Africa.

== Distribution ==
Diores spinulosus is known from two localities in the Eastern Cape: Cradock where it was originally described, and Mountain Zebra National Park.

== Habitat ==
The species inhabits the Grassland and Nama Karoo biomes at altitudes ranging from 881 to 1513 metres above sea level.

== Description ==
Only the female of Diores spinulosus is known, with a total length of 6.36 mm. The species is characterized by an unusually large number of spinules on the legs compared to other members of the genus. The prosoma, including legs, is entirely pale yellow. The opisthosoma is pale with two longitudinal pale grey bands.

== Ecology ==
Diores spinulosus are free-living ground-dwellers that construct igloo-shaped retreats with small stones, characteristic behavior of the genus Diores.

== Conservation ==
The species is listed as Data Deficient due to lack of data and taxonomic reasons. It is undersampled and known only from two localities, with the male remaining unknown. It is protected in Mountain Zebra National Park.
