= Diores lesserti =

Swaziland Igloo spider

Conservation status
- Least Concern (SANBI Red List)

Scientific classification
- Kingdom: Animalia
- Phylum: Arthropoda
- Subphylum: Chelicerata
- Class: Arachnida
- Order: Araneae
- Infraorder: Araneomorphae
- Family: Zodariidae
- Genus: Diores
- Species: D. lesserti

Binomial name
- Diores lesserti Lawrence, 1952

Species of spider

Diores lesserti is a species of spider in the family Zodariidae. It occurs in southern Africa and is commonly known as the Swaziland Igloo spider.

== Distribution ==
Diores lesserti is found in Lesotho, Eswatini (formerly Swaziland), and South Africa. In South Africa, it has been recorded from three provinces: KwaZulu-Natal, Limpopo, and Mpumalanga, with numerous records from Kruger National Park.

== Habitat ==
The species inhabits the Savanna biome at altitudes ranging from 47 to 1131 m above sea level.

== Description ==
Males of Diores lesserti have a total length of 3.70 mm, while females are larger at 5.68 mm. The carapace is orange with a slightly darker margin, the sternum is yellow, and the chelicerae match the carapace coloration. The legs are yellow, and the opisthosoma has a sepia dorsum almost entirely covered by a brownish-yellow scutum in males. Females have similar but slightly darker coloration overall.

== Ecology ==
Diores lesserti are free-living ground-dwellers that construct igloo-shaped retreats with small stones, characteristic behavior of the genus Diores.

== Conservation ==
The species is listed as Least Concern due to its wide geographical range. It is protected in five protected areas, including Blouberg Nature Reserve.
