= Neaera =

Neaera, Neæra, or Neaira are different transliterations of an Ancient Greek name Νέαιρα. They may refer to:

== Ancient Greek feminine name ==
- Neaera (Greek mythology), a name of figures in Greek mythology
- Neaera (wife of Hypsicreon), a figure in Greek legendary history
- Neaira (hetaera), a prostitute in the 4th century BC
- Neaera, the woman to whom Lygdamus addressed his poems (1st century BC); also the object of affection in the Basia ('Kisses') of Johannes Secundus (1541)

== Genera ==
- Neaera (fly), a tachinid fly genus established by Robineau-Desvoidy in 1830
- Neaera, a bivalve genus invalidly established by Griffith & Pidgeon in 1834; now Cuspidaria
- Neaera, a slug moth genus invalidly established by Herrich-Schäffer in 1854; now synonym of Latoia
- Neaera, a plant genus from the amaryllis family established by Salisbury in 1866; now synonym of Clinanthus
- Neaera, an ethmiid moth genus invalidly established by Chambers in 1880; now synonym of Elachista
- Neaira, a true bug genus established by Linnavuori 1973
- Neaera media, a species of moth synonymous with Parasa lepida

== Other uses ==
- Neaera (band), a German metal band
- Neaera Duncan, a character in Russell Hoban's novel Turtle Diary
