= Dimoetes =

Brother of Troezen

In Greek mythology, Dimoetes (Ancient Greek: Διμοίτης, romanized: Dimoítēs) is a brother of Troezen, thus presumably a son of Pelops and Hippodamia. He was married to Evopis, his niece and daughter of Troezen, but she cheated on him with her own brother. Dimoetes' story is preserved in the Sorrows of Love by Parthenius of Nicaea, who attributes it to older author Phylarchus.

== Name ==
In some manuscripts, Dimoetes' name is spelled Thymoetes (Ancient Greek: Θυμοίτης, romanized: Thumoítēs).

== Mythology ==
Dimoetes took his niece Evopis to wife, but the girl kept a secret affair with her brother, with whom she was madly in love with despite being married to Dimoetes. Upon discovering this, Dimoetes was enraged so he reported the matter to Troezen, the girl's father. The shame and disgrace was too great for Evopis to bear. She hung herself, but not before gravely cursing Dimoetes whom she saw as the cause of her misery.

Not much later, Dimoetes found a dead body of an outstandingly beautiful woman washed up on the seashore, tossed about by the waves. The dead woman was so beautiful that Dimoetes was overcome with uncontrollable passion for her. He kept the body so he could have intercourse with it repeatedly for some time. Soon however the corpse began to decay and rot away, and Dimoetes could no longer use it for sex. Long due for a proper burial, Dimoetes finally built a magnificent tomb for the woman and buried her there. Nevertheless he was unable to cope with the loss of his love, so he killed himself at her tomb.

== Background ==
Although Dimoetes is far from the only person to have committed suicide in Greek mythology over lost love—since killing oneself is a common ending for stories of hopeless love, as well as a major theme for many Hellenistic stories Parthenius recorded—he is nevertheless a rare case of a necrophile doing so, having killed himself for a woman he never knew, his grief coming not from loss of a living person, but of a commodity that was no longer available. The tale has also been described as an example of Phylarchus' taste for sensational myths.

== Legacy ==
Dimoetes' myth might have influenced the second part of Oscar Wilde's controversial poem Charmides, in which a dryad nymph discovers the titular protagonist's washed up corpse and immediately falls in love with it, having never met the breathing person he was before his death.

== See also ==
Other suicides over lost love in Greek mythology:

- Pyramus and Thisbe
- Oenone
- Cleite
- Cyanippus
- Kalamos
