= Diores leleupi =

Scientific classification
- Kingdom: Animalia
- Phylum: Arthropoda
- Subphylum: Chelicerata
- Class: Arachnida
- Order: Araneae
- Infraorder: Araneomorphae
- Family: Zodariidae
- Genus: Diores
- Species: D. leleupi

Binomial name
- Diores leleupi Jocqué, 1990

Species of spider

Diores leleupi is a species of spider in the family Zodariidae. It is endemic to the Western Cape province of South Africa and is commonly known as the Cederberg igloo spider.

== Distribution ==
Diores leleupi has been sampled from several localities in the Cederberg Wilderness Area in the Clanwilliam District of the Western Cape.

== Habitat ==
The species inhabits the Fynbos biome in the Cederberg Wilderness Area at altitudes ranging from 78 to 1850 metres above sea level. It has been collected using pitfall traps from various localities and altitudes.

== Description ==
Males of Diores leleupi have a total length of 4.03 mm, while females are larger at 5.22 mm. The prosoma, including legs and chelicerae, is yellow in both sexes. Males have a brownish-yellow dorsal scutum on the opisthosoma, with the remainder of the dorsum being pale sepia and the sides and venter pale. Females have a similar yellow prosoma and legs, with a dorsal pattern on the abdomen.

== Ecology ==
Diores leleupi are free-living ground-dwellers that construct the characteristic igloo-shaped retreats typical of the genus Diores.

== Conservation ==
The species is listed as Rare. This range-restricted species faces no threats and is protected in the Cederberg Wilderness Area.
