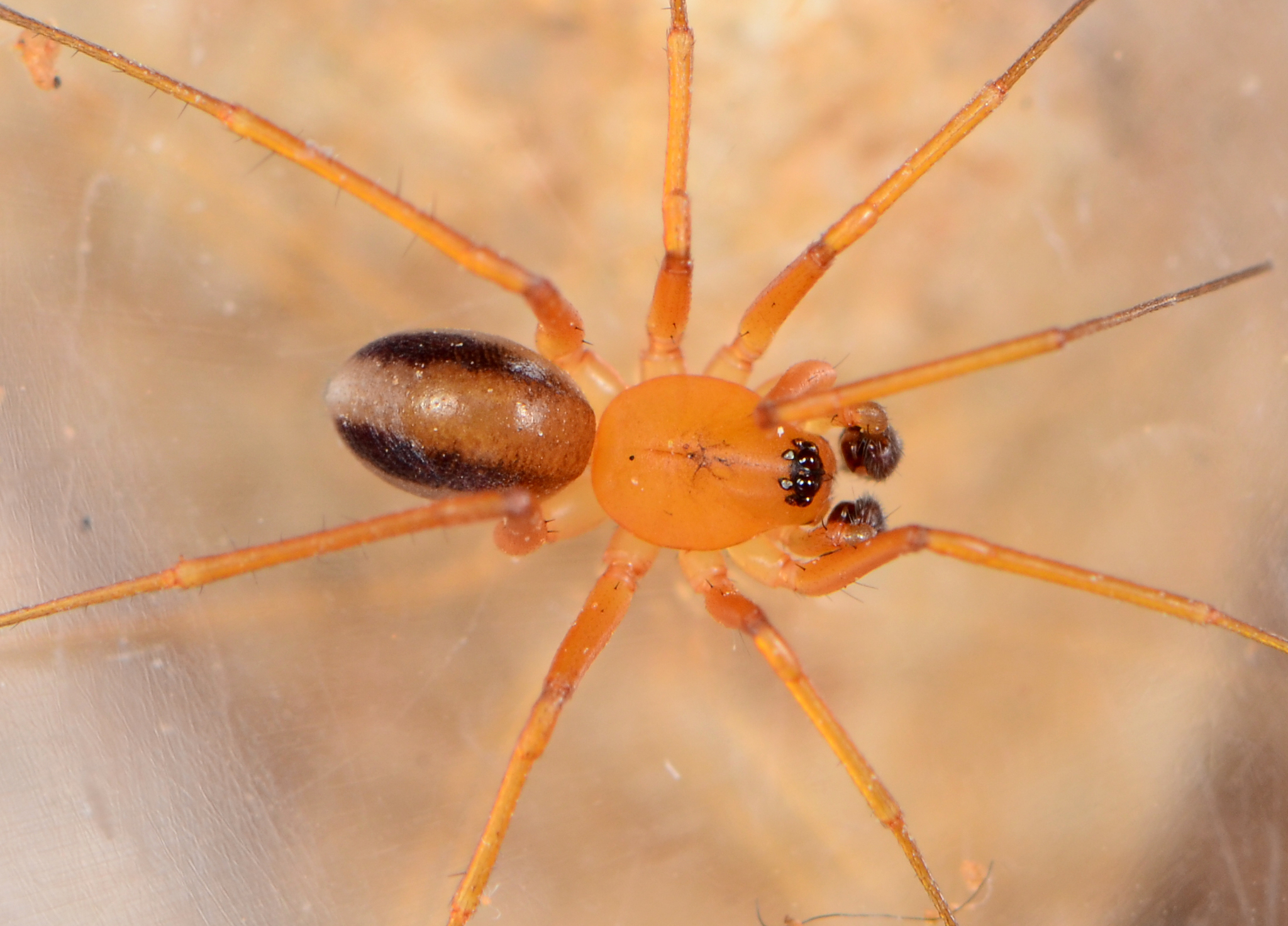
- Male

Scientific classification
- Kingdom: Animalia
- Phylum: Arthropoda
- Subphylum: Chelicerata
- Class: Arachnida
- Order: Araneae
- Infraorder: Araneomorphae
- Family: Zodariidae
- Genus: Diores
- Species: D. bifurcatus

Binomial name
- Diores bifurcatus Tucker, 1920

= Diores bifurcatus =

Winterhoek Igloo spider

Species of spider

Diores bifurcatus is a species of spider in the family Zodariidae. It is endemic to the Western Cape province of South Africa and is commonly known as the Winterhoek Igloo spider.

== Distribution ==
Diores bifurcatus is known from four localities in the Western Cape, including the Great Winterhoek Mountains where it was originally described, as well as Matroosberg, Swartberg Nature Reserve, and Aardvark Nature Reserve.

== Habitat ==
The species inhabits the Fynbos biome in montane environments at altitudes ranging from 588 to 980 m above sea level. It is found in the Cape Fold Mountains region.

== Description ==
Males of Diores bifurcatus have a total length of 4.24 mm, while females are larger at 6.10 mm. The carapace, legs, and opisthosoma are pale yellow. Males have a dorsal scutum flanked on each side by longitudinal dark stripes. Females have similar coloration but lack the abdominal scutum or pattern.

== Ecology ==
Diores bifurcatus are free-living ground-dwellers that construct the characteristic igloo-shaped retreats typical of the genus Diores.

== Conservation ==
The species is listed as Least Concern. Although it has a restricted distribution, this montane species is likely under-collected, and extensive protected habitats are available in the Cape Fold Mountains. It is protected in Swartberg Nature Reserve and Aardvark Nature Reserve.
