= Diores cognatus =

Scientific classification
- Kingdom: Animalia
- Phylum: Arthropoda
- Subphylum: Chelicerata
- Class: Arachnida
- Order: Araneae
- Infraorder: Araneomorphae
- Family: Zodariidae
- Genus: Diores
- Species: D. cognatus

Binomial name
- Diores cognatus O. Pickard-Cambridge, 1904

Species of spider

Diores cognatus is a species of spider in the family Zodariidae. It is endemic to the Western Cape province of South Africa.

== Distribution ==
Diores cognatus is known only from the type locality on the Cape Peninsula.

== Habitat ==
The species inhabits the Fynbos biome.

== Description ==
Only the male of Diores cognatus is known, with a total length of 3.38 mm. The carapace and chelicerae are greyish-yellow, while the sternum and legs are pale yellow. The opisthosoma has a pale sepia brown scutum on a darkened dorsum, with the remainder of the abdomen being pale.

== Ecology ==
Diores cognatus are free-living ground-dwellers that construct igloo-shaped retreats with small stones, characteristic behavior of the genus Diores.

== Conservation ==
The species is listed as Data Deficient due to lack of data and taxonomic reasons. The female remains unknown, and additional sampling is needed to collect females and determine the species' range.
