= Diores jonesi =

Jones' Igloo spider

Conservation status
- Least Concern (SANBI Red List)

Scientific classification
- Kingdom: Animalia
- Phylum: Arthropoda
- Subphylum: Chelicerata
- Class: Arachnida
- Order: Araneae
- Infraorder: Araneomorphae
- Family: Zodariidae
- Genus: Diores
- Species: D. jonesi

Binomial name
- Diores jonesi Tucker, 1920

Species of spider

Diores jonesi is a species of spider in the family Zodariidae. It is endemic to South Africa and is commonly known as Jones' Igloo spider.

== Distribution ==
Diores jonesi has been recorded from KwaZulu-Natal and Limpopo provinces in South Africa. The species was originally described from Mfongosi in KwaZulu-Natal and has also been found in Lekgalameetse Nature Reserve in Limpopo.

== Habitat ==
The species inhabits the Savanna biome at altitudes ranging from 82 to 762 metres above sea level.

== Description ==
Males of Diores jonesi have a total length of 3.69 mm. The type specimens appear bleached, but based on Tucker's original description, the male carapace is dark brown and strongly infuscated. The opisthosoma is purple-black with a black dorsal scutum extending over two-thirds of its length, while the ventral surface is light purple with a pale brown epigastric scutum. Females are similar to males, with a dark purple-black dorsum lacking light spots posteriorly and a pale ventral surface.

== Ecology ==
Diores jonesi are free-living ground-dwellers that construct the characteristic igloo-shaped retreats typical of the genus Diores.

== Conservation ==
The species is listed as Least Concern. Although known from widely disjunct collection localities, extensive areas of natural habitat remain intact within its range. It is protected in Lekgalameetse Nature Reserve.
