= Diores simoni =

Simon's Igloo spider

Conservation status
- Least Concern (SANBI Red List)

Scientific classification
- Kingdom: Animalia
- Phylum: Arthropoda
- Subphylum: Chelicerata
- Class: Arachnida
- Order: Araneae
- Infraorder: Araneomorphae
- Family: Zodariidae
- Genus: Diores
- Species: D. simoni

Binomial name
- Diores simoni O. Pickard-Cambridge, 1904

Synonyms
- Diores vittipes Simon, 1910

Species of spider

Diores simoni is a species of spider in the family Zodariidae. It is endemic to the Western Cape province of South Africa and is commonly known as Simon's Igloo spider.

== Distribution ==
Diores simoni is known from various localities in the Western Cape, including the Cape Peninsula, De Hoop Nature Reserve, and Tsitsikamma National Park.

== Habitat ==
The species inhabits the Forest and Fynbos biomes at altitudes ranging from 15 to 1346 metres above sea level. It has also been collected in pitfall traps from vineyards.

== Description ==
Males of Diores simoni have a total length of 3.28 mm, while females measure 3.98 mm. The carapace and chelicerae are greyish-yellow, while the sternum and legs are pale yellow. The dorsum of the opisthosoma is sepia with a pale brown scutum in the middle in males. Females have similar coloration but the dark dorsal area of the abdomen extends around the spinnerets.

== Ecology ==
Diores simoni are free-living ground-dwellers that construct igloo-shaped retreats with small stones, characteristic behavior of the genus Diores.

== Conservation ==
The species is listed as Least Concern due to its wide geographical range. It is conserved in five protected areas.
