= Diores rectus =

Marble Hall Igloo spider

Conservation status
- Least Concern (SANBI Red List)

Scientific classification
- Kingdom: Animalia
- Phylum: Arthropoda
- Subphylum: Chelicerata
- Class: Arachnida
- Order: Araneae
- Infraorder: Araneomorphae
- Family: Zodariidae
- Genus: Diores
- Species: D. rectus

Binomial name
- Diores rectus Jocqué, 1990

Species of spider

Diores rectus is a species of spider in the family Zodariidae. It occurs in Africa and is commonly known as the Marble Hall Igloo spider.

== Distribution ==
Diores rectus is found in Malawi, South Africa, and Zimbabwe. In South Africa, it has been recorded from three provinces: the Free State, Gauteng, Limpopo, and Mpumalanga. The species was originally described from Farm Wolwekraal near Marble Hall in Mpumalanga.

== Habitat ==
The species inhabits the Grassland and Savanna biomes at altitudes ranging from 241 to 1467 metres above sea level. It has also been sampled from cotton fields.

== Description ==
Males of Diores rectus have a total length of 3.54 mm, while females are larger at 5.46 mm. The prosoma is pale yellow in both sexes. Males have a dark sepia opisthosoma that is purplish in front where there is a faint dorsal scutum, followed by a row of three or four white patches, with the sides and venter being pale. Females have a yellow carapace with a triangular, slightly darkened area in front of the fovea, light orange chelicerae, and the abdomen has a pale patch on a dark sepia background with pale sides and venter.

== Ecology ==
Diores rectus are free-living ground-dwellers that have been sampled using pitfall traps from grassland and savanna environments.

== Conservation ==
The species is listed as Least Concern due to its wide geographical range. It is protected in Suikerbosrand Nature Reserve, Kruger National Park, and Ben Lavin Nature Reserve.
