= Anthippe and Cichyrus =

Youths in Greek mythology

In Greek mythology, Anthippe and Cichyrus (Ancient Greek: Ἀνθίππη καί Κίχυρος, romanized: Anthíppē kaí Kíkhuros) are two youths from the ancient Greek kingdom of Chaonia in Epirus, northwestern Ancient Greece. Their brief and tragic tale, in which Cichyrus accidentally kills Anthippe during hunting and then dies himself, is known through the works of the Greek grammarian Parthenius of Nicaea.

== Mythology ==
In the region of Chaonia in Epirus, a youth of noble birth fell in love with and courted the shy Anthippe, who returned his affections. Soon the two engaged in a secret love affair kept hidden from their parents. During a public Chaonian festival, they retreated and hid in a bush while everyone else was celebrating. As it happened, the king's son, Cichyrus, was hunting a leopard nearby, and the animal hid in the same thicket as them. Cichyrus hurled his spear against it, but was horrified to discover instead of a wounded game, the other boy trying to staunch a dying Anthippe's mortal wound to no avail. In great shock, Cichyrus rode away in a frenzy until he eventually fell off his horse down in a stony and craggy ravine, where he died. The Chaonians honoured their king by erecting a wall right where his body was found, and called the new city Cichyrus, after the unfortunate prince. Nothing is known about what became of Anthippe's unnamed lover.

== Cultural background ==
The story of Anthippe and Cichyrus follows a pattern common in short love stories of the Hellenistic era, in which a woman dies, and the man who was in love with her dies or kills himself in grief, usually due to causing her death in the first place. Anthippe and Cichyrus are an outlier example where the woman and the man are not a couple, and the man does not intentionally die. Other examples of the genre include Pamphilus and Eurydice (the earliest identified example), and Cyanippus and Leucone. Those stories were undoubtedly the sources Roman author Ovid used for his rendition of the Pyramus and Thisbe myth in the Metamorphoses, a story that would eventually inspire William Shakespeare's tragedy Romeo and Juliet.

Anthippe and Cichyrus' tale is one of the twelve etiological narratives in Parthenius' book—that is, a story used to explain an element or fact; in this case, the foundation of Cichyrus. Marc Vandersmissen structured Parthenius' love-aitia into four common stages: first an impossible love occurs, second the person tries to satisfy their passion, third they arrive at a dead end, and finally the consequences of their actions leave a physical or no trace, but he noted that Anthippe's tale defies the rule, as what brings about the third step is not love, but a mistake.

It can be considered an epyllion, a short epic or dactylic poem, particularly of elegiac metre.

== See also ==
- Procris, killed by her husband during hunting
- Actaeon, killed by his own hunting dogs

== Bibliography ==
- Avezzù, Guido (2016). "Classical Paradigms of Tragic Choice in Civic Stories of Love and Death". In Bigliazzi, Silvia; Calvi, Lisanna (eds.). Shakespeare, Romeo and Juliet, and Civic Life: The Boundaries of Civic Space. UK: Routledge. ISBN 978-1-138-83998-4.
- Fantuzzi, Marco (1 October 2006). "Epyllion". In Cancik, Hubert; Schneider, Helmuth (eds.). Brill's New Pauly. Translated by Christine F. Salazar. Florence: Brill Reference Online. ISSN 1574-9347.
- Ellis, Robinson (1896). "A Theory of the Culex". The Classical Review. 10 (4). JSTOR 691239.
- Parthenius of Nicaea, Love Romances, translated into English by Sir Stephen Gaselee (1882–1943), Loeb Classical Library, 1916. Online version at topos text.
- Vandersmissen, Marc (October 2014). "Etiology in Parthenius of Nicaea". Euphrosyne. 42.
