= Leucone =

Thessalian mythological woman

In Greek mythology, Leucone (/ˈljuːkɒni/; Ancient Greek: Λευκώνη, romanized: Leukṓnē, lit. 'white') is a minor figure from Thessaly. She was married to a huntsman named Cyanippus, but he neglected her in favour of hunting in the woods. Leucone followed him one day there, and was attacked and killed by his hunting dogs which mistook her for a wild beast. Her tale is primarily attested in the Sorrows of Love, a work by Roman-era Greek writer Parthenius of Nicaea and other minor scholiasts.

== Family ==
Nothing is known about Leucone's family or homeland, though she might have been from Thessaly, like her husband Cyanippus.

== Mythology ==
According to the tale, Cyanippus begged Leucone's parents for her hand in marriage, and they agreed. The two soon married, but Cyanippus loved to hunt lions and bears in the woods more than anything, and often when he returned home at night he was too tired to even talk to Leucone, or he would spend the night at the forest and not come home at all.

After this had happened many times, Leucone began suspecting that her husband was being unfaithful to her, and was meeting some other woman in the woods instead of hunting. So, one day she dressed up in hunting gear and followed him in secret as he went out to hunt unsuspecting. Cyanippus's extremely savage hunting hounds scented Leucone while he was not around, thought her for some wild animal, and in the absence of their master, attacked and tore her into pieces.

When Cyanippus found her torn body after some time, he was consumed with immense grief, and with the help of his hunting companions he lit up her funeral pyre. As he set her dead body up in the pyre, he slew all of his hounds which had caused her death, and after much weeping for his dead wife he took his own life as well.

== Cultural background ==
The story of Leucone and her husband share elements with a number of tragic love stories of the Hellenistic era where a woman dies and a man in love with her (usually a lover) kills himself in grief, due to causing her death indirectly or blaming himself for it. Similar stories to Leucone and Cyanippus are Pamphilus and Eurydice (which is probably the earliest example), Anthippe and Cichyrus, and finally Pyramus and Thisbe, best known through Ovid, which in turn inspired William Shakespeare's famous tragedy Romeo and Juliet.

== See also ==
- Actaeon, another man who was devoured by his own hunting dogs
- Procris, another woman who followed her husband in fears of infidelity and ended up dead

== Bibliography ==
- Avery, Catherine B., ed. (1962). New Century Classical Handbook. New York, US: Appleton-Century-Crofts.
- Avezzù, Guido (2016). "Classical Paradigms of Tragic Choice in Civic Stories of Love and Death". In Bigliazzi, Silvia; Calvi, Lisanna (eds.). Shakespeare, Romeo and Juliet, and Civic Life: The Boundaries of Civic Space. UK: Routledge. ISBN 978-1-138-83998-4.
- Frey, Alexander (2006). "Cyanippus". In Cancik, Hubert; Schneider, Helmuth (eds.). Brill's New Pauly. Translated by Christine F. Salazar. Basle: Brill Reference Online. doi:10.1163/1574-9347_bnp_e625350.
- Grimal, Pierre (1987). The Dictionary of Classical Mythology. Wiley-Blackwell. ISBN 0-631-13209-0.
- Parthenius of Nicaea, Love Romances, translated by Sir Stephen Gaselee (1882–1943), Loeb Classical Library, 1916. Online version at topos text.
- Plutarch, Moralia, Volume IV: Roman Questions. Greek Questions. Greek and Roman Parallel Stories. On the Fortune of the Romans. On the Fortune or the Virtue of Alexander. Were the Athenians More Famous in War or in Wisdom?, translated by Frank Cole Babbitt. Loeb Classical Library 305. Cambridge, MA: Harvard University Press, 1936.
- Westermann, Anton (1839). Paradoxographoe. London: Harvard College Library.
