= Neaera (wife of Hypsicreon) =

Neaera (/niˈɪərə/; Ancient Greek: Νέαιρα), also Neaira (/niˈaɪrə/), is the main figure in an episode of Greek legendary history recorded by Parthenius of Nicaea, which runs as follows.

Neaera was the wife of a Milesian man, Hypsicreon. When Promedon of Naxos, a very good friend of Hypsicreon, visited him in Miletus, Neaera fell in love with the guest. She could not show her feelings in her husband's presence, but after some time Promedon came to Miletus again while Hypsicreon happened to be away, whereat she decided to take a chance. Neaera came into Promedon's room at night and tried to seduce him, but he would not give in, fearing the wrath of Zeus Xenios (Zeus the patron of xenia). Neara then ordered for the doors of the room to be locked and persisted in her advances, eventually forcing him to satisfy her desires. The following morning Promedon left Miletus, in remorse over having betrayed his friend's hospitality. Neaera followed him to escape imminent punishment by her husband. When Hypsicreon arrived at Naxos in search for her, she took up a suppliant's position at the sacred hearth in Prytaneum. The Naxians refused to deliver her up, suggesting instead that Hypsicreon himself convince her to return. The Milesians declared a war on Naxos over the incident and could have won if not for the stratagem of Polycrite.
