= Polymele (daughter of Aeolus) =

Daughter of Aeolus in Greek mythology

In Greek mythology, Polymele (Ancient Greek: Πολυμήλη, romanized: Polumḗlē), also called Polymela (Ancient Greek: Πολυμήλα, romanized: Polumḗla), is one of the Aeolides, the children of Aeolus, keeper of the winds. Polymele lived with her family on the island of Aeolia, which beheld the wandering hero Odysseus arrive after a long war with Troy. Polymele fell in love with Odysseus and became his lover during his brief stay at Aeolia. This episode is from later works, and does not appear in the Odyssey.

== Mythology ==
According to the Odyssey, Odysseus and his remaining crew arrived at the idyllic island of Aeolia, where Polymele and her family lived happily. They hosted them for a month, during which time Odysseus told them all about his adventures at Troy, where he and many other Greek kings spent ten years fighting the Trojans in order to get the queen of Sparta Helen back. When their stay came at an end, Odysseus received a bag with winds from Aeolus, and sailed away, but when the unleashed winds blew his ships back to Aeolia, Aeolus refused to help him twice and sent him away. According to Homer, Aeolus had twelve children equally divided between males and females, and had wed each of his six sons to one of his six daughters.

According to Parthenius of Nicaea however, during his stay at Aeolia (which he calls Meligunis) Polymele fell in love with Odysseus, and slept with him in secret. When he finally departed, he left her some spoils from the sacked Troy. Aeolus found his daughter weeping bitter tears and guarding aggressively the Trojan loot. Angered at Odysseus, Aeolus took his anger out on his daughter and was about to strike Polymele dead as punishment when Polymele's brother Diores, who was in love with her, interrupted them. Both he and Polymele then begged Aeolus to allow them to marry, to which he agreed.

== See also ==
- Byblis
- Canace
- Myrrha

== Bibliography ==
- Bell, Robert E. (1991). Women of Classical Mythology: A Biographical Dictionary. ABC-Clio. ISBN 9780874365818.
- Homer, The Odyssey with an English Translation by A.T. Murray, Ph.D. in two volumes. Cambridge, MA., Harvard University Press; London, William Heinemann, Ltd. 1919. Online version at the Perseus Digital Library. Greek text available from the same website.
- Parthenius, Love Romances translated by Sir Stephen Gaselee (1882–1943), S. Loeb Classical Library Volume 69. Cambridge, MA. Harvard University Press. 1916. Online version at the Topos Text Project.
- Smith, William (1873). A Dictionary of Greek and Roman Biography and Mythology. London, UK: John Murray, printed by Spottiswoode and Co. Online version at the Perseus.tufts library.
