= Diores recurvatus =

Settlers Igloo spider

Conservation status
- Least Concern (SANBI Red List)

Scientific classification
- Kingdom: Animalia
- Phylum: Arthropoda
- Subphylum: Chelicerata
- Class: Arachnida
- Order: Araneae
- Infraorder: Araneomorphae
- Family: Zodariidae
- Genus: Diores
- Species: D. recurvatus

Binomial name
- Diores recurvatus Jocqué, 1990

Species of spider

Diores recurvatus is a species of spider in the family Zodariidae. It occurs in southern Africa and is commonly known as the Settlers Igloo spider.

== Distribution ==
Diores recurvatus is found in South Africa and Zimbabwe. In South Africa, it has been recorded from five provinces: the Free State, Gauteng, Limpopo, Mpumalanga, and North West. The species was originally described from Settlers in Limpopo province.

== Habitat ==
The species inhabits the Grassland and Savanna biomes at altitudes ranging from 883 to 1758 metres above sea level. It has also been sampled from cotton fields.

== Description ==
Males of Diores recurvatus have a total length of 4.68 mm, while females measure 5.00 mm. The carapace is yellow and slightly orange in the cephalic area, with the sternum being pale yellow. Males have a yellowish-brown scutum on the opisthosoma surrounded by sepia coloration, with the sides and venter being pale. Females have basically similar coloration but are generally darker overall.

== Ecology ==
Diores recurvatus are free-living ground-dwellers that have been sampled from grassland and savanna environments as well as agricultural areas.

== Conservation ==
The species is listed as Least Concern due to its wide geographical range. It has been sampled from eight protected areas, including Nylsvley Nature Reserve, Blouberg Nature Reserve, and Suikerbosrand Nature Reserve.
