= Diores dowsetti =

Dowsett's Igloo spider

Conservation status
- Vulnerable (SANBI Red List)

Scientific classification
- Kingdom: Animalia
- Phylum: Arthropoda
- Subphylum: Chelicerata
- Class: Arachnida
- Order: Araneae
- Infraorder: Araneomorphae
- Family: Zodariidae
- Genus: Diores
- Species: D. dowsetti

Binomial name
- Diores dowsetti Jocqué, 1990

Species of spider

Diores dowsetti is a species of spider in the family Zodariidae. It is endemic to the Western Cape province of South Africa and is commonly known as Dowsett's Igloo spider.

== Distribution ==
Diores dowsetti has been sampled from several localities in the Western Cape, including Ruigtevlei near Sedgefield where it was originally described, as well as various locations in and around Cape Town including Table Mountain National Park and Kirstenbosch National Botanical Garden.

== Habitat ==
The species inhabits both the Fynbos and Forest biomes at altitudes ranging from 47 to 1218 metres above sea level. It has been collected from leaf litter and using pitfall traps.

== Description ==
Males of Diores dowsetti have a total length of 4.12 mm, while females are larger at 5.13 mm. Males have an orange carapace and chelicerae, with the carapace mottled with brown mainly in the cephalic area and on striae, and two paler spots in front of the fovea. The legs are orange and the sternum is yellow. The opisthosoma is dark sepia on the dorsum and pale below. Females have similar coloration but with a yellow undertone instead of orange, and a broad central line on the sepia abdominal dorsum in front of the spinnerets.

== Ecology ==
Diores dowsetti are free-living ground-dwellers associated with fynbos and forest environments.

== Conservation ==
The species is listed as Vulnerable under criterion B due to ongoing habitat loss from coastal housing development. It is protected in Gondwana Private Game Reserve, Table Mountain National Park, and Kirstenbosch National Botanical Garden.
