= Diores auricula =

Zimbabwe Igloo spider

Conservation status
- Least Concern (SANBI Red List)

Scientific classification
- Kingdom: Animalia
- Phylum: Arthropoda
- Subphylum: Chelicerata
- Class: Arachnida
- Order: Araneae
- Infraorder: Araneomorphae
- Family: Zodariidae
- Genus: Diores
- Species: D. auricula

Binomial name
- Diores auricula Tucker, 1920

Species of spider

Diores auricula is a species of spider in the family Zodariidae. It occurs in southern Africa and is commonly known as the Zimbabwe Igloo spider.

== Distribution ==
Diores auricula is found in Zimbabwe and South Africa. In South Africa, it has been recorded from several localities in Limpopo province, including Kruger National Park and various nature reserves.

== Habitat ==
The species inhabits the Savanna biome at altitudes ranging from 238 to 1341 metres above sea level. It has been collected from protected areas including Kruger National Park, Blouberg Nature Reserve, and Malebogo Nature Reserve.

== Description ==
Females of Diores auricula have a total length of 4.60 mm, while males measure 3.77 mm. The carapace is dark yellow with the cephalic part slightly darker. The dorsal surface of the opisthosoma is sepia-colored with a long three-lobed testaceous patch centrally and two broad testaceous spots posteriorly. The venter is pale. Males have similar coloration but the dorsal pattern of the abdomen is usually less well-defined and they lack a scutum.

== Ecology ==
Diores auricula are free-living ground-dwellers that construct igloo-shaped retreats with small stones. They are associated with harvester termites and are nocturnal hunters.

== Conservation ==
The species is listed as Least Concern due to its wide geographical range. It is protected in several nature reserves and national parks.
