= Calchus =

Greek mythological figure

In Greek mythology, Calchus (Ancient Greek: Κάλχος, romanized: Kalkhos) is a king of the Daunians who fell in love with and unsuccessfully courted Circe, the witch-goddess whom Odysseus encountered during his long-lasting journey on his way home. His myth survives only in the works of Parthenius of Nicaea.

== Mythology ==
In a much later myth interpolated during the course of the Odyssey, specifically during the timeframe that Odysseus and his crew stayed at Aeaea, the island of Circe, Calchus fell in love with the sorceress-goddess and employed all possible means of seduction in order to woo her, even offering her the kingship of his realm. But Circe, being in love with Odysseus, rejected him each and every time. But Calchus refused to let go and kept visiting Aeaea, so Circe pulled a trick on him, and invited him over for dinner. Calchus tasted all sort of enchanted food and drink, and was thus transformed into a pig and imprisoned. Later, the Daunians came over to release him. Circe transformed him back into human and set him free, after binding him to swear to never visit her island or woo her in any way again.

== See also ==
- Theophane
- Penelope
- Picus

== Bibliography ==
- Parthenius of Nicaea, Love Romances, translated By Sir Stephen Gaselee (1882-1943), from the Loeb Classical Library edition of Parthenius, Love Romances, published 1916, a work in the public domain.
- Sistakou, Evina (2008). Reconstructing the Epic: Cross-readings of the Trojan Myth in Hellenistic Poetry. Peeters. ISBN 978-90-429-2117-7.
