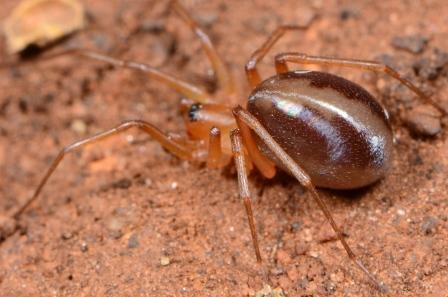
- Female D. poweri
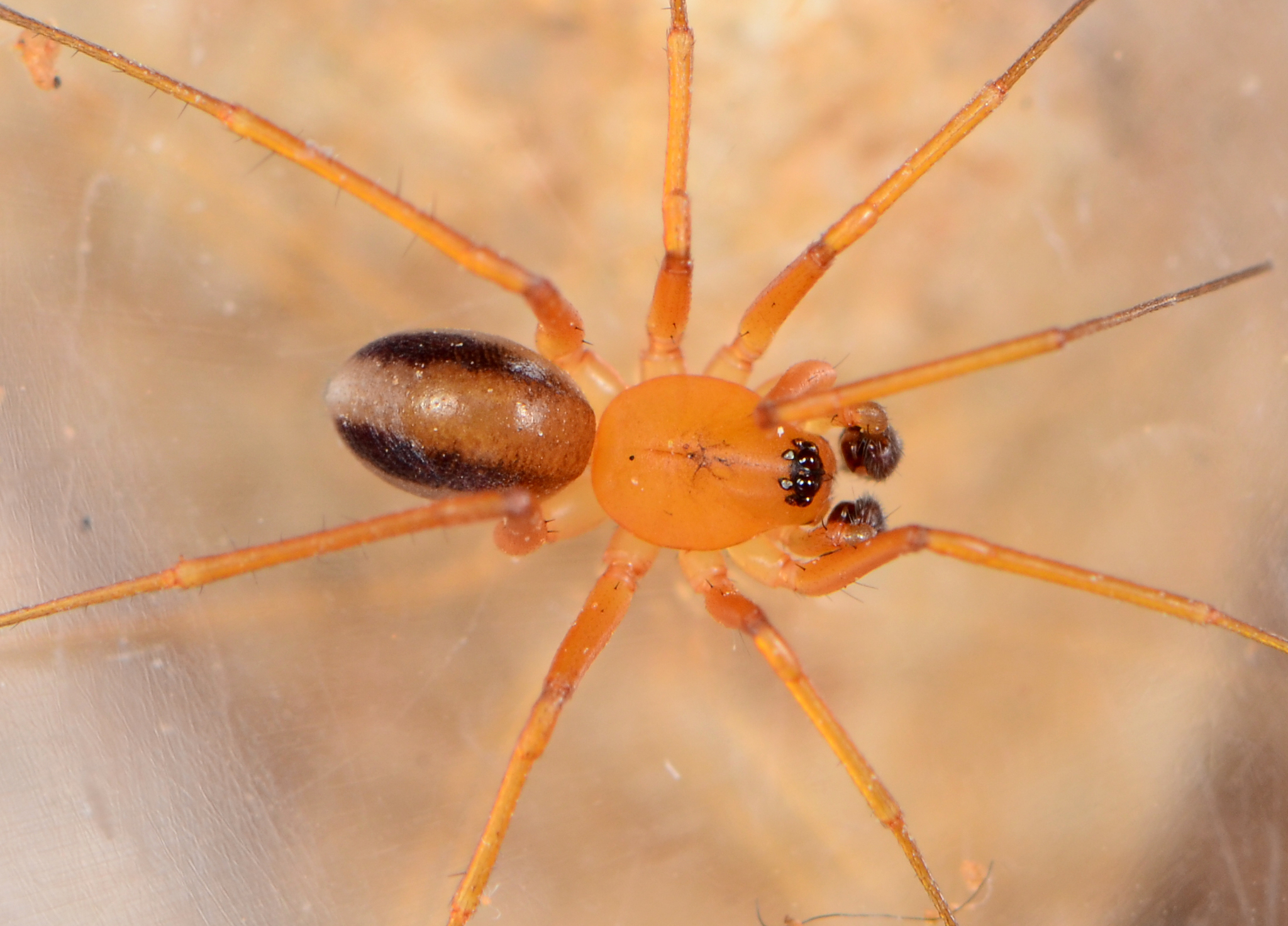
- Male D. bifurcatus

Scientific classification
- Kingdom: Animalia
- Phylum: Arthropoda
- Subphylum: Chelicerata
- Class: Arachnida
- Order: Araneae
- Infraorder: Araneomorphae
- Family: Zodariidae
- Genus: Diores; Simon, 1893

Type species
- D. bivattatus (Simon, 1893)

Diversity
- 60 species

= Diores (spider) =

Igloo Spiders

Genus of spiders

Diores is a genus of spiders in the family Zodariidae. The genus contains 60 species, of which 31 are known from South Africa. Members of this genus are commonly known as Igloo spiders due to their characteristic hemispherical retreats.

== Distribution ==
The genus Diores has an Afrotropical distribution, with species found throughout sub-Saharan Africa. In South Africa, species occur across all provinces, with the highest diversity in the Western Cape and Limpopo.

== Description ==
Members of the genus Diores are small to medium-sized spiders, usually less than 6 mm in length. The carapace is oval and slightly narrower anteriorly, widest between the second and third coxae. The fovea is well developed and the tegument is smooth. They have eight eyes arranged in two rows, with the anterior median eyes being the largest and dark in color. The chelicerae are short and the sternum is longer than wide.

The opisthosoma is typically darker sepia and usually decorated with simple spots or chevrons. It is elongate oval in shape, with males having a narrow scutum anteriorly. The legs have three claws and follow the leg formula 4123. The legs are equipped with spines and spinules, and many species have large glands on the femora.

== Ecology ==
Igloo spiders are agile, nocturnal, wandering ground-dwellers. Most species prey on ants, but a few specialize in hunting termites, such as Diores termitophagus. In the early morning, they construct small, hemispherical, igloo-shaped retreats made of small stones bound together with silk. Some species construct a new retreat every day.

Most species possess large glands on the femora. These femoral glands play an intraspecific role, functioning to prevent the spiders from attacking each other during encounters.

== Habitat ==
Diores species inhabit a wide range of biomes in South Africa, including Fynbos, Grassland, Savanna, Desert, Succulent Karoo, Nama Karoo, Forest, and Thicket biomes. They are found from sea level to over 2000 m elevation.

== Conservation ==
Conservation statuses of Diores species in South Africa range from Least Concern to Vulnerable, with several species listed as Data Deficient due to limited distribution data or unknown sexes. Several species are of conservation concern due to habitat loss from urban development and agricultural expansion.

== Taxonomy ==
The genus name Diores was established by Eugène Simon in 1893, with Diores bivattatus designated as the type species.

The genus was revised by Jocqué in 1990, who provided detailed morphological descriptions and established the current taxonomic framework. Subsequent taxonomic work has continued to discover new species and clarify relationships within the genus.

== Species ==
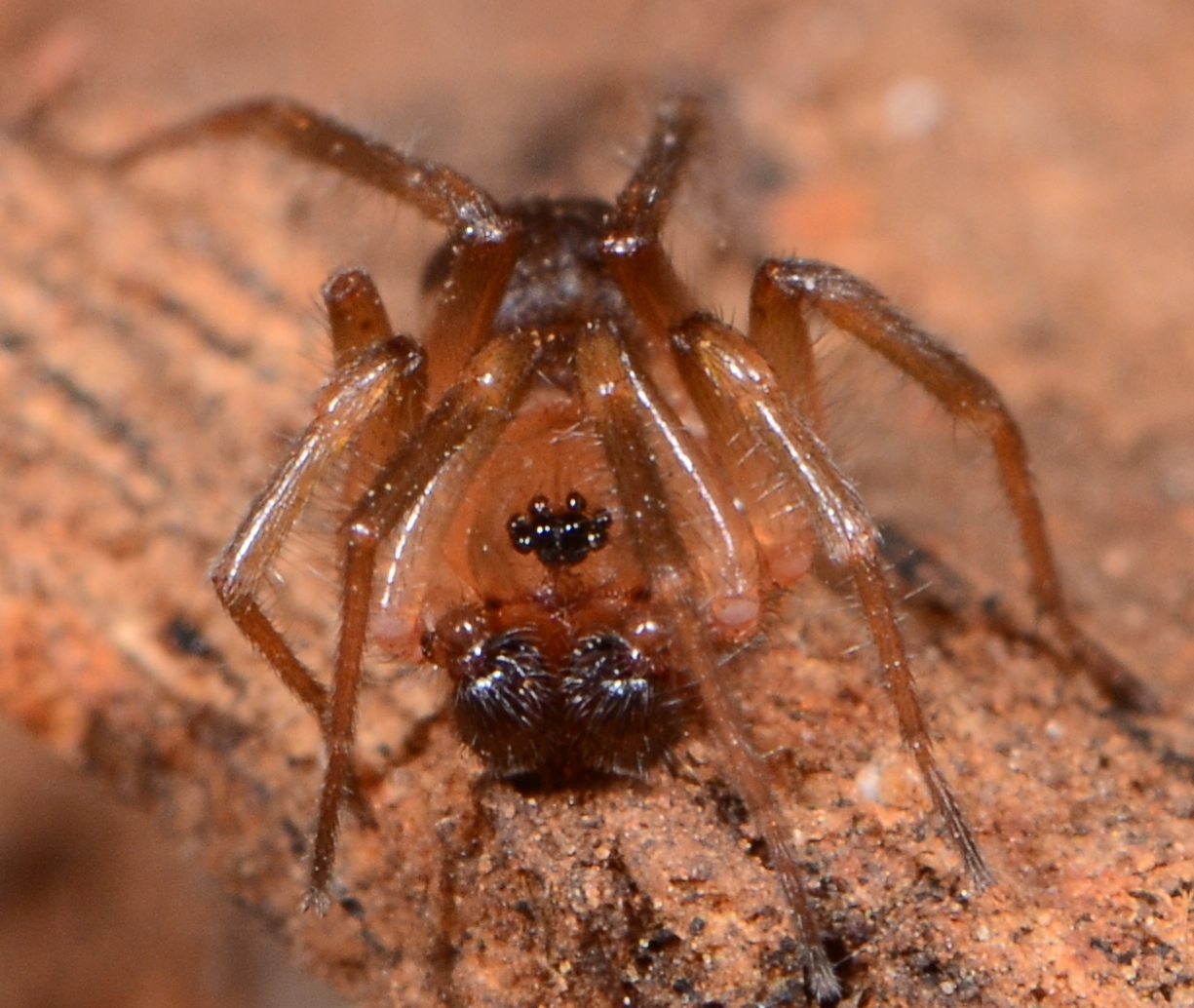
male D. pauper

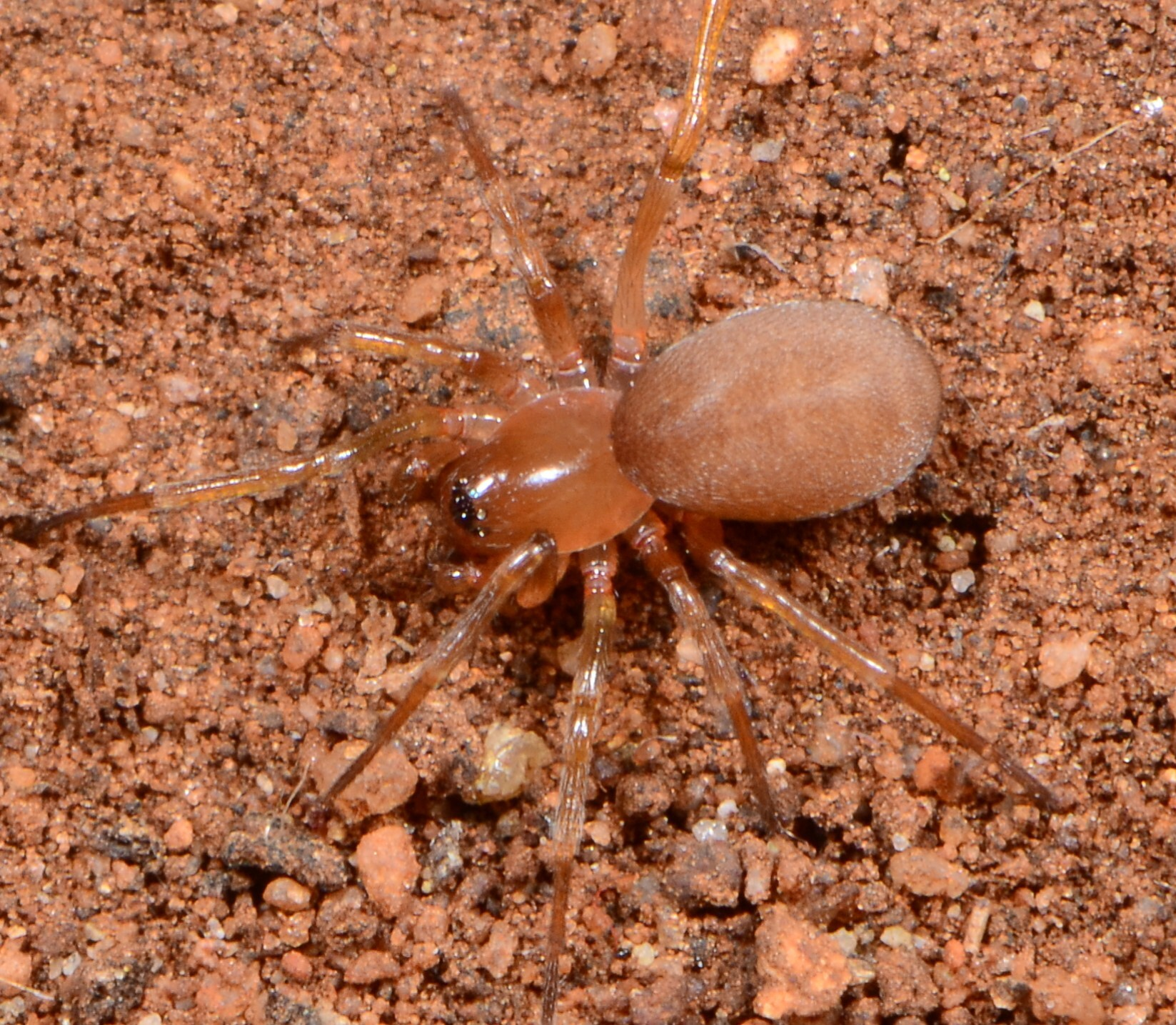
male D. russelli

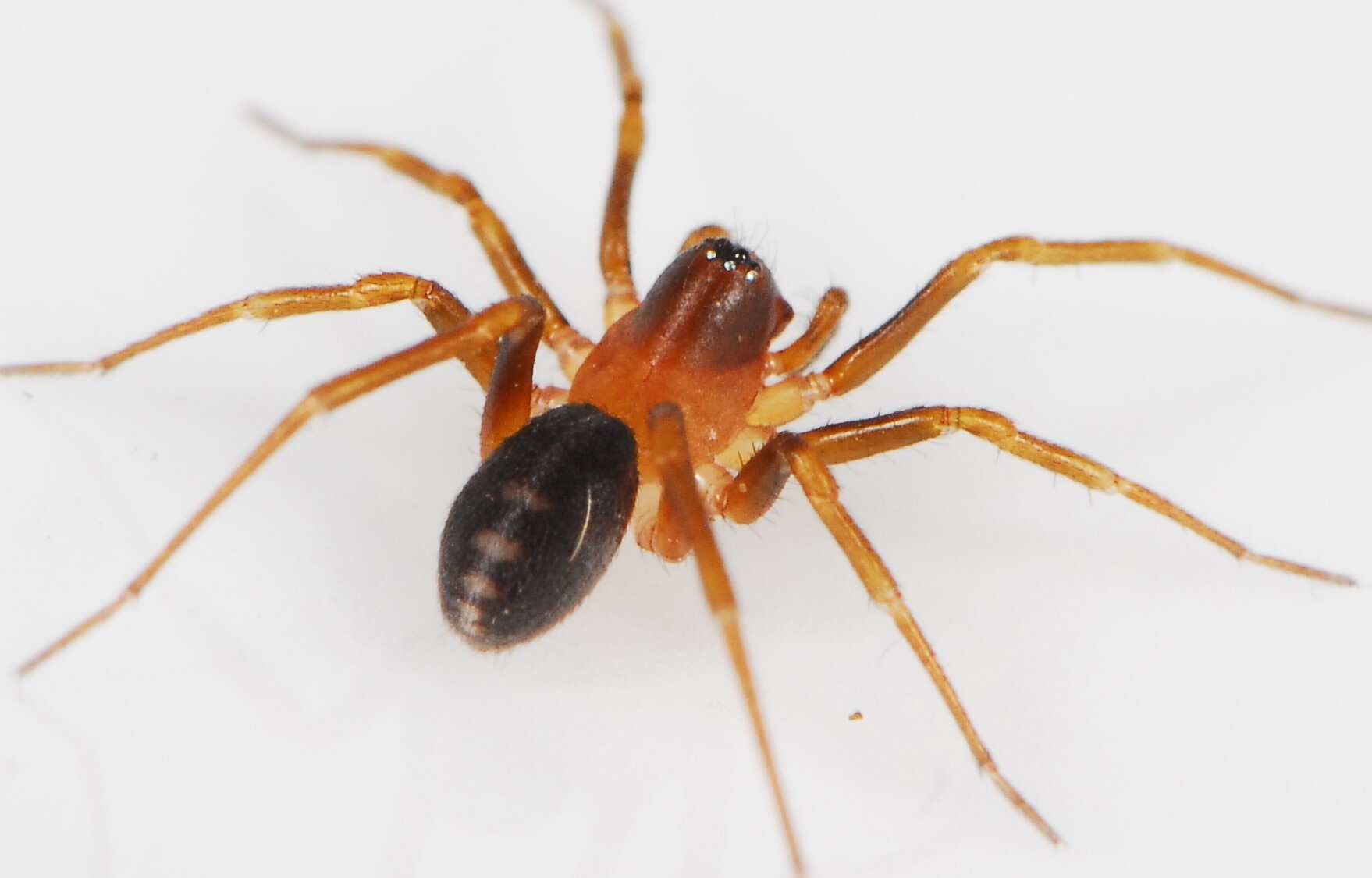
female D. triarmatus

As of September 2025, the World Spider Catalog accepted the following extant species:

- Diores annetteae Jocqué, 1990 – South Africa
- Diores anomalus Jocqué, 1990 – Madagascar
- Diores auricula Tucker, 1920 – Zimbabwe, South Africa
- Diores bifurcatus Tucker, 1920 – South Africa
- Diores bivattatus Simon, 1893 (type) – South Africa
- Diores bouilloni Benoit, 1965 – Congo
- Diores brevis Jocqué, 1990 – Kenya
- Diores capensis Tucker, 1920 – South Africa
- Diores chelinda Jocqué, 1990 – Malawi
- Diores cognatus O. Pickard-Cambridge, 1904 – South Africa
- Diores damara Jocqué, 1990 – Namibia
- Diores decipiens Jocqué, 1990 – South Africa
- Diores delesserti Caporiacco, 1949 – Kenya
- Diores delicatulus Lawrence, 1936 – Botswana, Zimbabwe
- Diores dowsetti Jocqué, 1990 – South Africa
- Diores druryi Tucker, 1920 – Namibia
- Diores femoralis Jocqué, 1990 – South Africa
- Diores filomenae Jocqué, 2003 – Comoros
- Diores geraerti Jocqué, 1990 – Cameroon, Congo
- Diores godfreyi Hewitt, 1919 – South Africa
- Diores griswoldorum Jocqué, 1990 – Namibia
- Diores immaculatus Tullgren, 1910 – Tanzania
- Diores initialis Jocqué, 1990 – Kenya, Tanzania
- Diores jonesi Tucker, 1920 – South Africa
- Diores kenyae Berland, 1920 – Kenya
- Diores kibonotensis Tullgren, 1910 – Tanzania
- Diores leleupi Jocqué, 1990 – South Africa
- Diores lemaireae Jocqué, 1990 – Malawi
- Diores lesserti Lawrence, 1952 – South Africa, Lesotho
- Diores magicus Jocqué & Dippenaar-Schoeman, 1992 – Zimbabwe
- Diores malaissei Jocqué, 1990 – Congo
- Diores milloti Jocqué, 1990 – Madagascar
- Diores miombo Jocqué, 1990 – Malawi
- Diores monospinus Jocqué, 1990 – Malawi
- Diores murphyorum Jocqué, 1990 – Kenya, Tanzania
- Diores naivashae Berland, 1920 – Kenya
- Diores namibia Jocqué, 1990 – Namibia
- Diores patellaris Jocqué, 1990 – Malawi
- Diores pauper Jocqué, 1990 – South Africa
- Diores poweri Tucker, 1920 – South Africa, Lesotho
- Diores radulifer Simon, 1910 – South Africa
- Diores rectus Jocqué, 1990 – Malawi, South Africa
- Diores recurvatus Jocqué, 1990 – South Africa
- Diores russelli Jocqué, 1990 – Botswana
- Diores salisburyensis Tucker, 1920 – Namibia, Botswana, Zimbabwe, Zambia
- Diores seiugatus Jocqué, 1986 – Comoros
- Diores sequax Jocqué, 1990 – South Africa
- Diores setosus Tucker, 1920 – South Africa
- Diores silvestris Jocqué, 1990 – South Africa
- Diores similis Russell-Smith & Jocqué, 2015 – Tanzania
- Diores simoni O. Pickard-Cambridge, 1904 – South Africa
- Diores simplicior Jocqué, 1990 – Malawi
- Diores spinulosus Jocqué, 1990 – South Africa
- Diores strandi Caporiacco, 1949 – Kenya, Rwanda, Congo
- Diores tavetae Berland, 1920 – Kenya
- Diores termitophagus Jocqué & Dippenaar-Schoeman, 1992 – South Africa
- Diores triangulifer Simon, 1910 – Namibia, South Africa
- Diores triarmatus Lessert, 1929 – Congo
- Diores univittatus Tullgren, 1910 – Tanzania
- Diores youngai Jocqué, 1990 – South Africa
