= Diores termitophagus =

Scientific classification
- Kingdom: Animalia
- Phylum: Arthropoda
- Subphylum: Chelicerata
- Class: Arachnida
- Order: Araneae
- Infraorder: Araneomorphae
- Family: Zodariidae
- Genus: Diores
- Species: D. termitophagus

Binomial name
- Diores termitophagus Jocqué & Dippenaar-Schoeman, 1992

Species of spider

Diores termitophagus is a species of spider in the family Zodariidae. It is endemic to South Africa.

== Distribution ==
Diores termitophagus has been recorded from the Eastern Cape and Free State provinces in South Africa. The species was originally described from Middelburg in the Eastern Cape and has also been found in Golden Gate Highlands National Park.

== Habitat ==
The species inhabits the Grassland biome at altitudes ranging from 1287 to 2020 metres above sea level. They have been sampled from areas with high Hodotermes mossambicus termite activity.

== Description ==
Both males and females of Diores termitophagus have a total length of 4.69 mm. The carapace, chelicerae, and legs are pale yellow, with the sternum also being pale. Females have a sepia dorsum on the opisthosoma with five pale chevrons, with the posterior three anastomosing, and pale yellow sides and venter. Males have similar coloration but with a narrow pale brown scutum in front followed by three or four anastomosing chevrons. The carapace is sparsely haired.

== Ecology ==
Diores termitophagus are free-living ground-dwellers that construct igloo-shaped retreats with small stones. Unlike most members of the genus that prey on ants, this species specializes in hunting termites and is assumed to be an obligate termite-eater.

== Conservation ==
The species is listed as Data Deficient. While it was very abundant at the type locality, more sampling is needed to determine its range. It has been recorded from Golden Gate Highlands National Park.
