= Cyanippus (son of Pharax) =

Mythological Thessalian hunter

In Greek mythology, Cyanippus (Ancient Greek: Κυάνιππος, romanized: Kuánippos, lit. 'dark horse') is a minor character, a hunter from Thessaly, a region in central Greece. He married a woman named Leucone, but he often neglected her due to his frequent hunting in the woods. The suspicious Leucone followed him one day unbeknownst to him, and was attacked and killed by his hunting dogs in his absence. When he found her torn body, he killed himself in regret.

== Family ==
The Thessalian Cyanippus was the son of a man named Pharax by an unnamed mother. Nothing more is known about his family or lineage.

== Mythology ==
The myth goes that the hunter Cyanippus fell in love with the very beautiful Leucone, and begged her parents for her hand in marriage, which they agreed to. The couple was married soon enough but Cyanippus, being a hunter, greatly enjoyed hunting wild animals in the woods for large amounts of time each day, leaving his wife neglected. Often when he returned home at night he would be too tired to even say a word to Leucone, or sometimes he would spend the entire night in the woods and not come back home to her at all.

Time passed, and as Cyanippus continued to neglect his home and wife, Leucone began suspecting that he was being unfaithful to her, and that he was using the forest and hunting as an excuse to meet another woman there, secretly from her. So one day she took the decision to dress up in hunting gear and follow him in secret as he went out to hunt, unwitting of her suspicions or intentions. When Cyanippus was not around, his hunting dogs, which were extremely savage, scented the hiding Leucone, and mistaking her for some wild animal, they attacked and tore her into pieces.

Sometime later, Cyanippus discovered his wife's lifeless body, torn to pieces. He was then consumed with immense grief, and proceeded to light Leucone's funeral pyre with the help of his hunting companions. He lifted her dead body up in the pyre, and then slew all of his hounds that had caused her death. After that, he took his own life as well.

== Cultural background ==
The story of Cyanippus and Leucone belong to a pattern of late Hellenistic love stories where the male protagonist kills himself after his love dies, whose unfortunate death he blames on himself. Other stories following this motif are Pamphilus and Eurydice (perhaps the earliest example), Anthippe and Cichyrus, and finally Pyramus and Thisbe, the myth which inspired William Shakespeare's famous tragedy Romeo and Juliet.

== See also ==
- Actaeon, another man who was devoured by his own hunting dogs
- Cephalus, another man who killed his wife while hunting

== Bibliography ==
- Avery, Catherine B., ed. (1962). New Century Classical Handbook. New York, US: Appleton-Century-Crofts.
- Avezzù, Guido (2016). "Classical Paradigms of Tragic Choice in Civic Stories of Love and Death". In Bigliazzi, Silvia; Calvi, Lisanna (eds.). Shakespeare, Romeo and Juliet, and Civic Life: The Boundaries of Civic Space. UK: Routledge. ISBN 978-1-138-83998-4.
- Frey, Alexander (2006). "Cyanippus". In Cancik, Hubert; Schneider, Helmuth (eds.). Brill's New Pauly. Translated by Christine F. Salazar. Basle: Brill Reference Online. doi:10.1163/1574-9347_bnp_e625350.
- Grimal, Pierre (1987). The Dictionary of Classical Mythology. Wiley-Blackwell. ISBN 0-631-13209-0.
- Parthenius of Nicaea, Love Romances, translated by Sir Stephen Gaselee (1882–1943), Loeb Classical Library, 1916. Online version at topos text.
- Plutarch, Moralia, Volume IV: Roman Questions. Greek Questions. Greek and Roman Parallel Stories. On the Fortune of the Romans. On the Fortune or the Virtue of Alexander. Were the Athenians More Famous in War or in Wisdom?, translated by Frank Cole Babbitt. Loeb Classical Library 305. Cambridge, MA: Harvard University Press, 1936.
- Westermann, Anton (1839). Paradoxographoe. London: Harvard College Library.
