= Polycrite =

In Greek legendary history, Polycrite (Πολυκρίτη) was a maiden of Naxos who, as her home city was besieged by the armies of Miletus and Erythraea, came to be loved by the Erythraean general Diognetus, and devised a stratagem which led to the victory of the Naxians. There existed two versions of her story, which are as follows.

According to Plutarch (who follows the Naxian authors) and Polyaenus, Polycrite was taken captive by Diognetus as he ravaged Naxos; he fell in love with Polycrite and made her his legal wife. As the Milesian army was celebrating a religious festival, Polycrite asked Diognetus if she could send some bakery to her brothers in the besieged city. He permitted and even encouraged her to do so; she then enclosed a tablet with a note in a loaf of bread, instructing her brothers to take advantage of the fact that the Milesians were going to get drunk during the celebrations, and to attack at night. The brothers in turn delivered the message to the Naxian generals, who followed the advice of Polycrite and thus won a victory over the Milesians. Polycrite asked for mercy on Diognetus, saving him and his possessions. As the citizens welcomed her at the gate of the city, she was so overwhelmed with joy that she could not bear it and fell down dead. She was buried on the spot, and her tomb became known as the "Tomb of Envy", as though Fate became envious of her and would not let her enjoy the honors.

In another version, which was recorded by Parthenius of Nicaea and, according to Plutarch's remark, was also followed by Aristotle, Polycrite had been accidentally left at a temple of Artemis outside the city when the city itself was blockaded by the Milesians. There she was spotted by Diognetus who became enamoured of her. Out of piety he dared not take her by force in the temple and thus sent messages asking her to become his lover. At first she would reject those but then responded that she would consent on condition that he swear by the name of Artemis to fulfill any wish of hers in return. When he did so, she told him to betray his Milesian allies and support the Naxians instead. He was hesitant at first but then, impressed by the girl's patriotism, agreed. In the meantime, the Milesian army was celebrating the Thargelia, which was going to be a distraction. Diognetus and Polycrite decided to make use of this and sent a loaf of bread to Polycrite's brothers in the city; in the loaf was put a tablet with instructions for them. When Polycles, a brother of Polycrite, received the message, he was unsure whether they could trust Diognetus, but eventually a decision was made in favor of action. The following night, the Naxians broke through the blockading wall with assistance of Diognetus who held up a signal light and left a gate open for them. In the battle that ensued, the Naxians were victorious but Diognetus was killed. Polycrite was much honored for saving her home city, and the people brought her so many gifts that she was suffocated under their weight and died. Her and Diognetus' bodies were placed on one and the same funeral pyre, and a hundred sheep were sacrificed at her funeral ceremony.
