= Parthenius of Nicaea =

Ancient Greek poet

Parthenius of Nicaea (Greek: Παρθένιος ὁ Νικαεύς) or Myrlea (Greek: ὁ Μυρλεανός) in Bithynia was a Greek grammarian and poet. According to the Suda, he was the son of Heraclides and Eudora, or according to Hermippus of Berytus, his mother's name was Tetha. He was taken prisoner by Helvius Cinna in the Mithridatic Wars and carried to Rome in 66 BC. He subsequently visited Neapolis, where he taught Greek to Virgil, according to Macrobius. Parthenius is said to have lived until the accession of Tiberius in 14 AD.

Parthenius was a writer of elegies, especially dirges, and of short epic poems.

He is sometimes called "the last of the Alexandrians".

== Erotica Pathemata ==
His only surviving work, the Erotica Pathemata (Ἐρωτικὰ Παθήματα, Of the Sorrows of Love), was set out, the poet says in his preface, "in the shortest possible form" and dedicated to the poet Cornelius Gallus, as "a storehouse from which to draw material". Erotica Pathemata is a collection of thirty-six epitomes of love-stories, all of which have tragic or sentimental endings, taken from histories and historicised fictions as well as poetry.

As Parthenius generally quotes his authorities, these stories are valuable as affording information on the Alexandrian poets and grammarians.

=== Contents ===
The mythical or legendary characters whose stories are presented in Erotica Pathemata are as follows.

1. Lyrcus
2. Polymela
3. Evippe
4. Oenone
5. Leucippus
6. Pallene
7. Hipparinus of Heraclea
8. Herippe
9. Polycrite
10. Leucone, wife of Cyanippus
11. Byblis
12. Calchus
13. Harpalyce
14. Antheus, loved and killed by Cleoboea
15. Daphne
16. Laodice
17. Cratea, mother of Periander
18. Neaera
19. Pancrato, daughter of Iphimedeia
20. Aëro, daughter of Oenopion
21. Pisidice of Methymna
22. Nanis
23. Chilonis
24. Hipparinus of Syracuse
25. Phayllus
26. Apriate (see Trambelus)
27. Alcinoë
28. Clite
29. Daphnis
30. Celtine
31. Dimoetes
32. Anthippe
33. Assaon
34. Corythus
35. Eulimene
36. Arganthone

== Other works ==
In Parthenius' own time, he was not famous for his prose but his poems. These are listed below:

- Arete
- Dirge on Archelais
- Aphrodite
- Bias
- Delos
- Krinagoras
- Leucadiai
- Anthippe
- Dirge on Auxithemis
- Idolophanes
- Herakles
- Iphiklos
- Metamorphoses
- Propemptikon
- A Greek original of Moretum

== The surviving manuscript ==
Parthenius is one of the few ancient writers whose work survives in only one manuscript. The only surviving manuscript of Parthenius was called Palatinus Heidelbergensis graecus 398 (P), probably written in the mid-9th century AD. It contains a diverse mixture of geography, excerpts from Hesychius of Alexandria, paradoxography, epistolography and mythology.

== Editions of Parthenius ==
- 1531: Editio princeps, edited by Janus Cornarius. Basle, Froben.
- 1601: Editio princeps Graeca, in: Achilles Tatius: De Clitophontis et Leucippes amoribus Lib. VIII; Longus: De Daphnidis et Chloes amoribus Lib. IV; Parthenius Nicaenus: De amatoriis affectibus Lib. 1; Graece ac Latine. Officina Commeliniana, s.l. [Heidelberg].
- 1675: Historiae poeticae scriptores antiqui, edited by Thomas Gale, Paris.
- 1798: Legrand and Heyne, Göttingen.
- 1824: Corpus scriptorum eroticorum Graecorum, Passow, Leipzig.
- 1843: Analecta alexandrina, Augustus Meineke (ed.), Berolini sumptibus Th. chr. Fr. Enslini.
- 1843: Mythographoi. Scriptores poetiace historiae graeci, Antonius Westermann (ed.), Brunsvigae sumptum fecit Georgius Westermann, pagg. 152-81.
- 1856: Didot edition, Erotici scriptores, Hirschig, Paris.
- 1858: Hercher, Erotici Scriptores Graeci, Leipzig.
- 1896: Mythographi graeci, Paulus Sakolowski (ed.), vol. II, fasc. I, Lipsiae in aedibus B. G. Teubneri.
- 1902: Mythographi graeci, Edgar Martini (ed.), vol. II, fasc. I suppl., Lipsiae in aedibus B. G. Teubneri.
- 1916: S. Gaselee, Longus: Daphnis and Chloe and the love romances of Parthenius and other fragments, with English translation.
- 2000: J.L. Lightfoot, Parthenius of Nicaea: the poetical fragments and the Erōtika pathēmata. ISBN 0-19-815253-1. Reviewed by Christopher Francese at The Bryn Mawr Classical Review
- 2008: Michèle Biraud, Dominique Voisin, and Arnaud Zucker (trans. and comm.), Parthénios de Nicée. Passions d'amour. Grenoble: Éditions Jérôme Millon. Reviewed by Simone Viarre at The Bryn Mawr Classical Review

== See also ==
- Lyrcus
