= Diores =

Four people in Greek mythology

In Greek mythology, Diores (Ancient Greek: Διώρης, romanized: Diṓrēs) referred to four different people.

- Diores, father of Automedon who was the charioteer of Achilles during the Trojan War.
- Diores, leader of the Elis contingent during the Trojan War. He was the son of Amarynceus, and was killed by Peiros.
- Diores, a Trojan prince who participated in the games held by the exiled Aeneas in Sicily. He was killed by Turnus, the man who opposed Aeneas in Italy.
- Diores, son of Aeolus, who married his sister Polymele. With his father's approval, he married his sister who was otherwise about to be put to death because of her secret love affair with Odysseus.
