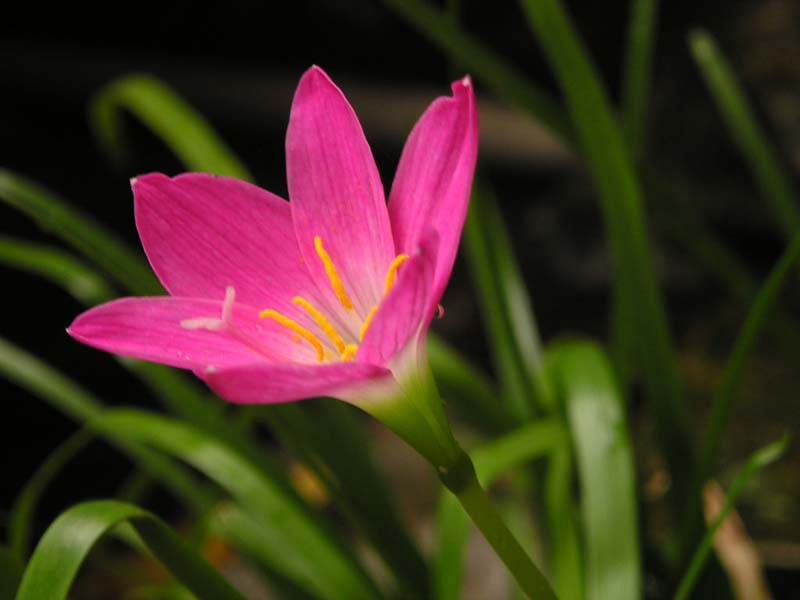

Scientific classification
- Kingdom: Plantae
- Clade: Tracheophytes
- Clade: Angiosperms
- Clade: Monocots
- Order: Asparagales
- Family: Amaryllidaceae
- Subfamily: Amaryllidoideae
- Genus: Zephyranthes
- Species: Z. rosea

Binomial name
- Zephyranthes rosea Lindl.

Synonyms
- Amaryllis carnea Schult. & Schult.f.; Amaryllis rosea (Lindl.) Spreng. nom. illeg.; Atamasco rosea (Lindl.) Greene; Zephyranthes carnea (Schult. & Schult.f.) D.Dietr.

= Zephyranthes rosea =

Cuban zephyr lily

Species of plant

Zephyranthes rosea, commonly known as the Cuban zephyrlily, rosy rain lily, rose fairy lily, rose zephyr lily or the pink rain lily, is a species of rain lily native to Peru and Colombia. They are widely cultivated as ornamentals and have become naturalized in tropical regions worldwide. Like all rain lilies, they are known for blooming only after heavy rains.

They contain potentially lethal toxins.

== Description ==
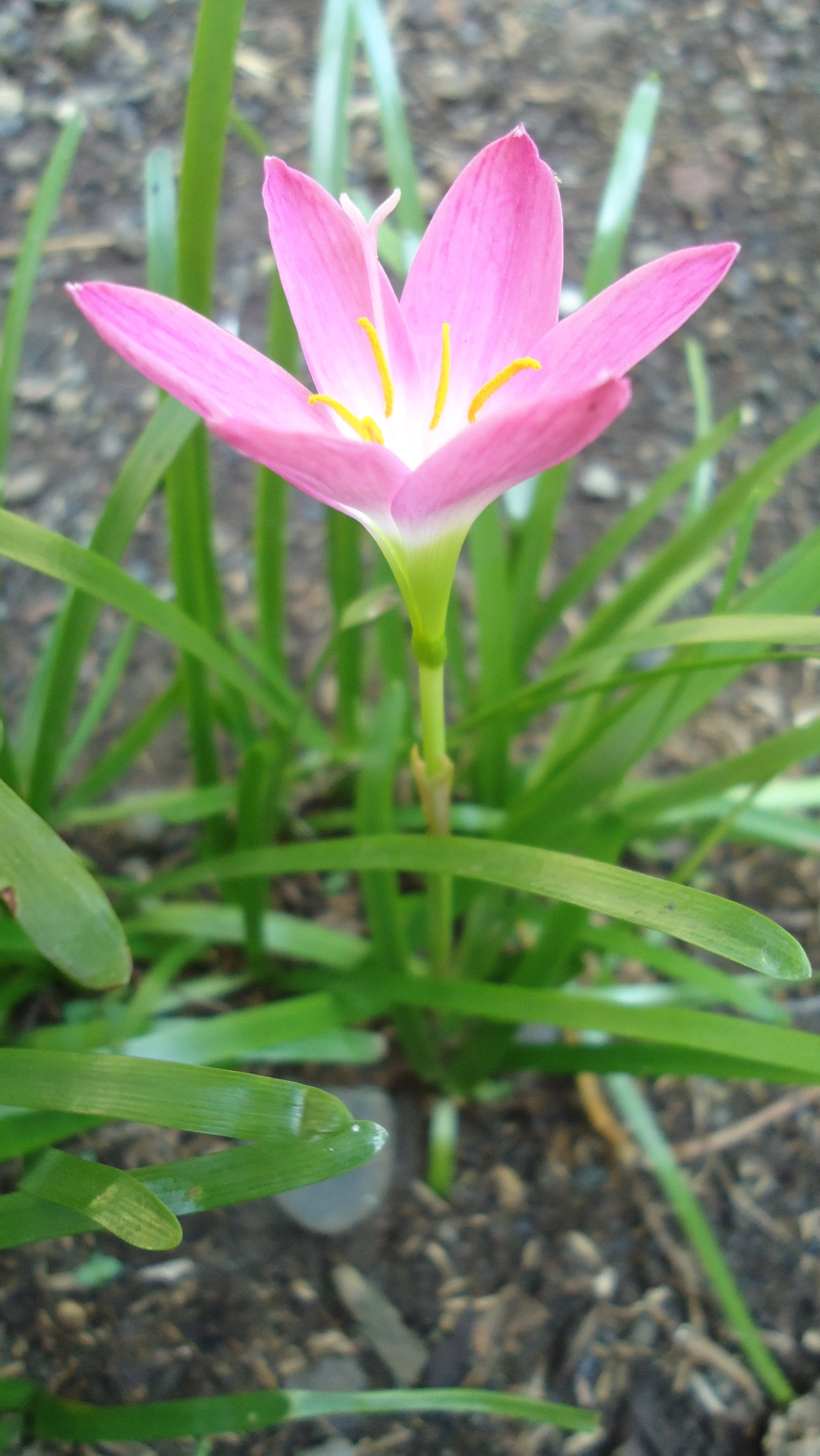
A pink rain lily from the Philippines

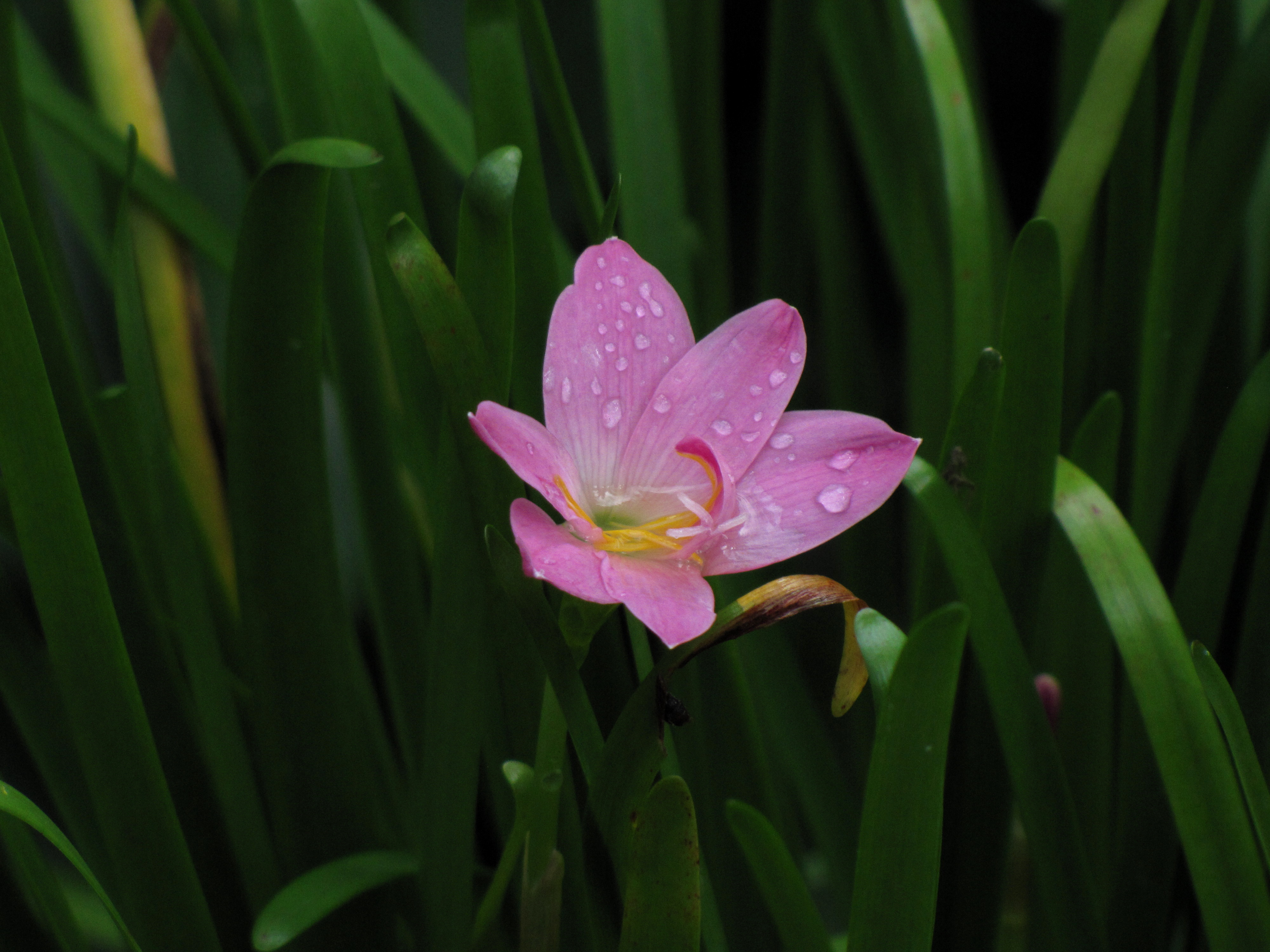
A pink Zephyranthes rosea from Kooveri, Kerala

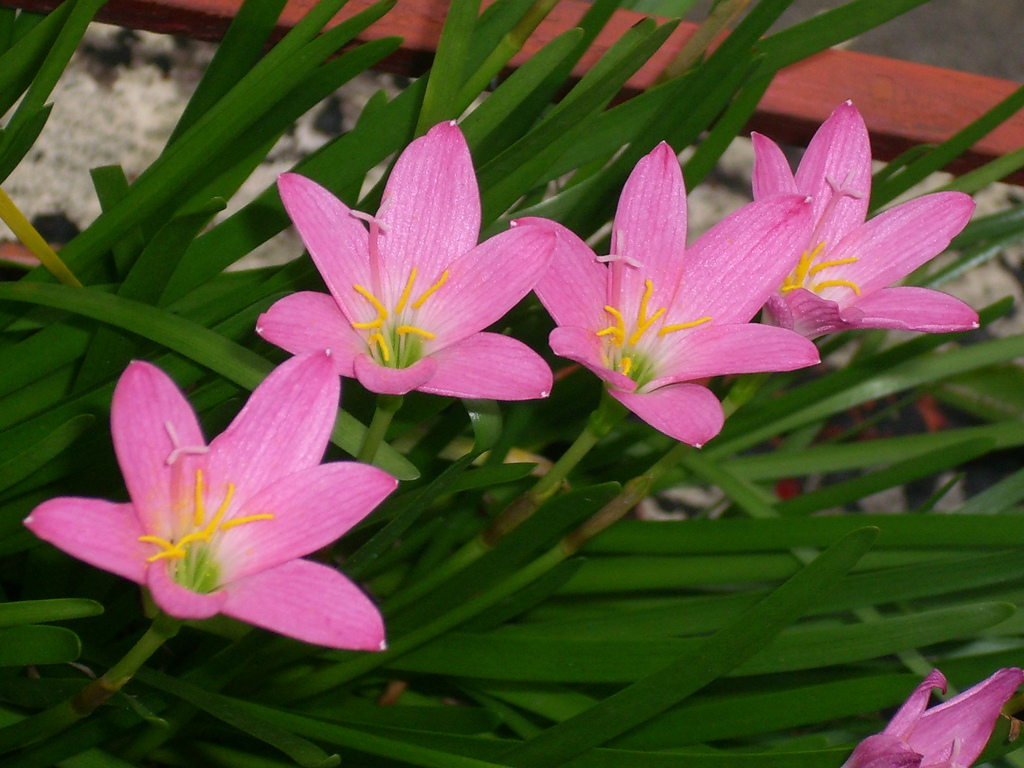
Several pink rain lilies in bloom

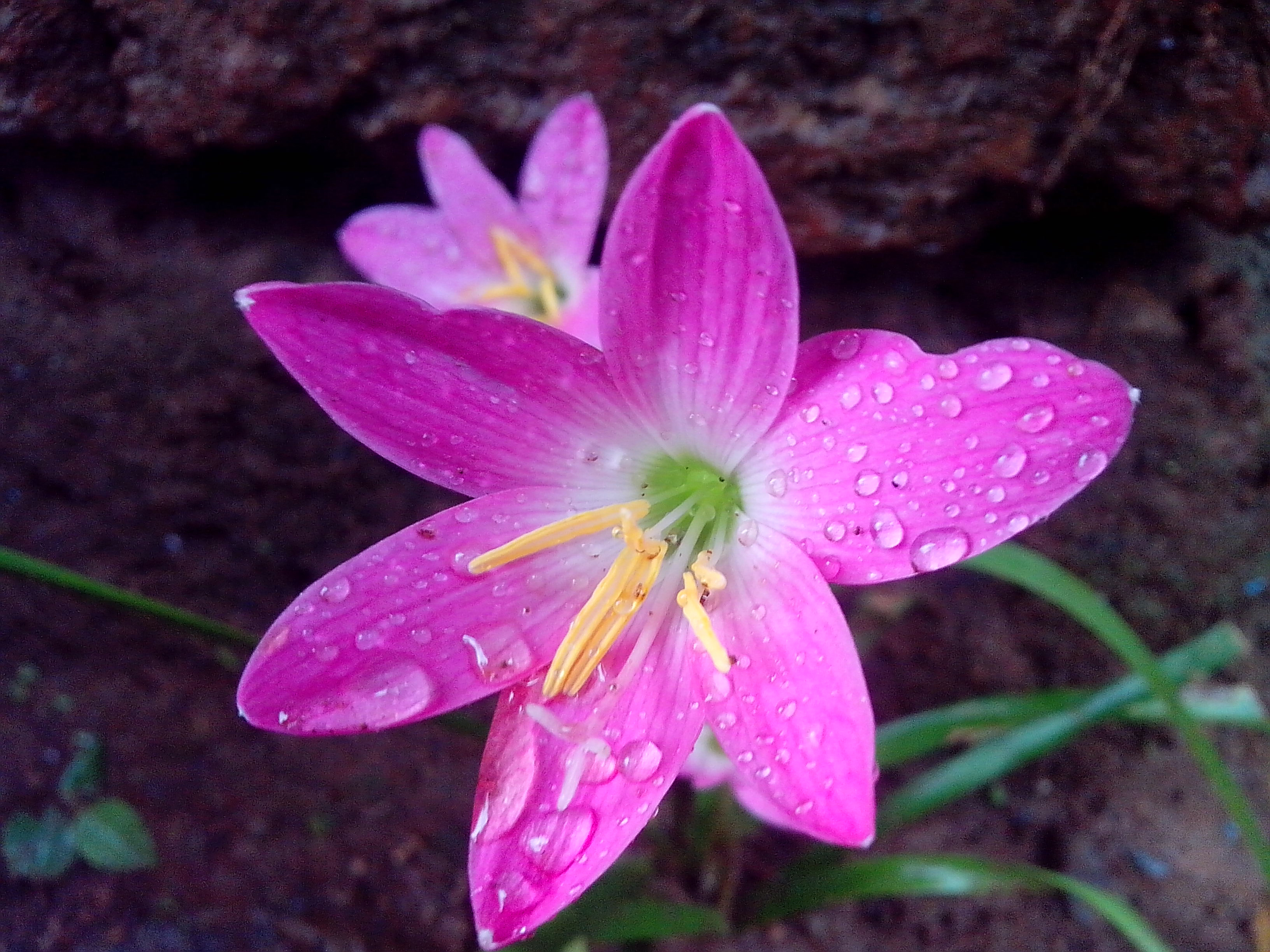
A pink Zephyranthes rosea from Chemmad, Kerala India

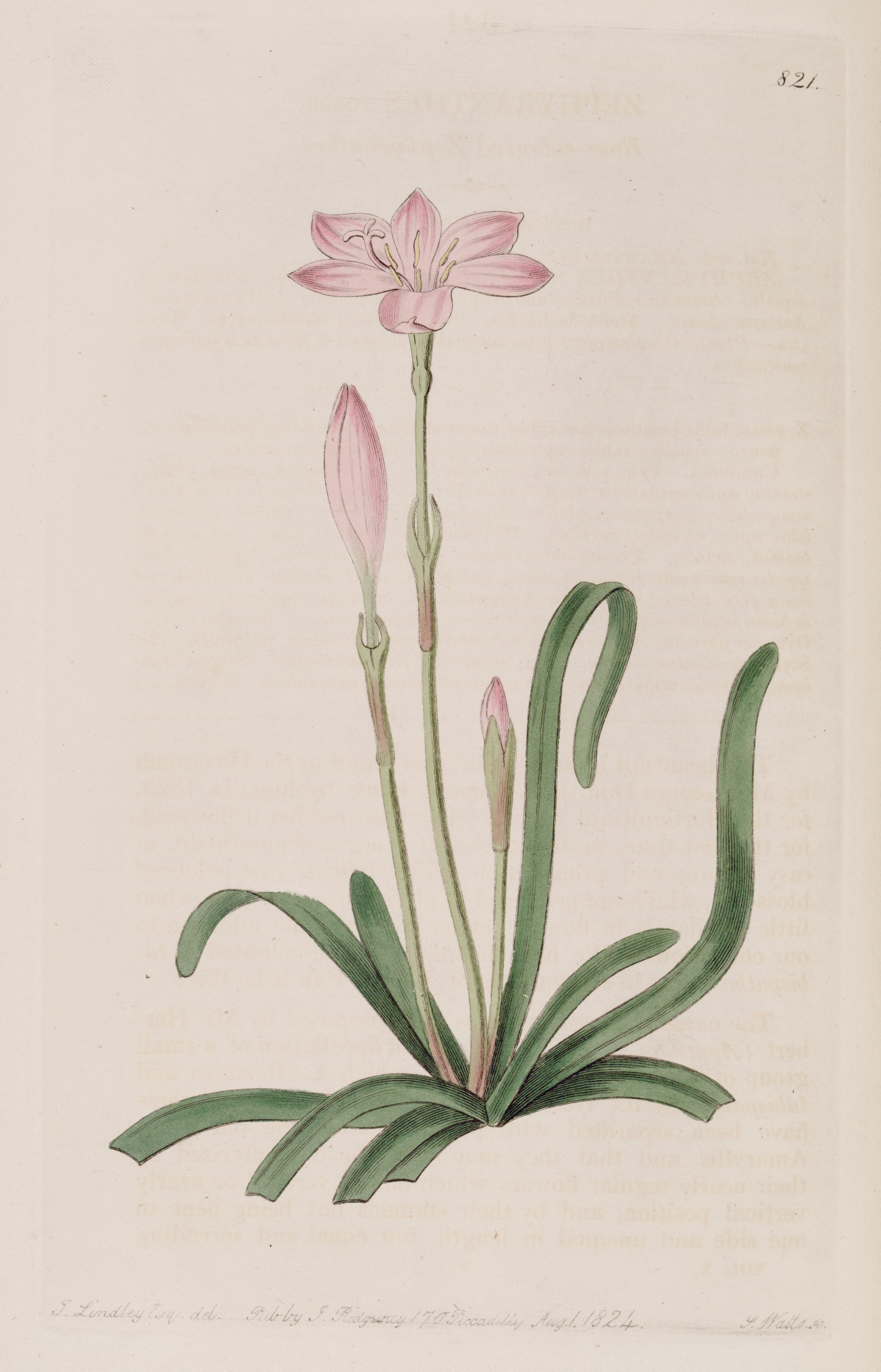
Botanical Register; Consisting of Coloured Figures of Exotic Plants Cultivated in British Gardens; with their History and Mode of Treatment. London 10: t. 821. 1824.

Zephyranthes rosea are perennial herbaceous monocots. They are small plants, reaching only 15 to 20 cm (5.9 to 7.9 in) in height. They bear five to six narrow and flattened dark green linear leaves, about 3 to 4 mm (0.12 to 0.16 in) wide, from spherical tunicate bulbs around 1.5 to 2.5 centimetres (0.59 to 0.98 in) in diameter.

The single funnel-shaped flowers are borne erect or slightly inclined on scapes around 10 to 15 cm (3.9 to 5.9 in) long. The spathes are around 2 to 2.8 cm (0.79 to 1.10 in) long and slightly divided only at the tip. The fragrant six-petaled flowers are around 2.5 cm (0.98 in) in diameter and 3 to 3.5 cm (1.2 to 1.4 in) in length. The perianth is bright pink with a green central perianth tube that is less than 5 mm (0.20 in) long. The six stamens are of different lengths – one of 11 mm (0.43 in), one of 16 mm (0.63 in), and four between 12 and 13 mm (0.47 and 0.51 in). They are shorter than the style and inserted at the mouth of the perianth. The anthers are 3 to 6 mm (0.12 to 0.24 in) long.

The flowers develop into capsules that are divided deeply into three lobes. The seeds are shiny black and flattened.

== Classification ==
Zephyranthes rosea belongs to the genus Zephyranthes (rain lilies) of the subtribe Zephyranthinea of the tribe Hippeastreae. It is classified under the subfamily Amaryllidoideae of the Amaryllis family (Amaryllidaceae).

== Nomenclature ==
Zephyranthes rosea (like other rain lilies) are so named because they produce short-lived flowers only after seasonal heavy rains or storms. In Z. rosea, this usually occurs during the late summer. The generic name Zephyranthes literally means "flowers of the west wind", from Greek ζέφυρος (zéphuros, the god of the west wind) and ἄνθος (anthos, 'flower'). Zephyrus, the Greek personification of the west wind, is also associated with rainfall. The specific name comes from Latin for 'rosy'.

Other common names of Z. rosea include 'pink rain lily', 'pink fairy lily', 'pink magic lily', 'pink zephyr lily', 'rain flower', and 'rose rain lily'. It is also commonly known as duende rojo ('red dwarf') and leli de San Jose in Spanish; and rosafarbene and Windblume in German.

Zephyranthes rosea is one of the two Zephyranthes species known as the 'pink rain lily'. The other species is Zephyranthes carinata, usually referred to incorrectly as Zephyranthes grandiflora. Z. carinata is often mislabeled as Z. rosea by merchants. Z. carinata can be distinguished from true Z. rosea by their much larger flowers with a deeper pink coloration. Z. rosea also has 24 chromosomes in diploid somatic cells, in contrast to 48 in Z. carinata.

Another similar species known under the same common names is Zephyranthes robusta. They can be differentiated from Z. rosea by having paler pink and larger flowers.

== Distribution and habitat ==
Zephyranthes rosea is native to Peru and Colombia. It is widely planted in warmer regions around the world and is reportedly naturalized in Florida, India, the West Indies, many of the islands of the Pacific and Indian Oceans. They are common in recently disturbed land and grassy areas (like lawns and meadows) that receive periodical rainfall.

== Uses ==
Zephyranthes rosea are usually propagated by dividing clumps of bulbs, but can also be grown from seeds. They are widely cultivated as ornamental plants. They are relatively low-maintenance, becoming dormant during extended periods of drought. They are less tolerant of colder temperatures than other species of Zephyranthes, however.

In India, they are also used in folk medicine, along with Zephyranthes flava.

== Research on potential medicinal properties ==
A study conducted by researchers in pharmaceuticals and drug science from Pakistan, Saudi Arabia, and Italy dried Z. rosea bulb extract, administered the extract in different doses, and performed a bronchoalveolar lavage fluid examination to extract respiratory cells. Z. rosea bulb extract was shown to reduce blood clotting and lung inflammation, pointing to a possible therapeutic use in humans.

== Toxicity ==
The bulbs of Z. rosea, like other members of Zephyranthes and Habranthus, contain various toxic alkaloids including lycorine and haemanthamine. They can cause vomiting, convulsions, and death to humans, livestock, and poultry.

== Pests and diseases ==
Pests of Z. rosea include chewing insects. They are also vulnerable to the necrotrophic fungus Botrytis cinerea.

== See also ==
- Zephyranthes atamasca – the Atamasco lily
- Zephyranthes candida – the white rain lily
- Zephyranthes puertoricensis – the Puerto Rican zephyr lily
- Habranthus – a closely related genus
