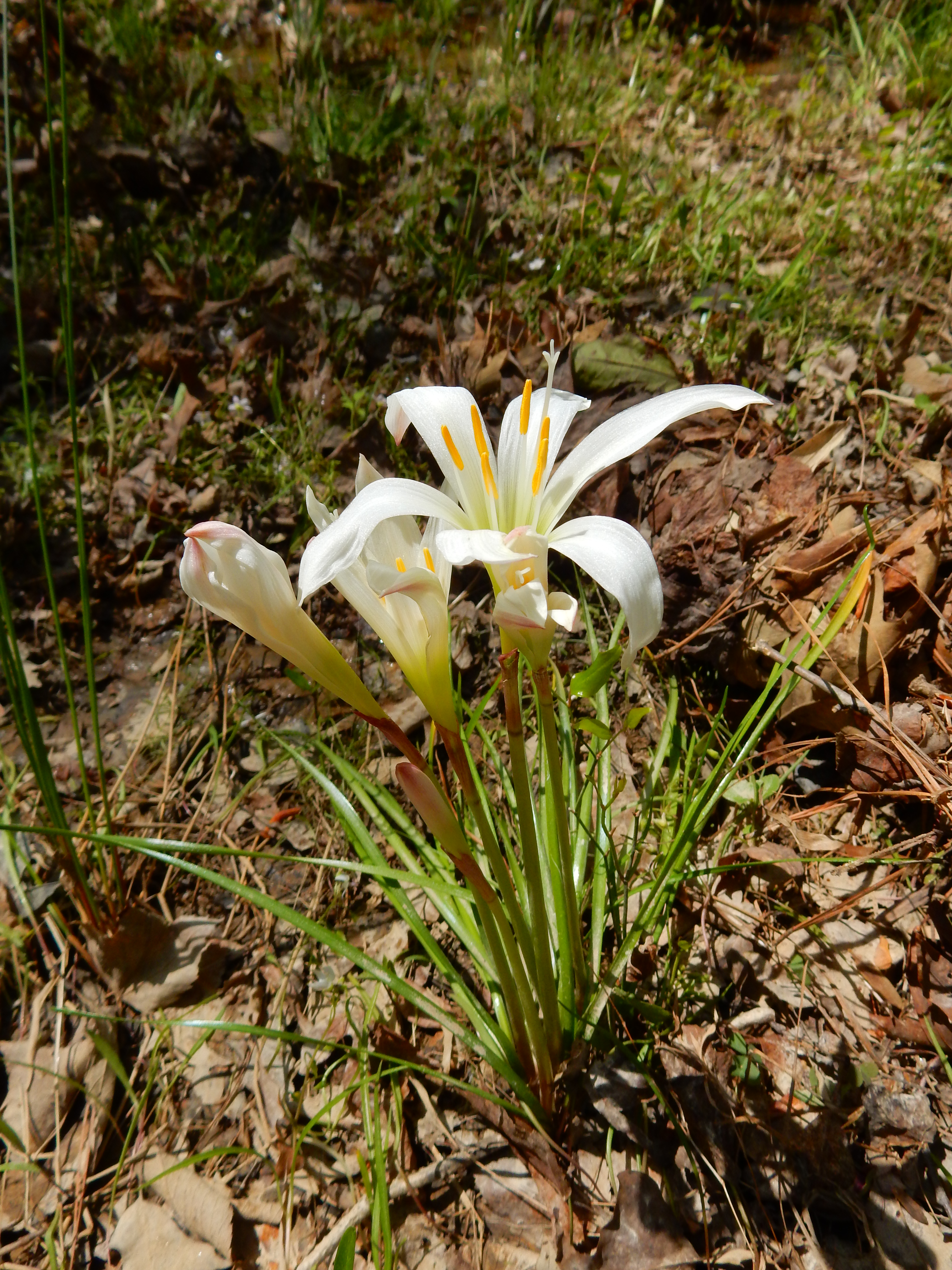
- Flowering Zephyranthes atamasco

Scientific classification
- Kingdom: Plantae
- Clade: Tracheophytes
- Clade: Angiosperms
- Clade: Monocots
- Order: Asparagales
- Family: Amaryllidaceae
- Subfamily: Amaryllidoideae
- Genus: Zephyranthes
- Subgenus: Zephyranthes subg. Zephyranthes (autonym)

Type species
- Zephyranthes atamasco (L.) Herb.

Species
- See here

= Zephyranthes subg. Zephyranthes =

Subgenus of flowering plants

Zephyranthes subg. Zephyranthes is a subgenus of the genus Zephyranthes in the amaryllis family of flowering plants.

== Description ==
=== Vegetative characteristics ===
Species in the genus are bulbous, 4–50 cm tall plants with or ovoid, globose, or pyriform bulbs. The annual or persistent, linear leaves are 10–30(–60) cm long, and (1–)2–9(–13) mm wide.

=== Generative characteristics ===
The 1–2 flowered inflorescence bears actinomorphic or zygomorphic flowers. The stigma is trifid to trilobed. The capsule fruit bears papery, black, flat, sometimes winged seeds.

=== Cytology ===
The basic chromosome number is x = 6. Various chromosome counts have been observed: 2n = 12, 14, 20, 24, 28, 30, 32, 36, 38, 48, 54, 60, 72, 110.

== Taxonomy ==
The subgenus name is an autonym.

=== Species ===
About 150 species are recognised:

- Zephyranthes amambaica (Ravenna) Nic.García & Meerow
- Zephyranthes andalgalensis (Ravenna) S.C.Arroyo
- Zephyranthes araguaiensis (Ravenna) R.S.Oliveira & Dutilh
- Zephyranthes aurata (Ravenna) Nic.García & Meerow
- Zephyranthes bahiensis (Ravenna) R.S.Oliveira & Dutilh
- Zephyranthes barrosiana (Hunz. & DiFulvio) S.C.Arroyo
- Zephyranthes botumirimensis (R.S.Oliveira) R.S.Oliveira & Dutilh
- Zephyranthes caaguazuensis (Ravenna) Nic.García & Meerow
- Zephyranthes calderensis (Ravenna) Nic.García & S.C.Arroyo
- Zephyranthes carminea (Ravenna) S.C.Arroyo
- Zephyranthes chacoensis (Ravenna) S.C.Arroyo
- Zephyranthes concinna (Ravenna) R.S.Oliveira & Dutilh
- Zephyranthes contermina (Ravenna) R.S.Oliveira & Dutilh
- Zephyranthes correntina (Roitman, J.A.Castillo & M.R.Barrios) Nic.García & S.C.Arroyo
- Zephyranthes crassibulba (Ravenna) S.C.Arroyo
- Zephyranthes datensis (Ravenna) R.S.Oliveira & Dutilh
- Zephyranthes duarteana (Ravenna) R.S.Oliveira & Dutilh
- Zephyranthes gameleirensis (Ravenna) R.S.Oliveira & Dutilh
- Zephyranthes goiana (Ravenna) R.S.Oliveira & Dutilh
- Zephyranthes guachipensis (Ravenna) S.C.Arroyo
- Zephyranthes immaculata (Traub & Clint) Nic.García & Meerow
- Zephyranthes irwiniana (Ravenna) Nic.García
- Zephyranthes ischihualasta (Ravenna) S.C.Arroyo
- Zephyranthes itaobina (Ravenna) Nic.García
- Zephyranthes lehmilleri Nic.García & Meerow
- Zephyranthes leonensis (Ravenna) S.C.Arroyo
- Zephyranthes leptandra (Ravenna) Nic.García
- Zephyranthes lucida (R.S.Oliveira) R.S.Oliveira & Dutilh
- Zephyranthes magnoi (Ravenna) S.C.Arroyo
- Zephyranthes martinezii (Ravenna) Nic.García
- Zephyranthes mataca (Ravenna) S.C.Arroyo
- Zephyranthes matogrossensis (Ravenna) R.S.Oliveira & Dutilh
- Zephyranthes medinae (L.O.Alvarado & García-Mendoza) Nic.García & Meerow
- Zephyranthes mexicana (T.M.Howard) Nic.García & Meerow
- Zephyranthes microcarpa (Rusby) S.C.Arroyo
- Zephyranthes millarensis (Ravenna) Nic.García
- Zephyranthes minor (Ravenna) R.S.Oliveira & Dutilh
- Zephyranthes neumannii (Roitman, J.A.Castillo & Maza) Nic.García & S.C.Arroyo
- Zephyranthes nivea (Ravenna) S.C.Arroyo
- Zephyranthes oranensis (Ravenna) S.C.Arroyo
- Zephyranthes pantanalensis (Ravenna) R.S.Oliveira & Dutilh
- Zephyranthes philadelphica (Ravenna) Nic.García & Meerow
- Zephyranthes picta (Ravenna) S.C.Arroyo
- Zephyranthes riojana (Ravenna) S.C.Arroyo
- Zephyranthes rubra (Ravenna) R.S.Oliveira & Dutilh
- Zephyranthes ruizlealii (Ravenna) S.C.Arroyo
- Zephyranthes saipinensis (Ravenna) Nic.García
- Zephyranthes salinarum (Ravenna) S.C.Arroyo
- Zephyranthes saltensis (Ravenna) S.C.Arroyo
- Zephyranthes sanavirone (Roitman, J.A.Castillo, G.M.Tourn & Uria) Nic.García & S.C.Arroyo
- Zephyranthes schulziana (Ravenna) S.C.Arroyo
- Zephyranthes spectabilis (Ravenna) S.C.Arroyo
- Zephyranthes steyermarkii (Ravenna) S.C.Arroyo
- Zephyranthes tepicensis (Greenm. ex Flagg & G.Lom.Sm.) Flagg & G.Lom.Sm.
- Zephyranthes venturiana (Ravenna) S.C.Arroyo
- Zephyranthes vittata (T.M.Howard) Nic.García & Meerow
- Zephyranthes zapotecana Nic.García & Meerow

== Distribution ==
Mexico is a centre of diversity of Zephyranthes subg. Zephyranthes.
