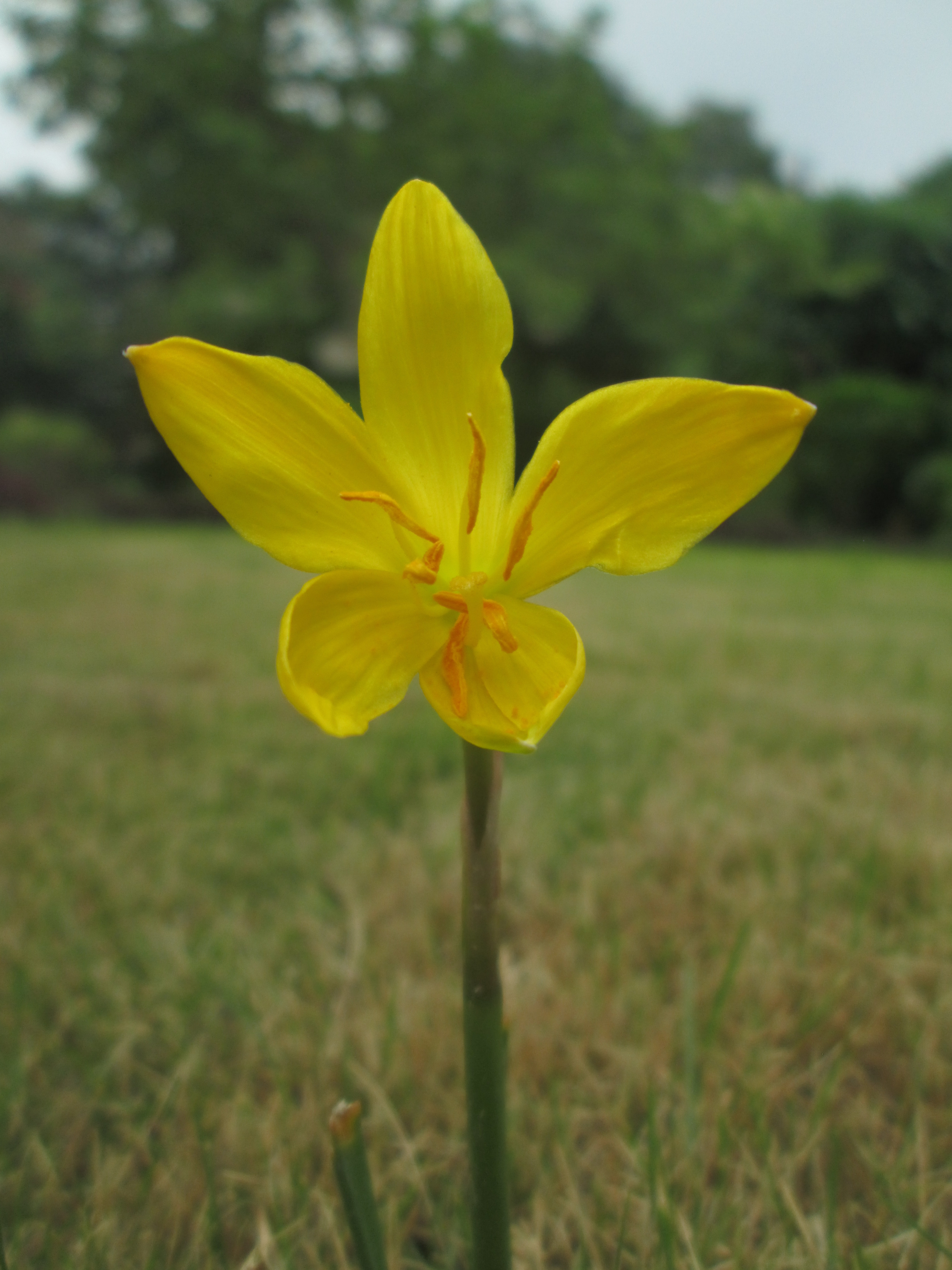

Scientific classification
- Kingdom: Plantae
- Clade: Tracheophytes
- Clade: Angiosperms
- Clade: Monocots
- Order: Asparagales
- Family: Amaryllidaceae
- Subfamily: Amaryllidoideae
- Genus: Zephyranthes
- Species: Z. citrina

Binomial name
- Zephyranthes citrina Baker (1882)

Synonyms
- Atamosco eggersiana(Urb.) Britton (1918); Zephyranthes eggersiana Urb. (1907); Zephyranthes sulphurea Noter (1905)

= Zephyranthes citrina =

Yellow rain lily

Species of flowering plant

Zephyranthes citrina, is a species of bulbous plant belong to the family Amaryllidaceae, native to Mexico.

== Description ==
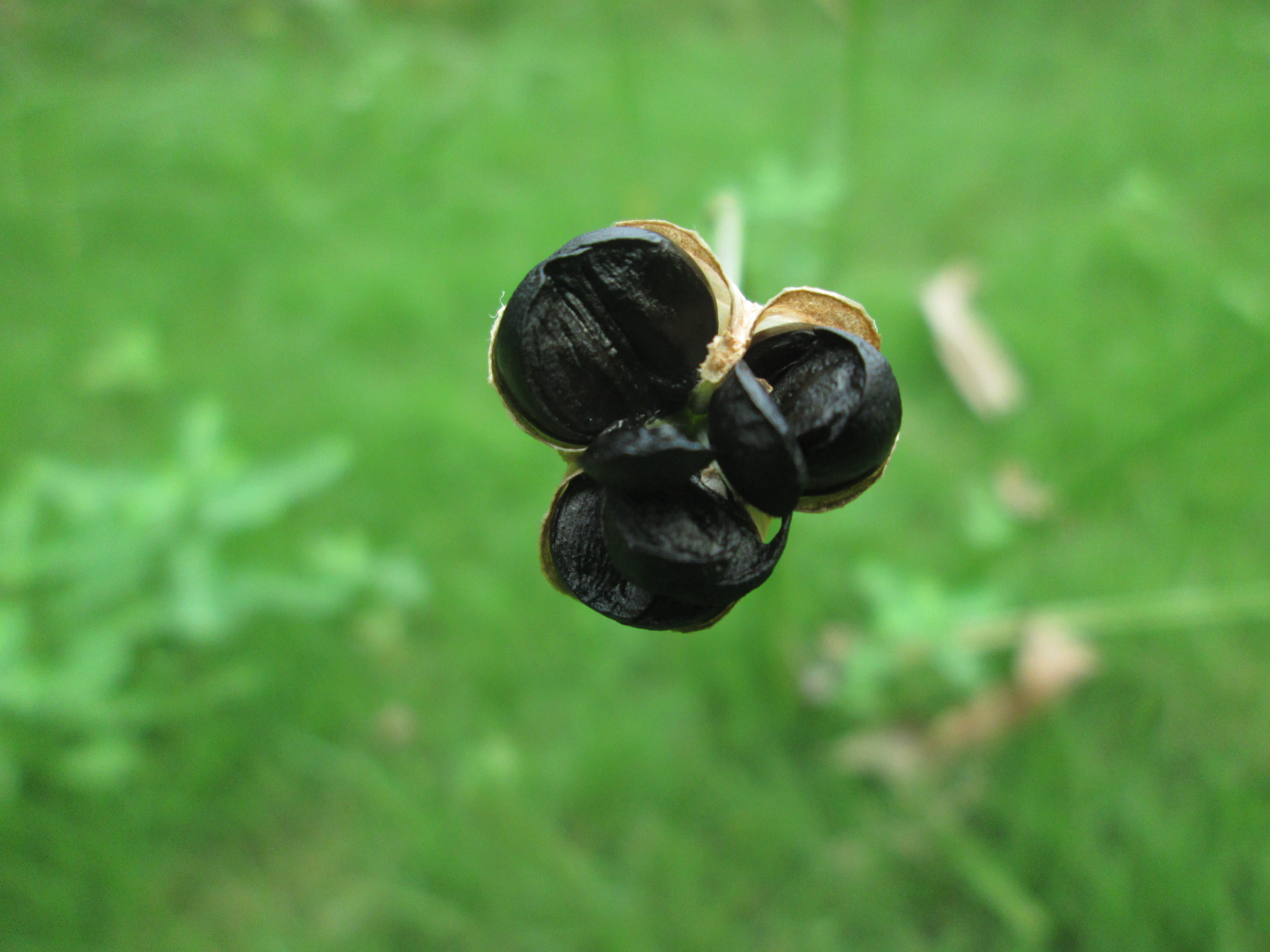
Zephyranthes citrina seeds

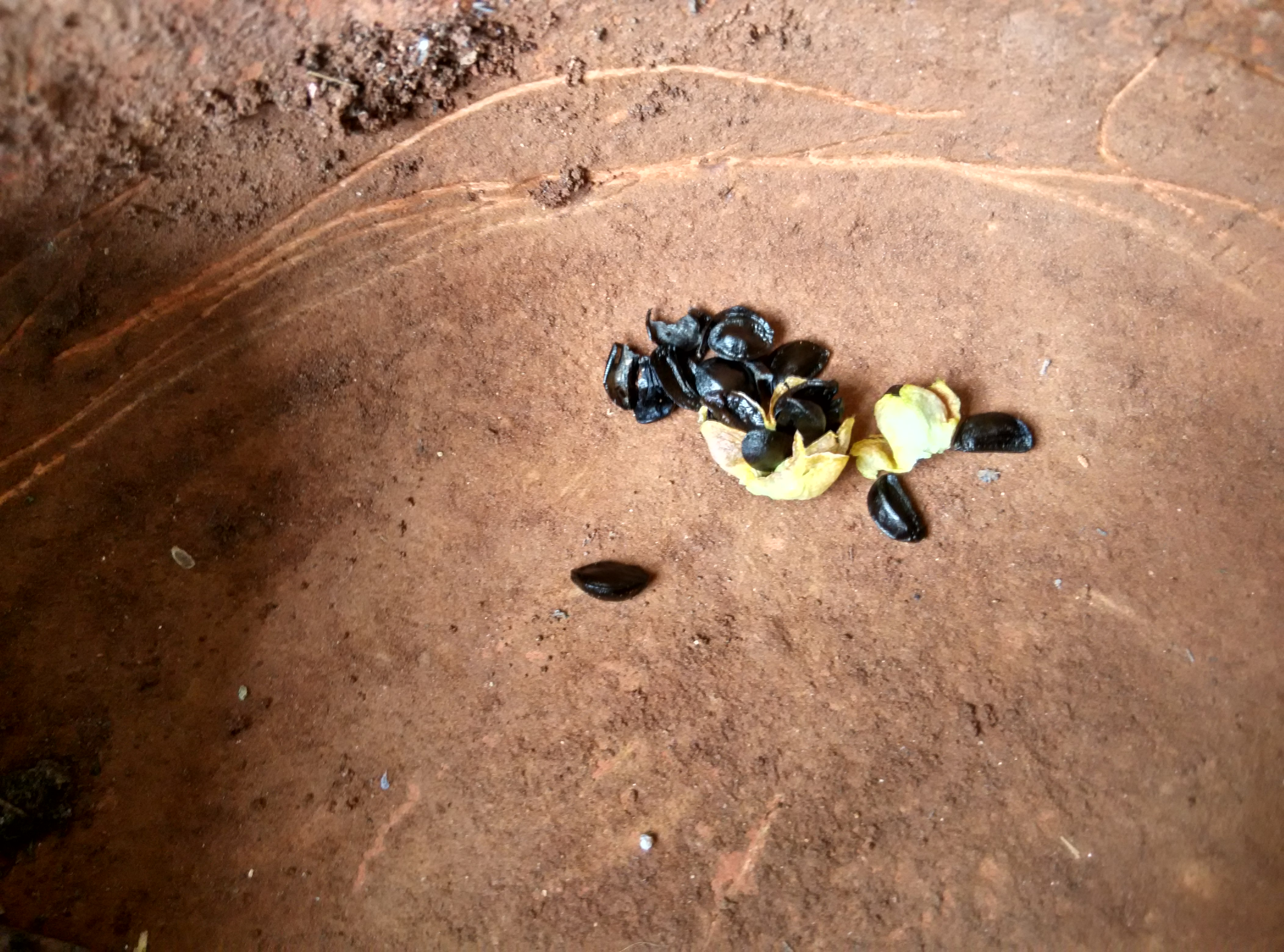
Seeds of Zephyranthes citrina.

It is a bulbous plant with green leaves dull 4 mm wide. The upright flowers with lemon yellow color, funnel-shaped from 3.1 to 5 cm, green tube. The number chromosome is 2n = 48. It grows luxuriantly in natural grasslands and gardens in the month of July after rain. On blooming, it makes the gardens yellowish in waterlogged plains of Punjab. Commonly, it is known as the citron zephyrlily or yellow rain lily.

== Taxonomy ==
Zephyranthes citrina was described by Baker and published in Botanical Magazine 108: pl. 6605, in 1882. (February 1, 1882)

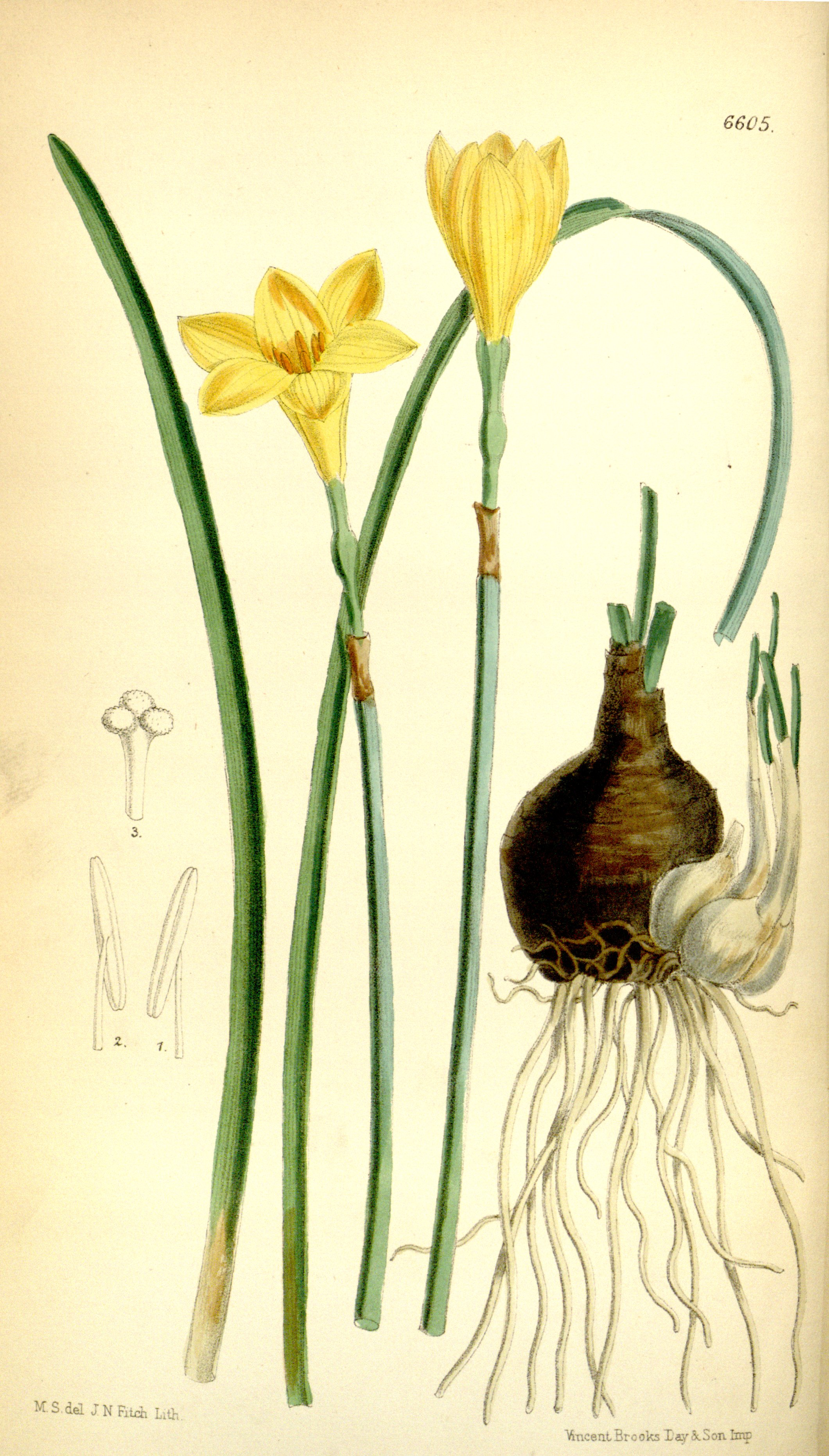

== Chemical Constituent ==
It contains Lycorine, Lycorenine, Galanthine, Haemanthamine, Oxomaritidine, Maritidine, Hemanthamine, Haemanthidine, Vittatine, Galanthine, Narcissidine.
