= Water onion =

Water onion is a common name for several plants and may refer to:

- Eleocharis dulcis, native to Asia, tropical Africa, and Oceania
- Crinum species
- Zephyranthes species
