= Pink rain lily =

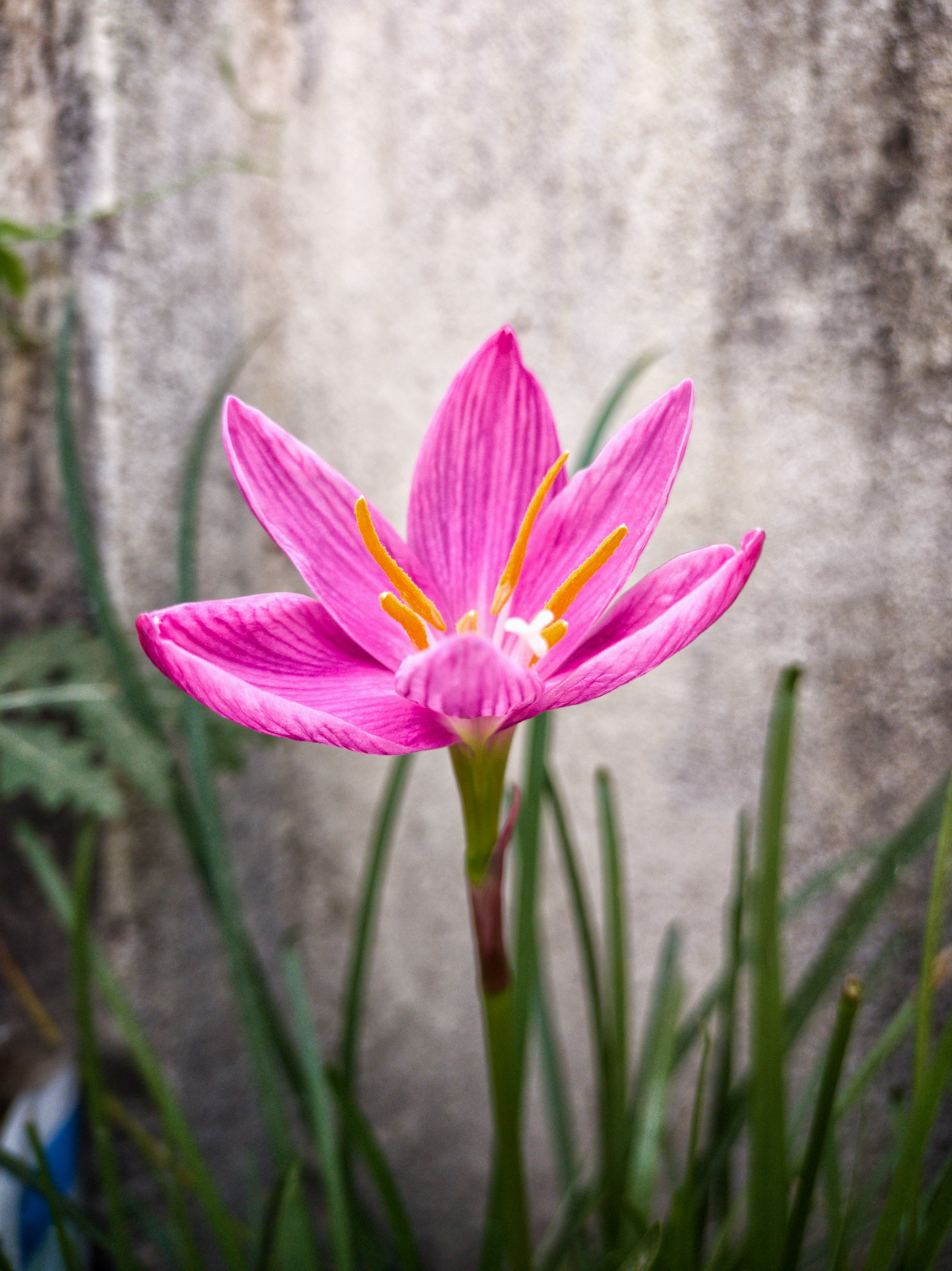
Pink rain lily

Pink rain lily, pink fairy lily, pink zephyr lily, and pink magic lily are the common names of several species of flowering plants belonging to the genera Zephyranthes and Habranthus (rain lilies):

- Zephyranthes carinata (commonly referred to as Zephyranthes grandiflora in horticulture)
- Zephyranthes minuta
- Zephyranthes rosea
- Zephyranthes robusta
