= Easter lily =

Easter lily may refer to:

- Easter Lily (badge), an Irish republican badge
- Easter Lily (EP), a 2026 EP by the Irish rock band U2

== Plants ==
- Hippeastrum puniceum, a bulbous plant native to tropical regions of South America
- Lilium longiflorum, a species of flowering plant in the lily family, commonly called Easter lily
- Zephyranthes atamasco, Atamasco lily or Zephyr lily, a flowering plant, also called Easter lily in the United States
- Zantedeschia aethiopica, Calla lily, a flowering plant, called Easter lily in Ireland
- Echinopsis chiloensis, Easter lily cactus
- Amaryllis, A genus of flowering plants native to Africa, called Easter lilies in Australia

== See also ==
- Lilium formosanum, Formosa lily, a close relative of L. longiflorum
- Easter (disambiguation)
- Lily (disambiguation)
