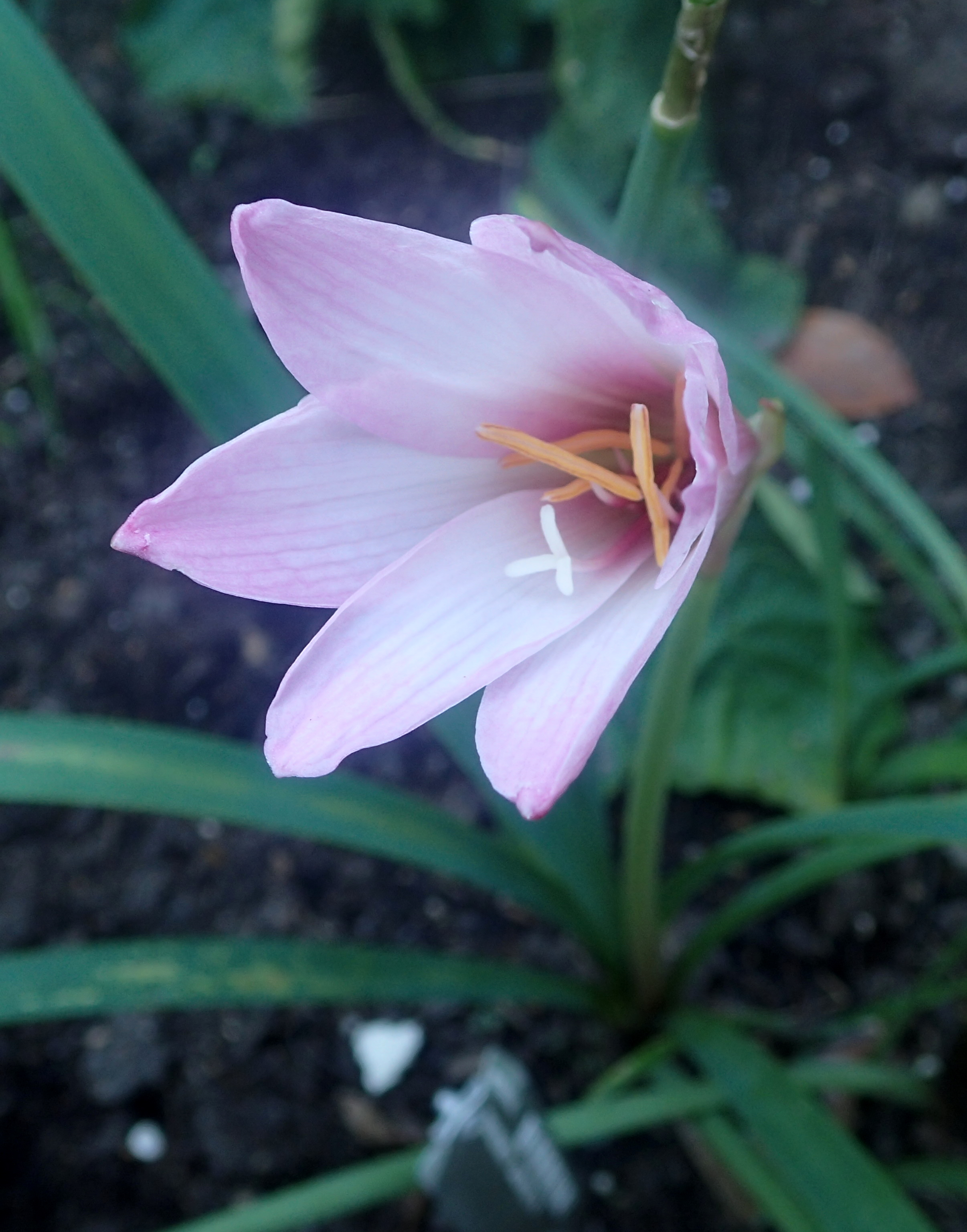
- Close-up of flower
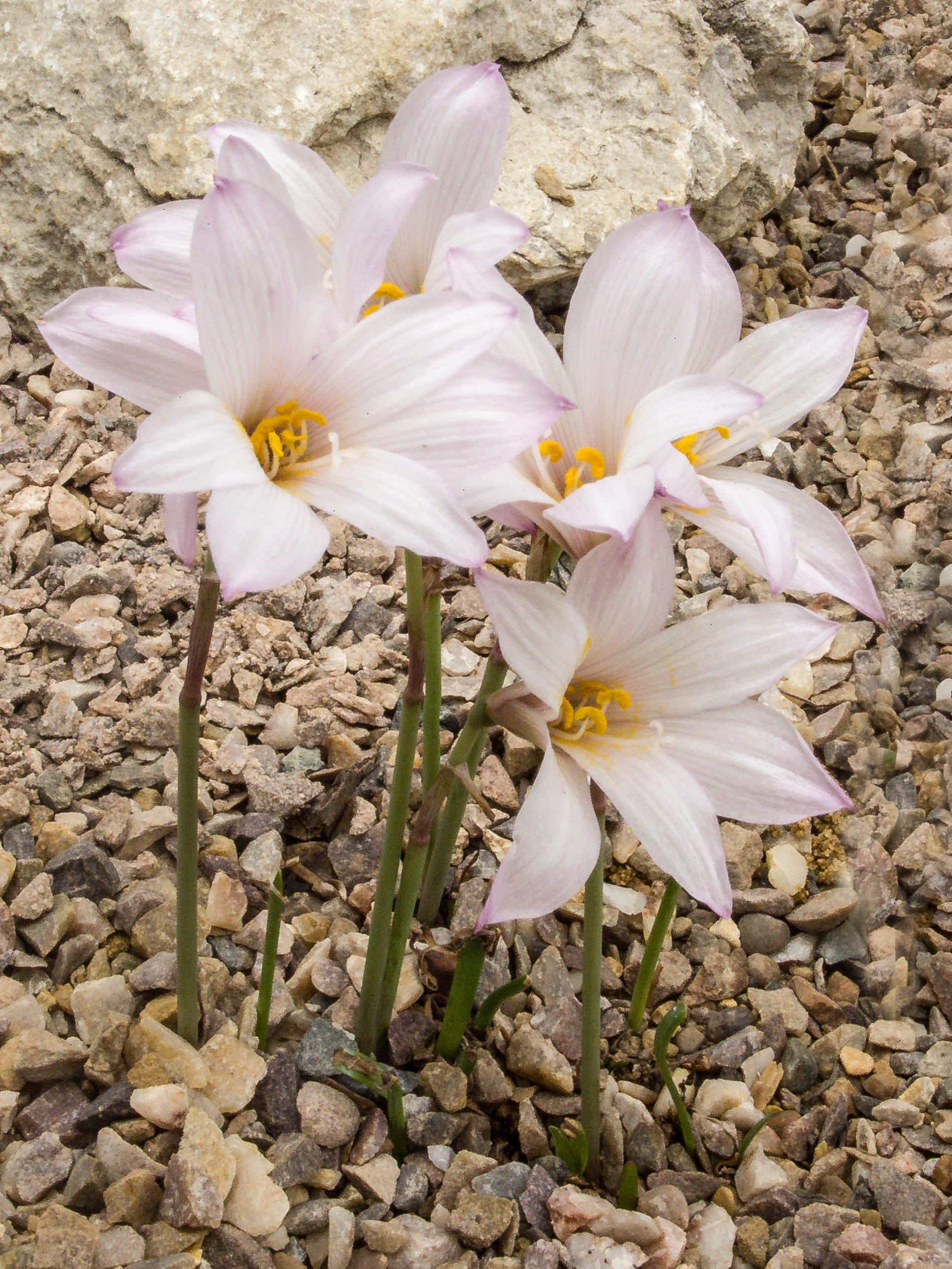
- At the Cambridge University Botanic Garden

Scientific classification
- Kingdom: Plantae
- Clade: Embryophytes
- Clade: Tracheophytes
- Clade: Spermatophytes
- Clade: Angiosperms
- Clade: Monocots
- Order: Asparagales
- Family: Amaryllidaceae
- Subfamily: Amaryllidoideae
- Genus: Zephyranthes
- Species: Z. martinezii

Binomial name
- Zephyranthes martinezii (Ravenna) Nic.García

Synonyms
- Habranthus martinezii Ravenna; Hippeastrum martinezii (Ravenna) Christenh. & Byng

= Zephyranthes martinezii =

Species of flowering plant

Zephyranthes martinezii (syn. Habranthus martinezii), is a species of flowering plant in the rain lily genus Zephyranthes, family Amaryllidaceae, native to northern Argentina. As its synonym Habranthus martinezii it has gained the Royal Horticultural Society's Award of Garden Merit.
