= Crinine =

Names
- IUPAC name (1S,13R,15R)-5,7-dioxa-12-azapentacyclo[10.5.2.0^{1,13}.0^{2,10}.0^{4,8}]nonadeca-2,4(8),9,16-tetraen-15-ol
- Other names Crinidine

Identifiers
CAS Number	510-67-8
3D model (JSmol)	Interactive image
ChEBI	CHEBI:31437
ChEMBL	ChEMBL1221864
ChemSpider	353636
KEGG	C12152
PubChem CID	398937
- InChI: InChI=1S/C16H17NO3/c18-11-1-2-16-3-4-17(15(16)6-11)8-10-5-13-14(7-12(10)16)20-9-19-13/h1-2,5,7,11,15,18H,3-4,6,8-9H2/t11-,15+,16+/m0/s1 Key: RPAORVSEYNOMBR-IUIKQTSFSA-N
- SMILES: C1CN2CC3=CC4=C(C=C3[C@]15[C@H]2C[C@H](C=C5)O)OCO4

Properties
Chemical formula	C_{16}H_{17}NO_{3}
Molar mass	271.316 g·mol^{−1}
- Except where otherwise noted, data are given for materials in their standard state (at 25 °C [77 °F], 100 kPa). Infobox references

Crinine in an alkaloid found in a variety of plants including many species in the family Amaryllidaceae. It was first isolated and characterized in the 1950s as a constituent of several plants in the genus Crinum, from which it derives its name.

Several laboratory syntheses of crinine have been reported.

== Related compounds ==
There are many alkaloids with a chemical structure similar to crinine and they are generally referred to as crinine-type alkaloids. As of 2020, there were at least 85 known crinine-type alkaloids.

Chemical structures of selected crinine-type alkaloids

Buphasine

Macowine

Augustisine

Amaryllisine

Buphanidrine

Haemanthamine
