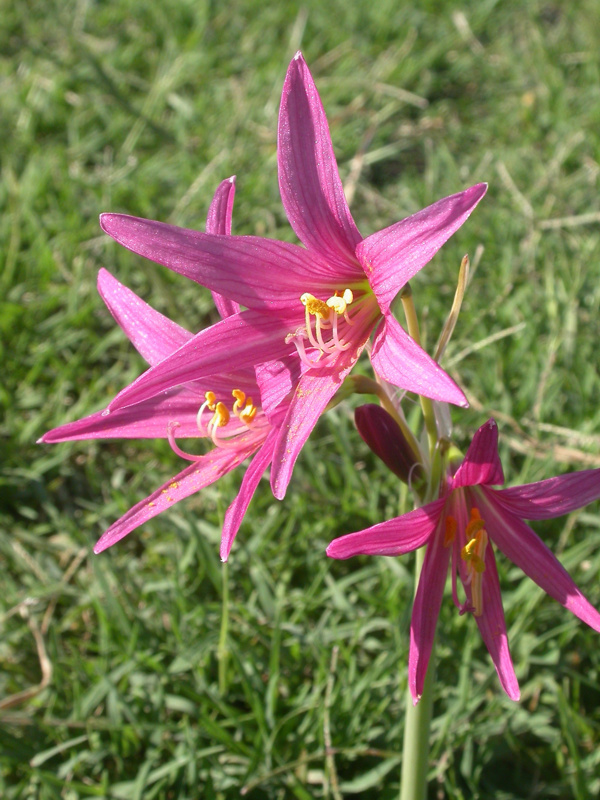
- Zephyranthes bifida flower

Scientific classification
- Kingdom: Plantae
- Clade: Tracheophytes
- Clade: Angiosperms
- Clade: Monocots
- Order: Asparagales
- Family: Amaryllidaceae
- Subfamily: Amaryllidoideae
- Genus: Zephyranthes
- Species: Z. bifida

Binomial name
- Zephyranthes bifida (Herb.) Nic.García & Meerow

Synonyms
- List: Amaryllis bifida (Herb.) Spreng.; Habranthus bifidus Herb.; Hippeastrum bifidum (Herb.) Baker; Myostemma bifida (Herb.) Ravenna; Rhodophiala bifida (Herb.) Traub; Amaryllis angusta (Herb.) Schult. & Schult.f.; Amaryllis bifida var. pulchra (Herb.) Traub & Moldenke; Amaryllis bifida var. spathacea (Herb.) Traub & Moldenke; Amaryllis bonariensis (Kuntze) Traub & Uphof; Amaryllis granatiflora (E.Holmb.) Traub & Uphof; Amaryllis intermedia Lindl.; Amaryllis kermesiana var. nemoralis (Herb.) Seub.; Amaryllis kermesina Lindl.; Amaryllis lorifolia (Herb.) Steud.; Amaryllis platensis (E.Holmb.) Traub & Uphof; Amaryllis pulchra (Herb.) Traub & Uphof; Habranthus angustus Herb.; Habranthus bifidus var. litoralis Herb.; Habranthus intermedius Herb.; Habranthus kermesinus (Lindl.) Herb.; Habranthus litoralis (Herb.) M.Roem.; Habranthus lorifolius Herb.; Habranthus nemoralis Herb.; Habranthus nobilis Herb.; Habranthus pulcher Herb.; Habranthus spathaceus Herb.; Habranthus spathaceus var. angustus (Herb.) Herb.; Hippeastrum bifidum var. spathaceum (Herb.) H.E.Moore; Hippeastrum bonariense Kuntze; Hippeastrum granatiflorum E.Holmb.; Hippeastrum kermesinum (Lindl.) Herter; Hippeastrum nemorale (Herb.) Herter; Hippeastrum platense E.Holmb.; Hippeastrum platense var. angustum (Herb.) E.Holmb.; Hippeastrum pulchrum (Herb.) E.Holmb.; Myostemma bifida f. granatiflora (E.Holmb.) Ravenna; Phycella bonariensis (Kuntze) Traub; Phycella granatiflora (E.Holmb.) Traub; Rhodophiala bifida subsp. aemantha Ravenna; Rhodophiala bifida subsp. granatiflora (E.Holmb.) Ravenna; Rhodophiala bifida var. pulchra (Herb.) Traub; Rhodophiala bifida subsp. purpurea Ravenna; Rhodophiala bifida var. spathacea (Herb.) Traub; Rhodophiala spathacea (Herb.) Traub

= Zephyranthes bifida =

Species of flowering plant

Zephyranthes bifida, formerly Rhodophiala bifida and commonly the oxblood lily or schoolhouse lily, is a species of bulbous, terrestrial herb in the family Amaryllidaceae native to Argentina, Bolivia, Brazil, and Uruguay. it is cultivated in the Southern United States as an ornamental plant for its pink to red flowers.

== Description ==
=== Vegetative characteristics ===
Zephyranthes bifida is a 15–40 cm tall, bulbous, terrestrial herb with ovoid to globose bulbs and green, linear, 15–30 cm long, and 3–7 mm wide leaves with an obtuse apex.

=== Generative characteristics ===
The androecium consists of 6 stamens. The stigma is trifid. The capsule fruit is 1.2–3 cm wide.

== Cytology ==
The chromosome count is 2n = 16 or 2n = 18.

== Taxonomy ==
It was first published as Habranthus bifidus Herb. by William Herbert in 1825. Long known as and still often called Rhodophiala bifida, it was placed into the genus Zephyranthes Herb. as Zephyranthes bifida (Herb.) Nic.García & Meerow by Nicolás García Berguecio and Alan W. Meerow in 2019. It is placed in the monotypic subgenus Zephyranthes subg. Neorhodophiala.

== Distribution ==
It is native to Argentina, Bolivia, Brazil, and Uruguay.

== Cultivation ==
Z. bifida is found in cultivation. In the U.S., plants were first imported from Argentina popularized by a German immigrant to the Texas Hill Country. From Texas, they were distributed throughout the South as an heirloom plant. The cultivar from Texas, sometimes called 'Hill Country Red', typically has dark red flowers (hence the name oxblood lily) with flowers blooming with autumn rains before the appearance of leaves.
