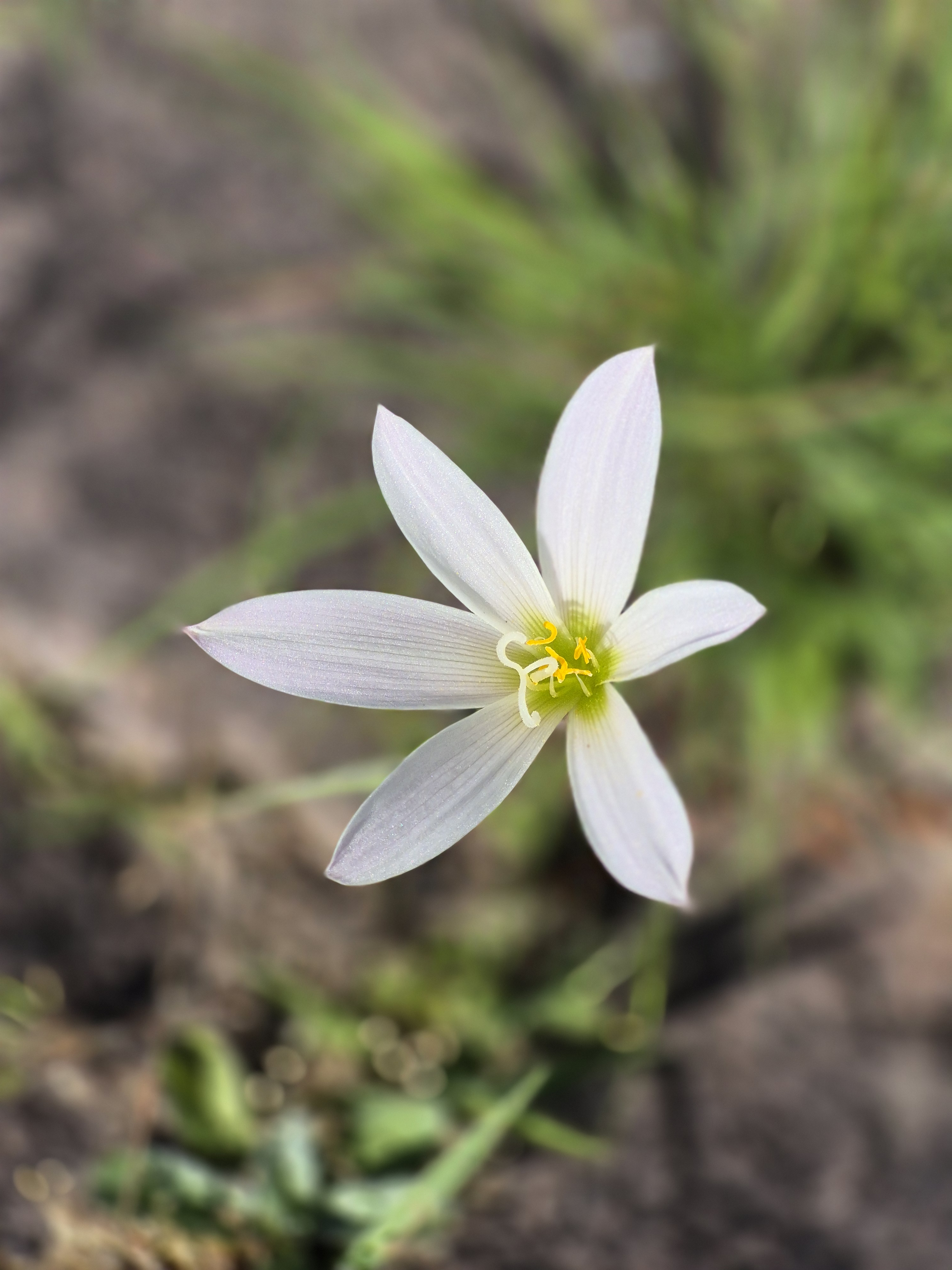
- Flower in Brazil
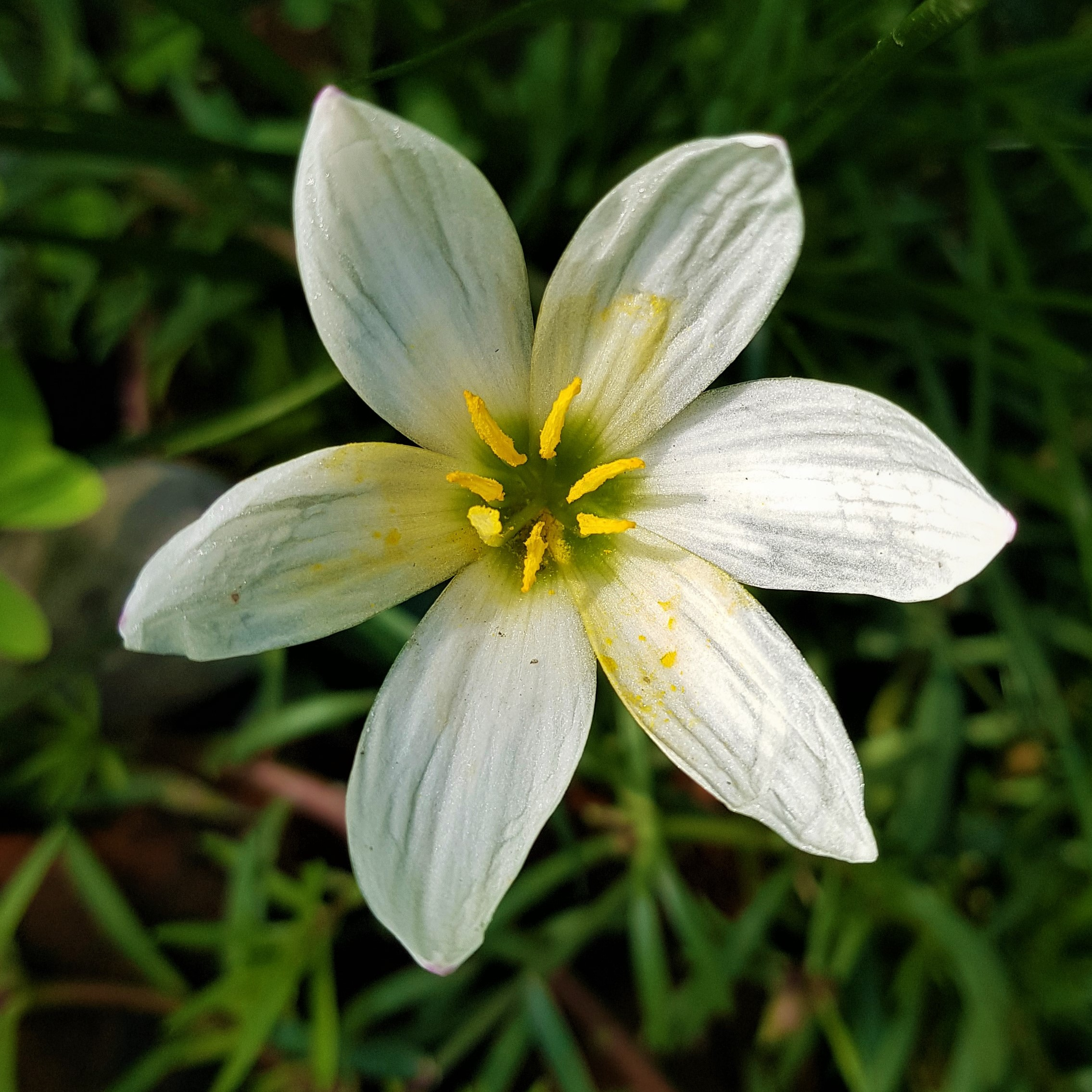

Scientific classification
- Kingdom: Plantae
- Clade: Embryophytes
- Clade: Tracheophytes
- Clade: Spermatophytes
- Clade: Angiosperms
- Clade: Monocots
- Order: Asparagales
- Family: Amaryllidaceae
- Subfamily: Amaryllidoideae
- Genus: Zephyranthes
- Species: Z. candida

Binomial name
- Zephyranthes candida (Lindl.) Herb.

Synonyms
- Amaryllis candida Lindl.; Amaryllis nivea Schult. & Schult.f.; Argyropsis candida (Lindl.) M.Roem.; Atamosco candida (Lindl.) Sasaki; Plectronema candida (Lindl.) Raf.; Zephyranthes nivea (Schult. & Schult.f.) D.Dietr.

= Zephyranthes candida =

Species of plant

Zephyranthes candida, with common names that include autumn zephyrlily, white windflower, white rain lily, and Peruvian swamp lily, is a species of rain lily native to South America including Argentina, Uruguay, Paraguay, and Brazil. The species is widely cultivated as an ornamental and reportedly naturalized in many places (South Africa, the Indian subcontinent, Zimbabwe, Seychelles, central and southern China, Korea, Nansei-shoto (Ryukyu Islands), Bhutan, Solomon Islands, Queensland, Nauru, Tonga, Society Islands, Mariana Islands, southeastern United States (from Texas to North Carolina), the Lesser Antilles, and Peru).

== Description ==
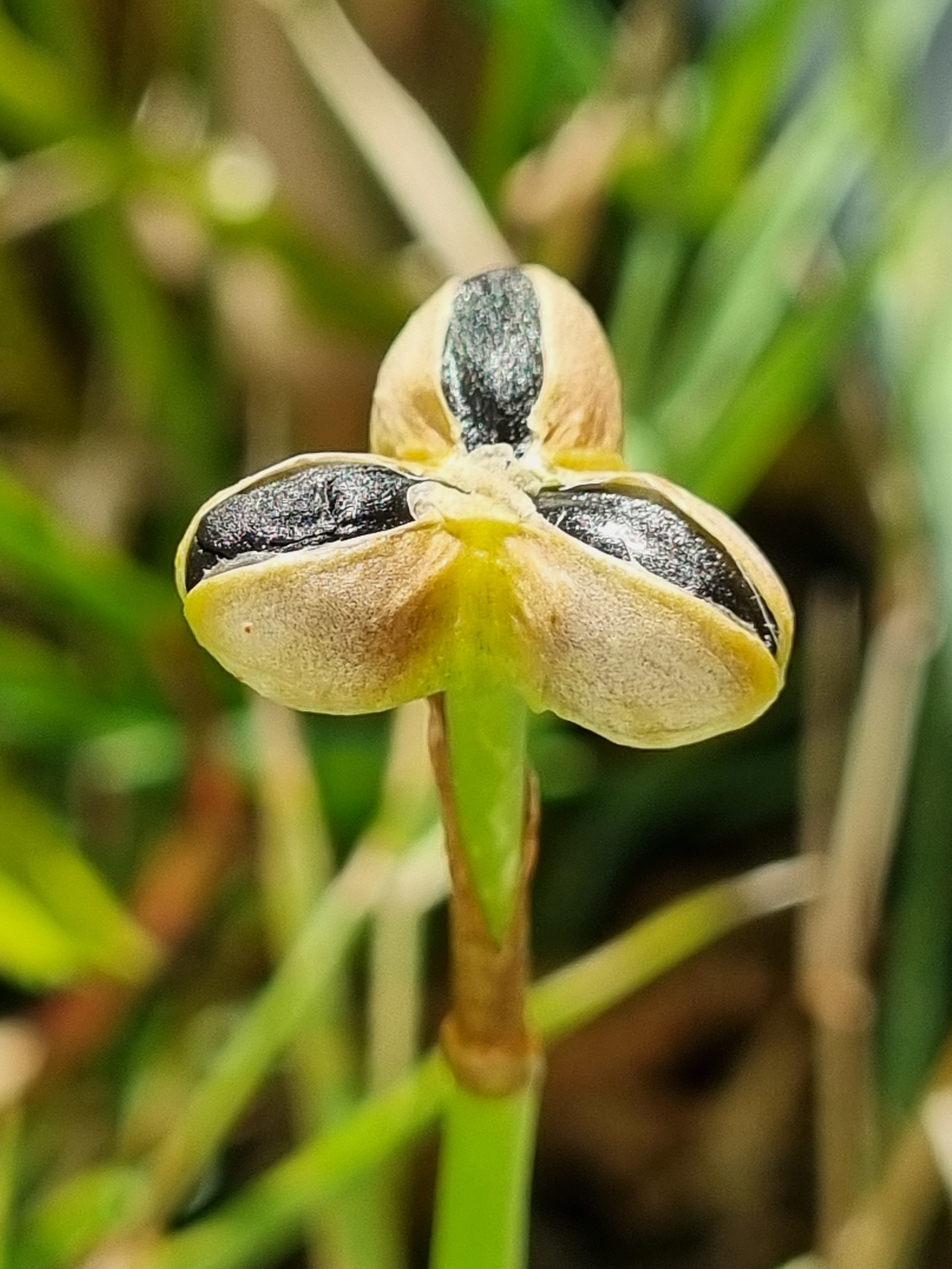
Zephyranthes candida Herb. capsule fruit

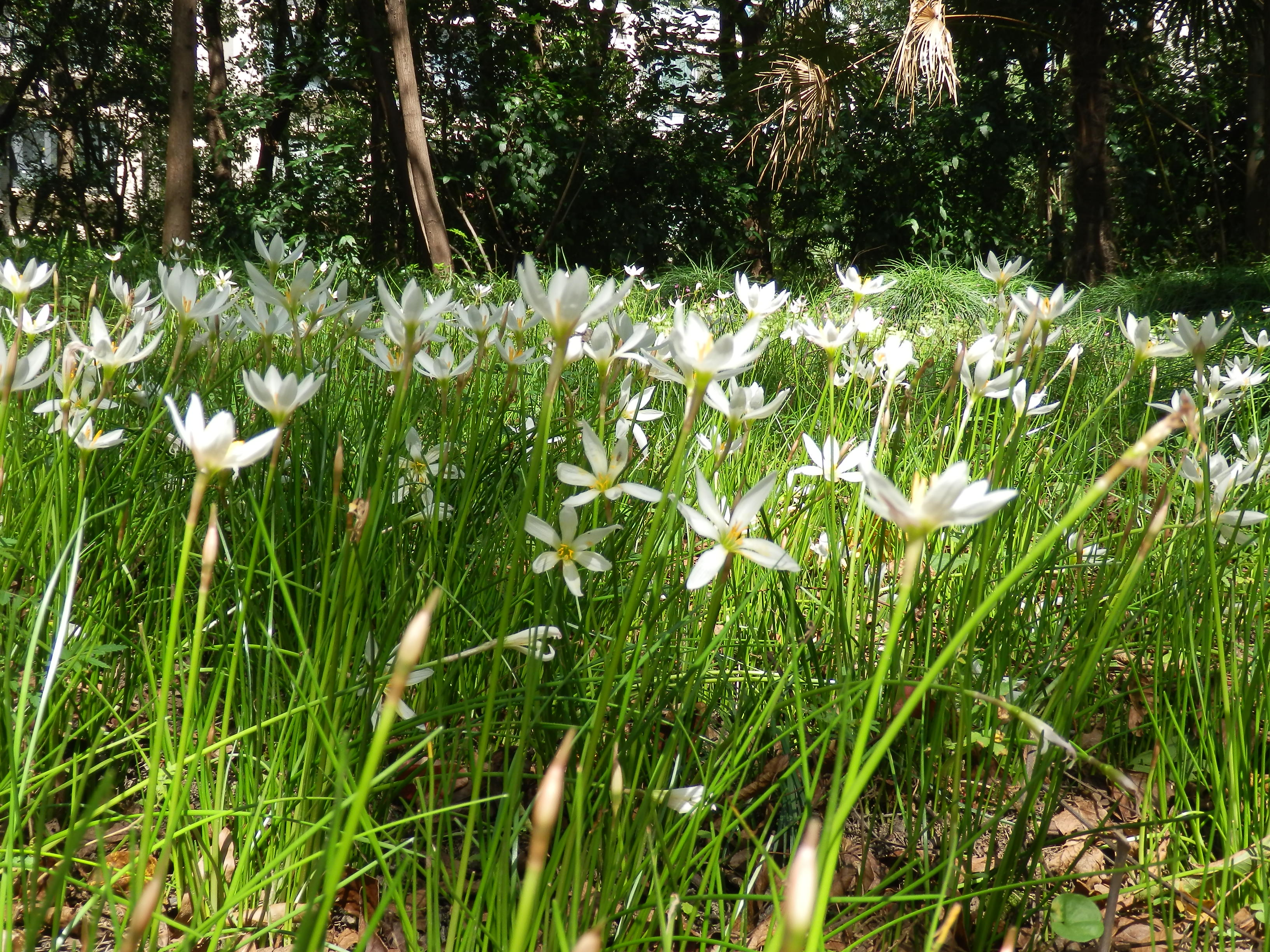
Zephyranthes candida flowering

Leaves are a deep glossy green and measure 3 mm wide. Flowers, which bud late in August (when propagated in the Northern Hemisphere) at first resemble a new leaf, but emerge from their papery sheaves to a stunning whiteness; they are erect in perianth white and sometimes pinkish abaxially. The leaf-like bract is 1.8 to 4 cm. They grow best in full sun to part shade and require a medium wet soil. Propagation is done by dividing bulbs or offsets and from seed.

== Taxonomy ==
Zephyranthes candida was first described by John Lindley in 1823 as Amaryllis candida. It was transferred to its current genus in 1826 by William Herbert. Other common names of Zephyranthes candida include August rain lily, white zephyr lily, white fairy lily, white rain lily, and autumn zephyr lily.

== Cultivation ==
Hardiness: USDA zones 7-10.

== Chemical constituents ==
It contains lycorine, nerinine, haemanthamine, tazettine, haemanthidine, zephyranthine.

== Gallery ==
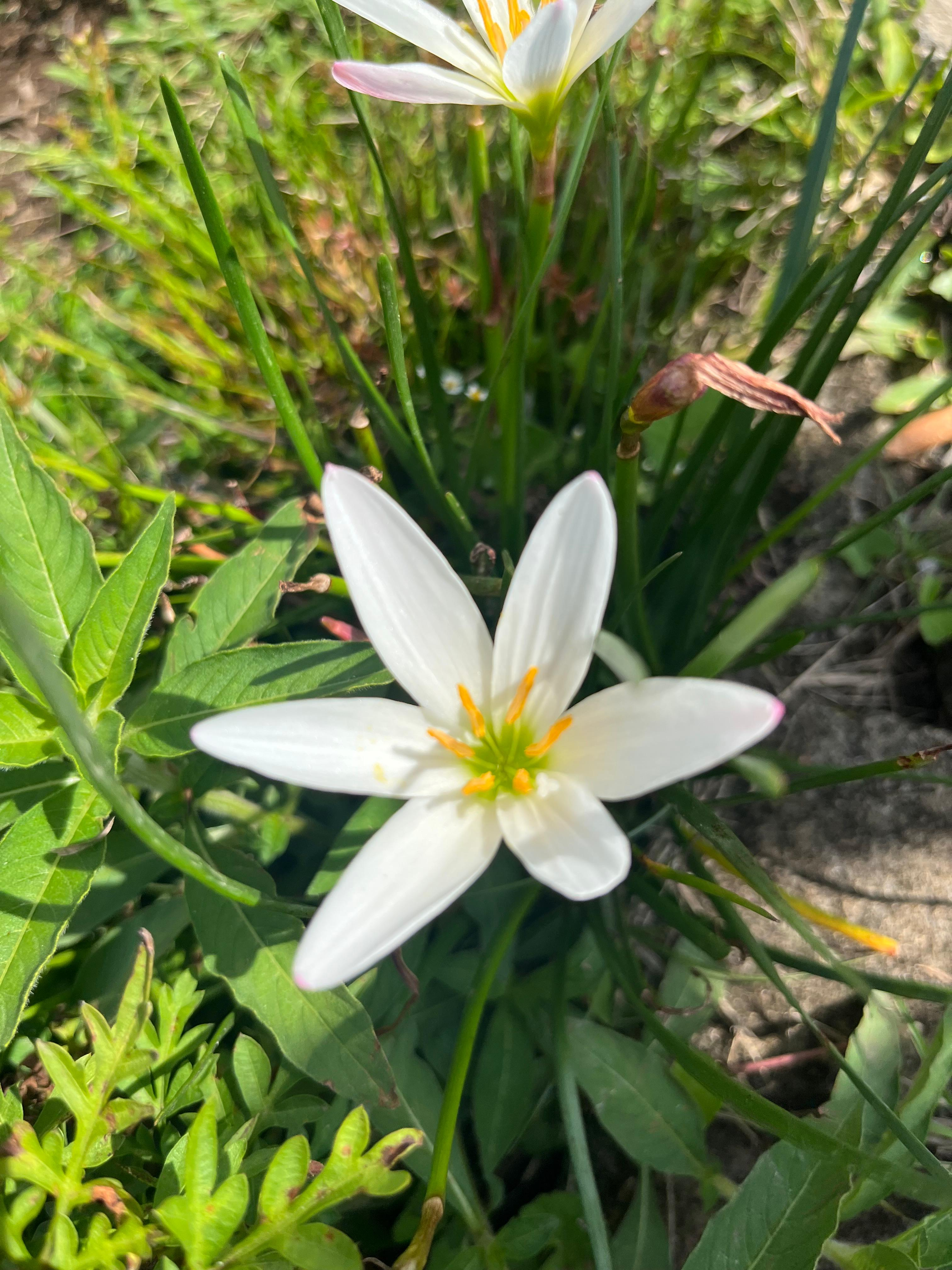
Flower in Indonesian

== See also ==
- List of plants known as lily
