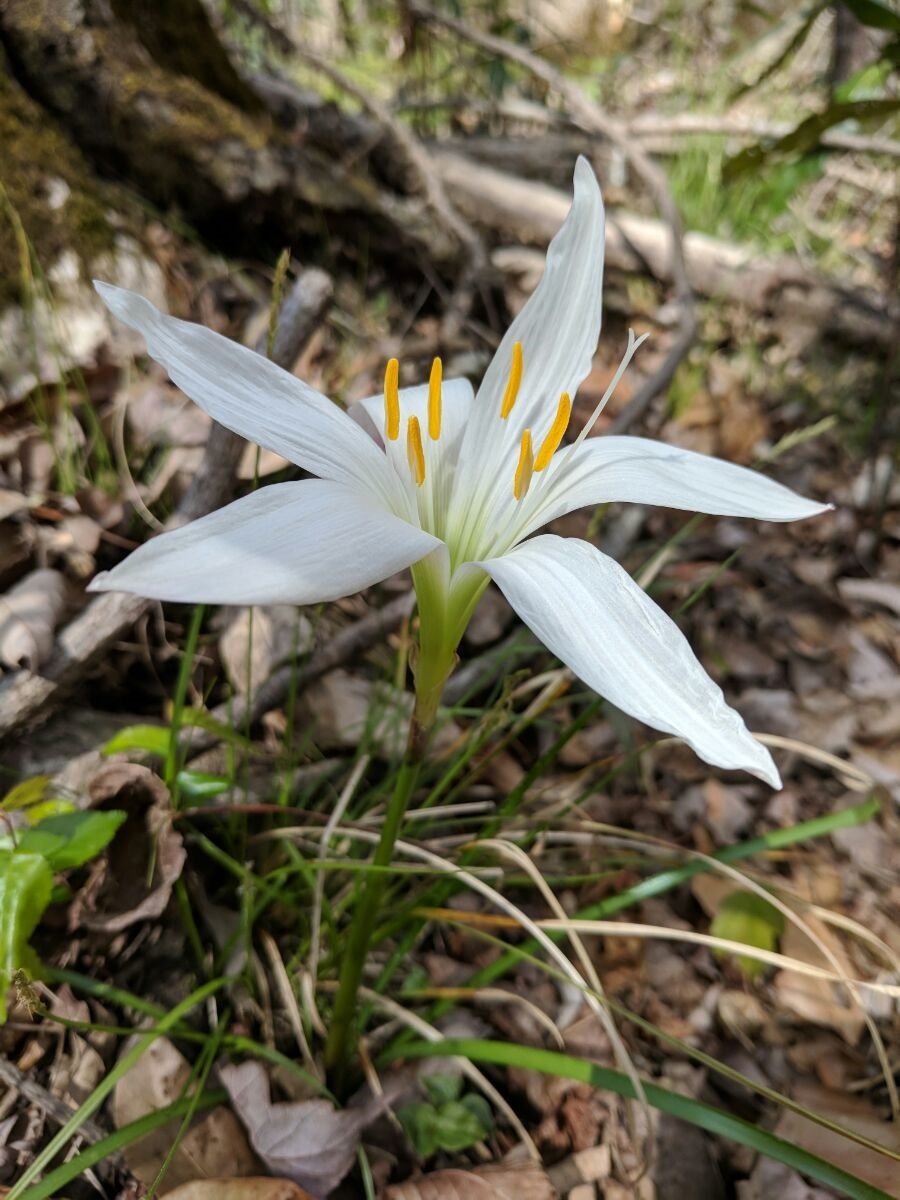

Scientific classification
- Kingdom: Plantae
- Clade: Tracheophytes
- Clade: Angiosperms
- Clade: Monocots
- Order: Asparagales
- Family: Amaryllidaceae
- Subfamily: Amaryllidoideae
- Subtribe: Hippeastrinae
- Genus: Zephyranthes
- Subgenus: Zephyranthes subg. Zephyranthes
- Species: Z. atamasca

Binomial name
- Zephyranthes atamasca (L.) Herb.

Synonyms
- See article

= Zephyranthes atamasca =

Atamasco lily

Species of plant

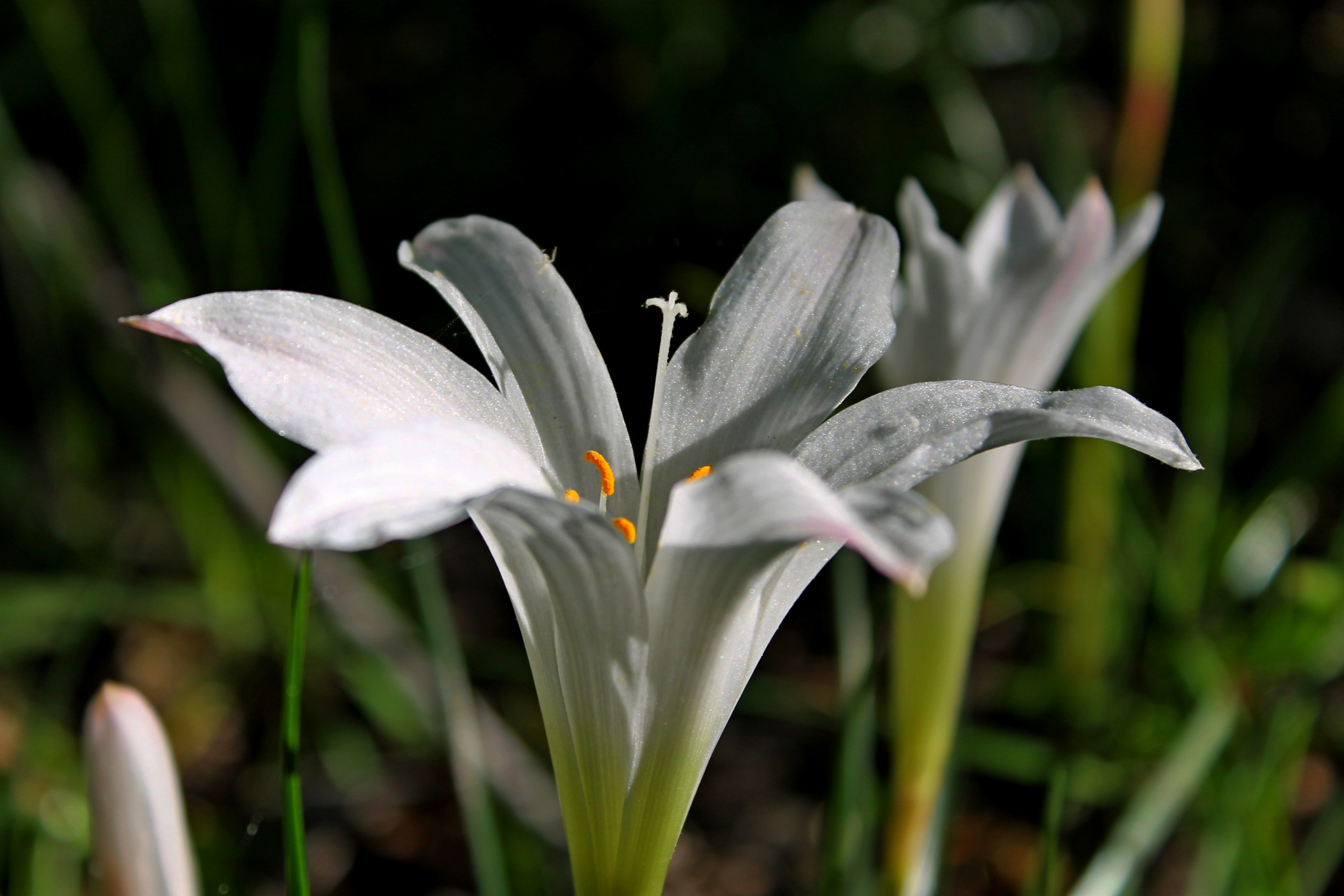
Flower close-up

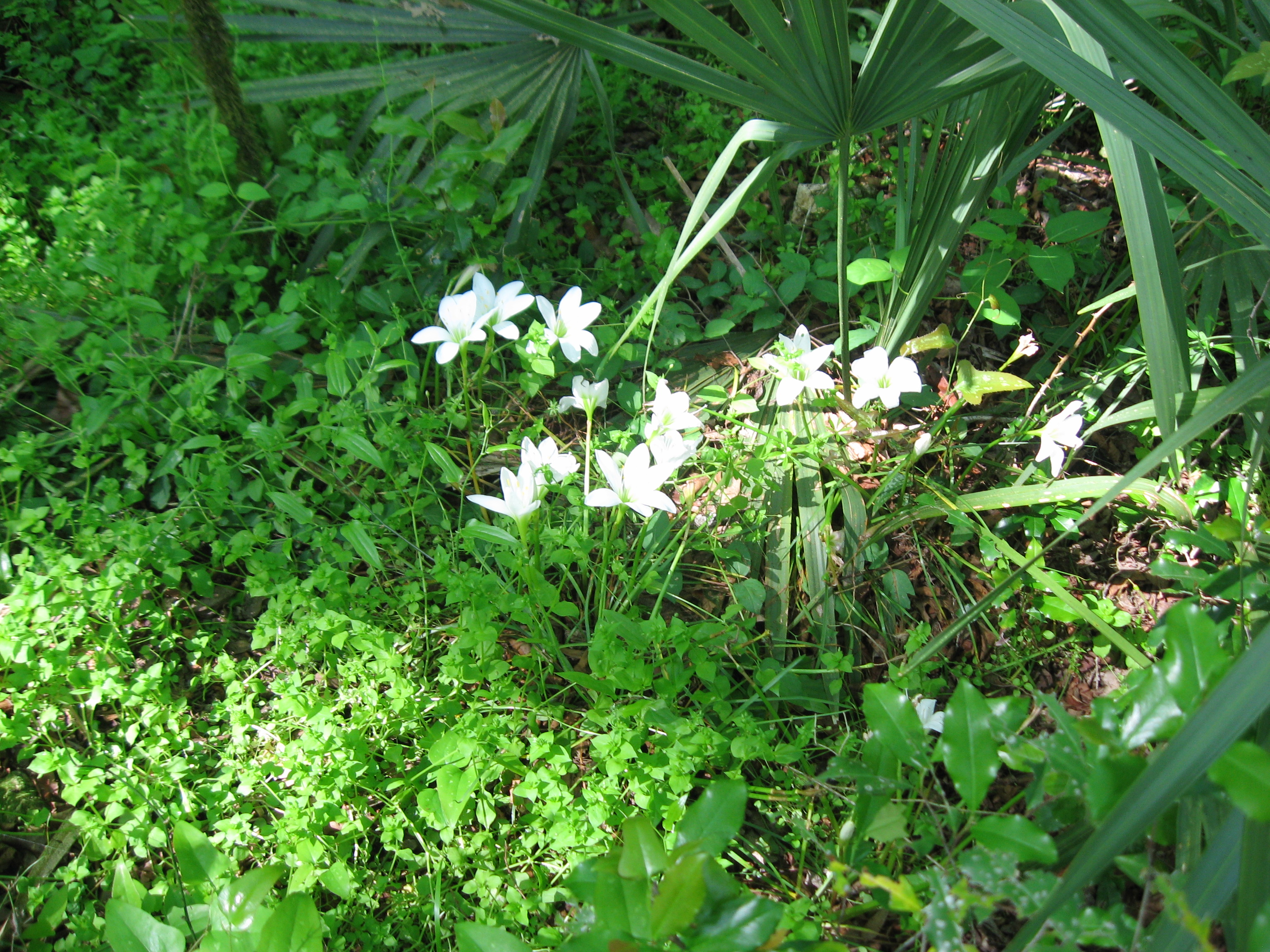
Atamasco or rain lilies blooming near the entrance to the caves at Florida Caverns State Park

Zephyranthes atamasca, commonly known as the atamasco lily, occasionally as the Easter lily (Note: "Easter lily" more commonly refers to Lilium longiflorum.) or more generally a rain-lily, (Note: "Rain lily" refers to many other Zephyranthes species as well.) is native to the Southern United States. It grows in swampy forests and coastal prairies, preferring acid boggy soils rich with leaf mold. Following the appearance of broad, grassy leaves in early winter, it blooms in March or April. It has several narrow, linear basal leaves about 0.5 in (13 mm) wide and 10–15 in (25–38 cm) long. Its native range extends from Florida north to Maryland and west to Mississippi. The species is also naturalized in Bermuda and in the Mariana Islands. Both its leaves and bulbs are poisonous.

== Taxonomy ==
The scientific name of this species has a somewhat complex history. In 1753, in the first edition of Species Plantarum, Carl Linnaeus placed it in the genus Amaryllis using the epithet "Atamasca" (the capital "A" showing that this was intended as a noun, not an adjective). However, in the second edition of Species Plantarum, he changed the spelling to "Atamasco" (again with a capital "A"). "Atamasco" is the Native American name. When in 1821, William Herbert transferred the species to his genus Zephyranthes he used Linnaeus's later spelling for the epithet, i.e. Zephyranthes atamasco, this being the type species of the genus. Many sources have used this spelling subsequently. However, the International Code of Nomenclature for algae, fungi, and plants conserves the type of Zephyranthes using the spelling atamasca.

=== Synonyms ===
Synonyms include the following:

- Amaryllis atamasco L., orth. var.

Note: Amaryllis atamasco Blanco = Hippeastrum miniatum

- Amaryllis aramasco L., orth. var.
- Amaryllis atanasia Crantz
- Amaryllis pulchella Salisb.
- Amaryllis verecunda Salisb.
- Amaryllis virginiensis Oken
- Atamasco atamasco (L.) Greene, nom. inval.
- Zephyranthes atamasco var. minor Herb.
