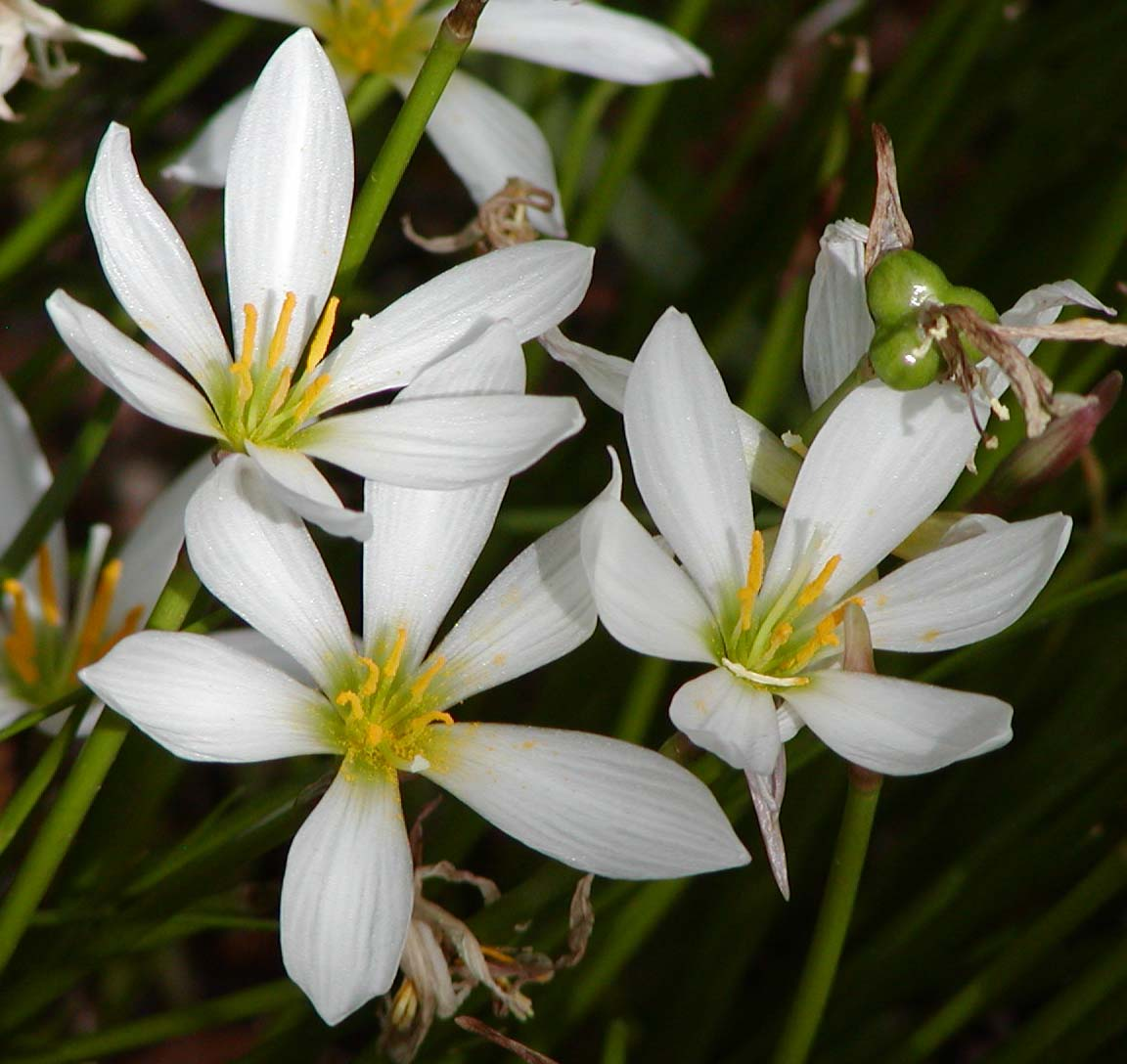
- Zephyranthes candida

Scientific classification
- Kingdom: Plantae
- Clade: Tracheophytes
- Clade: Angiosperms
- Clade: Monocots
- Order: Asparagales
- Family: Amaryllidaceae
- Subfamily: Amaryllidoideae
- Subtribe: Hippeastrinae
- Genus: Zephyranthes; Herb.

Type species
- Zephyranthes atamasco (L.) Herb.

Subgenera
- Zephyranthes subg. Eithea (Ravenna) Nic.García; Zephyranthes subg. Zephyranthes (autonym); Zephyranthes subg. Habranthus (Herb.) Nic.García; Zephyranthes subg. Neorhodophiala Nic.García & Meerow; Zephyranthes subg. Myostemma (Salisb.) Nic.García

Synonyms
- 23 synonyms: Aidema Ravenna; Argyropsis M.Roem.; Arviela Salisb.; Atamasco Raf.; Atamosco Adans.; Bathya Ravenna; × Coobranthus T.M.Howard; × Cooperanthes Percy-Lanc.; Cooperia Herb.; Eithea Ravenna; Famatina Ravenna; Habranthus Herb.; Haylockia Herb.; Mesochloa Raf.; Myostemma Salisb.; Plectronema Raf.; Pogonema Raf.; Sceptranthes Graham; × Sprekanthus Traub; Sprekelia Heist.; × Sydneya Traub; × Zephybranthus T.M.Howard; Zephyranthella (Pax) Pax

= Zephyranthes =

Genus of flowering plants

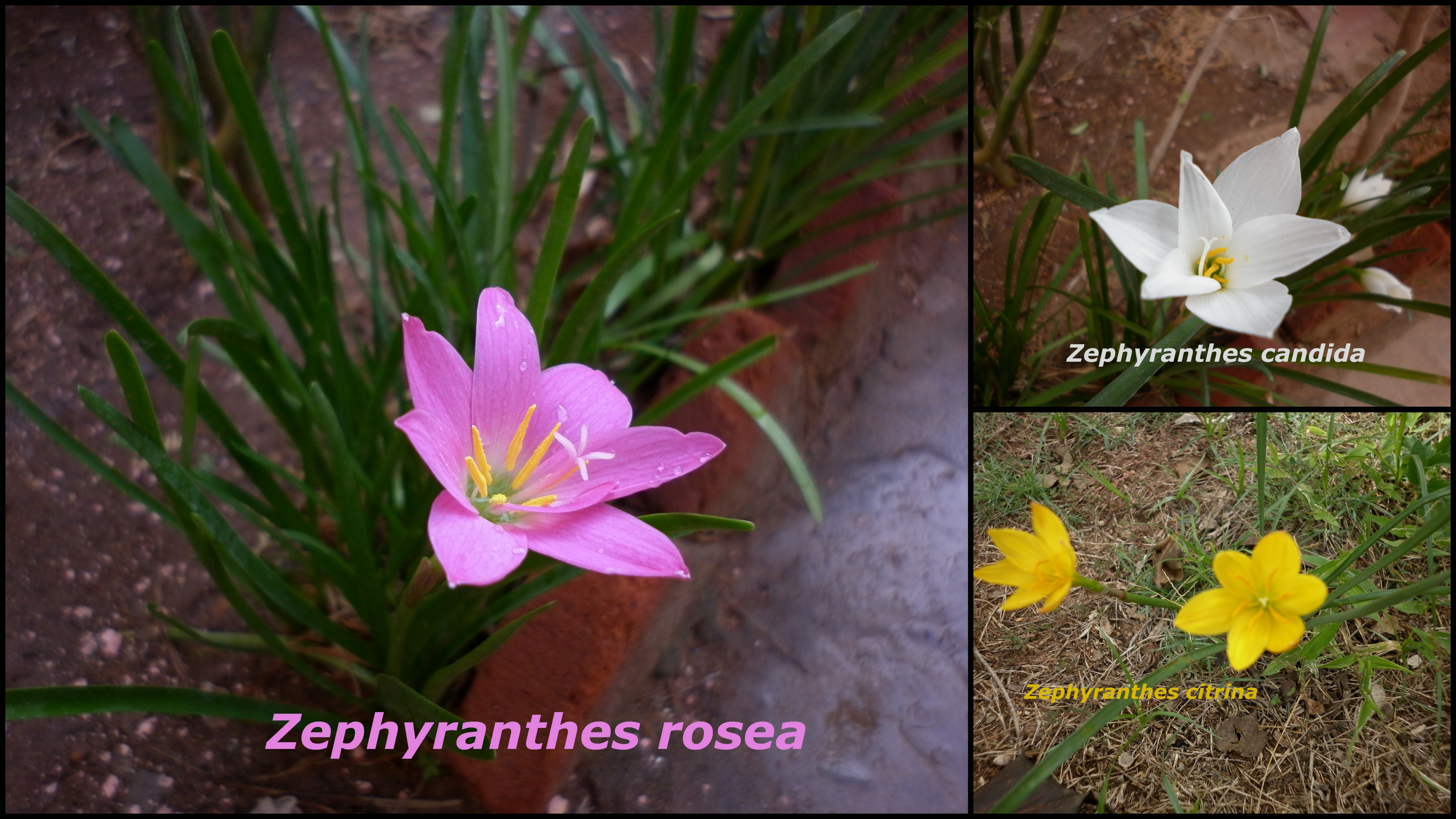
Diversity in Zephyranthes

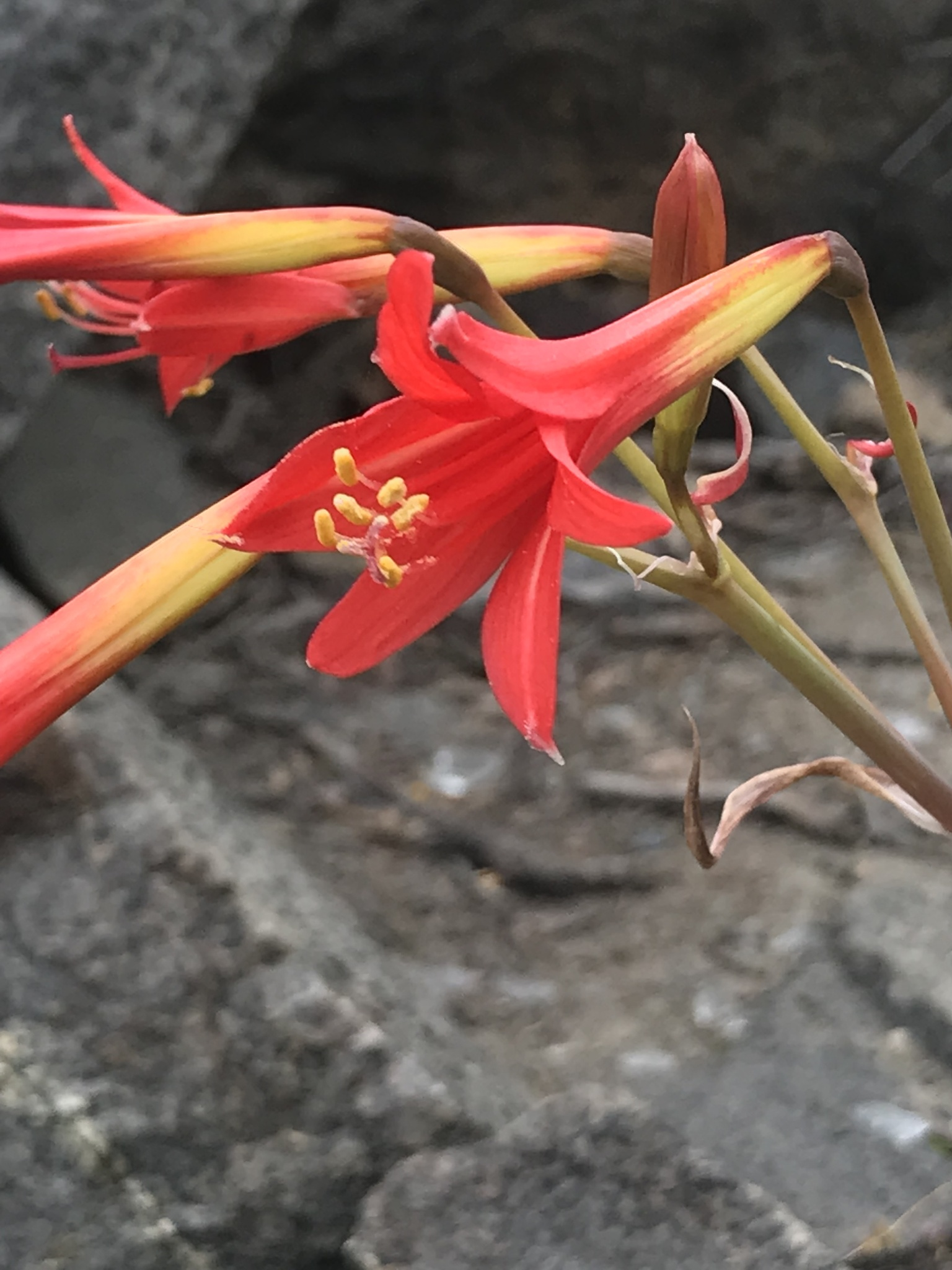
Zephyranthes phycelloides

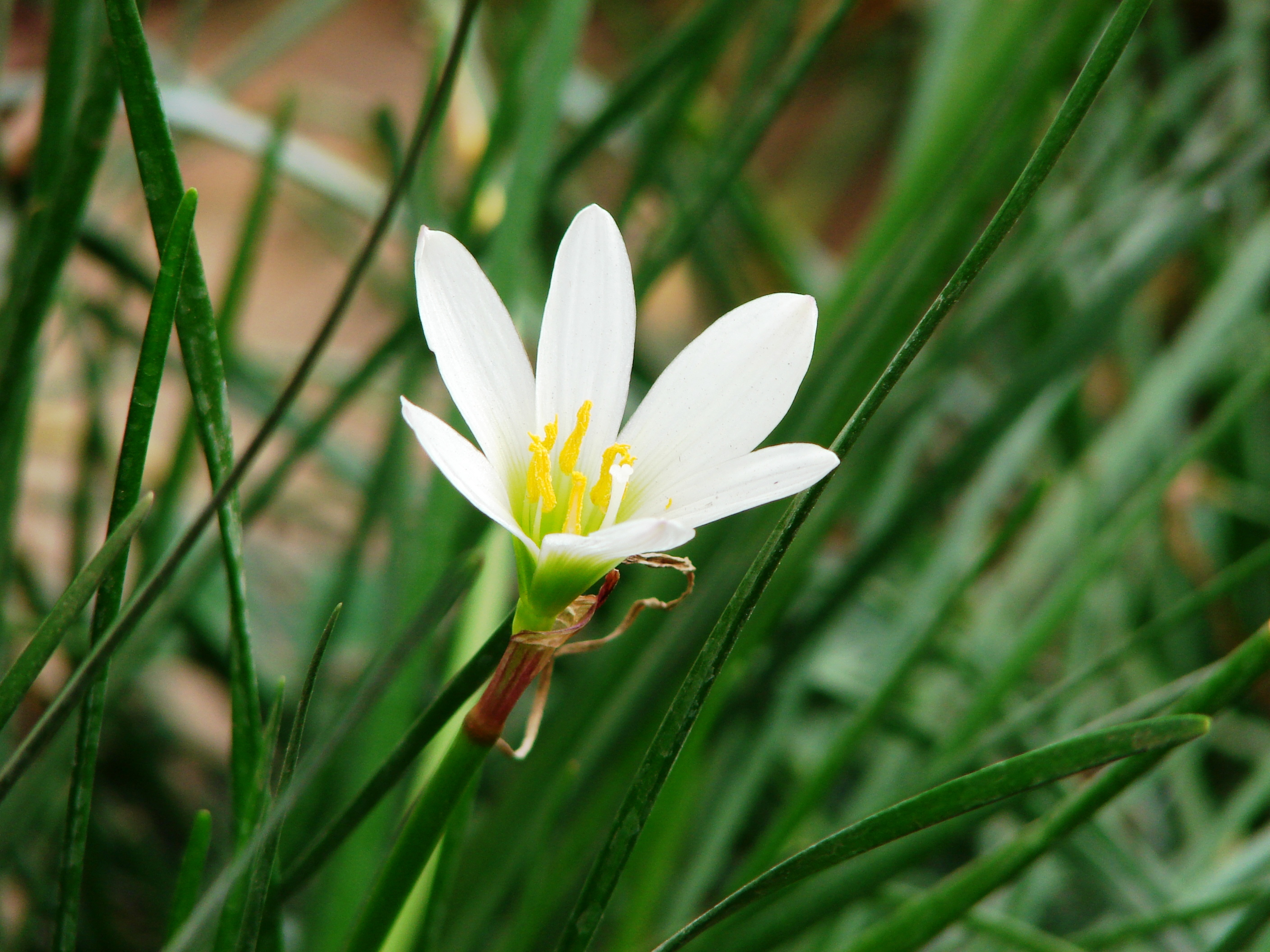
Zephyranthes candida

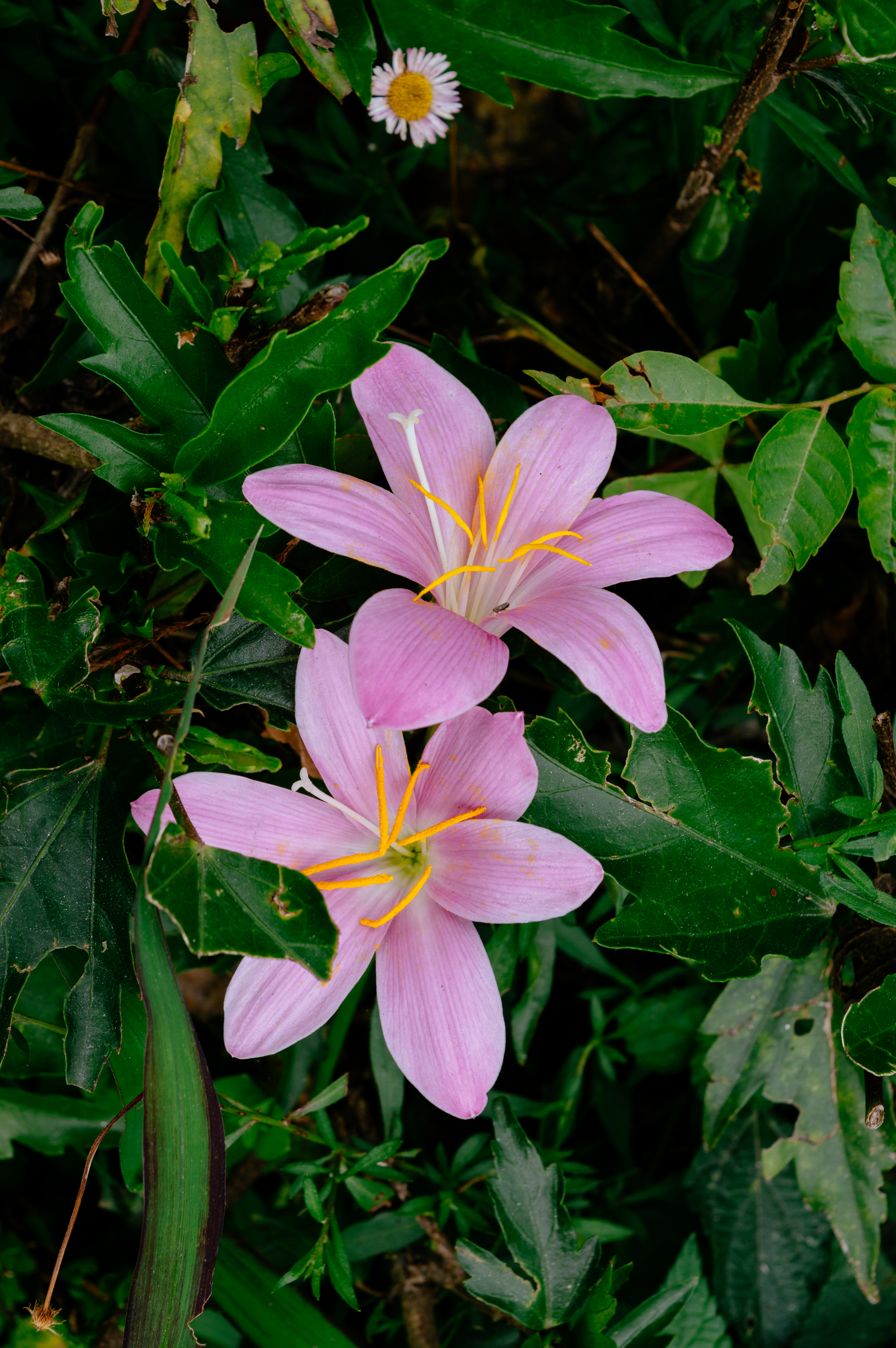
Zephyranthes carinata in Kalimpong, India

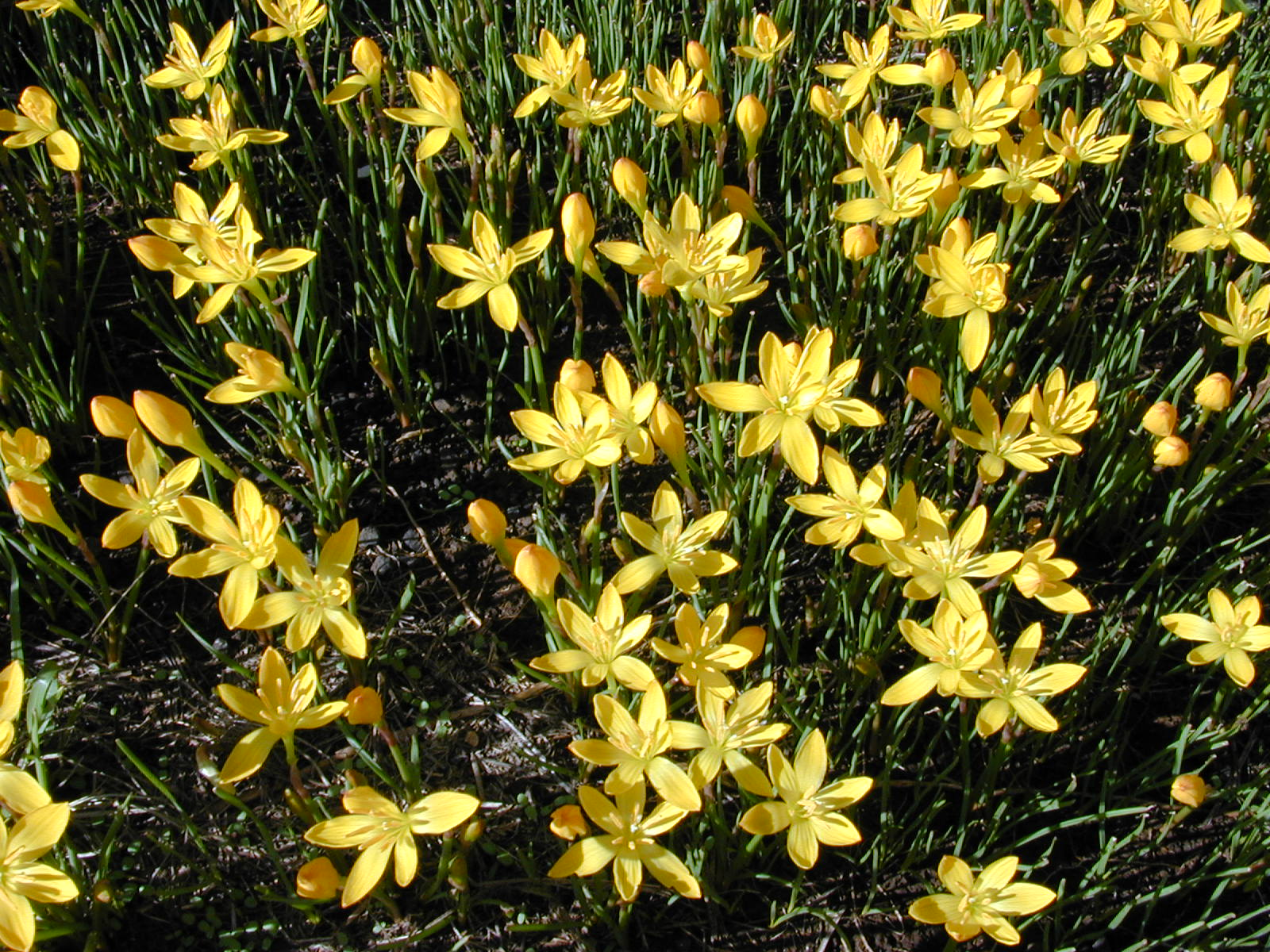
Zephyranthes citrina

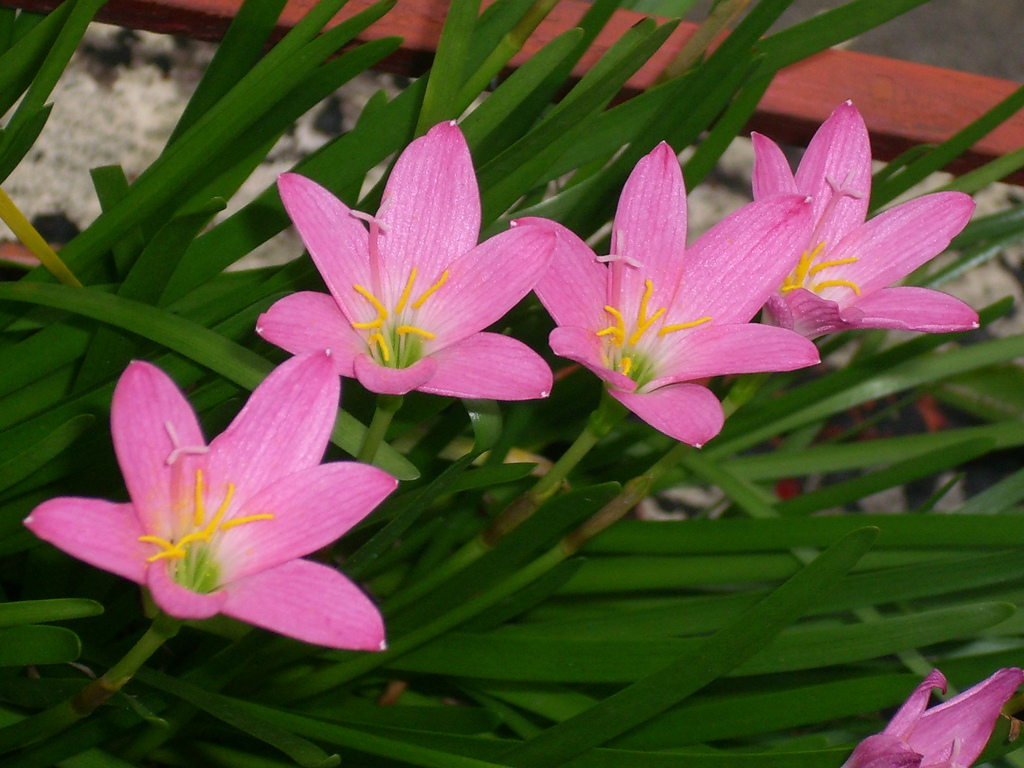
Zephyranthes rosea

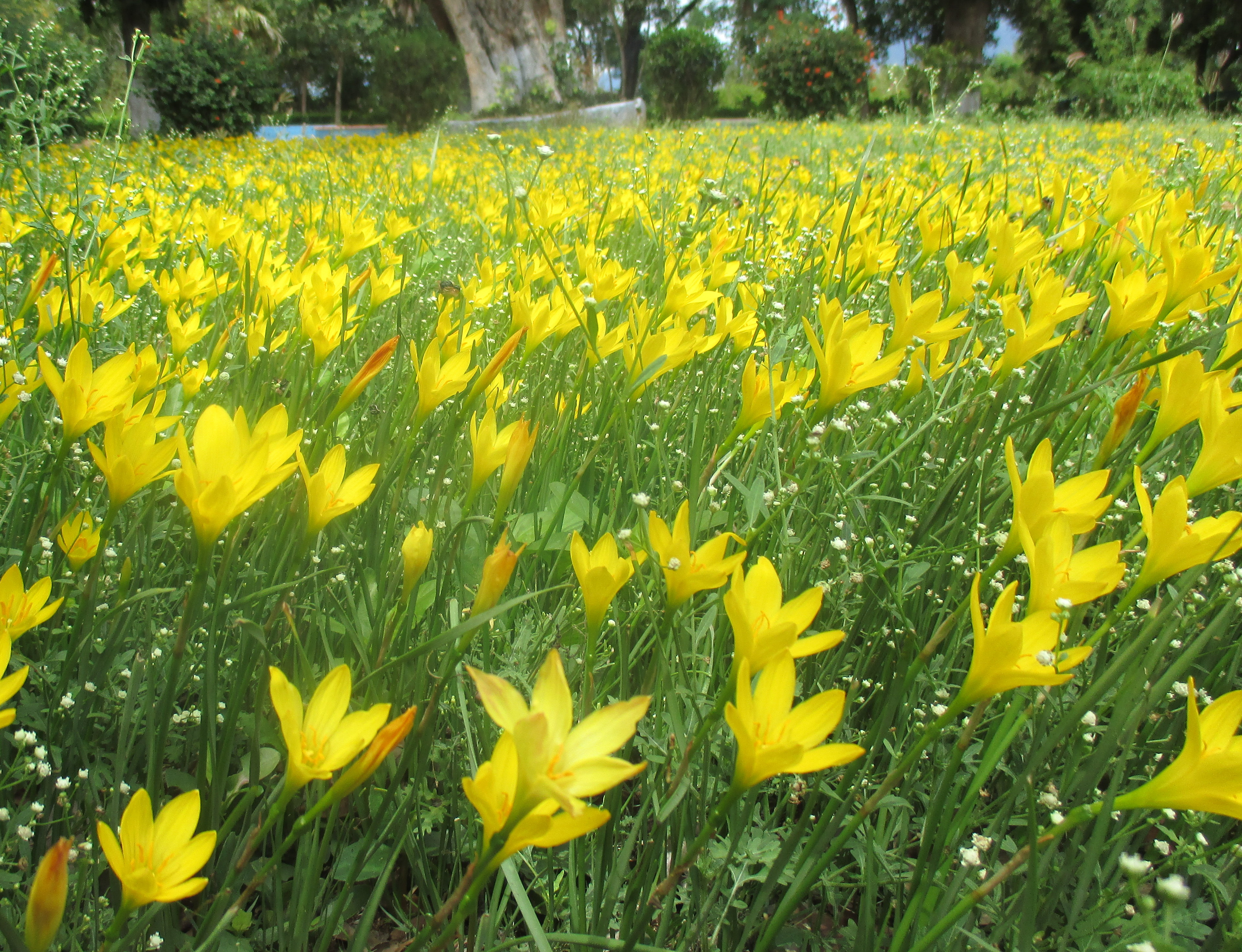
Rain lilies in TNAU Botanic Garden

Zephyranthes /ˌzɛfɪˈrænθiːz/ is a genus of temperate and tropical bulbous plants in the Amaryllis family, subfamily Amaryllidoideae, native to the Americas and widely cultivated as ornamentals. Following the expansion of the genus in 2019, which now includes the genera Habranthus and Sprekelia, there are about 200 recognized species, as well as numerous hybrids and cultivars. Common names for species in this genus include fairy lily, rainflower, zephyr lily, magic lily, Atamasco lily, and rain lily.

The name is derived from Ζέφυρος (Zephyrus), the Greek god of the west wind, and ἄνθος (anthos), meaning flower.

== Description ==
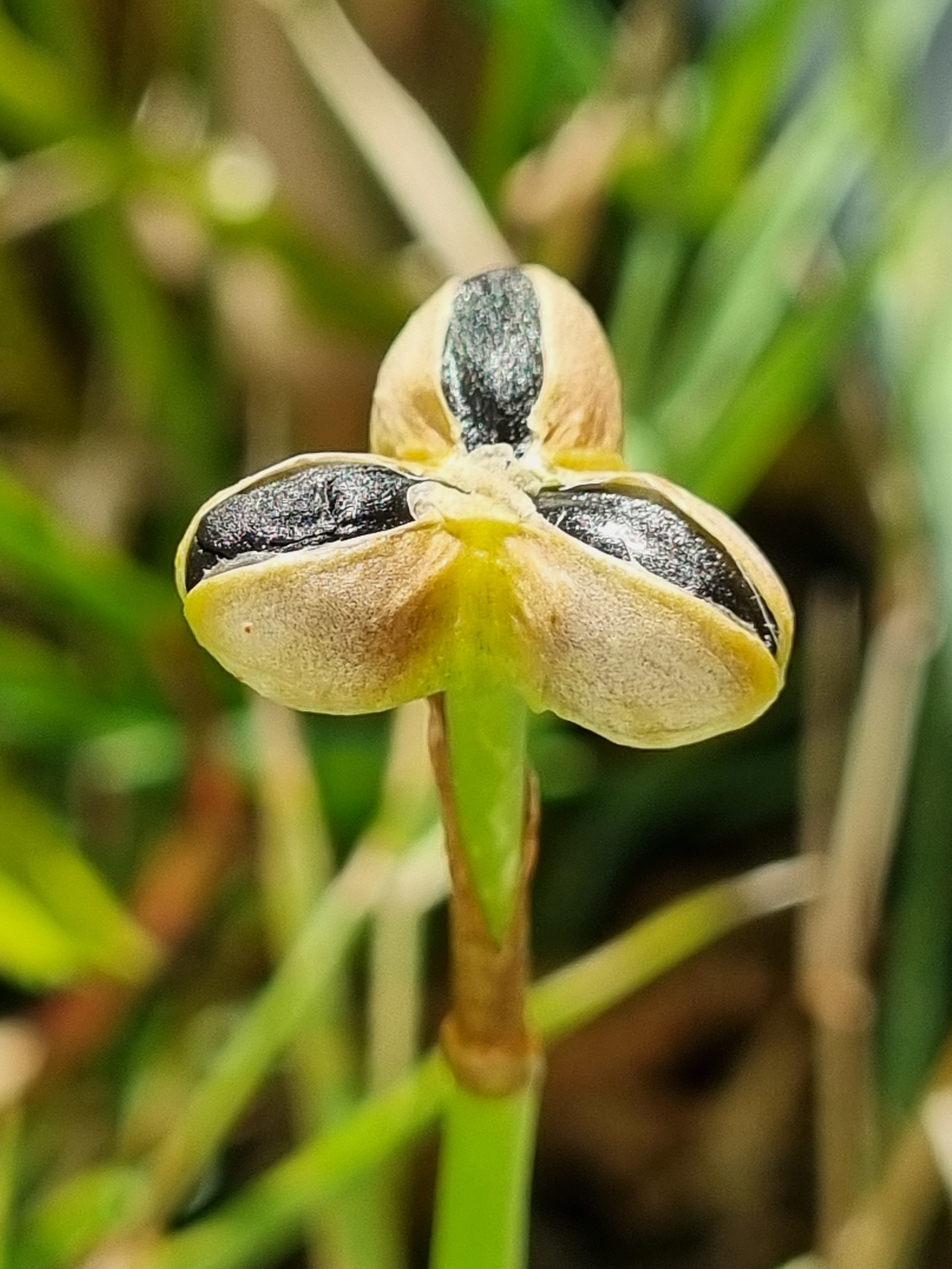
Zephyranthes candida capsule fruit

Species in the genus vary in morphology. Along with floral morphology, characteristics such as bulb size, bulb tunic color, and leaf morphology help identify individual species.

Foliage in the wild is often ephemeral, but under cultivation becomes more persistent. Leaf color ranges from the bright grassy green of Z. candida to rather broad glaucous colored foliage such as found in Z. drummondii. A few of the species have distinct bronze tints in the foliage when grown in bright light. Leaf types range from dark green and tiny grassy leaves in species like Z. jonesi or Z. longifolia, to broader, glaucous leaves in species like Z. drummondii. Perhaps the largest leaves of all are found on Z. lindleyana from Mexico, usually distributed as a cultivar called 'Horsetail Falls'; this species has handsome broad leaves almost like a Hippeastrum.

Flower color in the species ranges from white to yellow (various tints of this color from lemon to sulfur) and pink. Zephyranthes have erect flower stalks which support a flower that may be upward facing or slightly nodding. The funnel-shaped flowers with six petals can be crocus shaped, but may also open flat such as in Z. jonesii or even reflex slightly.

The flowers of some species have a sweet, pleasant fragrance. Fragrance appears to be recessive in crosses, but there are a few species or hybrids, Z. drummondii (white), Z. morrisclintae (pink) and Z. jonesii (light yellow), that all carry the trait. At least two of these open their flowers at night and are attractive to nocturnal insects. The flowers typically last only for a day or two; but new flowers may appear in a succession of blooms, especially during humid or rainy weather.

Various members of the genus may bloom spring only or repeat and continue into autumn, often a few days after rainstorms (thus one of the common names, rain lilies). Periods of synchronous bloom, which breeders have dubbed "blitzes", are part of their ornamental value, but also times breeders exploit for the purpose of producing new hybrids.

Most species under cultivation will bloom without the naturally imposed drought and wet that occurs in nature. Greenhouse grown plants bloom very freely but cycle through periods of bloom. One of the longest blooming of all the species is Z. primulina which blooms from April until October. Although it is apomictic, it is a choice parent for crosses because of its rapid repeat flowering trait and long bloom season. Some other species such as Z. morrisclintae appear to bloom only in the spring season. Most of these species are easily propagated vegetatively via offsets or twin scaling. A few of them such as Z. clintae are slow to produce increase.

Unusual phenotypes can be preserved vegetatively. Sexual reproduction is via seed. The apomictic species freely set seed and faithfully reproduce the maternal phenotype.

== Taxonomy ==
The genus Zephyranthes was first described by William Herbert in 1821. The type is Zephyranthes atamasca, a conserved type under the International Code of Nomenclature for algae, fungi, and plants. Zephyranthes is placed in the subfamily Amaryllidoideae, which some specialists prefer to treat as the family Amaryllidaceae sensu stricto. The division of the genera of the subfamily into tribes has varied, but from the 1980s onwards, Zephyranthes has usually been placed in the tribe Hippeastreae. Molecular phylogenetic studies from 2000 onwards showed that although Hippeastreae was monophyletic, many of the genera placed in the tribe were not; in particular, Habranthus, Zephyranthes and Sprekelia formed a complex in which traditionally placed species were intermingled. Accordingly, in 2019, a broad circumscription of Zephyranthes was proposed, including the former genera Habranthus and Sprekelia as well as some smaller genera. This proposal has been accepted by Plants of the World Online, among other taxonomic databases.

Under this system of classification, Zephyranthes Herb., together with Hippeastrum, is one of two genera in Hippeastrae, subtribe Hippeastrinae, and is treated as consisting of 5 subgenera (number of species):

- Zephyranthes subg. Eithea (Ravenna) Nic.García (2)
- Zephyranthes subg. Zephyranthes (~150)
- Zephyranthes subg. Habranthus (Herb.) Nic.García (3)
- Zephyranthes subg. Neorhodophiala Nic.García & Meerow (1)
- Zephyranthes subg. Myostemma (Salisb.) Nic.García (17)

=== Species ===
There are about 200 species, nearly all of which are in subgenus Zephyranthes.

== Distribution and habitat ==
It is native to tropical and subtropical America. It has been introduced to Africa, Asia, and Australia. These perennial bulbs (geophytes) tolerate many ecological niches (periodically wet soil to desert conditions).

== Cultivation ==
These plants are commonly cultivated in US Department of Agriculture hardiness zones 7–10. Rain lily breeders may develop cultivars with greater cold hardness.

Generally rain lilies are sold in nurseries already potted up. This is of benefit since the growth cycle is not interrupted. Rarely (and not ideally), dried bulbs are marketed. Such dried bulbs usually become established after one to two growing seasons and will regain bloom vigor.

Although many of the common names include "lily", these plants are actually in the Amaryllis family. Elizabeth Lawrence, in her classic A Southern Garden (1942), writes with enthusiasm about pink rain lily, Z. grandiflora (=Z. carinata):

It is one of the hardiest species and is said to winter safely in Philadelphia. As a child I thought of the little rose-colored lilies as the sign and seal of summer. My grandmother in Georgia grew them in her garden, and my grandmother in West Virginia grew them in little pots on the front porch.

...

Those in my garden [in Raleigh] came from Georgia. They have been with me so long and have increased so much that their bloom makes a sea of pink. The season is in June but there is scattered bloom in the late summer and even to the end of September. The flowers are large, to over three inches [75 mm] long, on ten-inch [250 mm] stems. They open out flat at midday and close in the afternoon; this is a characteristic of the genus. The shimmering leaves are grass green.

=== Breeding ===
Breeding with these species has some inherent difficulties summarized by Roy Chowdhury (2006) as ranging from pseudogamy and apomixis, differences in chromosome number and varying times of flowering. In spite of these drawbacks breeding work is being done to enhance the value of the plants as ornamentals. Because of the nature of botanical restriction, breeding programs often encounter impediments. Reciprocal crosses may be difficult because the apomictic parent cannot be used as female parents. However interspecific crosses are well documented. There are tri-hybrids and quad-hybrids being produced (crossing 3 or 4 distinct species). Such work indicates that complex hybrids should be possible. One constraint remains that seedlings may still carry the apomictic trait, and it is necessary to have progeny from a test cross to determine this.

== Toxicity ==
Many parts of the plant including the leaves and bulbs are considered to be toxic. The genus has been evaluated for possible medicinal properties, and the biochemically toxic compounds are classed as alkaloids.

== Uses ==
Parts of Zephyranthes, such as bulbs and leaves, are used in traditional medicine. In Peru, Z. andina (syn. Z. parvula) was used for tumors. In China, Z. rosea was used for breast cancer and in Africa the leaves of Z. candida were used for diabetes mellitus. It was used for simple problems from head ache, cough, cold, and boils to very complicated diseases such as breast cancer, tuberculosis, rheumatism, tumors.

== See also ==
- List of plants known as lily
