= Haemanthamine =

Names
- IUPAC name 3β-Methoxy-1,2-didehydro-5α,13α,19α-crinan-11β-ol
- Systematic IUPAC name (3S,4aS,5S,11bS,12R)-3-Methoxy-4,4a-dihydro-3H,6H,9H-5,11b-ethano[1,3]dioxolo[4,5-j]phenanthridin-12-ol
- Other names Hemanthamine

Identifiers
CAS Number	466-75-1
3D model (JSmol)	Interactive image
ChEBI	CHEBI:5600
ChEMBL	ChEMBL401114
ChemSpider	390261
EC Number	884-578-7
KEGG	C08527
PubChem CID	441593
UNII	VBL6HZX2ZB
CompTox Dashboard (EPA)	DTXSID30963614
- InChI: InChI=1S/C17H19NO4/c1-20-11-2-3-17-12-6-14-13(21-9-22-14)4-10(12)7-18(8-16(17)19)15(17)5-11/h2-4,6,11,15-16,19H,5,7-9H2,1H3/t11-,15+,16+,17+/m1/s1 Key: YGPRSGKVLATIHT-HSHDSVGOSA-N
- SMILES: CO[C@H]1C[C@H]2[C@@]3(C=C1)[C@H](CN2CC4=CC5=C(C=C34)OCO5)O

Properties
Chemical formula	C_{17}H_{19}NO_{4}
Molar mass	301.342 g·mol^{−1}
- Except where otherwise noted, data are given for materials in their standard state (at 25 °C [77 °F], 100 kPa). Infobox references

Haemanthamine is a crinine-like alkaloid from the Amaryllidaceae plant family.
