= List of Zephyranthes species =

List of plant species in the genus Zephyranthes.

== List ==
As of January 2026, Plants of the World Online accepts the following 192 species:

- Zephyranthes advena (Ker Gawl.) Nic.García
- Zephyranthes alba Flagg, G.Lom.Sm. & García-Mend.
- Zephyranthes albiella Traub
- Zephyranthes albolilacina Cárdenas
- Zephyranthes amambaica (Ravenna) Nic.García & Meerow
- Zephyranthes americana (Hoffmanns.) Ravenna
- Zephyranthes amoena Ravenna
- Zephyranthes ananuca (Phil.) Nic.García
- Zephyranthes andalgalensis (Ravenna) S.C.Arroyo
- Zephyranthes andina (R.E.Fr.) Traub
- Zephyranthes araguaiensis (Ravenna) R.S.Oliveira & Dutilh
- Zephyranthes araucana (Phil.) Nic.García
- Zephyranthes arenicola Brandegee
- Zephyranthes atamasco (L.) Herb.
- Zephyranthes aurata (Ravenna) Nic.García & Meerow
- Zephyranthes bagnoldii (Herb.) Nic.García
- Zephyranthes bahiensis (Ravenna) R.S.Oliveira & Dutilh
- Zephyranthes bakeri (Phil.) ined.
- Zephyranthes barrosiana (Hunz. & Di Fulvio) S.C.Arroyo
- Zephyranthes bella T.M.Howard & S.Ogden
- Zephyranthes berteroana (Phil.) Nic.García
- Zephyranthes bifida (Herb.) Nic.García & Meerow
- Zephyranthes bifolia (Aubl.) M.Roem.
- Zephyranthes blumenavia (K.Koch & C.D.Bouché ex Carrière) Nic.García & Dutilh
- Zephyranthes botumirimensis (R.S.Oliveira) R.S.Oliveira & Dutilh
- Zephyranthes brachyandra (Baker) Backer
- Zephyranthes brevipes Standl.
- Zephyranthes breviscapa Ravenna
- Zephyranthes briquetii J.F.Macbr.
- Zephyranthes caaguazuensis (Ravenna) Nic.García & Meerow
- Zephyranthes caerulea (Griseb.) Baker
- Zephyranthes calderensis (Ravenna) Nic.García & S.C.Arroyo
- Zephyranthes candida Herb.
- Zephyranthes capivarina Ravenna
- Zephyranthes cardinalis C.H.Wright
- Zephyranthes carinata Herb.
- Zephyranthes carminea (Ravenna) S.C.Arroyo
- Zephyranthes cearensis (Herb.) Baker
- Zephyranthes chacoensis (Ravenna) S.C.Arroyo
- Zephyranthes chichimeca T.M.Howard & S.Ogden
- Zephyranthes chlorosolen (Herb.) D.Dietr.
- Zephyranthes chrysantha Greenm. & C.H.Thomps.
- Zephyranthes ciceroana M.M.Mejía & R.G.García
- Zephyranthes cisandina (Ravenna) Nic.García
- Zephyranthes citrina Baker
- Zephyranthes clintiae Traub
- Zephyranthes colonum (Phil.) ined.
- Zephyranthes comunelloi R.E.Bastian & Büneker
- Zephyranthes concinna (Ravenna) R.S.Oliveira & Dutilh
- Zephyranthes concolor (Lindl.) G.Nicholson
- Zephyranthes consobrina (Phil.) ined.
- Zephyranthes contermina (Ravenna) R.S.Oliveira & Dutilh
- Zephyranthes conzattii Greenm.
- Zephyranthes correntina (Roitman, J.A.Castillo & M.R.Barrios) Nic.García & S.C.Arroyo
- Zephyranthes crassibulba (Ravenna) S.C.Arroyo
- Zephyranthes crociflora T.M.Howard & S.Ogden
- Zephyranthes cubensis Urb.
- Zephyranthes datensis (Ravenna) R.S.Oliveira & Dutilh
- Zephyranthes depauperata Herb.
- Zephyranthes dichromantha T.M.Howard
- Zephyranthes diluta Ravenna
- Zephyranthes drummondii D.Don
- Zephyranthes duarteana (Ravenna) R.S.Oliveira & Dutilh
- Zephyranthes elegans Ravenna
- Zephyranthes elwesii (C.H.Wright) Nic.García
- Zephyranthes erubescens S.Watson
- Zephyranthes estensis (Ravenna) Nic.García & S.C.Arroyo
- Zephyranthes filifolia Herb. ex Kraenzl.
- Zephyranthes flavissima Ravenna
- Zephyranthes fluvialis Ravenna
- Zephyranthes formosissima (L.) Z.H.Feng
- Zephyranthes fosteri Traub
- Zephyranthes gameleirensis (Ravenna) R.S.Oliveira & Dutilh
- Zephyranthes gilliesiana (Herb.) Nic.García
- Zephyranthes goiana (Ravenna) R.S.Oliveira & Dutilh
- Zephyranthes graciliflora (Herb.) Nic.García
- Zephyranthes gracilifolia (Herb.) G.Nicholson
- Zephyranthes gracilis Herb.
- Zephyranthes gratissima Ravenna
- Zephyranthes guachipensis (Ravenna) S.C.Arroyo
- Zephyranthes guatemalensis L.B.Spencer
- Zephyranthes hondurensis Ravenna
- Zephyranthes howardii Traub
- Zephyranthes immaculata (Traub & Clint) Nic.García & Meerow
- Zephyranthes insularum H.H.Hume ex Moldenke
- Zephyranthes irwiniana (Ravenna) Nic.García
- Zephyranthes ischihualasta (Ravenna) S.C.Arroyo
- Zephyranthes ita-andivi García-Mend., Flagg & G.Lom.Sm.
- Zephyranthes itaobina (Ravenna) Nic.García
- Zephyranthes jamesonii (Baker) Nic.García & S.C.Arroyo
- Zephyranthes jonesii (Cory) Traub
- Zephyranthes jujuyensis E.Holmb.
- Zephyranthes katheriniae L.B.Spencer
- Zephyranthes lactea S.Moore
- Zephyranthes laeta (Phil.) Nic.García
- Zephyranthes lagesiana Ravenna
- Zephyranthes lagopaivae (Campos-Rocha & Dutilh) Nic.García & Dutilh
- Zephyranthes latissimifolia L.B.Spencer
- Zephyranthes leonensis (Ravenna) S.C.Arroyo
- Zephyranthes leptandra (Ravenna) Nic.García
- Zephyranthes leucantha T.M.Howard
- Zephyranthes lindleyana Herb.
- Zephyranthes lineata (Phil.) ined.
- Zephyranthes longifolia Hemsl.
- Zephyranthes longipes Baker
- Zephyranthes longistyla Pax
- Zephyranthes longituba Flory ex Flagg & G.Lom.Sm.
- Zephyranthes lucida (R.S.Oliveira) R.S.Oliveira & Dutilh
- Zephyranthes macrosiphon Baker
- Zephyranthes maculata (L'Hér.) Nic.García
- Zephyranthes magnoi (Ravenna) S.C.Arroyo
- Zephyranthes martinezii (Ravenna) Nic.García
- Zephyranthes mataca (Ravenna) S.C.Arroyo
- Zephyranthes matogrossensis (Ravenna) R.S.Oliveira & Dutilh
- Zephyranthes medinae (L.O.Alvarado & García-Mend.) Nic.García & Meerow
- Zephyranthes mendocensis Baker
- Zephyranthes mesochloa Herb.
- Zephyranthes mexicana (T.M.Howard) Nic.García & Meerow
- Zephyranthes microcarpa (Rusby) S.C.Arroyo
- Zephyranthes microstigma Ravenna
- Zephyranthes millarensis (Ravenna) Nic.García
- Zephyranthes minima Herb.
- Zephyranthes minor (Ravenna) R.S.Oliveira & Dutilh
- Zephyranthes minuta (Kunth) D.Dietr.
- Zephyranthes miradorensis (Kraenzl.) Espejo & López-Ferr.
- Zephyranthes moctezumae T.M.Howard
- Zephyranthes modesta Ravenna
- Zephyranthes moelleri (Phil.) Nic.García
- Zephyranthes monantha (Ravenna) Nic.García
- Zephyranthes montana (Phil.) Nic.García
- Zephyranthes morrisclintii Traub & T.M.Howard
- Zephyranthes nelsonii Greenm.
- Zephyranthes nervosa Herb.
- Zephyranthes neumannii (Roitman, J.A.Castillo & Maza) Nic.García & S.C.Arroyo
- Zephyranthes nymphaea T.M.Howard & S.Ogden
- Zephyranthes oranensis (Ravenna) S.C.Arroyo
- Zephyranthes orellanae Carnevali, Duno & J.L.Tapia
- Zephyranthes pantanalensis (Ravenna) R.S.Oliveira & Dutilh
- Zephyranthes paranaensis Ravenna
- Zephyranthes pedunculosa (Herb.) Nic.García & S.C.Arroyo
- Zephyranthes philadelphica (Ravenna) Nic.García & Meerow
- Zephyranthes phycelloides (Herb.) Nic.García
- Zephyranthes picta (Ravenna) S.C.Arroyo
- Zephyranthes plumieri H.H.Hume ex Moldenke
- Zephyranthes popetana (Phil.) ined.
- Zephyranthes primulina T.M.Howard & S.Ogden
- Zephyranthes proctorii Acev.-Rodr. & M.T.Strong
- Zephyranthes pseudoconcolor Flagg, G.Lom.Sm. & García-Mend.
- Zephyranthes puertoricensis Traub
- Zephyranthes pulchella J.G.Sm.
- Zephyranthes purpurea Phil.
- Zephyranthes purpurella Ravenna
- Zephyranthes refugiensis F.B.Jones
- Zephyranthes reginae T.M.Howard & S.Ogden
- Zephyranthes riojana (Ravenna) S.C.Arroyo
- Zephyranthes robusta (Herb.) Baker
- Zephyranthes rosalensis Ravenna
- Zephyranthes rosea Lindl.
- Zephyranthes rubra (Ravenna) R.S.Oliveira & Dutilh
- Zephyranthes ruizlealii (Ravenna) S.C.Arroyo
- Zephyranthes saipinensis (Ravenna) Nic.García
- Zephyranthes salinarum (Ravenna) S.C.Arroyo
- Zephyranthes saltensis (Ravenna) S.C.Arroyo
- Zephyranthes sanavirone (Roitman, J.A.Castillo, G.M.Tourn & Uria) Nic.García & S.C.Arroyo
- Zephyranthes sarae J.M.Watson & A.R.Flores
- Zephyranthes schulziana (Ravenna) S.C.Arroyo
- Zephyranthes sessilis Herb.
- Zephyranthes simpsonii Chapm.
- Zephyranthes smallii (Alexander) Traub
- Zephyranthes solisii (Phil.) ined.
- Zephyranthes spectabilis (Ravenna) S.C.Arroyo
- Zephyranthes splendens (Renjifo) Nic.García
- Zephyranthes sprekeliopsis (Christenh. & Byng) Nic.García & Meerow
- Zephyranthes stellaris Ravenna
- Zephyranthes stellatorosea G.Lom.Sm., Spurrier, Flagg & Espejo
- Zephyranthes steyermarkii (Ravenna) S.C.Arroyo
- Zephyranthes subflava L.B.Spencer
- Zephyranthes susatana Fern.Alonso & Groenend.
- Zephyranthes sylvatica (Mart. ex Schult. & Schult.f.) Baker
- Zephyranthes tenuiflora (Phil.) Nic.García
- Zephyranthes tepicensis (Greenm. ex Flagg & G.Lom.Sm.) Flagg & G.Lom.Sm.
- Zephyranthes traubii (W.Hayw.) Moldenke
- Zephyranthes treatiae S.Watson
- Zephyranthes tubispatha (L'Hér.) Herb.
- Zephyranthes tucumanensis Hunz.
- Zephyranthes uruguaianica Ravenna
- Zephyranthes venturiana (Ravenna) S.C.Arroyo
- Zephyranthes versicolor (Herb.) G.Nicholson
- Zephyranthes vittata (T.M.Howard) Nic.García & Meerow
- Zephyranthes × woelfleana (Traub) Z.H.Feng
- Zephyranthes wrightii Baker
- Zephyranthes yaviensis Ravenna
- Zephyranthes zapotecana Nic.García & Meerow

Some other names are found in the horticultural literature, but as of September 2011 not in scientific databases of plant names, such as the Kew Checklist or the International Plant Names Index. These include: Zephyranthes huastecana, Zephyranthes lancasterae, Zephyranthes sylvestris and Zephyranthes zeyheri. Zephyranthes sulphurea is Z. citrina.
