= Golden Aster Scrub Nature Preserve =

Natural area in Florida

Coordinates: 27°49′N 82°22′W

Golden Aster Scrub Nature Preserve is in Gibsonton, Florida in Hillsborough County, Florida. The 1,181-acre (478-hectare) nature preserve includes a ridge of scrub habitats surrounded by pine flatwoods, pockets of wet prairie, hardwood swamp, and freshwater marsh. Animal life includes the gopher tortoise, Eastern indigo snake, Southeastern American kestrel, sandhill crane, Florida golden aster and Florida Scrub Jay. There is a 3-mile (4.8 km) loop hiking trail.

The preserve is in the Bullfrog Creek watershed in southern Hillsborough County. A management plan for it is updated every 10 years. Plant species include yellow butterwort, red margin zephyr lily (Zephyranthes simpsonii), and Treat's zephyr lily (Zephyranthes treatiae). The preserve includes the headwaters of Kitchen Branch Stream. In 2023, amenities included a composting toilet and picnic pavilion.

It is believed to be home to some of the only Florida scrub jays in Hillsborough County. The lightly used trail has limited shade and some water views.
