= Hippeastrum aviflorum =

Scientific classification
- Kingdom: Plantae
- Clade: Tracheophytes
- Clade: Angiosperms
- Clade: Monocots
- Order: Asparagales
- Family: Amaryllidaceae
- Subfamily: Amaryllidoideae
- Genus: Hippeastrum
- Species: H. aviflorum

Binomial name
- Hippeastrum aviflorum (Ravenna) Dutilh

Synonyms
- Amaryllis aviflora Ravenna

Species of flowering plant

Hippeastrum aviflorum is a flowering perennial herbaceous bulbous plant, in the family Amaryllidaceae, found in Argentina.

== Taxonomy ==
Described by Dutilh in 1997.

== Sources ==
- The Plant List (2012). "Hippeastrum aviflorum".
- GBIF: Hippeastrum aviflorum
