= Gliese 367 b =

Exoplanet orbiting the star Gliese 367

Gliese 367 b / Tahay
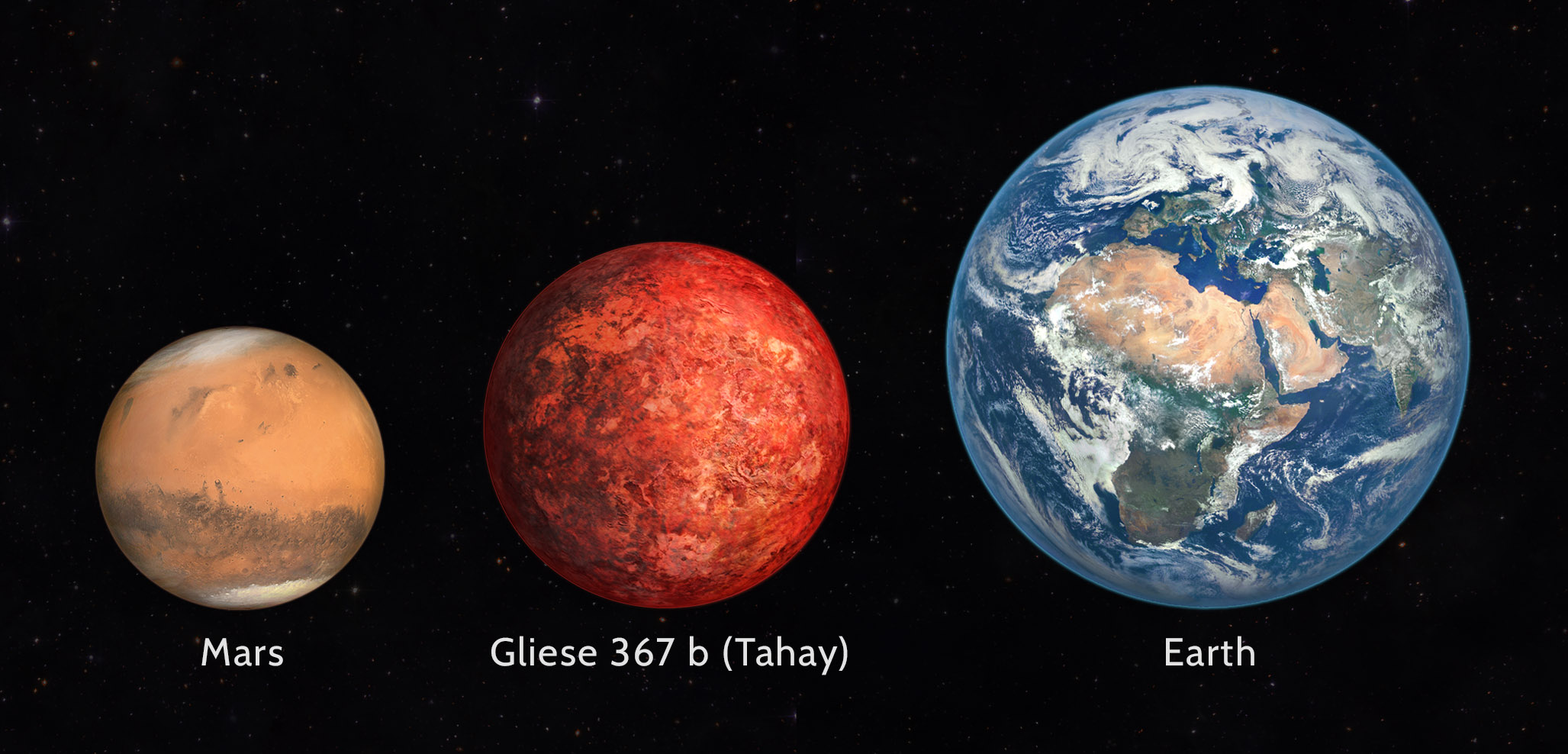
- Artist's impression and size comparison of Gliese 367 b with Earth and Mars

Discovery
- Discovered by: Kristine Lam, et al.
- Discovery site: TESS
- Discovery date: December 2021
- Detection method: Transit

Designations
- Alternative names: Tahay, TOI-731.01

Orbital characteristics
- Semi-major axis: 0.00709±0.00027 AU
- Eccentricity: 0.06+0.07 −0.04
- Orbital period (sidereal): 0.3219225±0.0000002 d
- Inclination: 79.89°+0.87° −0.85°
- Argument of periastron: 66°+41° −108°
- Semi-amplitude: 1.003±0.078 m/s
- Star: Gliese 367

Physical characteristics
- Mean radius: 0.699±0.024 R_{🜨}
- Mass: 0.633±0.050 M_{🜨}
- Mean density: 10.2±1.3 g/cm^{3}
- Temperature: 1,728±90 K (1,455 °C; 2,651 °F, dayside) <847 K (574 °C; 1,065 °F, nightside)

Gliese 367 b, formally named Tahay, is a sub-Earth exoplanet orbiting the red dwarf star Gliese 367 (GJ 367), 30.7 light-years (9.4 parsecs) from Earth in the constellation of Vela. The exoplanet takes just 7.7 hours to orbit its star, one of the shortest orbits of any planet.

As of 2025, Gliese 367 b is the smallest-known exoplanet within 10 parsecs of the Solar System that has a measured radius, though Proxima Centauri d and the planets of Barnard's Star are less massive and could be smaller.

== Nomenclature ==
In August 2022, this planet and its host star were included among 20 systems to be named by the third NameExoWorlds project. The approved names, proposed by a team from Chile, were announced in June 2023. Gliese 367 b is named Tahay and its host star is named Añañuca, after names for the endemic Chilean wildflowers Calydorea xiphioides and Phycella cyrtanthoides. Calydorea xiphioides only blooms for between 7 and 8 hours each year, alluding to the planet's short orbital period of 7.7 hours.

== Properties ==
Due to its close orbit, the exoplanet gets bombarded with radiation over 500 times more than Earth receives from the Sun. Dayside temperatures on GJ 367b are around 1,728 K (1,455 °C; 2,651 °F).

Gliese 367 b is presumably tidally locked, and any atmosphere, if ever existed, would have boiled away due to the planet's extreme temperatures. Observations from the James Webb Space Telescope provide evidence that the planet indeed lacks an atmosphere, and that its albedo is low. The absence of day–night heat recirculation suggests significant volatile loss, shaping its current atmospheric and surface properties. GJ 367b's exceptional density raises intriguing hypotheses about its origin, from mantle evaporation to Mercury-like collisions. This discovery prompts broader inquiries into the habitability of small rocky planets orbiting M dwarfs and offers valuable insights into planetary formation and atmospheric dynamics across the cosmos.

The core of GJ 367b is likely composed of iron and nickel, making it similar to Mercury's core. The core of GJ 367b is extremely dense, making up about 91% of the planet's mass; the entire planet has a total density of 10.2±1.3 g/cm^{3}, about twice that of Earth. The planet may have been stripped of the outer silicate layers, like Mercury and other iron planets, due to collisions or evaporation by the extreme stellar radiation.
