= Z. elegans =

Z. elegans may refer to:

- Zephyranthes elegans, a flowering plant native to Bolivia
- Zinnia elegans, the common zinnia or youth-and-old-age, a flowering plant
- Zodarion elegans, a spider found in Southern Europe and Northern Africa

== Synonyms ==
- Zigadenus elegans, a synonym for Anticlea elegans, the mountain deathcamas, elegant camas or alkali grass, a plant found in North America
