= Zephyranthes subg. Eithea =

- Zephyranthes blumenavia

Scientific classification
- Kingdom: Plantae
- Clade: Tracheophytes
- Clade: Angiosperms
- Clade: Monocots
- Order: Asparagales
- Family: Amaryllidaceae
- Subfamily: Amaryllidoideae
- Genus: Zephyranthes
- Subgenus: Zephyranthes subg. Eithea (Ravenna) Nic.García

Type species
- Zephyranthes blumenavia (K.Koch & C.D.Bouché ex Carrière) Nic.García & Dutilh

Species
- See here
- It is endemic to Brazil

Subgenus of flowering plants

Zephyranthes subg. Eithea is a subgenus of the genus Zephyranthes endemic to Brazil.

== Description ==
Zephyranthes blumenavia inflorescence

=== Vegetative characteristics ===
Zephyranthes subg. Eithea are 12–50 cm tall, bulbous plants with ovoid bulbs and 1–8 pseudopetiolate leaves.

=== Generative characteristics ===
The 1–6 pedicellate, zygomorphic, campanulate to infundibuliform flowers are produced on pseudo-umbellate inflorescences with 8–30 cm long, and 2–6 mm wide scapes.

== Cytology ==
The chromosome count is 2n = 18.

== Taxonomy ==
It was first published as Eithea Ravenna by Pedro Felix Ravenna in 2002 with Eithea blumenavia (Carrière) Ravenna as the type species. It was included into the genus Zephyranthes Herb. as Zephyranthes subg. Eithea (Ravenna) Nic.García published by Nicolás García Berguecio in 2019.

=== Species ===
It has two species:

- Zephyranthes blumenavia (K.Koch & C.D.Bouché ex Carrière) Nic.García & Dutilh
- Zephyranthes lagopaivae (Campos-Rocha & Dutilh) Nic.García & Dutilh

== Conservation ==
Zephyranthes blumenavia is Endangered (EN), and Zephyranthes lagopaivae is Critically Endangered (CR).
