= Zephyranthes insularum =

Rainlily

Scientific classification
- Kingdom: Plantae
- Clade: Tracheophytes
- Clade: Angiosperms
- Clade: Monocots
- Order: Asparagales
- Family: Amaryllidaceae
- Subfamily: Amaryllidoideae
- Genus: Zephyranthes
- Species: Z. insularum

Binomial name
- Zephyranthes insularum H.H.Hume ex Moldenke

Species of plant

Zephyranthes insularum, common name rainlily, is a bulbous flowering plant in the family Amaryllidaceae, subfamily Amaryllidoideae, native to Cuba and reportedly naturalized in Florida and in parts of Mexico.

Zephyranthes insularum is a small bulb-forming perennial no more than 30 cm tall. Flowers are trumpet-shaped, white to very pale pink.

== Taxonomy ==
Zephyranthes insularum H.H.Hume ex Moldenke (i.e. the species named by Hume) is accepted by the World Checklist of Selected Plant Families as a distinct species. Zephyranthes insularum auct. non Hume (i.e. a name applied by some authors other than in the sense intended by Hume) is a synonym of Zephyranthes puertoricensis.
