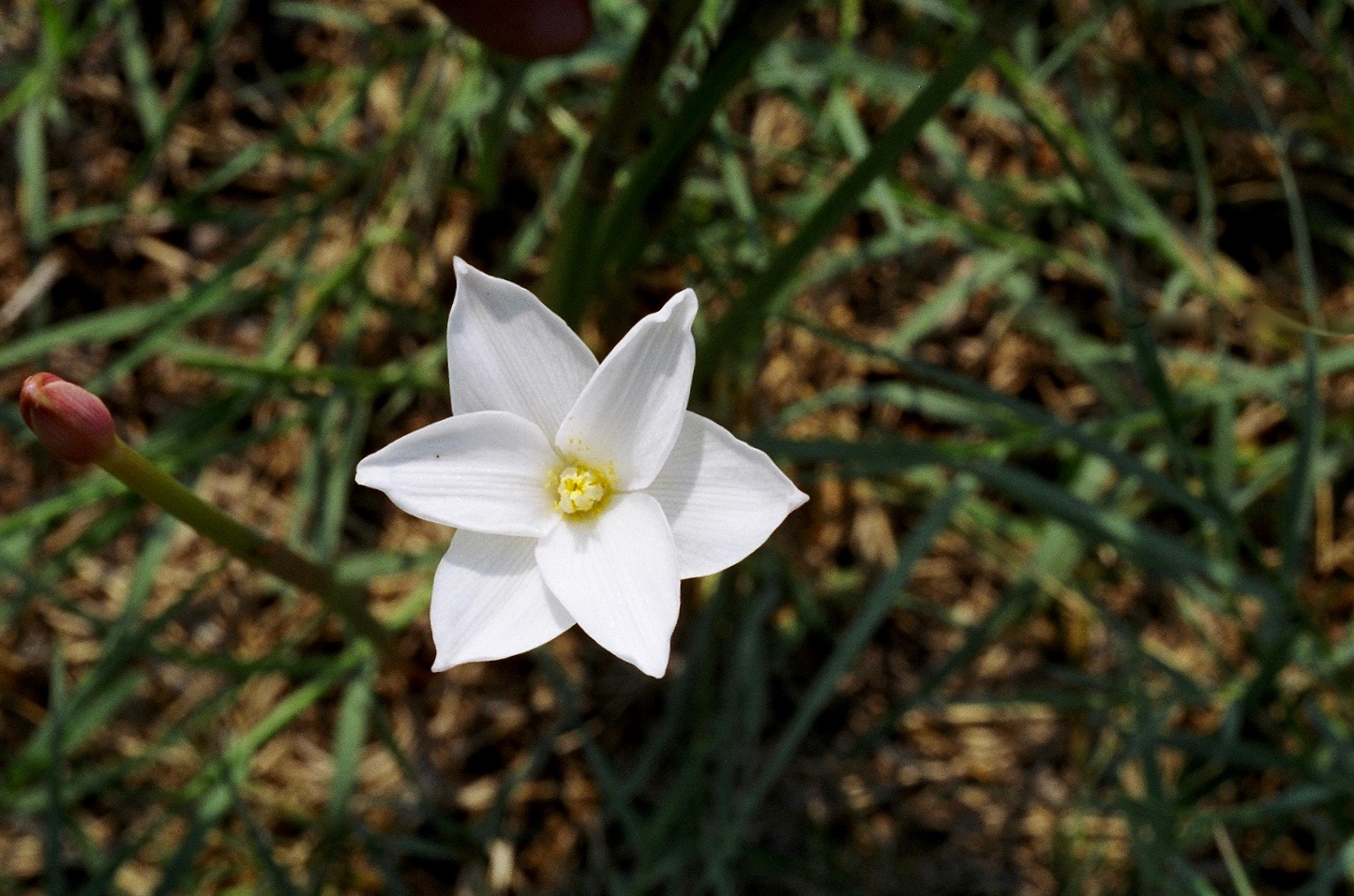
- Flower
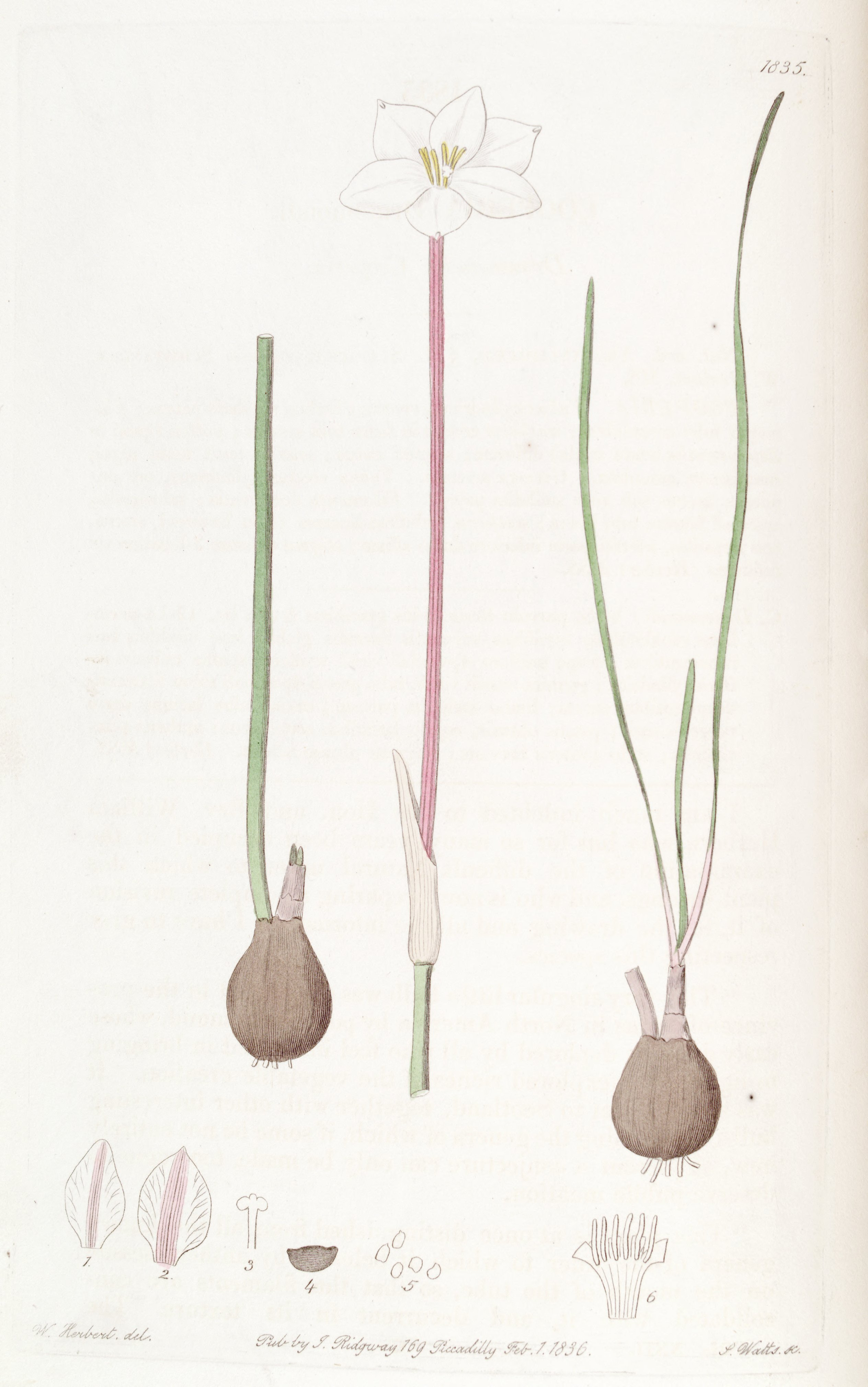
- 1836 botanical illustration

Scientific classification
- Kingdom: Plantae
- Clade: Tracheophytes
- Clade: Angiosperms
- Clade: Monocots
- Order: Asparagales
- Family: Amaryllidaceae
- Subfamily: Amaryllidoideae
- Genus: Zephyranthes
- Species: Z. chlorosolen

Binomial name
- Zephyranthes chlorosolen (Herb.) D.Dietr.

Synonyms
- List: Amaryllis drummondii (Herb.) Steud.; Cooperia brasiliensis Traub; Cooperia chlorosolen Herb.; Cooperia drummondiana Herb.; Cooperia drummondiana var. chlorosolen (Herb.) Herb.; Cooperia drummondii Herb.; Cooperia drummondii var. chlorosolen (Herb.) Steud.; Cooperia kansensis W.C.Stevens; Cooperia mexicana Herb.; Hippeastrum chlorosolen (Herb.) Christenh. & Byng; Leucothauma chlorosolen (Herb.) Ravenna; Zephyranthes brasiliensis (Traub) Traub; Zephyranthes brazosensis Traub; Zephyranthes brazosensis var. chlorosolen (Herb.) Traub; Zephyranthes herbertiana D.Dietr.; Zephyranthes kansensis (W.C.Stevens) Traub

= Zephyranthes chlorosolen =

Species of plant

Zephyranthes chlorosolen, known by a number of common names including Drummond's rain‑lily, evening rain‑lily, evening star rain lily (names it shares with Zephyranthes drummondii), Brazos rain‑lily, Texas rainlily, and cebolleta, is a species of flowering plant in the family Amaryllidaceae. It is found from Kansas to Mexico, and has been introduced to southern Brazil. A geophytic perennial typically 18 to 35 cm (7 to 14 in) tall, its lone flower opens in the evening and lasts only a few days.

== Description ==
It is a geophytic perennial herb that typically grows between 18 and 35 cm (7.1 and 13.8 in) tall. The leaf blades are dull green, and are up to 5 mm wide. The spathe is 3 to 5.7 cm (1.2 to 2.2 in). The flowers are erect; the salverform perianth is 7.3 to 16 cm (2.9 to 6.3 in) long, and is white, sometimes tinged or veined with pink. The perianth tube is 7 to 13 cm (2.8 to 5.1 in), and is primarily white, sometimes with pale green proximally. The tepals are rarely reflexed. The stamens are fasciculate, and appear equal. The filaments are 0.2 to 0.5 mm, and are subulate. The anthers are 4 to 9 mm. The style is longer than the perianth tube. The stigma is capitate, and is among or very near the anthers. The pedicel is usually absent, but is rarely 0.1 cm.

== Distribution ==
It is found in the United States (Texas, Oklahoma, Mississippi, Louisiana, Kansas, Arkansas, Alabama, New Mexico), Mexico, and southern Brazil from elevations of 0 to 2400 meters from sea level.

== Photo Gallery ==
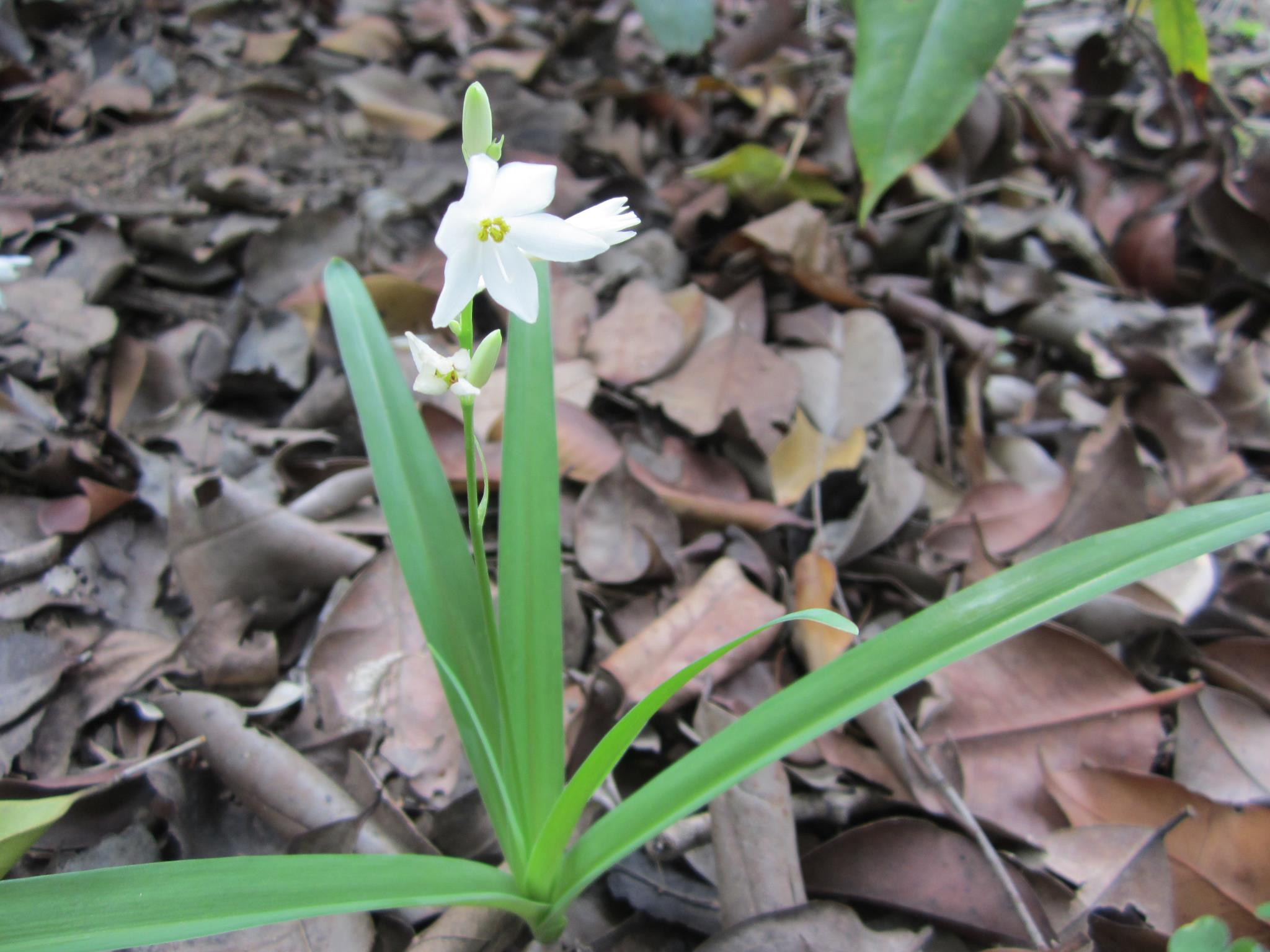
Habit

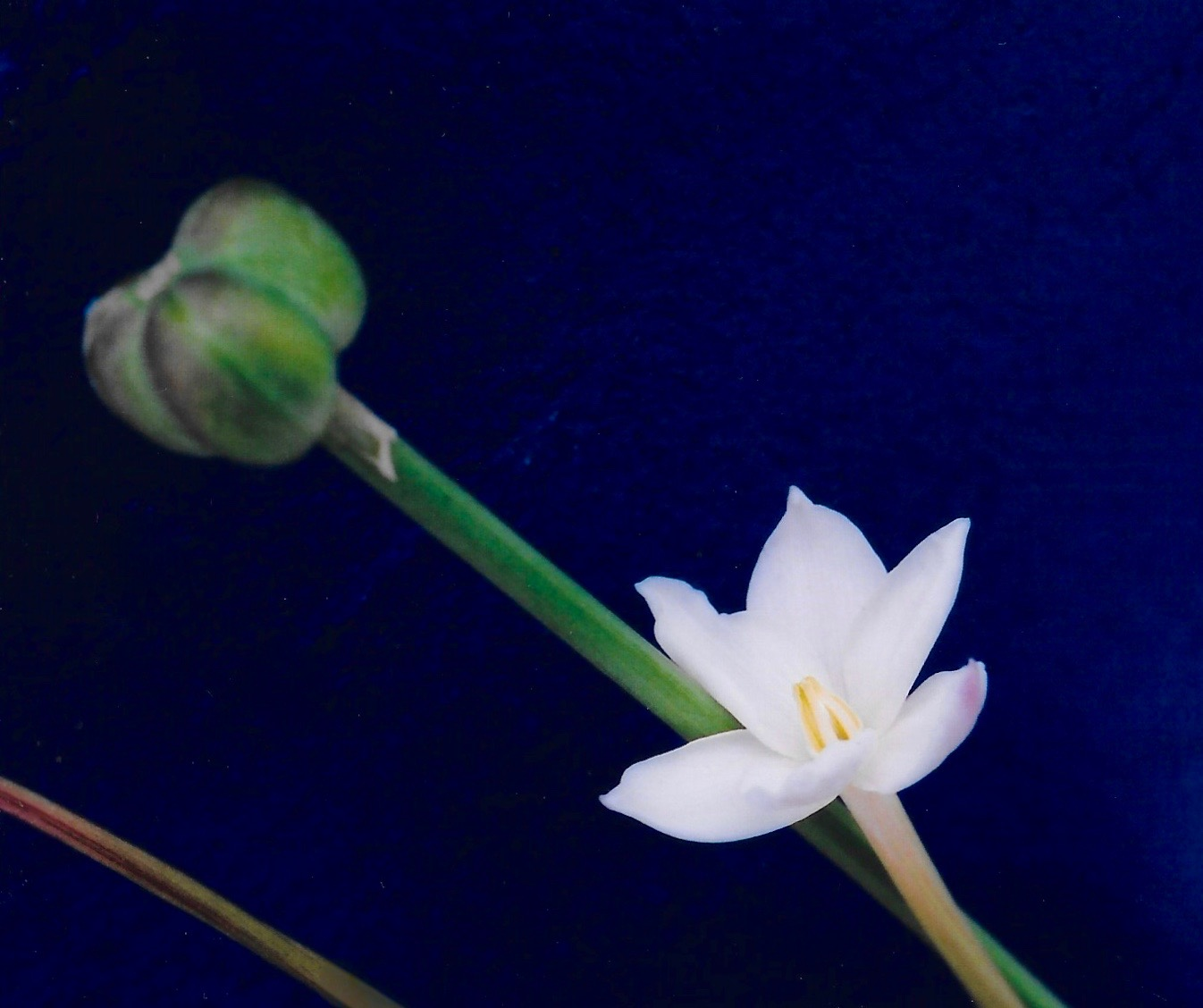
Flower bud and flower

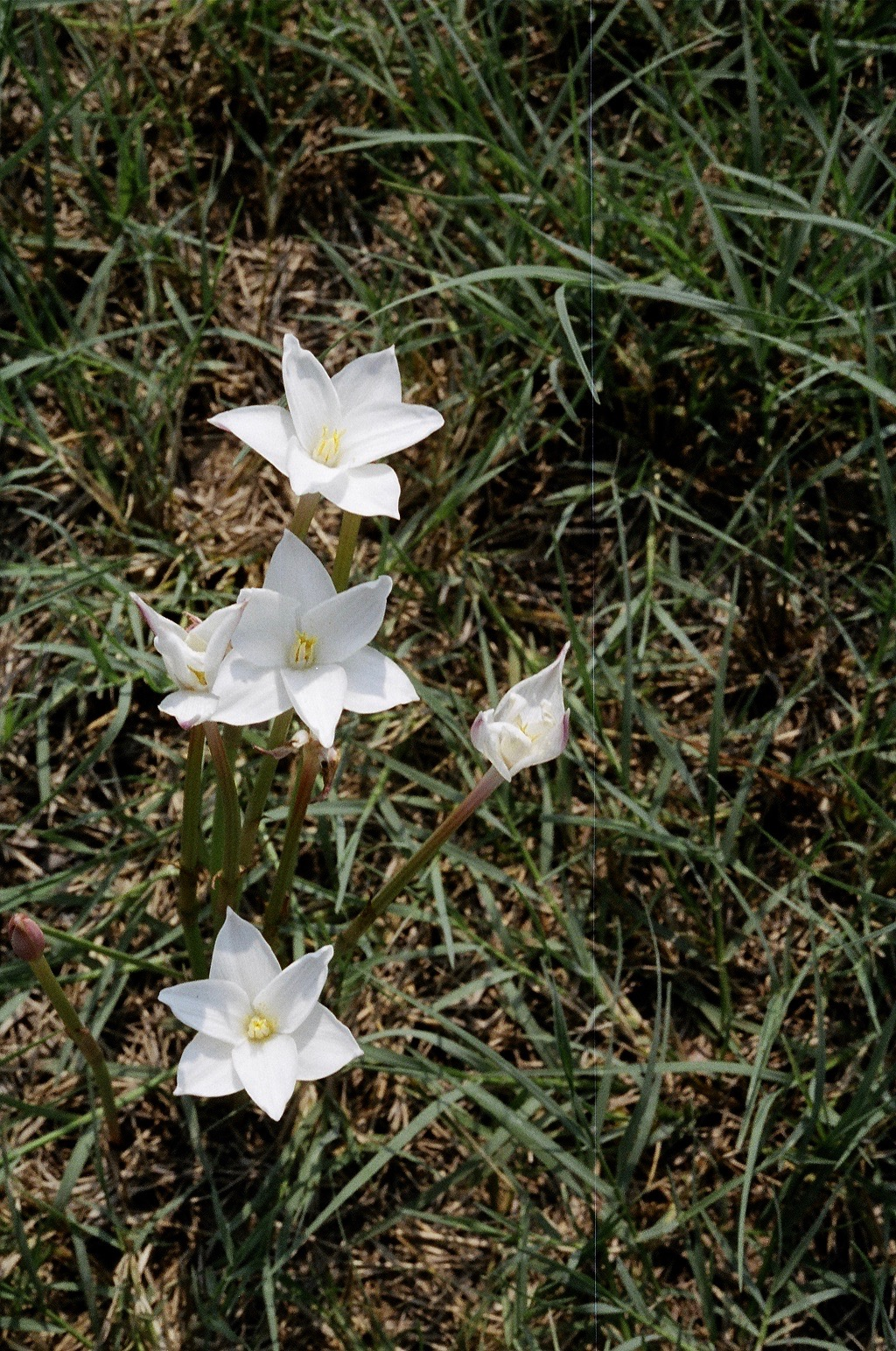
Multiple flowers typically represent offsets from the parent bulb
