= Gliese 367 =

Red dwarf star in the constellation Vela

Gliese 367 / Añañuca
Observation data Epoch J2000 Equinox J2000
- Constellation: Vela
- Right ascension: 09^{h} 44^{m} 29.83677^{s}
- Declination: −45° 46′ 35.4276″
- Apparent magnitude (V): 10.153±0.044

Characteristics
- Evolutionary stage: Main sequence
- Spectral type: M1.0V

Astrometry
Radial velocity (R_{v})	47.42±0.14 km/s
Proper motion (μ)	RA: −462.621(14) mas/yr Dec.: −582.668(15) mas/yr
Parallax (π)	106.1727±0.0141 mas
Distance	30.719 ± 0.004 ly (9.419 ± 0.001 pc)
Absolute magnitude (M_{V})	+10.25

Details
Mass	0.451±0.019 M_{☉}
Radius	0.457±0.015 R_{☉}
Luminosity	0.0288±0.0027 L_{☉}
Surface gravity (log g)	4.777±0.026 cgs
Temperature	3535±127 K
Metallicity [Fe/H]	−0.01±0.12 dex
Rotation	48±2 days
Rotational velocity (v sin i)	0.48±0.02 km/s
Age	7.95±1.31 Gyr

Other designations
- Añañuca, CD−45 5378, GJ 367, HIP 47780, TOI-731, TIC 34068865, TYC 8168-2031-1, 2MASS J09442986-4546351

Database references
SIMBAD	data
Exoplanet Archive	data
ARICNS	data

Gliese 367 (GJ 367, formally named Añañuca) is a red dwarf star in the constellation of Vela. It is relatively nearby, with a distance of 30.7 light-years (9.4 parsecs) from Earth as measured from its parallax. It hosts three known exoplanets, Gliese 367 b, c & d.

== Characteristics ==
A red dwarf star, Gliese 367 is smaller, cooler, and much fainter than the Sun. It has 0.457 times the Sun's radius, an effective temperature of 3522 K, and a luminosity just 2.88% that of the Sun.

Initial measurements from stellar isochrones suggested a young age of less than 60 million years old, but its orbit around the Milky Way is highly eccentric, unusual for a young star. It may have been forced into such an orbit via a gravitational encounter. However, a 2023 study, based on spectroscopic observations, found that its age should be much higher. Estimates from gyrochronology give an age in the range of 4.6 to 4.8 billion years. Rotation-age relations suggest a value of 7.95±1.31 billion years.

It is suspected to be a variable with amplitude 0.012 stellar magnitude and period 5.16 years. A stellar multiplicity survey in 2015 failed to detect any stellar companions to Gliese 367.

== Nomenclature ==
The designation Gliese 367 comes from the Gliese Catalogue of Nearby Stars. This was the 367th star listed in the first edition of the catalogue.

In August 2022, this planetary system was included among 20 systems to be named by the third NameExoWorlds project. The approved names, proposed by a team from Chile, were announced in June 2023. Gliese 367 is named Añañuca and its innermost planet is named Tahay, after names for the endemic Chilean wildflowers Phycella cyrtanthoides and Calydorea xiphioides.

== Planetary system ==
The star Gliese 367 was observed by TESS in February-March 2019, leading to its designation as an object of interest, and by January 2021 additional radial velocity data suggested the existence of a short-period planet, albeit with low certainty. The planet's existence was confirmed by both ground-based and satellite-based transit photometry data by December 2021.

Gliese 367 b is a close-orbiting sub-Earth that takes just 7.7 hours to orbit its star, one of the shortest orbits of any planet. Due to its close orbit, the exoplanet gets bombarded with radiation over 500 times what Earth receives from the Sun. Dayside temperatures on GJ 367b are around 1,500 °C (1,770 K; 2,730 °F). Due to its close orbit, it most likely is tidally locked. The atmosphere of Gliese 367 b, due to the extreme temperatures, would have boiled away along with signs of life. The core of GJ 367b is likely composed of iron and nickel, making its core similar to Mercury's core. The core of GJ 367b is extremely dense, making up most of the planet's mass.

A direct imaging study in 2022 failed to find any additional planets or stellar companions around Gliese 367. This rules out any companions at distances greater than 5 AU with masses greater than 20 M_{J} (for an age of 5 billion years). The discovery of two additional super-Earth-mass planets with periods of 11.5 and 34 days was published in 2023.

The Gliese 367 planetary system
Companion (in order from star)	Mass	Semimajor axis (AU)	Orbital period (days)	Eccentricity	Inclination (°)	Radius
b / Tahay	0.503±0.078 M_{🜨}	0.00709±0.00027	0.3219226(10)	0	78.6±0.7	0.736±0.025 R_{🜨}
c	≥4.13±0.36 M_{🜨}	—	11.5301±0.0078	0.09±0.07	—	—
d	≥6.03±0.49 M_{🜨}	—	34.369±0.073	0.14±0.09	—	—

== See also ==
- List of nearest exoplanets
