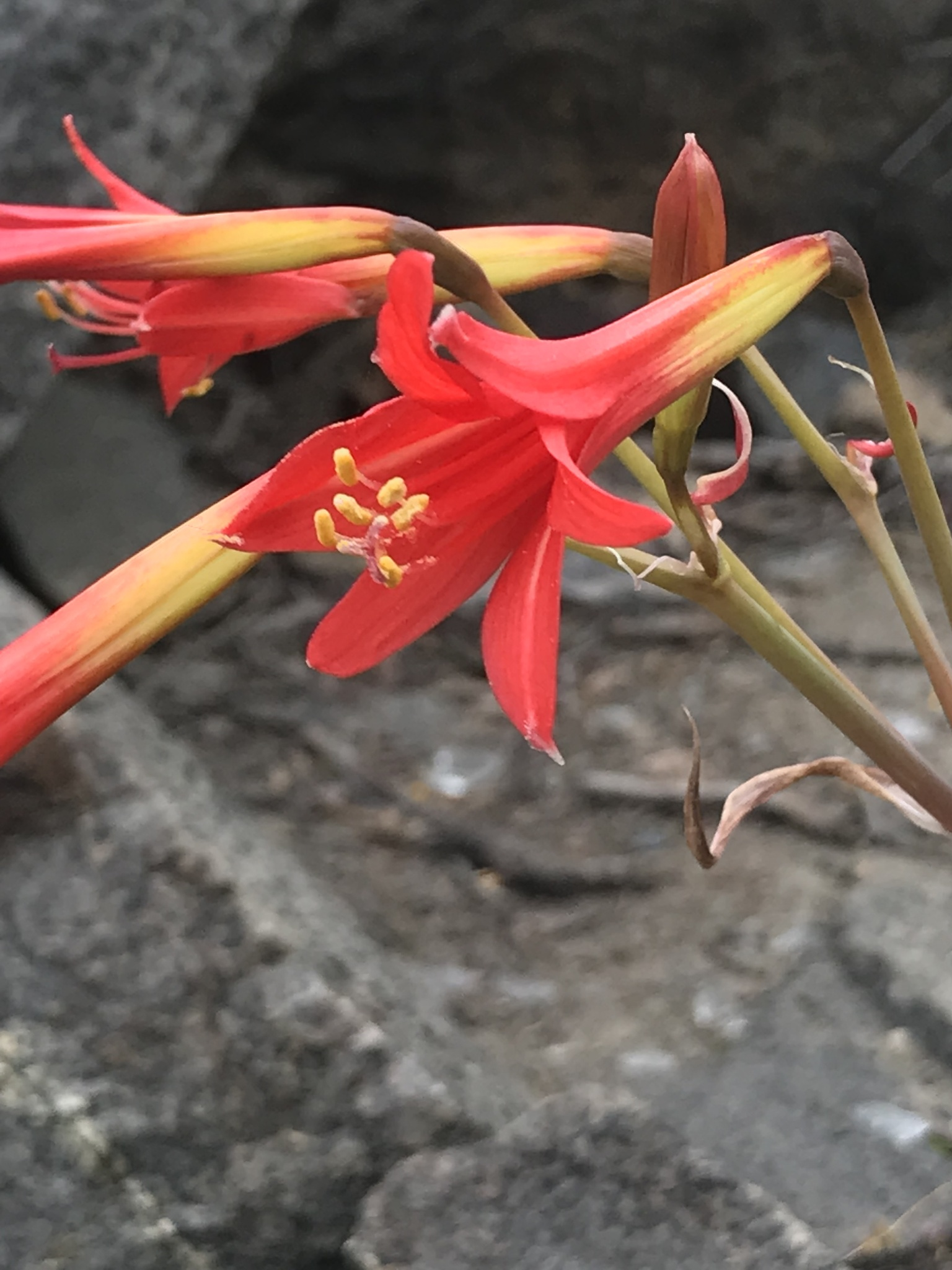
- Flowering Zephyranthes phycelloides

Scientific classification
- Kingdom: Plantae
- Clade: Tracheophytes
- Clade: Angiosperms
- Clade: Monocots
- Order: Asparagales
- Family: Amaryllidaceae
- Subfamily: Amaryllidoideae
- Genus: Zephyranthes
- Subgenus: Zephyranthes subg. Myostemma (Salisb.) Nic.García

Type species
- Zephyranthes advena (Ker Gawl.) Nic.García

Species
- See here

Synonyms
- Myostemma Salisb.; Famatina Ravenna; Bathya Ravenna

= Zephyranthes subg. Myostemma =

Subgenus of flowering plants

Zephyranthes subg. Myostemma is a subgenus of the genus Zephyranthes.

== Description ==
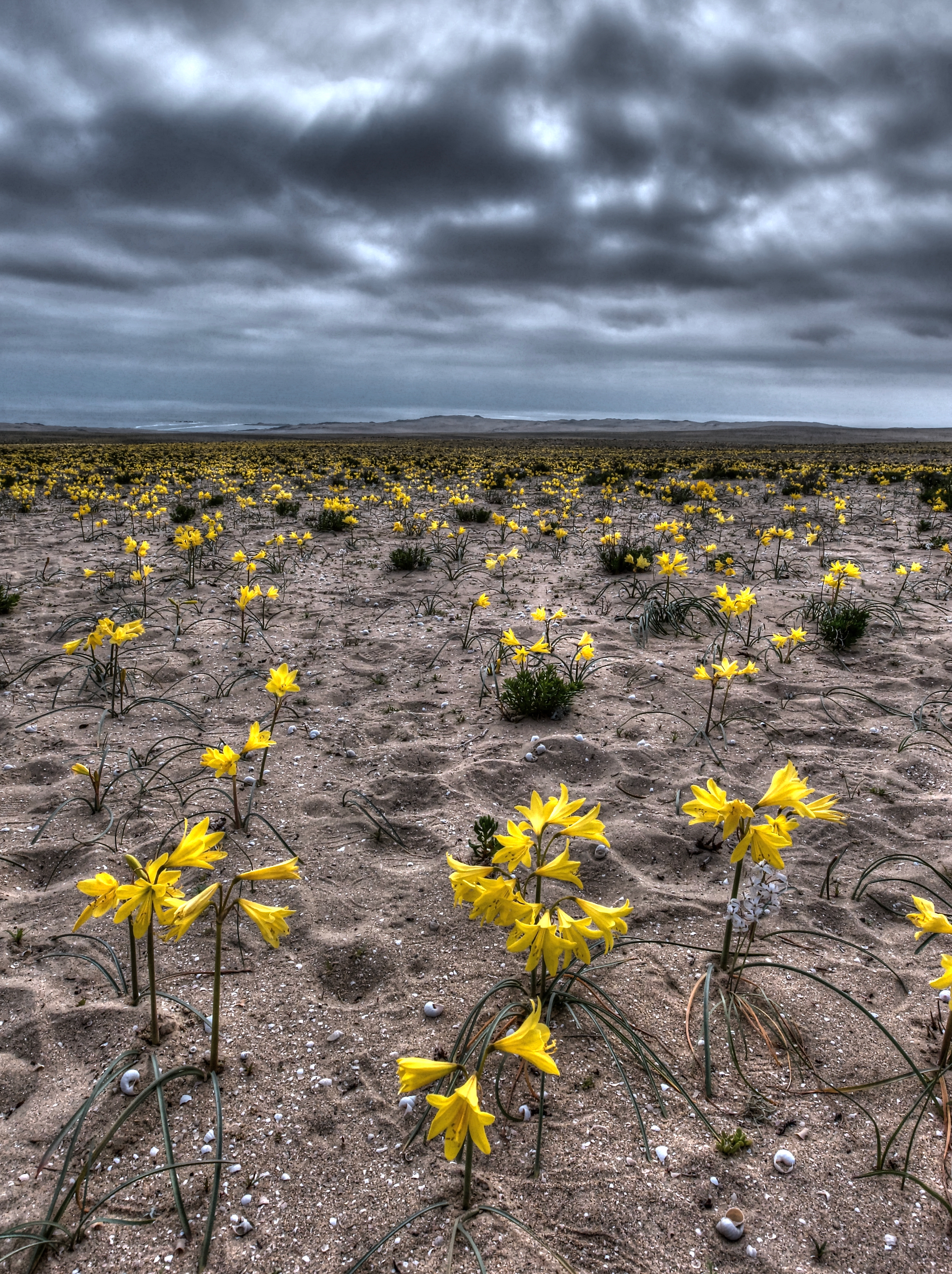
Zephyranthes bagnoldii flowering in its natural habitat

=== Vegetative characteristics ===
Zephyranthes subg. Myostemma are bulbous, 5–50 cm tall plants with ovoid to globose bulbs.

=== Generative characteristics ===
The pseudo-umbellate inflorescence bears 1–8 pedicellate, zygomorphic flowers.

=== Cytology ===
Various chromosome counts have been observed: 2n = 18, 36, 54, 72.

== Taxonomy ==
It was first published as Myostemma Salisb. by Richard Anthony Salisbury in 1866 with Myostemma advena (Ker Gawl.) Ravenna as the type species. It was merged into the genus Zephyranthes Herb. as Zephyranthes subg. Myostemma (Salisb.) Nic. García by Nicolás García Berguecio in 2019.

=== Species ===
It has about 17 species:

- Zephyranthes advena (Ker Gawl.) Nic.García
- Zephyranthes ananuca (Phil.) Nic.García
- Zephyranthes araucana (Phil.) Nic.García
- Zephyranthes bagnoldii (Herb.) Nic.García
- Zephyranthes berteroana (Phil.) Nic.García
- Zephyranthes capitata Nic.García
- Zephyranthes cisandina (Ravenna) Nic.García
- Zephyranthes cuyana Nic.García
- Zephyranthes elwesii (C.H.Wright) Nic.García
- Zephyranthes laeta (Phil.) Nic.García
- Zephyranthes maculata (L’Hér.) Nic.García
- Zephyranthes moelleri (Phil.) Nic.García
- Zephyranthes monantha (Ravenna) Nic.García
- Zephyranthes montana (Phil.) Nic.García
- Zephyranthes philippiana Nic.García
- Zephyranthes phycelloides (Herb.) Nic.García
- Zephyranthes splendens (Renjifo) Nic.García
