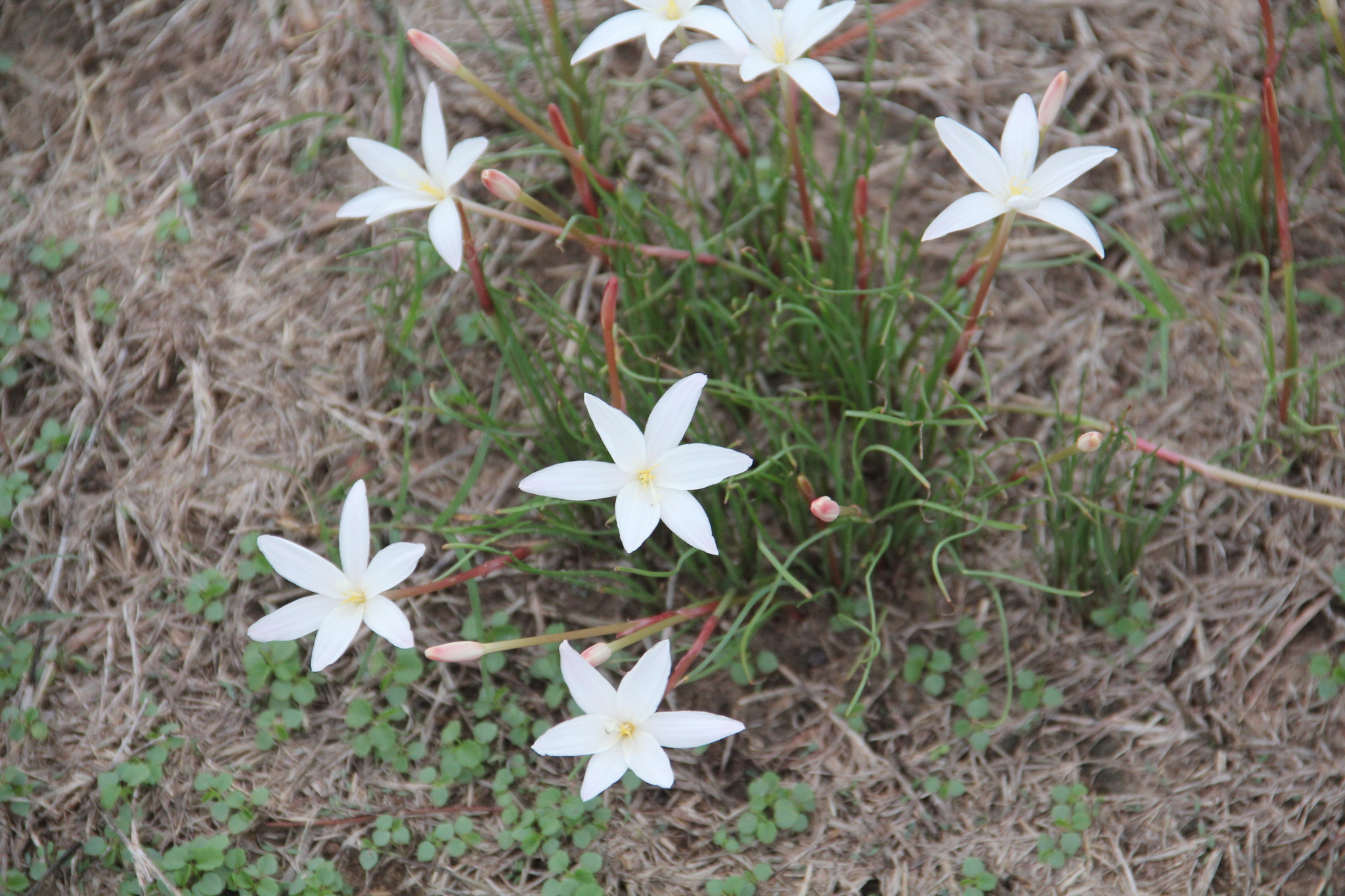

Scientific classification
- Kingdom: Plantae
- Clade: Tracheophytes
- Clade: Angiosperms
- Clade: Monocots
- Order: Asparagales
- Family: Amaryllidaceae
- Subfamily: Amaryllidoideae
- Genus: Zephyranthes
- Species: Z. traubii

Binomial name
- Zephyranthes traubii (W.Hayw.) Moldenke

Synonyms
- Cooperia traubii W.Hayw.; Hippeastrum smilakrokos Christenh. & Byng

= Zephyranthes traubii =

Species of flowering plant

Zephyranthes traubii, commonly known as Traub's rain lily, is a species of flowering plant in the Amaryllis family. It is found from Texas to northeast Mexico.

== Description ==
The leaf blades are dull green, and are up to 1 mm wide. The flowers are erect; the perianth is white, sometimes tinged pink, salverform, and is 11 to 15.4 cm (4.3 to 6.1 in). The perianth tube is primarily white, and is 9 to 12.6 cm (3.5 to 5.0 in) in diameter. The tepals are often reflexed. The stamens are fasciculate, appearing equal. The filaments are subulate, and are 0.2 to 0.4 cm (0.079 to 0.157 in). The anthers are 4 to 8 mm. The style is longer than the perianth tube. The stigma is capitate, and is exserted more than 2 mm beyond the anthers. The pedicel is absent.

It flowers from July to November.

== Distribution and habitat ==
It is found in Texas and northeast Mexico in sandy loam, open fields or coastal plains at elevations of 0 to 100 meters from sea level.
