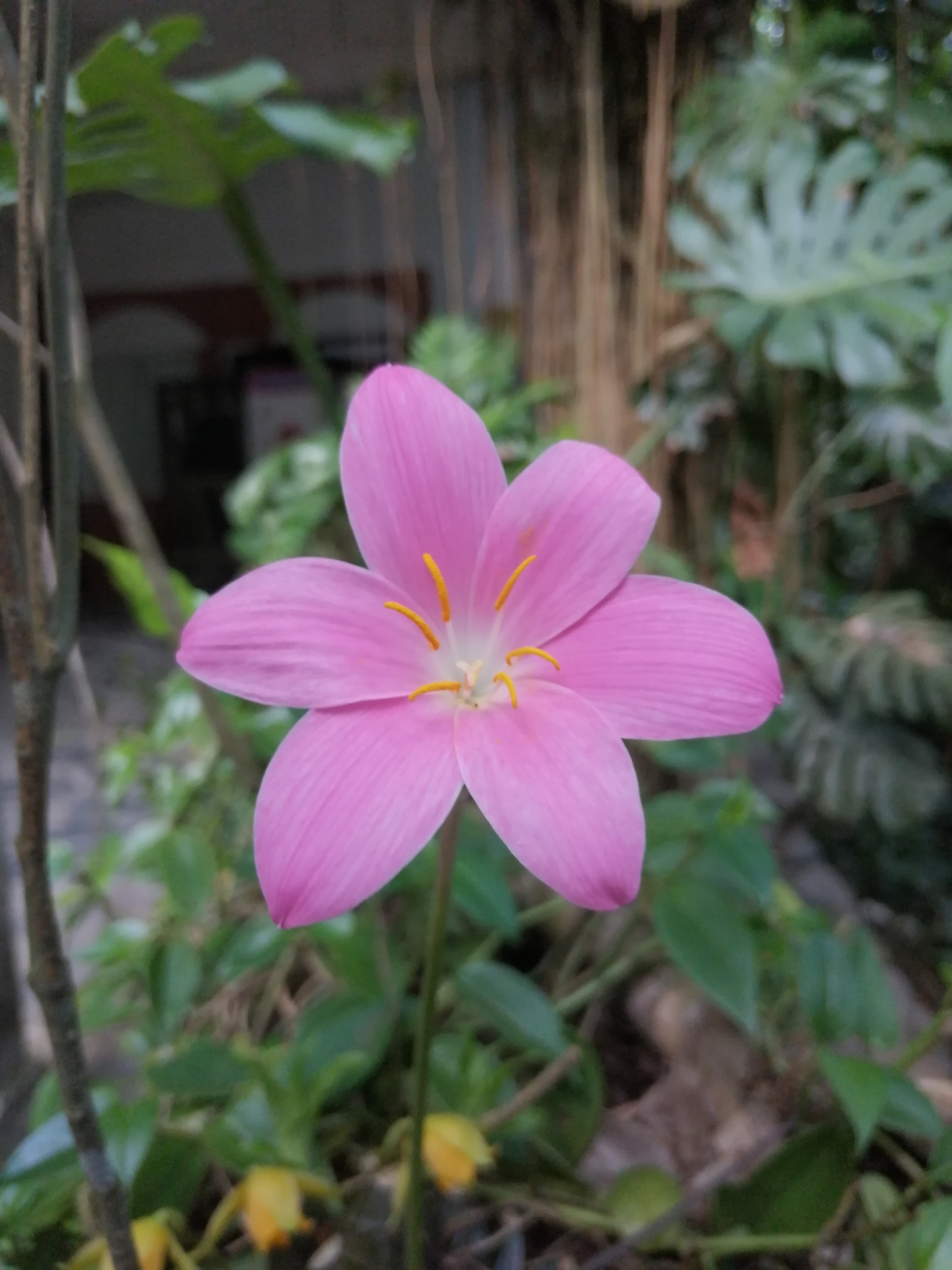

Scientific classification
- Kingdom: Plantae
- Clade: Tracheophytes
- Clade: Angiosperms
- Clade: Monocots
- Order: Asparagales
- Family: Amaryllidaceae
- Subfamily: Amaryllidoideae
- Genus: Zephyranthes
- Species: Z. macrosiphon

Binomial name
- Zephyranthes macrosiphon Baker

Synonyms
- Hippeastrum macrosiphon (Baker) Christenh. & Byng

= Zephyranthes macrosiphon =

Species of plant

Zephyranthes macrosiphon is a species of flowering plant in the family Amaryllidaceae, native to north-eastern and south-western Mexico. It was first described by John Gilbert Baker in 1881.
