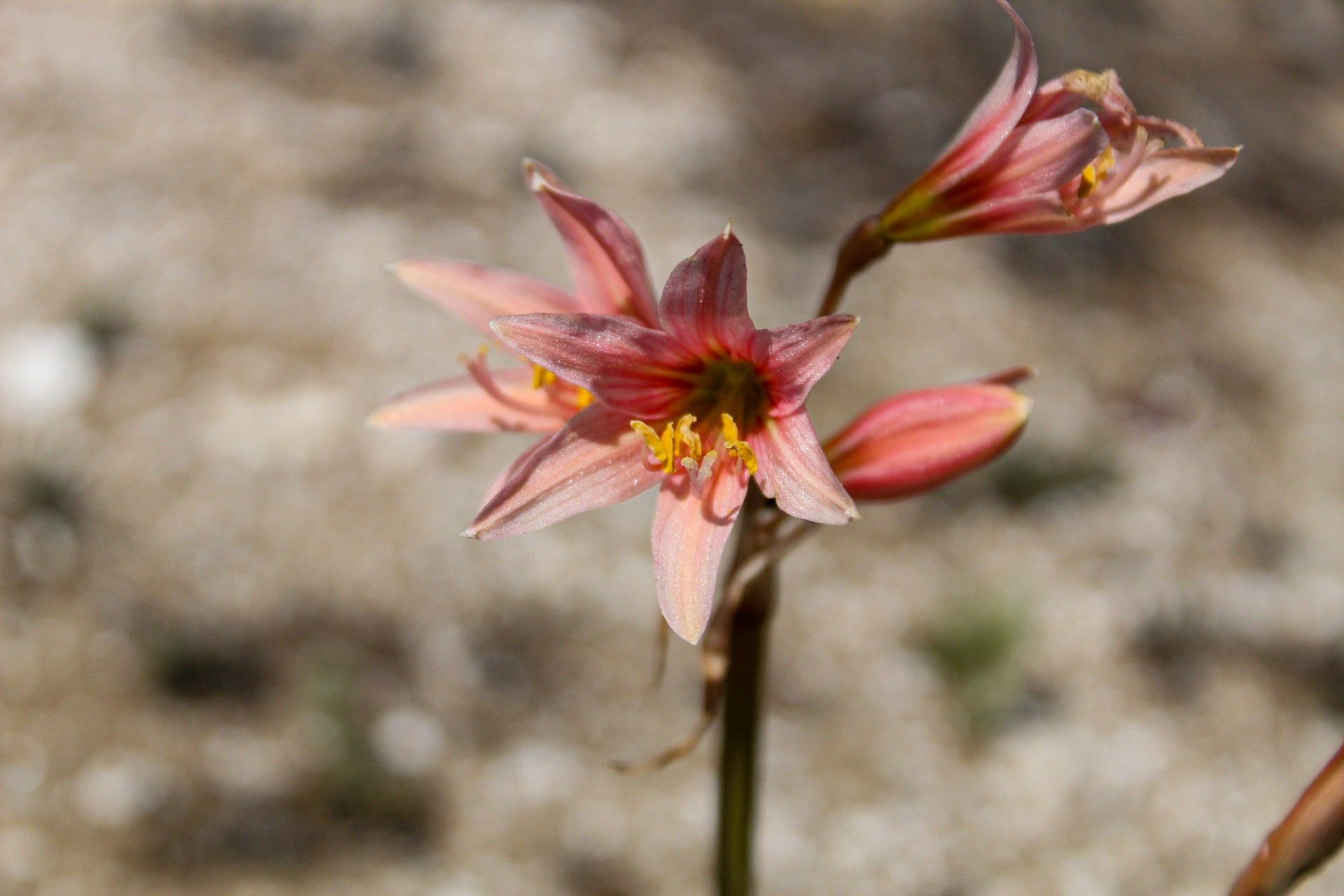

Scientific classification
- Kingdom: Plantae
- Clade: Tracheophytes
- Clade: Angiosperms
- Clade: Monocots
- Order: Asparagales
- Family: Amaryllidaceae
- Subfamily: Amaryllidoideae
- Genus: Zephyranthes
- Subgenus: Zephyranthes subg. Myostemma
- Species: Z. advena

Binomial name
- Zephyranthes advena (Ker Gawl.) Nic.García
- It is endemic to Chile

= Zephyranthes advena =

Species of plant

Zephyranthes advena is a species of flowering plant in the family Amaryllidaceae. It is a bulbous geophyte endemic to central Chile.

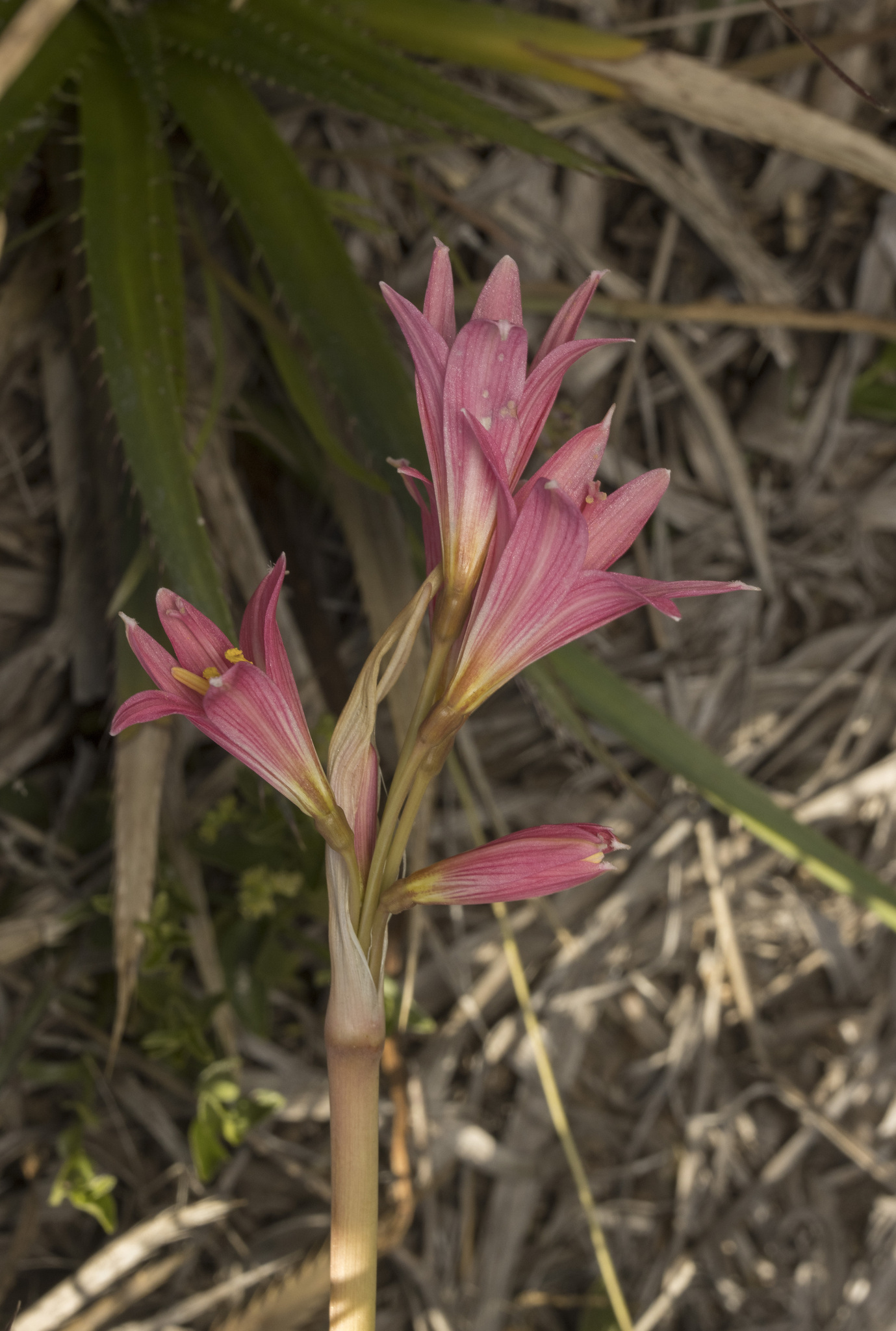
Zephyranthes advena in Chile

== Taxonomy ==
It was first published as Amaryllis advena Ker Gawl. by John Bellenden Ker in 1808. It was placed into the genus Zephyranthes Herb. as Zephyranthes advena (Ker Gawl.) Nic.García by Nicolás García Berguecio in 2019.

=== Etymology ===
The specific epithet advena means immigrant, outsider, foreigner, or stranger.

== Distribution ==
It occurs in Chile in the regions of Coquimbo, Valparaíso, Metropolitana, and Ñuble.
