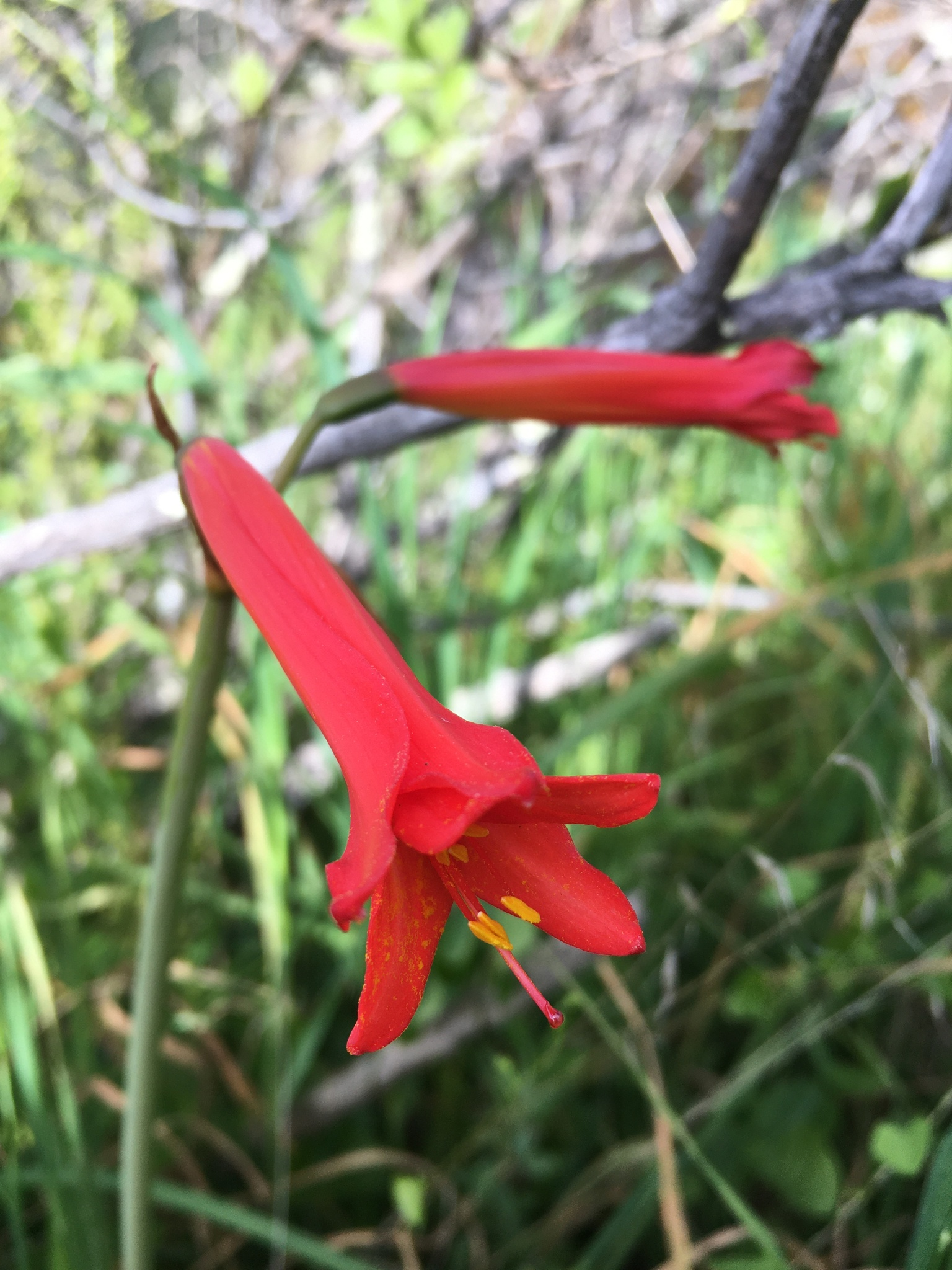

Scientific classification
- Kingdom: Plantae
- Clade: Tracheophytes
- Clade: Angiosperms
- Clade: Monocots
- Order: Asparagales
- Family: Amaryllidaceae
- Subfamily: Amaryllidoideae
- Genus: Phycella
- Species: P. cyrtanthoides

Binomial name
- Phycella cyrtanthoides (Sims) Lindl.

= Phycella cyrtanthoides =

Species of plant

Phycella cyrtanthoides, the Añañuca de Fuego, is a species of flowering plant in the family Amaryllidaceae. It is a bulbous geophyte endemic to central Chile.

Phycella cyrtanthoides is commonly known as añañuca in Chile, and the star Gliese 367 is named after it. Añañuca is, however, a common name also applied to other related species such as Zephyranthes phycelloides and Paposoa laeta.
