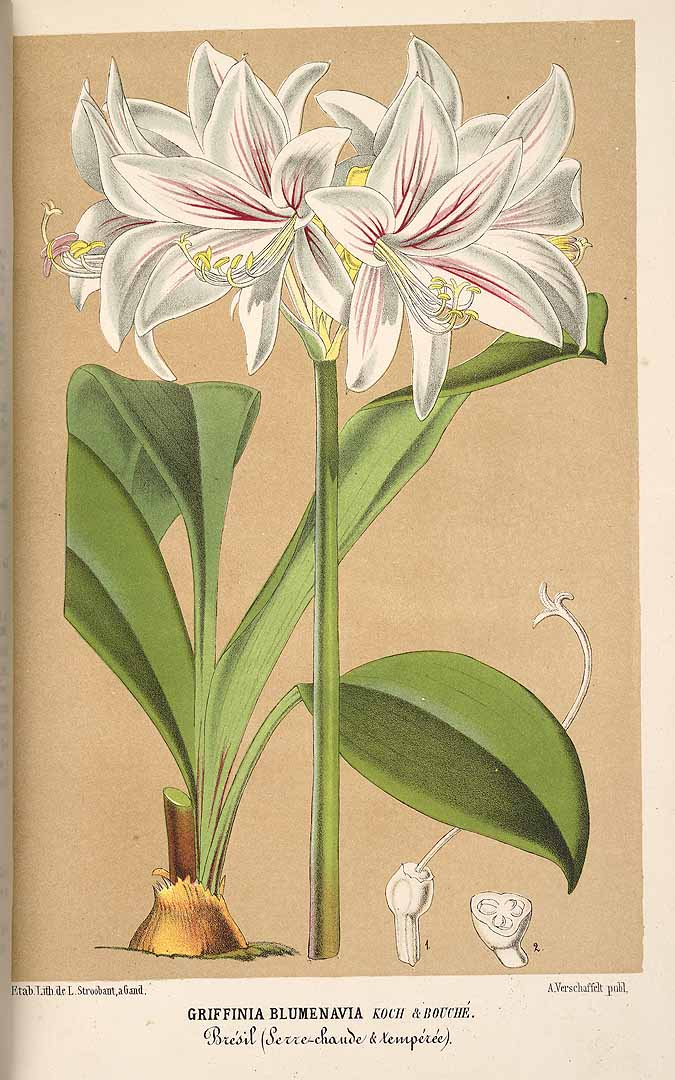

Scientific classification
- Kingdom: Plantae
- Clade: Tracheophytes
- Clade: Angiosperms
- Clade: Monocots
- Order: Asparagales
- Family: Amaryllidaceae
- Subfamily: Amaryllidoideae
- Genus: Zephyranthes
- Subgenus: Zephyranthes subg. Eithea
- Species: Z. blumenavia

Binomial name
- Zephyranthes blumenavia (K.Koch & C.D.Bouché ex Carrière) Nic.García & Dutilh

Synonyms
- Amaryllis blumenavia (K.Koch & C.D.Bouché ex Carrière) Traub; Eithea blumenavia (K.Koch & C.D.Bouché ex Carrière) Ravenna; Griffinia blumenavia K.Koch & C.D.Bouché ex Carrière; Hippeastrum blumenavia (K.Koch & C.D.Bouché ex Carrière) Sealy; Amaryllis iguapensis (R.Wagner) Traub & Uphof; Hippeastrum iguapense R.Wagner

= Zephyranthes blumenavia =

Species of flowering plant

Zephyranthes blumenavia is a plant species in the family Amaryllidaceae, endemic to southern Brazil. It occurs in the states of Paraná, Santa Catarina, and São Paulo.
