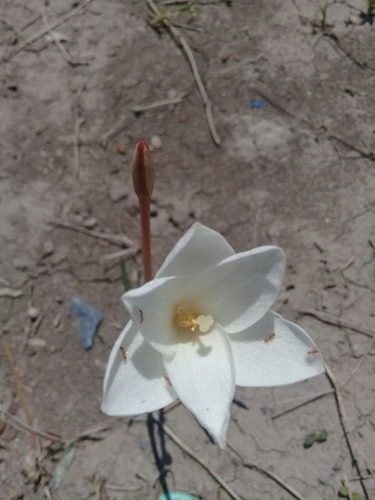

Scientific classification
- Kingdom: Plantae
- Clade: Tracheophytes
- Clade: Angiosperms
- Clade: Monocots
- Order: Asparagales
- Family: Amaryllidaceae
- Subfamily: Amaryllidoideae
- Genus: Zephyranthes
- Species: Z. longituba

Binomial name
- Zephyranthes longituba Flory ex Flagg & G.Lom.Sm.

Synonyms
- Hippeastrum longitubum (Flory ex Flagg & G.Lom.Sm.) Christenh. & Byng

= Zephyranthes longituba =

Species of flowering plant

Zephyranthes longituba is a species of flowering plant in the family Amaryllidaceae. It is a bulbous geophyte that grows primarily in the desert in Coahuila and San Luis Potosí.
