= Zephyranthes sessilis =

Scientific classification
- Kingdom: Plantae
- Clade: Tracheophytes
- Clade: Angiosperms
- Clade: Monocots
- Order: Asparagales
- Family: Amaryllidaceae
- Subfamily: Amaryllidoideae
- Genus: Zephyranthes
- Species: Z. sessilis

Binomial name
- Zephyranthes sessilis Herb.

Synonyms
- Hippeastrum sessile (Herb.) Christenh. & Byng; Amaryllis sessilis (Herb.) Duch.

Species of flowering plant

Zephyranthes sessilis is a species of flowering plant in the family Amaryllidaceae, native to central, northeastern and southwestern Mexico. It was first described by William Herbert in 1837.
