= Zephyranthes pulchella =

Scientific classification
- Kingdom: Plantae
- Clade: Tracheophytes
- Clade: Angiosperms
- Clade: Monocots
- Order: Asparagales
- Family: Amaryllidaceae
- Subfamily: Amaryllidoideae
- Genus: Zephyranthes
- Species: Z. pulchella

Binomial name
- Zephyranthes pulchella J.G.Sm.

Synonyms
- Atamasco pulchella (J.G.Sm.) Greene; Hippeastrum pulchellum (J.G.Sm.) Christenh. & Byng

Species of flowering plant

Zephyranthes pulchella, the showy zephyrlily, is a perennial species of flowering plant in the family Amaryllidaceae. It is found from Texas to northeast Mexico at elevations of 0 to 400 meters from sea level.

== Description ==
It is a geophytic perennial herb that grows up to 16 inches tall. The leaf blades are dull green, and are up to 3 mm wide. The spathe is 1.9 to 3.8 cm (0.75 to 1.50 in). The flowers are erect; the funnelform perianth is cadmium yellow, and is 1.9 to 6 cm (0.75 to 2.36 in); the perianth tube is green, and is 0.2 to 1 cm; the tepals are rarely reflexed; the stamens diverge, and appear equal; the filaments are filiform, and are 0.5 to 1.5 cm (0.20 to 0.59 in); the anthers are 3 to 7 mm; the style is longer than the perianth tube; the stigma is capitate, and is usually among the anthers; the pedicel is 0.3 to 4.4 cm (0.12 to 1.73 in), and is sometimes longer than the spathe.

It flowers from May to December.

== Distribution and habitat ==
It is found in Texas and northeast Mexico at elevations of 0 to 400 meters from sea level in sandy-loam open fields, swales, ditches and coastal plains.
