= Zephyranthes refugiensis =

Refugio zephyrlily

Scientific classification
- Kingdom: Plantae
- Clade: Tracheophytes
- Clade: Angiosperms
- Clade: Monocots
- Order: Asparagales
- Family: Amaryllidaceae
- Subfamily: Amaryllidoideae
- Genus: Zephyranthes
- Species: Z. refugiensis

Binomial name
- Zephyranthes refugiensis F.B.Jones

Species of flowering plant

Zephyranthes refugiensis, the Refugio zephyrlily, is a rare plant species known from only two counties in southern Texas (Goliad and Refugio).

Zephyranthes refugiensis is a perennial herb producing bulbs. Flowers are funnel-shaped, lemon-yellow, usually solitary.
