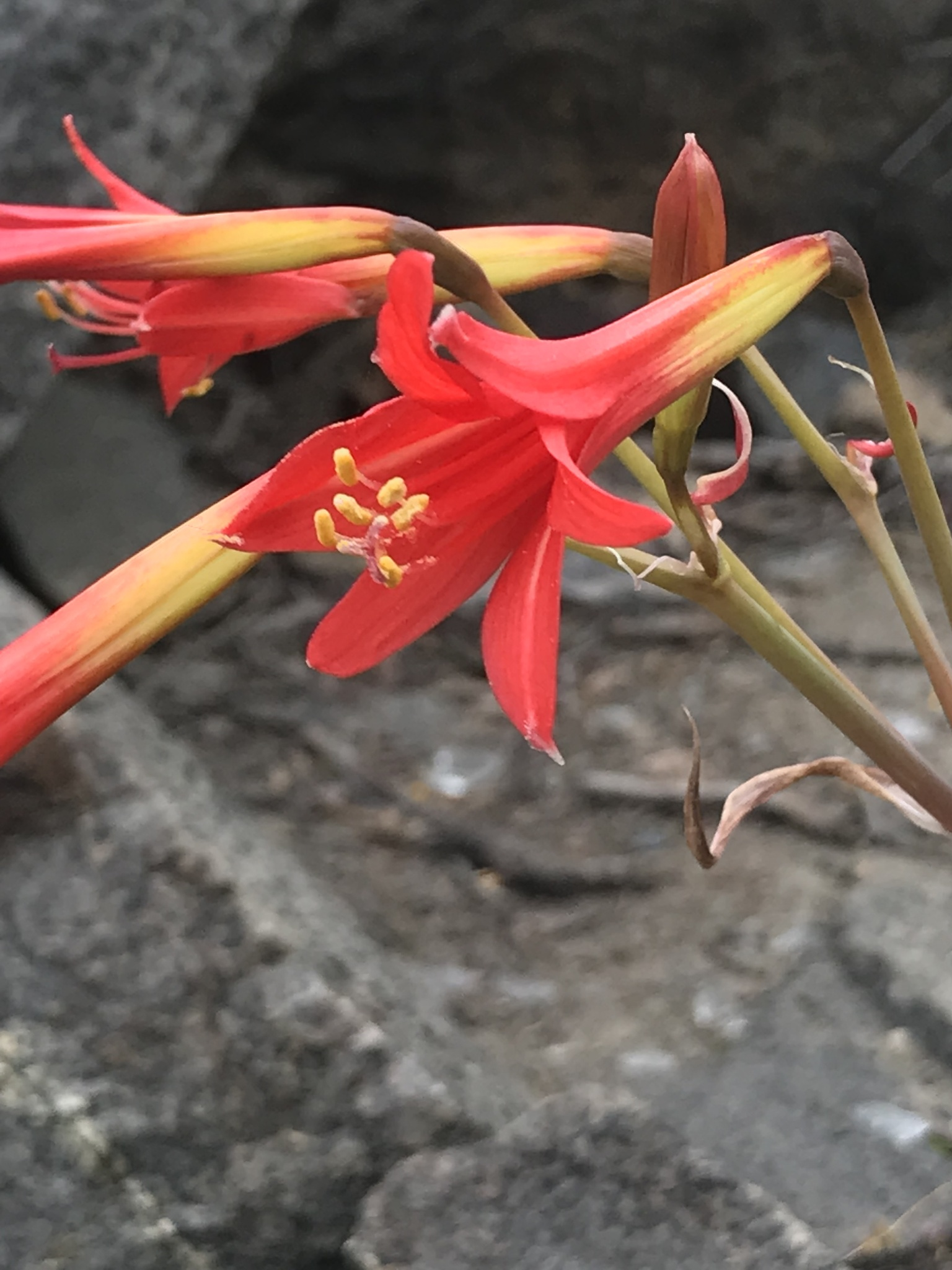

Scientific classification
- Kingdom: Plantae
- Clade: Tracheophytes
- Clade: Angiosperms
- Clade: Monocots
- Order: Asparagales
- Family: Amaryllidaceae
- Subfamily: Amaryllidoideae
- Genus: Zephyranthes
- Subgenus: Zephyranthes subg. Myostemma
- Species: Z. phycelloides

Binomial name
- Zephyranthes phycelloides (Herb.) Nic.García

Synonyms
- Amaryllis phycelloides (Herb.) Steud.; Habranthus phycelloides Herb.; Hippeastrum phycelloides (Herb.) Baker; Myostemma phycelloides (Herb.) Ravenna; Phycella phycelloides (Herb.) Traub; Rhodophiala phycelloides (Herb.) Hunz.

= Zephyranthes phycelloides =

Species of plant

Zephyranthes phycelloides, commonly known as añañuca roja, is a species of flowering plant in the family Amaryllidaceae. It is a bulbous geophyte endemic to central Chile. It is morphologically similar to other species of its genus, but also notably to Phycella cyrtanthoides. Z. phycelloides, however, has a trifid (three lobed) stigma as opposed to the capitated (rounded) stigma of P. crytanthoides.

The species was formerly known as Rhodophiala phycelloides.
