= Zephyranthes katheriniae =

Scientific classification
- Kingdom: Plantae
- Clade: Tracheophytes
- Clade: Angiosperms
- Clade: Monocots
- Order: Asparagales
- Family: Amaryllidaceae
- Subfamily: Amaryllidoideae
- Genus: Zephyranthes
- Species: Z. katheriniae

Binomial name
- Zephyranthes katheriniae L.B.Spencer

Synonyms
- Hippeastrum katheriniae (L.B.Spencer) Christenh. & Byng

Species of flowering plant

Zephyranthes katheriniae is a species of flowering plant in the family Amaryllidaceae. It is found in Mexico.

== Description ==
The bulb is ovoid, 2 cm in diameter. The leaves are erect, usually 25 to 35 cm (9.8 to 13.8 in) long and 2-3 mm wide. The scape is 18 to 25 cm (7.1 to 9.8 in) long. The bifid spathe is pink, and is 2.7 to 3 cm long. The pedicel is 2.8 to 3.8 cm (1.1 to 1.5 in) cm long. The ovary is 4 mm. The perianth tube is slender, and is 2 cm long. The perianth is yellow, heavily flushed with red, and is 5.5 to 6 cm long including the perianth tube. The segments are "obovate, acuminate". The stamens are half the length of the segments. The stigma is shortly trifid, and subtends the anthers.

== Distribution ==
It is found in Hidalgo, Querétaro de Arteaga, and San Luis Potosí.
