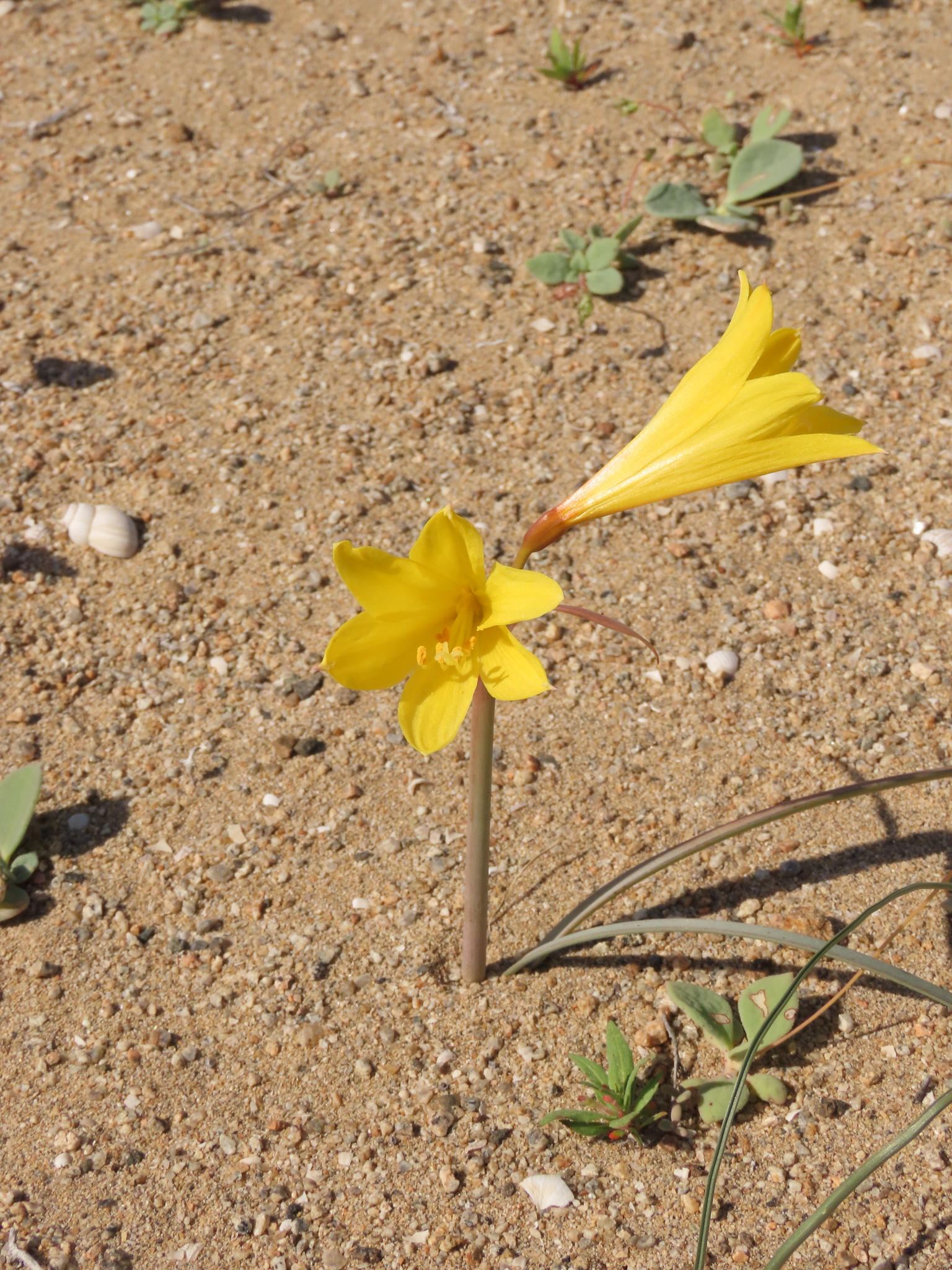

Scientific classification
- Kingdom: Plantae
- Clade: Tracheophytes
- Clade: Angiosperms
- Clade: Monocots
- Order: Asparagales
- Family: Amaryllidaceae
- Subfamily: Amaryllidoideae
- Genus: Zephyranthes
- Subgenus: Zephyranthes subg. Myostemma
- Species: Z. bagnoldii

Binomial name
- Zephyranthes bagnoldii (Herb.) Nic.García

Synonyms
- Amaryllis bagnoldii (Herb.) D.Dietr.; Habranthus bagnoldii Herb.; Hippeastrum bagnoldii (Herb.) Baker; Myostemma bagnoldii (Herb.) J.M.Watson & A.R.Flores; Rhodophiala bagnoldii (Herb.) Traub; Amaryllis bagnoldii var. minor (Speg.) Traub; Habranthus punctatus Herb.; Hippeastrum bagnoldii var. minor Speg.; Hippeastrum punctatum (Herb.) Phil.

= Zephyranthes bagnoldii =

Species of plant

Zephyranthes bagnoldii is a species of flowering plant in the family Amaryllidaceae. It is a bulbous geophyte endemic to central Chile.
