= Dutilh =

Dutilh is a given name and a surname. Notable people with the name include:

== Middle name ==
- Catarina Dutilh Novaes, Brazilian and Dutch philosopher
- Stephen Francis Dutilh Rigaud (1777-1861), English painter

== Surname ==
- Adya van Rees-Dutilh (1876–1959), Dutch textile artist, painter, and graphic artist

== See also ==
- NautaDutilh, an independent law firm
