= Zephyranthes elegans =

Scientific classification
- Kingdom: Plantae
- Clade: Tracheophytes
- Clade: Angiosperms
- Clade: Monocots
- Order: Asparagales
- Family: Amaryllidaceae
- Subfamily: Amaryllidoideae
- Genus: Zephyranthes
- Species: Z. elegans

Binomial name
- Zephyranthes elegans Ravenna

Synonyms
- Hippeastrum lilium Christenh. & Byng

Species of flowering plant

Zephyranthes elegans is a species of flowering plants in the Amaryllis family, subfamily Amaryllidoideae. It is native to Bolivia.

== Taxonomy ==
Zephyranthes elegans was first named and described in 1999 by Pierfelice Ravenna.
