= Zephyranthes simpsonii =

Scientific classification
- Kingdom: Plantae
- Clade: Tracheophytes
- Clade: Angiosperms
- Clade: Monocots
- Order: Asparagales
- Family: Amaryllidaceae
- Subfamily: Amaryllidoideae
- Genus: Zephyranthes
- Species: Z. simpsonii

Binomial name
- Zephyranthes simpsonii Chapm.

Synonyms
- Atamasco simpsonii (Chapm.) Greene; Hippeastrum simpsonii (Chapm.) Christenh. & Byng

Species of flowering plant

Zephyranthes simpsonii, known by a number of common names including redmargin zephyr-lily, Simpson's zephyr-lily, Florida atamasco-lily, and Simpson's rain-lily, is a geophytic perennial herb that grows up to 10 inches tall. It is found from the southeastern United States.

== Taxonomy ==
It was first named and described in 1892 by Alvan Wentworth Chapman.

== Description ==
It is a geophytic perennial herb that grows up to 10 inches (25 cm) tall. The leaf blades are dull green, and are up to 4 mm wide. The spathe is 1.7 to 4.2 cm (0.67 to 1.65 in). The flowers are erect; the funnelform perianth is 4 to 10 cm (1.6 to 3.9 in), and is mostly white proximally, often with pink or purple distally; the perianth tube is 1.4 to 4 cm (0.55 to 1.57 in), and is green; the tepals slightly diverge, and are rarely reflexed; The stamens diverge, and appear equal; the filaments are filiform, and are 1.5 to 3.2 cm (0.59 to 1.26 in); the anthers are 3 to 8 mm; the style is longer than the perianth tube; the stigma is 3-fid, and is usually among or below the anthers. The pedicel is absent or up to 1.5 cm.

It flowers from February to May.

== Distribution and habitat ==
It is found in the southeastern United States (Florida, Alabama, Georgia, Mississippi, North Carolina, South Carolina).

=== Habitat ===
It grows in peaty-sandy soil, coastal plains and rarely piedmont at elevations of 0 to 100 meters from sea level.
