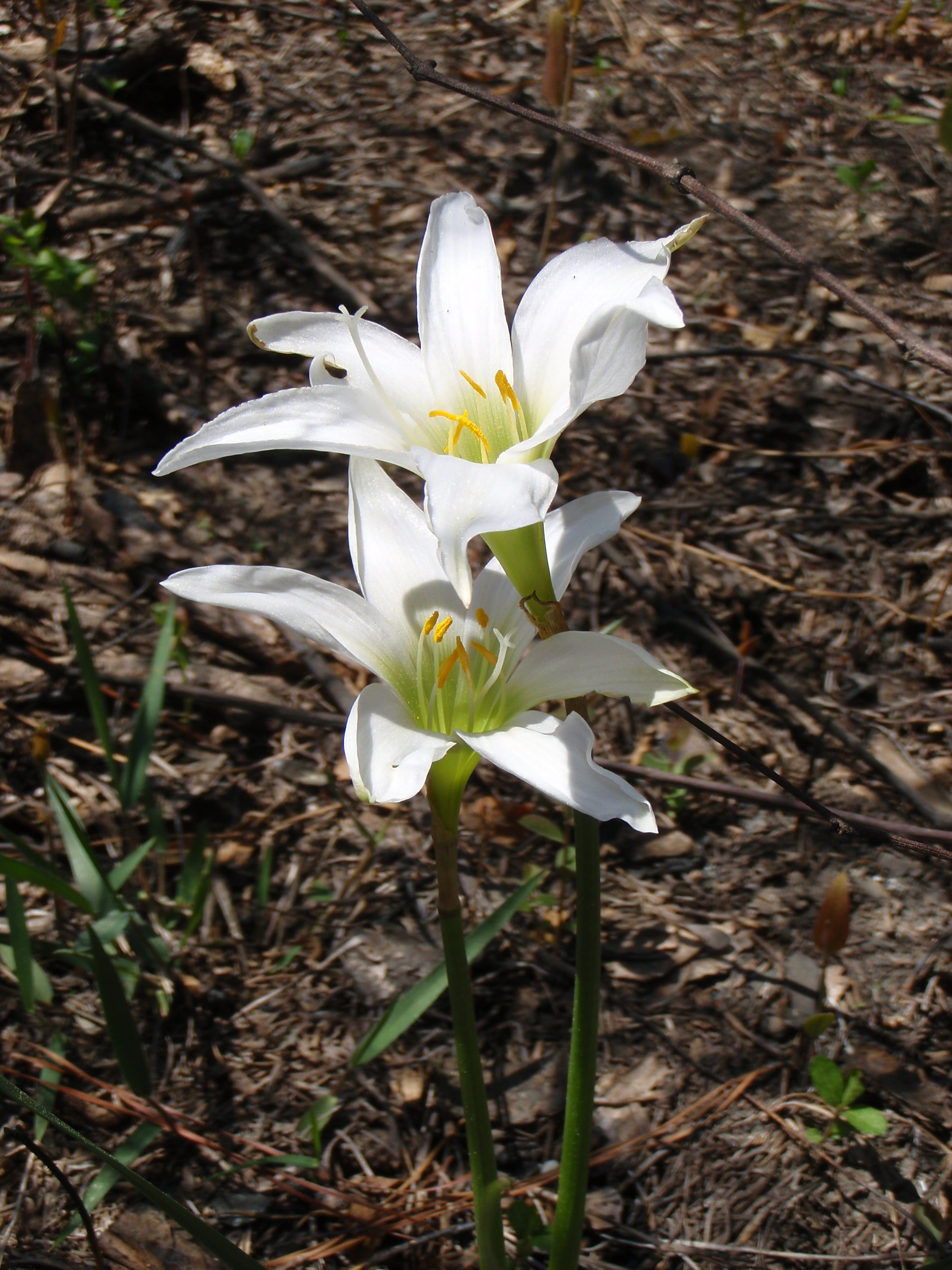

Scientific classification
- Kingdom: Plantae
- Clade: Embryophytes
- Clade: Tracheophytes
- Clade: Angiosperms
- Clade: Monocots
- Order: Asparagales
- Family: Amaryllidaceae
- Subfamily: Amaryllidoideae
- Genus: Zephyranthes
- Species: Z. treatiae

Binomial name
- Zephyranthes treatiae S.Watson

= Zephyranthes treatiae =

Species of flowering plant

Zephyranthes treatiae is a species of amaryllis described by Sereno Watson. It is a bulbous geophyte. There are no currently accepted subspecies.

== Distribution ==
The distribution is in the continental North America, specifically southern Georgia to Florida.

== Gallery ==
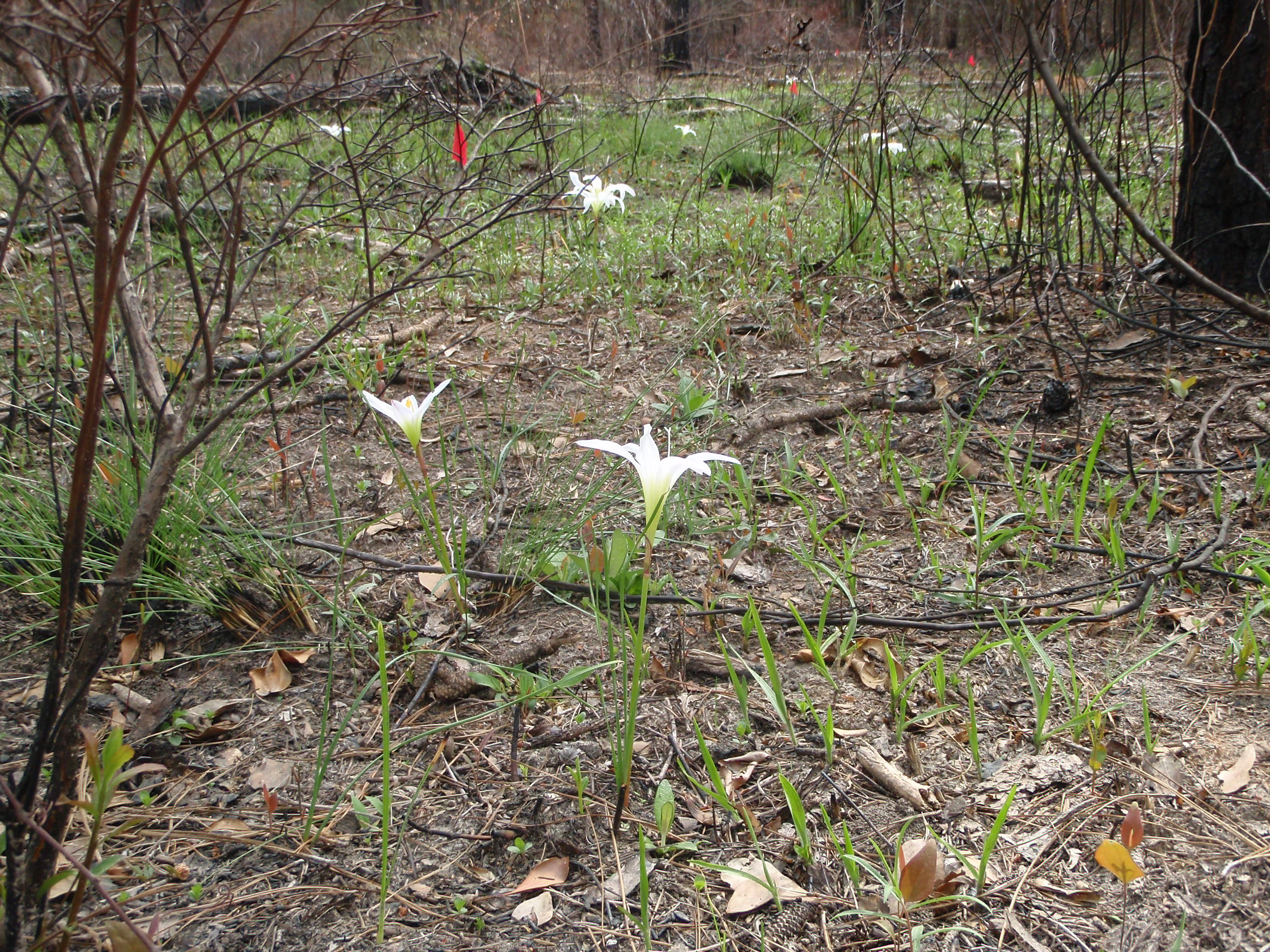

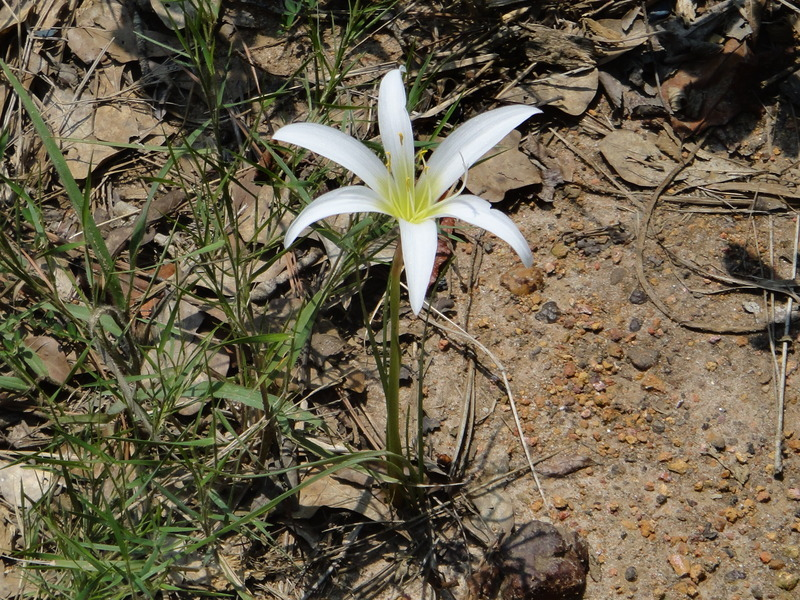

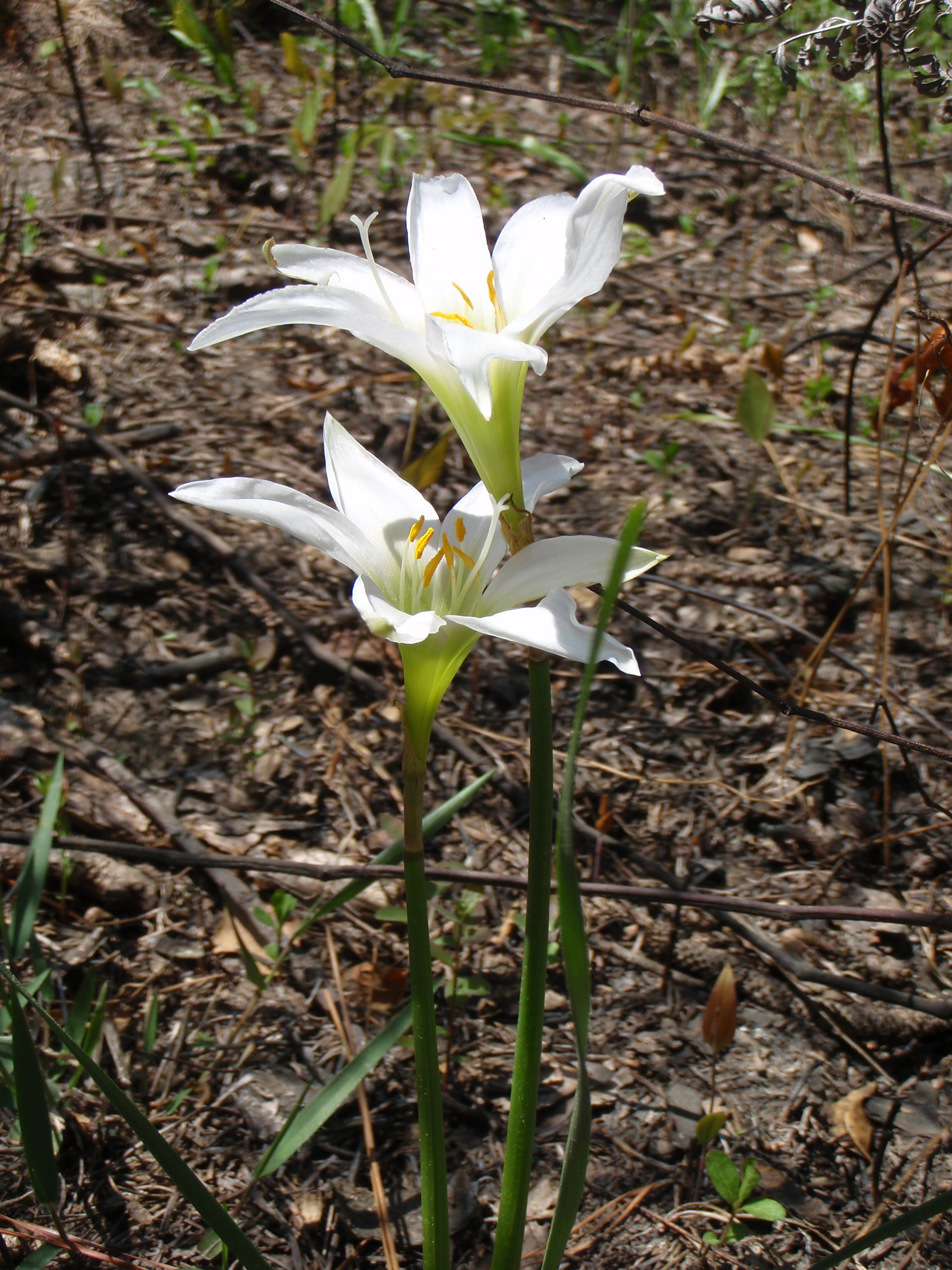
