= Zephyranthes puertoricensis =

Puerto Rico zephyr lily

Conservation status
- Secure (NatureServe)

Scientific classification
- Kingdom: Plantae
- Clade: Tracheophytes
- Clade: Angiosperms
- Clade: Monocots
- Order: Asparagales
- Family: Amaryllidaceae
- Subfamily: Amaryllidoideae
- Genus: Zephyranthes
- Species: Z. puertoricensis

Binomial name
- Zephyranthes puertoricensis Traub

Species of flowering plant

Zephyranthes puertoricensis, known commonly as the Puerto Rico zephyr lily, is a species of flowering plant in the amaryllis family, Amaryllidaceae, subfamily Amaryllidoideae. It is native to the West Indies, Panama, Colombia, Suriname and Venezuela. It is a member of low elevation grasslands communities and moist forest habitat.

The plant grows from a bulb about 1.5 centimeters wide, producing shiny, dark green, linear leaves up to about 35 centimeters long and a scape about 9 to 11 centimeters tall. The greenish white tepals are about 4 centimeters long.
