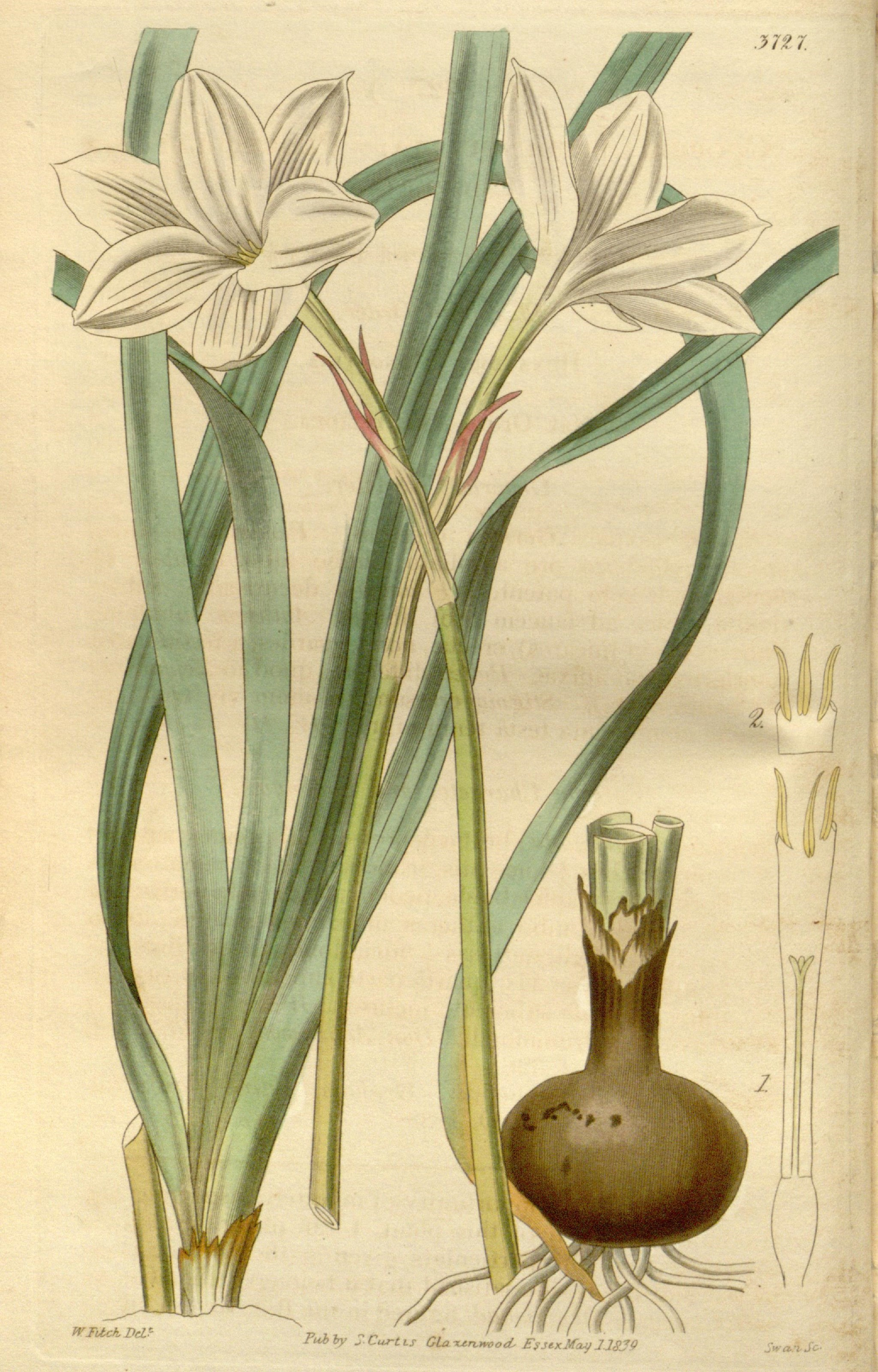
- Botanical illustration

Scientific classification
- Kingdom: Plantae
- Clade: Tracheophytes
- Clade: Angiosperms
- Clade: Monocots
- Order: Asparagales
- Family: Amaryllidaceae
- Subfamily: Amaryllidoideae
- Genus: Zephyranthes
- Species: Z. drummondii

Binomial name
- Zephyranthes drummondii D.Don

Synonyms
- Cooperia oberwettii Percy-Lanc.; Cooperia pedunculata Herb.; Hippeastrum drummondii (D.Don) Christenh. & Byng; Sceptranthes drummondii (D.Don) Graham

= Zephyranthes drummondii =

Species of flowering plant

Zephyranthes drummondii, commonly known as Evening rain lily, evening star rain lily, giant rain lily, hill country rain lily, prairie lily, or rain lily, is a perennial species of flowering plant in the amaryllis family. It is found from northwest Florida to northeast Mexico.

== Description ==
It is a perennial herb that grows 16 to 45 cm (6.3 to 17.7 in) tall. The leaf blades are glaucous-green, and are up to 8 mm (0.31 in) wide. The spathe is 3–5 cm long. The flowers are erect; the funnelform perianth is 6 to 9 cm (2.4 to 3.5 in) long and is white, sometimes "flushed pink abaxially". The perianth tube is white to green, and is 3 to 4.7 cm (1.2 to 1.9 in) long. The tepals are rarely reflexed. The stamens are fasciculate, and are distinctly subequal. The filaments are subulate, and are 0.1 to 0.2 cm long. The anthers are 5 to 8 mm (0.20 to 0.31 in) long.

It flowers from March to August.

== Distribution and habitat ==
It is found in Florida, Texas, Louisiana and northeast Mexico from elevations of 0 to 900 meters from sea level. It grows in sandy or rocky, usually calcareous soils.
