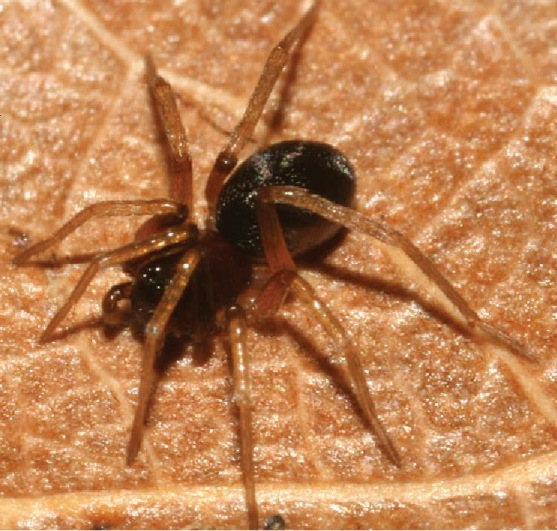
- A juvenile Zodarion styliferum

Scientific classification
- Kingdom: Animalia
- Phylum: Arthropoda
- Subphylum: Chelicerata
- Class: Arachnida
- Order: Araneae
- Infraorder: Araneomorphae
- Family: Zodariidae
- Genus: Zodarion
- Species: Z. styliferum

Binomial name
- Zodarion styliferum (Simon, 1870)

Subspecies
- Zodarion styliferum extraneum Denis, 1935 — Portugal; Zodarion styliferum styliferum

= Zodarion styliferum =

Species of spider

Zodarion styliferum is a species or Araneomorph spider that belongs to the family Zordariidae (ant spiders). It is native to the Iberian Peninsula being found in Portugal, Spain and Madeira.

== Taxonomy ==
Zodarion styliferum is an Araneomorph spider that belongs to a family of spiders known as ant spiders, Zordariidae. This family is one of the most species-rich families of spiders containing more than 940+ species that are distributed across the Mediterranean region of Europe and the Iberian Peninsula. The genus it belongs to (Zodarion) is a very diverse genus being one of the most species-rich genera of the family containing more than 160+ species. Thid means that it has been divided into several species groups where Zodarion styliferum is a member of the styliferum species group. This group includes Z. algarvense, Z. gregua, Z. jozefienae , Z. merlijni, Z. rudyi and Z. segurense.

There are two recognized subspecies within this species. These two are listed below:

• Z. styliferum styliferum

• Z. styliferum extraneum

== Distribution ==
This species is distributed in Western Europe and more specifically the Iberian Peninsula. Their range includes Portugal, Spain and Madeira (including the island of Porto Santo).

== Behavior ==
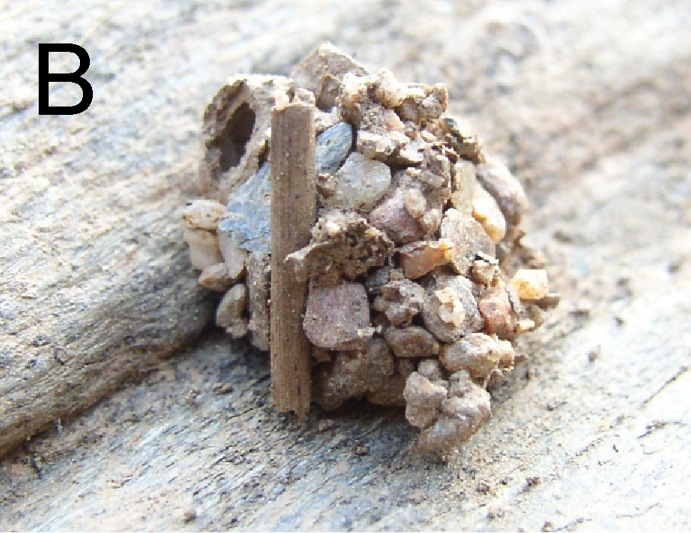
A juvenile Zodarion styliferum retreating into its spider-igloo, a common behavior for members of its genus.

Similarly to other members of its own genus, they remain in igloo-shaped retreats during the day. These retreats are often found attached to the undersides of rocks or dead pieces of wood. These igloo-retreats provides this species protection against unfavorable environmental conditions and potential predators such as ants.

=== Parasitism ===
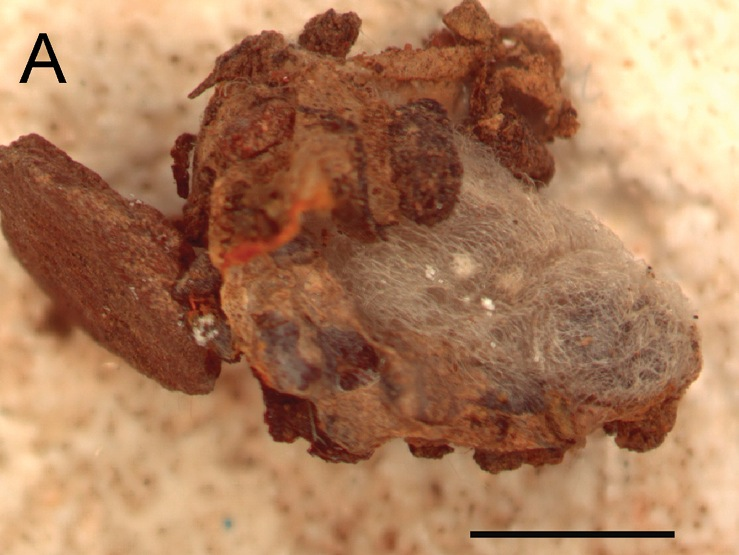
Image shows the pupa of the parasitic wasp species Gelis apterus inside spider-igloo of Zodarion styliferum. The scale bar is 2 mm.

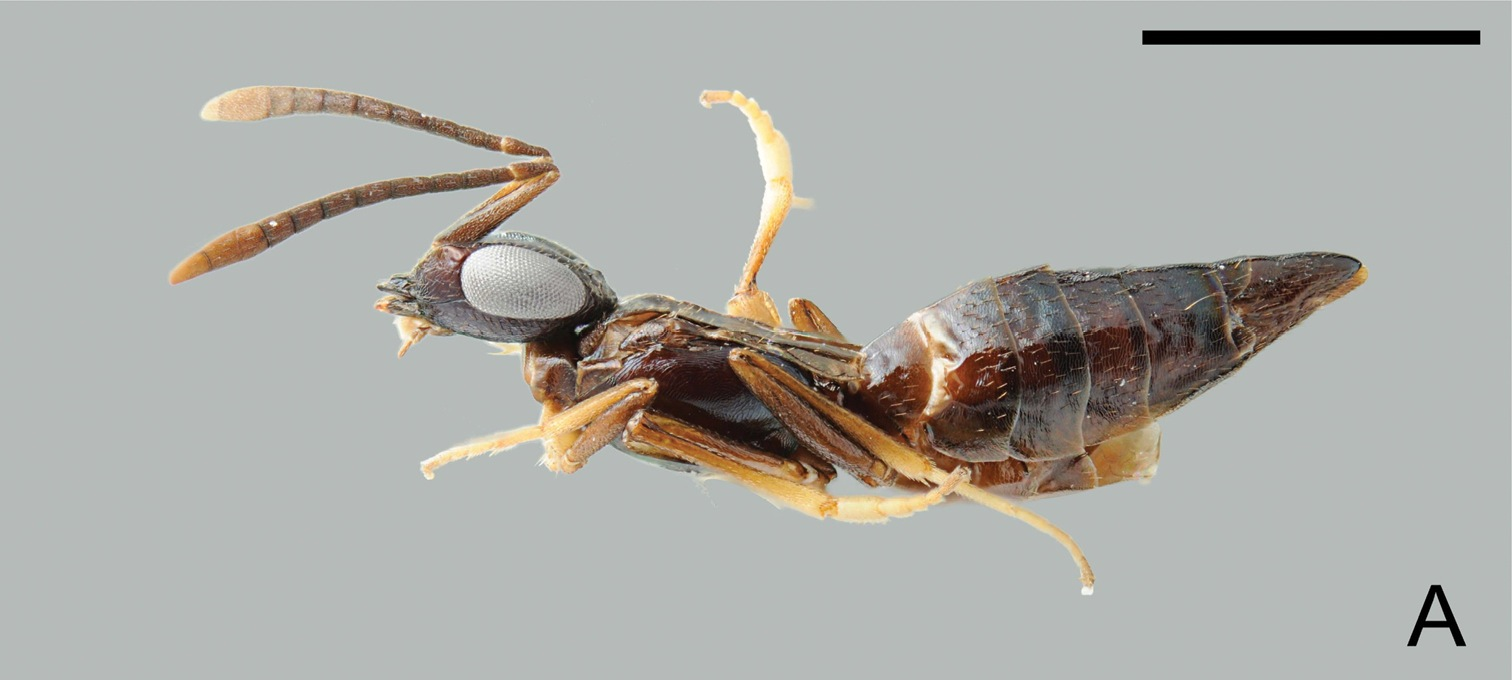
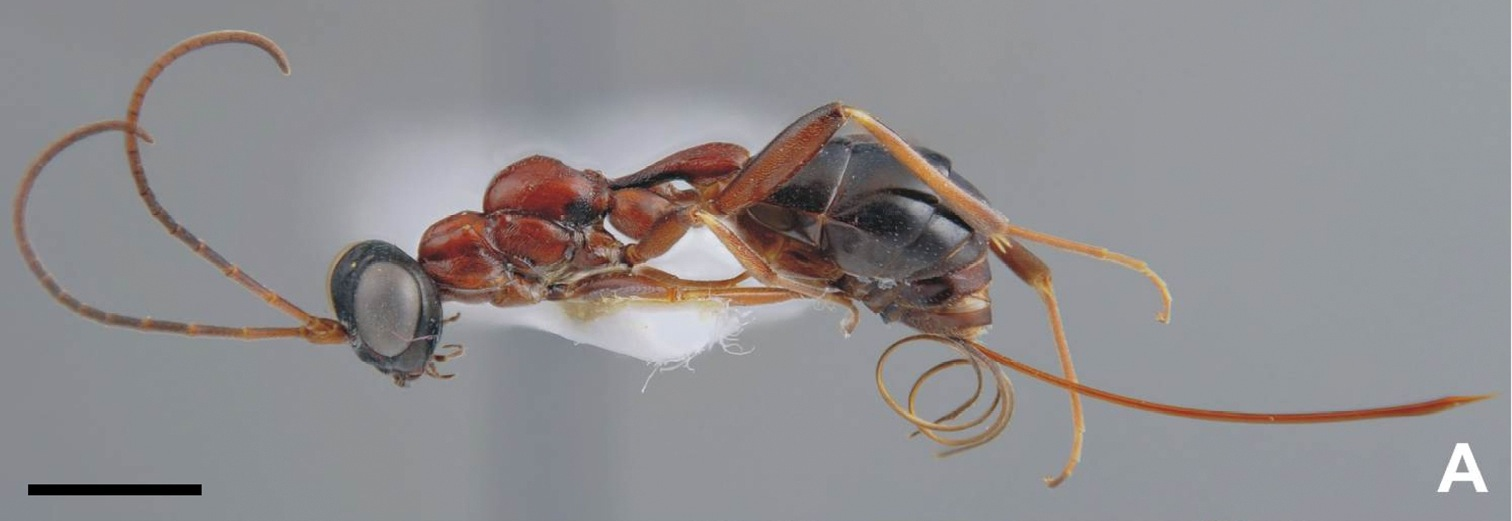
Species of parasitoid wasps known to parasitize Zodarion styliferum. The first image shows a female Calymmochilus dispar while the second is a female Gelis apterus. Both images are in the material view, both scales bars is 1 mm.

Parasitism amongst Hymenoptera is common with several groups of Hymenopterians developing parasitic behaviors on spiders. This is especially seen with several wasp groups which parasitize on a wide range of spider species and behaviors from ground-dwelling, fast moving predators such as wolf spiders (Lycosidae) to web-inhabiting spiders such as orb-web weavers (Araneidae).

In the past, records of parasitism for Zodarion styliferum has only been tentatively identified. This was until (Korenko et al. 2013) discovered that two parasitoid species of wasps have been associated with Zodarion styliferum. It is now known that this species currently has two species of parasitoid wasps associated with this species, they are Calymmochilus dispar and Gelis apterus. There seems to be little information known about the biology and host associations of wasps of the genus Calymmochilus. The larvae of Calymmochilus dispar do not create their own cocoon during pupation. Instead C. dispar will rather use the spider igloo already built by Zodarion styliferum to help protect their exposed larvae from environmental conditions and potential predators. Females of the species Gelis apterus will attack female spiders while in their spider igloos using their long ovipositors to penetrate the igloo. Once inside, larvae will make their cocoons before pupation.
