= Zodarion scutatum =

Scientific classification
- Kingdom: Animalia
- Phylum: Arthropoda
- Subphylum: Chelicerata
- Class: Arachnida
- Order: Araneae
- Infraorder: Araneomorphae
- Family: Zodariidae
- Genus: Zodarion
- Species: Z. scutatum

Binomial name
- Zodarion scutatum Wunderlich, 1980

Species of ant spider

Zodarion scutatum is a species of ant spider in the genus Zodarion that lives in Europe. It was first seen in Slovenia and has been subsequently found in many other countries, including Croatia, Kosovo, Montenegro and Serbia. The spider is small, typically 3.6 mm (0.14 in) long. It has an orange-brown carapace with dark brown eye field and a light yellow sternum. Its opisthosoma is violet to dark brown on top and mainly yellow underneath. It has a distinctive scutum. Its legs are yellow-brown. Its copulatory organs distinguish it from related spiders, particularly the triangular appendage on the spike in the middle of the male's palpal bulb, or median apophysis and the deep indentation in the middle of the female's epigyne.

== Taxonomy ==
Zodarion scutatum is a species of ant spider, a member of the family Zodariidae, that was first described by Jörg Wunderlich in 1980. He allocated it to the genus Zodarion, which had been circumscribed by Charles Walckenaer in 1826. The genus is a member of the family Zodariidae, first described by Tamerlan Thorell in 1881. RAD sequencing has demonstrated that it is one of the oldest of the extant spider genera, dating to the Cretaceous–Paleogene boundary. It is divided into groups based on the design of the copulatory organs. Zodarion is a member of the aculeatum group, along with Zodarion aculeatum and Zodarion sardum.

== Description ==
The spider is small and has typical total length of 3.6 mm (0.14 in). Its prosoma has a typical length of 1.8 mm (0.071 in) and width of 1.4 mm (0.055 in). its carapace, the upper side of its prosoma, is orange-brown with a dark brown eye field. The sternum, or underside of the prosoma, is light yellow and edged in dark brown. There is a single tooth in the spider's chelicerae. The top of its ovate opisthosoma is violet to dark brown with a shiny lustre. It has a distinctive hard layer or scutum. The underside is mainly yellow with dark areas in front of the spinnerets. The spinnerets themselves are yellow. Its legs are yellow-brown and hairy.

The spider's copulatory organs distinguish it from other members of the genus. The male has a gland at the base of its cymbium and a spike in the middle of the palpal bulb, or median apophysis, that has a smaller spike emanating from an elongated lower section and larger triangular appendage towards the front. The spider's embolus does not extend far from the palpal bulb and finishes with a blunted tip. The female has a deep narrow indentation in the middle of its epigyne, the external visible part of its copulatory organs. The two copulatory openings lead to widely-separated spermathecae, or receptacles.

== Behaviour ==
Zodarion spiders are known to mimic ants for both defensive purposes and to surprise prey. This has led to their common name, ant spiders. The spiders will hunt on ant trails and other places frequented by prey. In three-quarters of observed encounters with ants, the spiders were successful in their deception, and even when not, would frequently attempt to distract their prey and attack from behind.

== Distribution ==
The majority of Zodarion species live in Southern Europe. Zodarion scutatum often lives in mountainous areas. The holotype was discovered on Slavik in Slovenia in 1977. In Croatia, it is found in Bakar. The first example to be seen in Montenegro was discovered on Durmitor living at an altitude of 855 m (2,805 ft) above sea level. It has also been found in Kosovo and Serbia. The spider has been seen living near Preševo at an altitude of 690 m (2,260 ft) and in Germia Park near Pristina at an altitude of 825 m (2,707 ft).
