= Zodarion ohridense =

Scientific classification
- Kingdom: Animalia
- Phylum: Arthropoda
- Subphylum: Chelicerata
- Class: Arachnida
- Order: Araneae
- Infraorder: Araneomorphae
- Family: Zodariidae
- Genus: Zodarion
- Species: Z. ohridense

Binomial name
- Zodarion ohridense Wunderlich, 1973

Species of spider

Zodarion ohridense is a species of ant spider first seen North Macedonia and subsequently found in Albania, Bulgaria, Croatia, the Czech Republic, Greece and Kosovo. The spider lives in mountainous forests and meadows, including the Osogovo mountains, in altitudes up to 2,824 m (9,265 ft) above sea level. It measures between 2.5 and 45 mm (0.098 and 1.772 in) in total length, the female being larger than the male and has a reddish-brown carapace, a dark brown sternum, and an opisthosoma that is blackish-brown on top and yellow underneath. It can be distinguished from other members of the genus by its copulatory organs. The male has a apophysis in the middle of its palpal bulb that looks like it has two teeth. The female has a distinctive triangular structure on its epigyne.

== Taxonomy ==
Zodarion ohridense is a species of ant spider, a member of the family Zodariidae, that was first described by Jörg Wunderlich in 1973. He allocated it to the genus Zodarion, which had been circumscribed by Charles Walckenaer in 1826. The genus is a member of the family Zodariidae, first described by Tamerlan Thorell in 1881. RAD sequencing has demonstrated that it is one of the oldest of the extant spider genera, dating to the Cretaceous–Paleogene boundary. It is divided into groups based on the design of the copulatory organs. Zodarion is a member of the spinibarbe group, along with Zodarion spinibarbe and ten other species. Phylogenetic classification has shown that it is particularly related to Zodarion graecum.

== Description ==
Zodarion ohridense is externally very similar to other members of the genus. The male spider has typical total length of between 2.5 and 3.2 mm (0.098 and 0.126 in). Its prosoma is between 1.24 and 1.56 mm (0.049 and 0.061 in) long and between 0.92 and 1.1 mm (0.036 and 0.043 in) wide. Its carapace, the upper side of its prosoma, is reddish-brown with darker edges and a darker fovea. There is a notch at the back. The sternum, or underside of the prosoma, is dark brown. The top of its opisthosoma is black-brown with a light spot above the spinnerets. The underside is yellow with a dark brown adrea under the spinnerets. Its legs are yellow-brown, brown and dark brown. The spider's copulatory organs distinguish it from other members of the genus. The male has short apophysis, or spike, that projects from the palpal tibia and another that has what looks like two teeth attached to the middle of the palpal bulb. This median apophysis helps identify the species. The spider's embolus is rather straight with a kink at the end.

The spider shows a degree of sexual dimorphism. The female is larger than the male, with a total length between 3.4 and 4.5 mm (0.13 and 0.18 in). Its prosoma, which is between 1.4 and 1.76 mm (0.055 and 0.069 in) long and between 0.96 and 1.32 mm (0.038 and 0.052 in) wide, is similarly reddish-brown. The female's opisthosoma is similar to the male but has less of a texture. It is distinguished from related species by its epigyne, the external visible part of its copulatory organs, which has two structures that form a triangular shape and a hood in the middle. The two copulatory openings lead to widely-separated rounded spermathecae, or receptacles.

== Distribution and habitat ==
The majority of Zodarion species live in Southern Europe. The holotype for Zodarion ohridense was discovered near Lake Ohrid in North Macedonia. It was subsequently seen in Bulgaria, living on the Osogovo mountains and other mountainous areas. The spider was first seen in Croatia in 1916, although the evidence of the find was published in 2015. The spider is also known from Albania and Kosovo. It has also been seen in Croatia, Greece and the Czech Republic.

The holotype was discovered living under rocks found on a south-facing, brightly sunlit slope. It has subsequently been seen at high altitudes in mountainous areas, both living in forests of Austrian oak, common beech, European pine, and maple trees and living on mountain meadows that can be at altitudes of between 1,400 and 1,900 m (4,600 and 6,200 ft) above sea level in the mountains of Macedonia. The spider has been seen living at even highs altitude, as high as 2,824 m (9,265 ft) above sea level, in Kosovo.
