= Asaracus =

Scientific classification
- Kingdom: Animalia
- Phylum: Arthropoda
- Subphylum: Chelicerata
- Class: Arachnida
- Order: Araneae
- Infraorder: Araneomorphae
- Family: Salticidae
- Subfamily: Salticinae
- Genus: Asaracus; C. L. Koch, 1846

Type species
- A. megacephalus C. L. Koch, 1846

Species
- 5, see text

Genus of spiders

Asaracus is a genus of South American jumping spiders that was first described by Carl Ludwig Koch in 1846.

== Species ==
As of June 2019 it contains five species, found only in Venezuela, Guyana, and Brazil:

- Asaracus megacephalus C. L. Koch, 1846 (type) – Brazil
- Asaracus modestissimus (Caporiacco, 1947) – Guyana
- Asaracus rufociliatus (Simon, 1902) – Brazil, Guyana
- Asaracus semifimbriatus (Simon, 1902) – Brazil
- Asaracus venezuelicus (Caporiacco, 1955) – Venezuela
