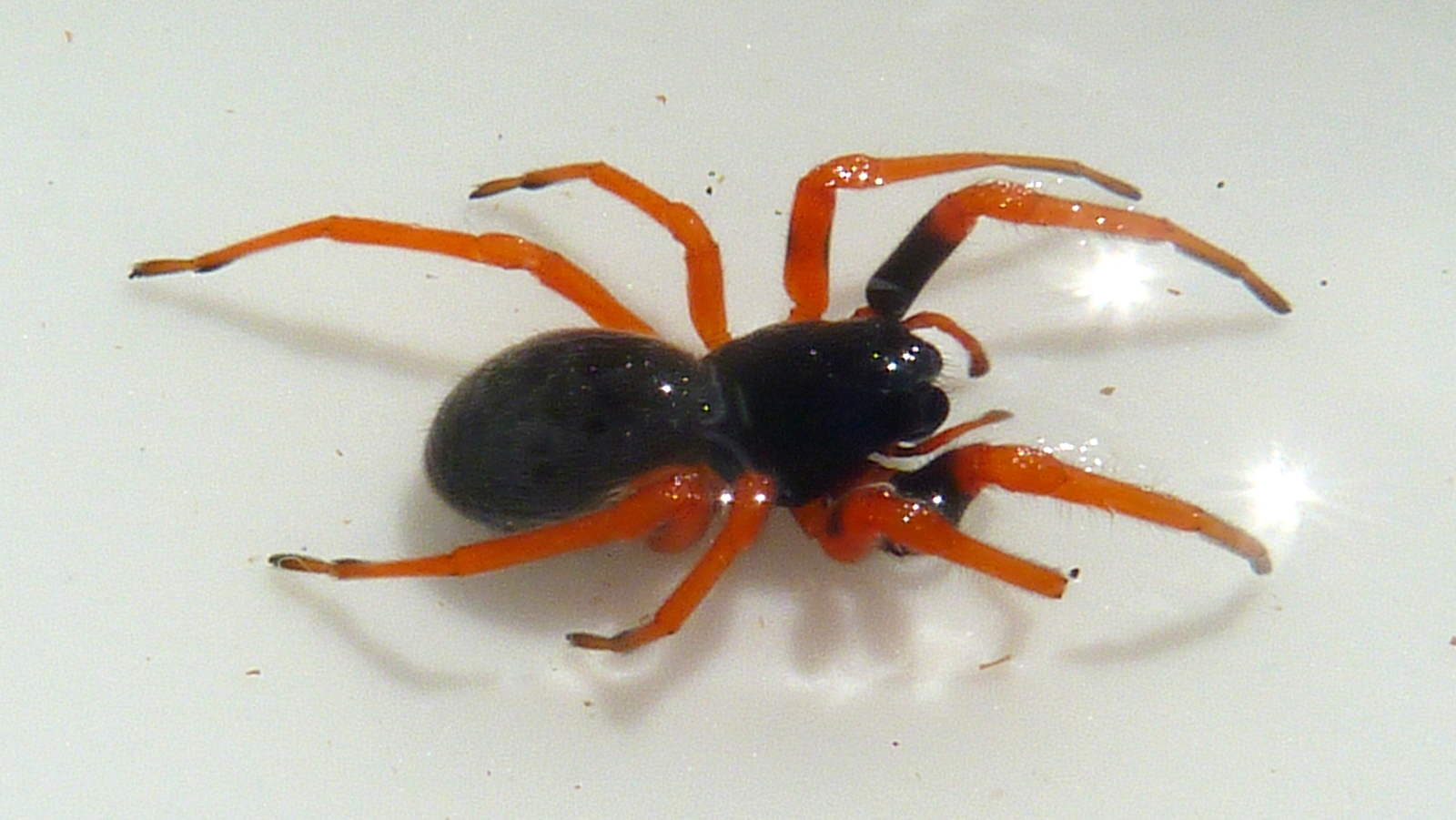
- T. gracilis, female

Scientific classification
- Kingdom: Animalia
- Phylum: Arthropoda
- Subphylum: Chelicerata
- Class: Arachnida
- Order: Araneae
- Infraorder: Araneomorphae
- Family: Trachelidae
- Genus: Trachelopachys; Simon, 1897

Type species
- T. sericeus (Simon, 1886)

Species
- 15, see text

Synonyms
- Tetratrachelas Caporiacco, 1955

= Trachelopachys =

Genus of spiders

Trachelopachys is a genus of South American araneomorph spiders first described by Eugène Simon in 1897. Originally placed with the Corinnidae, it was moved to the Trachelidae in 2014.

== Description ==
Spiders in this genus have a characteristically dark, often jet black, carapace. The legs are reddish, and typically have dark annulations. As with most trachelids, species of Trachelopachys have no leg spines, however they do bear rows of short, thick, black cuspules on the distal segments of the front two pairs of legs.

== Species ==
As of April 2019 it contains fifteen species throughout South America:

- Trachelopachys aemulatus Gertsch, 1942 – Paraguay
- Trachelopachys ammobates Platnick & Rocha, 1995 – Brazil
- Trachelopachys bicolor Chamberlin, 1916 – Peru, Bolivia
- Trachelopachys bidentatus Tullgren, 1905 – Bolivia
- Trachelopachys caviunae (Mello-Leitão, 1947) – Brazil
- Trachelopachys cingulipes (Simon, 1886) – Argentina
- Trachelopachys gracilis (Keyserling, 1891) – Brazil
- Trachelopachys ignacio Platnick, 1975 – Paraguay
- Trachelopachys keyserlingi (Roewer, 1951) – Brazil, Paraguay, Argentina
- Trachelopachys machupicchu Platnick, 1975 – Peru
- Trachelopachys magdalena Platnick, 1975 – Colombia
- Trachelopachys quadriocellatus (Mello-Leitão, 1939) – Bolivia, Paraguay, Argentina
- Trachelopachys sericeus (Simon, 1886) (type) – Brazil, Paraguay, Argentina, Chile
- Trachelopachys singularis (Caporiacco, 1955) – Venezuela
- Trachelopachys tarma Platnick, 1975 – Peru
