= Halorates =

Scientific classification
- Kingdom: Animalia
- Phylum: Arthropoda
- Subphylum: Chelicerata
- Class: Arachnida
- Order: Araneae
- Infraorder: Araneomorphae
- Family: Linyphiidae
- Genus: Halorates; Hull, 1911

Type species
- H. reprobus (O. Pickard-Cambridge, 1879)

Species
- 5, see text

Genus of spiders

Halorates is a genus of dwarf spiders that was first described by J. E. Hull in 1911.

== Species ==
As of May 2021 it contains five species, found in China, Kazakhstan, Nepal and Pakistan:

- Halorates altaicus Tanasevitch, 2013 – Kazakhstan
- Halorates concavus Tanasevitch, 2011 – Pakistan
- Halorates crassipalpis (Caporiacco, 1935) – Pakistan, Nepal
- Halorates reprobus (O. Pickard-Cambridge, 1879) (type) – Western, Central and Northern Europe
- Halorates sexastriatus Fei, Gao & Chen, 1997 – China
