= Schaenicoscelis =

Scientific classification
- Kingdom: Animalia
- Phylum: Arthropoda
- Subphylum: Chelicerata
- Class: Arachnida
- Order: Araneae
- Infraorder: Araneomorphae
- Family: Oxyopidae
- Genus: Schaenicoscelis; Simon, 1898

Type species
- S. elegans Simon, 1898

Species
- 7, see text

Genus of spiders

Schaenicoscelis is a genus of South American lynx spiders that was first described by Eugène Louis Simon in 1898.

== Species ==
As of June 2019 it contains seven species, found only in Guyana and Brazil:

- Schaenicoscelis concolor Simon, 1898 – Brazil
- Schaenicoscelis elegans Simon, 1898 (type) – Brazil
- Schaenicoscelis exilis Mello-Leitão, 1930 – Brazil
- Schaenicoscelis guianensis Caporiacco, 1947 – Guyana
- Schaenicoscelis leucochlora Mello-Leitão, 1929 – Brazil
- Schaenicoscelis luteola Mello-Leitão, 1929 – Brazil
- Schaenicoscelis viridis Mello-Leitão, 1927 – Brazil
