= Vatovia =

Scientific classification
- Kingdom: Animalia
- Phylum: Arthropoda
- Subphylum: Chelicerata
- Class: Arachnida
- Order: Araneae
- Infraorder: Araneomorphae
- Family: Salticidae
- Subfamily: incertae sedis
- Genus: Vatovia; Caporiacco, 1940
- Species: V. albosignata

Binomial name
- Vatovia albosignata Caporiacco, 1940

Genus of spiders

Vatovia is a monotypic genus of Ethiopian jumping spiders containing the single species, Vatovia albosignata. It was first described by Lodovico di Caporiacco in 1940, and is found in Ethiopia. Its taxonomic relationships within the family Salticidae are uncertain.
