= Alioranus =

Scientific classification
- Kingdom: Animalia
- Phylum: Arthropoda
- Subphylum: Chelicerata
- Class: Arachnida
- Order: Araneae
- Infraorder: Araneomorphae
- Family: Linyphiidae
- Genus: Alioranus; Simon, 1926

Type species
- A. pauper (Simon, 1881)

Species
- 6, see text

Synonyms
- Hubertinus Wunderlich, 1980

Genus of spiders

Alioranus is a genus of dwarf spiders that was first described by Eugène Louis Simon in 1926.

== Species ==
As of May 2019 it contains six species:

- Alioranus chiardolae (Caporiacco, 1935) – Turkmenistan to China, Karakorum
- Alioranus diclivitalis Tanasevitch, 1990 – Caucasus (Russia, Azerbaijan)
- Alioranus distinctus Caporiacco, 1935 – Karakorum
- Alioranus minutissimus Caporiacco, 1935 – Karakorum
- Alioranus pastoralis (O. Pickard-Cambridge, 1872) – Greece, Turkey, Israel, Jordan, Tajikistan
- Alioranus pauper (Simon, 1881) (type) – Mediterranean
