= Dolichoneon =

Scientific classification
- Kingdom: Animalia
- Phylum: Arthropoda
- Subphylum: Chelicerata
- Class: Arachnida
- Order: Araneae
- Infraorder: Araneomorphae
- Family: Salticidae
- Subfamily: incertae sedis
- Genus: Dolichoneon; Caporiacco, 1935
- Species: D. typicus

Binomial name
- Dolichoneon typicus Caporiacco, 1935

Genus of spiders

Dolichoneon is a monotypic genus of jumping spiders containing the single species, Dolichoneon typicus. It was first described by Lodovico di Caporiacco in 1935, and is only found in Karakorum. Its taxonomic relationships within the family Salticidae are uncertain.
