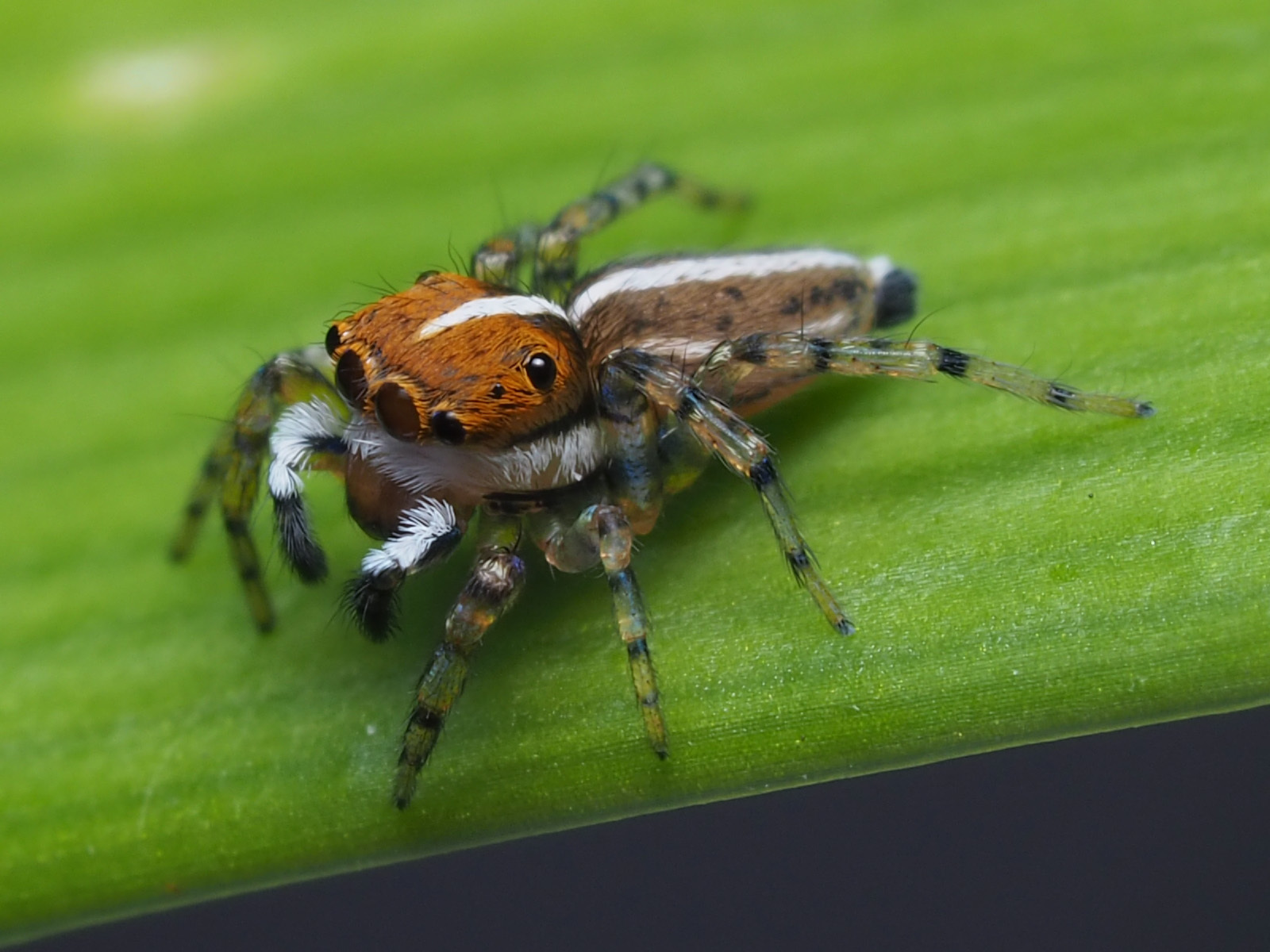
- Female Maeota sp. in Puyo, Ecuador

Scientific classification
- Kingdom: Animalia
- Phylum: Arthropoda
- Subphylum: Chelicerata
- Class: Arachnida
- Order: Araneae
- Infraorder: Araneomorphae
- Family: Salticidae
- Subfamily: Salticinae
- Genus: Maeota; Simon, 1901

Type species
- Maeota dichrura Simon, 1901

Species
- See text.

= Maeota =

Genus of spiders

Maeota is a spider genus of the jumping spider family, Salticidae.

== Species ==
As of June 2017, the World Spider Catalog lists the following species in the genus:

- Maeota betancuri Galvis, 2015 – Colombia
- Maeota dichrura Simon, 1901 – Brazil
- Maeota dorsalis Zhang & Maddison, 2012 – Brazil
- Maeota flava Zhang & Maddison, 2012 – Brazil
- Maeota glauca Galvis, 2015 – Colombia
- Maeota ibargueni Galvis, 2014 – Colombia
- Maeota serrapophysis (Chamberlin & Ivie, 1936) – Panama
- Maeota setastrobilaris Garcilazo-Cruz & Álvarez-Padilla, 2015 – Mexico
- Maeota tuberculotibiata (Caporiacco, 1955) – Venezuela
