= Asthenargellus =

Scientific classification
- Kingdom: Animalia
- Phylum: Arthropoda
- Subphylum: Chelicerata
- Class: Arachnida
- Order: Araneae
- Infraorder: Araneomorphae
- Family: Linyphiidae
- Genus: Asthenargellus; Caporiacco, 1949

Type species
- A. kastoni Caporiacco, 1949

Species
- A. kastoni Caporiacco, 1949 – Kenya; A. meneghettii Caporiacco, 1949 – Kenya

Genus of spiders

Asthenargellus is a genus of East African dwarf spiders that was first described by Lodovico di Caporiacco in 1949. As of May 2019 it contains only two species, both found in Kenya: A. kastoni and A. meneghettii.
