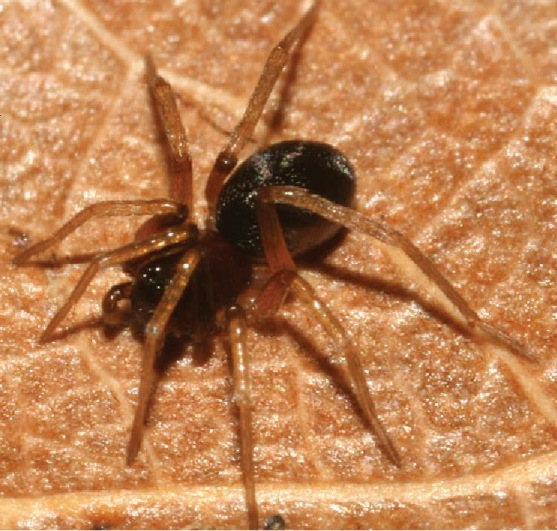
- A juvenile Zodarion styliferum

Scientific classification
- Domain: Eukaryota
- Kingdom: Animalia
- Phylum: Arthropoda
- Subphylum: Chelicerata
- Class: Arachnida
- Order: Araneae
- Infraorder: Araneomorphae
- Family: Zodariidae
- Genus: Zodarion; Walckenaer, 1826

Species
- See text

Diversity
- 169 species

= Zodarion =

Genus of spiders

Zodarion is a genus of ant-eating spiders from the family Zodariidae. 169 species from Eurasia, North Africa and North America have been described as of November 2022.

== Species ==
As of November 2022, the World Spider Catalog accepted the following species:

- Zodarion abantense Wunderlich, 1980 – Turkey, Georgia, Russia
- Zodarion abnorme Denis, 1952 – Morocco
- Zodarion aculeatum Chyzer, 1897 – Bulgaria, Romania, Serbia, Macedonia
- Zodarion aerium Simon, 1890 – Yemen
- Zodarion affine (Simon, 1870) – Spain
- Zodarion agricola Bouseksou & Abrous, 2021 – Algeria
- Zodarion alacre (Simon, 1870) – Portugal, Spain
- Zodarion albipatellare Bosmans, 2009 – Crete
- Zodarion alentejanum Pekár & Carvalho, 2011 – Portugal
- Zodarion algarvense Bosmans, 1994 – Portugal
- Zodarion algiricum (Lucas, 1846) – Algeria
- Zodarion andalusiacum Jocqué, 1991 – Portugal, Spain
- Zodarion arabelae Bosmans, 2009 – Greece
- Zodarion arachnaio Bosmans, 2009 – Greece
- Zodarion atlanticum Pekár & Cardoso, 2005 – Portugal, Azores
- Zodarion atriceps (O. Pickard-Cambridge, 1872) – Lebanon
- Zodarion attikaense Wunderlich, 1980 – Greece
- Zodarion aurorae Weiss, 1982 – Romania
- Zodarion azrouense Bosmans & Benhalima, 2020 – Morocco
- Zodarion bacelarae Pekár, 2003 – Portugal
- Zodarion barbarae Bosmans, 2009 – Greece
- Zodarion beroni Komnenov & Chatzaki, 2016 – Greece
- Zodarion berryi Bosmans & Draney, 2018 – USA
- Zodarion beticum Denis, 1957 – Spain
- Zodarion bicoloripes (Denis, 1959) – Algeria
- Zodarion bigaense Bosmans, Özkütük, Varli & Kunt, 2014 – Turkey
- Zodarion blagoevi Bosmans, 2009 – Bulgaria, Greece
- Zodarion bosmansi Pekár & Cardoso, 2005 – Portugal
- Zodarion bozdagensis Coşar, 2021 – Turkey
- Zodarion buettikeri (Ono & Jocqué, 1986) – Saudi Arabia, Iran
- Zodarion caporiaccoi Roewer, 1942 – Italy
- Zodarion caucasicum Dunin & Nenilin, 1987 – Azerbaijan
- Zodarion cesari Pekár, 2011 – Spain, France (Corsica)
- Zodarion christae Bosmans, 2009 – Greece, Turkey
- Zodarion confusum Denis, 1935 – Italy, Turkey
- Zodarion costablancae Bosmans, 1994 – Portugal, Spain
- Zodarion costapratae Pekár, 2011 – Portugal
- Zodarion couseransense Bosmans, 1997 – France
- Zodarion crewsae (Coşar, Danışman & Kunt, 2022) – Turkey
- Zodarion cyrenaicum Denis, 1935 – Libya, Egypt, Israel
- Zodarion danismani Coşar, 2021 – Turkey
- Zodarion deccanensis (Tikader & Malhotra, 1976) – India
- Zodarion deltshevi Bosmans, 2009 – Turkey
- Zodarion diatretum Denis, 1935 – Spain
- Zodarion dispar Denis, 1935 – Algeria
- Zodarion duriense Cardoso, 2003 – Portugal
- Zodarion egens Denis, 1937 – Unknown
- Zodarion elegans (Simon, 1873) – Southern Europe, North Africa
- Zodarion emarginatum (Simon, 1873) – France, Corsica, Malta, Greece
- Zodarion emilijae (Deltshev & Naumova, 2022) – North Macedonia
- Zodarion epirense Brignoli, 1984 – Bulgaria, Greece
- Zodarion ericorum Bosmans, 2020 – Morocco
- Zodarion evvoia Bosmans, 2009 – Greece
- Zodarion expers (O. Pickard-Cambridge, 1876) – Egypt, Israel
- Zodarion fazanicum Denis, 1938 – Libya
- Zodarion frenatum Simon, 1885 – Italy, Bulgaria, Greece, Crete, Corfu, Turkey
- Zodarion fulvonigrum (Simon, 1874) – France
- Zodarion fuscum (Simon, 1870) – Britain, France, Spain, Portugal
- Zodarion gallicum (Simon, 1873) – France, Corsica, Italy, Balkans, Turkey
- Zodarion gaziantepense Danışman & Coşar, 2021 – Turkey
- Zodarion germanicum (C. L. Koch, 1837) – Europe
- Zodarion geshur Levy, 2007 – Israel
- Zodarion gracilitibiale Denis, 1934 – France, Italy
- Zodarion graecum (C. L. Koch, 1843) – Eastern Europe, Lebanon, Israel
- Zodarion granulatum Kulczyński, 1908 – Cyprus, Greece, Turkey, Lebanon, Israel
- Zodarion gregua Bosmans, 1994 – Portugal, Spain
- Zodarion guadianense Cardoso, 2003 – Portugal
- Zodarion hamatum Wiehle, 1964 – Italy, Austria, Slovenia
- Zodarion hauseri Brignoli, 1984 – North Macedonia, Bulgaria, Greece
- Zodarion immaculatum Denis, 1962 – Libya
- Zodarion imroz Dimitrov, 2020 – Bulgaria, Turkey
- Zodarion inderensis (Ponomarev, 2007) – Kazakhstan
- Zodarion isabellinum (Simon, 1870) – Spain, Morocco
- Zodarion italicum (Canestrini, 1868) – Europe
- Zodarion izmirense Danışman & Coşar, 2020 – Turkey
- Zodarion jansseni Bosmans, 2009 – Greece
- Zodarion jeanclaudeledouxi Bosmans & Benhalima, 2020 – Morocco
- Zodarion jozefienae Bosmans, 1994 – Portugal, Spain
- Zodarion judaeorum Levy, 1992 – Israel
- Zodarion kabylianum Denis, 1937 – Algeria
- Zodarion karpathos Bosmans, 2009 – Greece
- Zodarion killini Bosmans, 2009 – Greece
- Zodarion konradi Bosmans, 2009 – Greece
- Zodarion korgei Wunderlich, 1980 – Turkey
- Zodarion kossamos Bosmans, 2009 – Greece
- Zodarion kunti Coşar, Danışman & Yağmur, 2021 – Turkey
- Zodarion luctuosum (O. Pickard-Cambridge, 1872) – Israel
- Zodarion ludibundum Simon, 1914 – Corsica, Sicily, Algeria
- Zodarion lusitanicum Cardoso, 2003 – Portugal, Spain
- Zodarion lutipes (O. Pickard-Cambridge, 1872) – Cyprus, Israel, Lebanon, Jordan
- Zodarion machadoi Denis, 1939 – Portugal, Spain, Azores
- Zodarion maculatum (Simon, 1870) – Portugal, Spain, France, Sicily, Morocco
- Zodarion maghrebense Bosmans & Benhalima, 2020 – Morocco, Algeria
- Zodarion mallorca Bosmans, 1994 – Mallorca
- Zodarion marginiceps Simon, 1914 – Spain, France
- Zodarion merlijni Bosmans, 1994 – Portugal, Spain
- Zodarion mesranense Bouragba & Bosmans, 2012 – Algeria
- Zodarion messiniense Bosmans, 2009 – Greece
- Zodarion minutum Bosmans, 1994 – Spain, Mallorca, Ibiza
- Zodarion modestum (Simon, 1870) – Spain
- Zodarion montesacrense Bosmans, 2019 – Italy
- Zodarion morosoides Bosmans, 2009 – Greece
- Zodarion morosum Denis, 1935 – Macedonia, Bulgaria, Albania, Greece, Turkey, Ukraine, Russia
- Zodarion mostafai Benhalima & Bosmans, 2020 – Morocco
- Zodarion murphyorum Bosmans, 1994 – Spain
- Zodarion musarum Brignoli, 1984 – Greece
- Zodarion nesiotes Denis, 1965 – Canary Is.
- Zodarion nesiotoides Wunderlich, 1992 – Canary Is.
- Zodarion nigriceps (Simon, 1873) – Corsica, Sardinia
- Zodarion nigrifemur Caporiacco, 1948 – Greece
- Zodarion nitidum (Audouin, 1826) (type species) – North Africa, Middle East
- Zodarion noordami Bosmans, 2009 – Greece
- Zodarion odem Levy, 2007 – Israel
- Zodarion ogeri Bosmans & Benhalima, 2020 – Morocco
- Zodarion ohridense Wunderlich, 1973 – Bulgaria, North Macedonia, Croatia, Greece, Czechia
- Zodarion ovatum B. S. Zhang & F. Zhang, 2019 – Italy
- Zodarion ozkutuki Coşar & Danışman, 2021 – Turkey
- Zodarion pacificum Bosmans, 2009 – Croatia, Bosnia
- Zodarion pallidum Denis, 1952 – Morocco
- Zodarion pantaleonii Bosmans & Pantini, 2019 – Italy (Sardinia)
- Zodarion parashi Wunderlich, 2022 – Greece
- Zodarion petrobium Dunin & Zacharjan, 1991 – Azerbaijan, Armenia
- Zodarion pileolonotatum Denis, 1935 – Libya
- Zodarion pirini Drensky, 1921 – Bulgaria, Greece
- Zodarion planum B. S. Zhang & F. Zhang, 2019 – China
- Zodarion pseudoelegans Denis, 1934 – Spain, France, Ibiza
- Zodarion pseudonigriceps Bosmans & Pantini, 2019 – Italy (Sardinia)
- Zodarion pusio Simon, 1914 – France, Italy, Tunisia, Croatia, Bosnia-Hercegovina, Slovenia
- Zodarion pythium Denis, 1935 – Greece
- Zodarion remotum Denis, 1935 – Corsica, Italy
- Zodarion reticulatum Kulczyński, 1908 – Cyprus
- Zodarion robertbosmans Wunderlich, 2017 – Turkey
- Zodarion rubidum Simon, 1914 – Europe (introduced in USA, Canada)
- Zodarion rudyi Bosmans, 1994 – Portugal, Spain
- Zodarion ruffoi Caporiacco, 1951 – France, Italy, Turkey
- Zodarion samos Bosmans, 2009 – Greece
- Zodarion santorini Bosmans, 2009 – Greece
- Zodarion sardum Bosmans, 1997 – Sardinia
- Zodarion scutatum Wunderlich, 1980 – Slovenia, Croatia
- Zodarion segurense Bosmans, 1994 – Spain
- Zodarion sharurensis (Zamani & Marusik, 2022) – Azerbaijan
- Zodarion siirtensis Coşar, 2021 – Turkey
- Zodarion simplex Jocqué, 2011 – United Arab Emirates
- Zodarion soror (Simon, 1873) – Corsica
- Zodarion spinibarbe Wunderlich, 1973 – Crete
- Zodarion styliferum (Simon, 1870) – Portugal, Spain, Madeira
  - Zodarion styliferum extraneum (Denis, 1935) – Portugal
- Zodarion sungar (Jocqué, 1991) – Turkey, Iraq
- Zodarion talyschicum Dunin & Nenilin, 1987 – Azerbaijan, Iran
- Zodarion thoni Nosek, 1905 – Eastern Europe to Azerbaijan
- Zodarion timidum (Simon, 1874) – Spain, France
- Zodarion trianguliferum Denis, 1952 – Morocco
- Zodarion tuber (Wunderlich, 2022) – Portugal
- Zodarion tunetiacum Strand, 1906 – Tunisia
- Zodarion turcicum Wunderlich, 1980 – Bulgaria, Greece, Turkey
- Zodarion turkesi Coşar & Danışman, 2021 – Turkey
- Zodarion valentii Bosmans, Loverre & Addante, 2019 – Morocco, Algeria, Spain, Italy
- Zodarion van Bosmans, 2009 – Turkey
- Zodarion vanimpei Bosmans, 1994 – Spain
- Zodarion vankeerorum Bosmans, 2009 – Greece
- Zodarion varoli Akpınar, 2016 – Turkey
- Zodarion vicinum Denis, 1935 – England, Italy
- Zodarion viduum Denis, 1937 – Portugal
- Zodarion walsinghami Denis, 1937 – Algeria
- Zodarion weissi (Deltshev & Naumova, 2022) – Bulgaria
- Zodarion wesolowskae Bosmans & Benhalima, 2020 – Morocco
- Zodarion yagmuri Coşar & Danışman, 2021 – Turkey
- Zodarion yemenensis Jocqué & van Harten, 2015 – Yemen
- Zodarion zorba Bosmans, 2009 – Greece
