= Zodarion diatretum =

Scientific classification
- Kingdom: Animalia
- Phylum: Arthropoda
- Subphylum: Chelicerata
- Class: Arachnida
- Order: Araneae
- Infraorder: Araneomorphae
- Family: Zodariidae
- Genus: Zodarion
- Species: Z. diatretum

Binomial name
- Zodarion diatretum Denis, 1935

Species of spider

Zodarion diatretum is a spider species found in Spain.
