= Zodarion couseransense =

Scientific classification
- Kingdom: Animalia
- Phylum: Arthropoda
- Subphylum: Chelicerata
- Class: Arachnida
- Order: Araneae
- Infraorder: Araneomorphae
- Family: Zodariidae
- Genus: Zodarion
- Species: Z. couseransense

Binomial name
- Zodarion couseransense Bosmans, 1997

Species of spider

Zodarion couseransense is a species of spider in the family Zodariidae, found in France.
