= Zodarion soror =

Scientific classification
- Kingdom: Animalia
- Phylum: Arthropoda
- Subphylum: Chelicerata
- Class: Arachnida
- Order: Araneae
- Infraorder: Araneomorphae
- Family: Zodariidae
- Genus: Zodarion
- Species: Z. soror

Binomial name
- Zodarion soror (Simon, 1873)

Species of spider

Zodarion soror is a spider species found in Corsica.
