= Schaenicoscelis elegans =

Scientific classification
- Kingdom: Animalia
- Phylum: Arthropoda
- Subphylum: Chelicerata
- Class: Arachnida
- Order: Araneae
- Infraorder: Araneomorphae
- Family: Oxyopidae
- Genus: Schaenicoscelis
- Species: S. elegans

Binomial name
- Schaenicoscelis elegans Simon, 1898

Species of spider

Schaenicoscelis elegans is a species of spiders in the family Oxyopidae. It was first described in 1898 by Simon. It is found in Brazil.
