= Zodarion attikaense =

Scientific classification
- Kingdom: Animalia
- Phylum: Arthropoda
- Subphylum: Chelicerata
- Class: Arachnida
- Order: Araneae
- Infraorder: Araneomorphae
- Family: Zodariidae
- Genus: Zodarion
- Species: Z. attikaense

Binomial name
- Zodarion attikaense Wunderlich, 1980

Species of spider

Zodarion attikaense is a spider species found in Greece.
