= Zodarion thoni =

Scientific classification
- Kingdom: Animalia
- Phylum: Arthropoda
- Subphylum: Chelicerata
- Class: Arachnida
- Order: Araneae
- Infraorder: Araneomorphae
- Family: Zodariidae
- Genus: Zodarion
- Species: Z. thoni

Binomial name
- Zodarion thoni Nosek, 1905

Species of spider

Zodarion thoni is a spider species found in Eastern Europe, Greece, Cyprus, Turkey, Lebanon, Iran, and the Caucasus.
