= Zodarion fuscum =

Scientific classification
- Kingdom: Animalia
- Phylum: Arthropoda
- Subphylum: Chelicerata
- Class: Arachnida
- Order: Araneae
- Infraorder: Araneomorphae
- Family: Zodariidae
- Genus: Zodarion
- Species: Z. fuscum

Binomial name
- Zodarion fuscum (Simon, 1870)

Species of spider

Zodarion fuscum is a species of spider. It was first discovered in Swindon in 1997, and is also found in southern France and northern Spain, and Portugal.
