= Zodarion fulvonigrum =

Scientific classification
- Kingdom: Animalia
- Phylum: Arthropoda
- Subphylum: Chelicerata
- Class: Arachnida
- Order: Araneae
- Infraorder: Araneomorphae
- Family: Zodariidae
- Genus: Zodarion
- Species: Z. fulvonigrum

Binomial name
- Zodarion fulvonigrum (Simon, 1874)

Synonyms
- Enyo fulvo-nigra Simon, 1874

Species of spider

Zodarion fulvonigrum is a spider species endemic to France. It was first described in 1874 by Eugène Simon as Enyo fulvo-nigra. He moved it to the genus Zodarion in 1914.

Simon distinguished males of Zodarion fulvonigrum from other species of Zodarion primarily on the shape of the apophyses of the palp and the palpal bulb. Females were distinguished by their coloration. In particular, their abdomens were purplish-black above with white on the ventral surface. Their legs were fawn, with only the front femurs darkened.
