= Zodarion modestum =

Scientific classification
- Kingdom: Animalia
- Phylum: Arthropoda
- Subphylum: Chelicerata
- Class: Arachnida
- Order: Araneae
- Infraorder: Araneomorphae
- Family: Zodariidae
- Genus: Zodarion
- Species: Z. modestum

Binomial name
- Zodarion modestum (Simon, 1870)

Species of spider

Zodarion modestum is a spider species found in Spain and Gibraltar.
