= Zodarion machadoi =

Scientific classification
- Kingdom: Animalia
- Phylum: Arthropoda
- Subphylum: Chelicerata
- Class: Arachnida
- Order: Araneae
- Infraorder: Araneomorphae
- Family: Zodariidae
- Genus: Zodarion
- Species: Z. machadoi

Binomial name
- Zodarion machadoi Denis, 1939

Species of spider

Zodarion machadoi is an ant spider species found in Spain, mainland Portugal and the Azores islands.
