= Zodarion pusio =

Scientific classification
- Kingdom: Animalia
- Phylum: Arthropoda
- Subphylum: Chelicerata
- Class: Arachnida
- Order: Araneae
- Infraorder: Araneomorphae
- Family: Zodariidae
- Genus: Zodarion
- Species: Z. pusio

Binomial name
- Zodarion pusio Simon, 1914

Species of spider

Zodarion pusio is a spider species found in France, Italy, Slovenia, Croatia, Bosnia and Herzegovina, Algeria, and Tunisia.
