= Zodarion guadianense =

Scientific classification
- Kingdom: Animalia
- Phylum: Arthropoda
- Subphylum: Chelicerata
- Class: Arachnida
- Order: Araneae
- Infraorder: Araneomorphae
- Family: Zodariidae
- Genus: Zodarion
- Species: Z. guadianense

Binomial name
- Zodarion guadianense Cardoso, 2003

Species of spider

Zodarion guadianense is a spider species found in Portugal.
