= Zodarion turcicum =

Scientific classification
- Kingdom: Animalia
- Phylum: Arthropoda
- Subphylum: Chelicerata
- Class: Arachnida
- Order: Araneae
- Infraorder: Araneomorphae
- Family: Zodariidae
- Genus: Zodarion
- Species: Z. turcicum

Binomial name
- Zodarion turcicum Wunderlich, 1980

Species of spider

Zodarion turcicum is a spider species found in Bulgaria, Turkey, and Greece.
