= Zodarion marginiceps =

Scientific classification
- Kingdom: Animalia
- Phylum: Arthropoda
- Subphylum: Chelicerata
- Class: Arachnida
- Order: Araneae
- Infraorder: Araneomorphae
- Family: Zodariidae
- Genus: Zodarion
- Species: Z. marginiceps

Binomial name
- Zodarion marginiceps Simon, 1914

Species of spider

Zodarion marginiceps is a spider species found in Spain and France.
