= Zodarion elegans =

Scientific classification
- Kingdom: Animalia
- Phylum: Arthropoda
- Subphylum: Chelicerata
- Class: Arachnida
- Order: Araneae
- Infraorder: Araneomorphae
- Family: Zodariidae
- Genus: Zodarion
- Species: Z. elegans

Binomial name
- Zodarion elegans (Simon, 1873)

Species of spider

Zodarion elegans is a spider species found in Southern Europe and North Africa.
