= Zodarion pacificum =

Scientific classification
- Kingdom: Animalia
- Phylum: Arthropoda
- Subphylum: Chelicerata
- Class: Arachnida
- Order: Araneae
- Infraorder: Araneomorphae
- Family: Zodariidae
- Genus: Zodarion
- Species: Z. pacificum

Binomial name
- Zodarion pacificum Bosmans, 2009

Species of spider

Zodarion pacificum is a spider species found in Croatia and Bosnia.
