= Zodarion remotum =

Scientific classification
- Kingdom: Animalia
- Phylum: Arthropoda
- Subphylum: Chelicerata
- Class: Arachnida
- Order: Araneae
- Infraorder: Araneomorphae
- Family: Zodariidae
- Genus: Zodarion
- Species: Z. remotum

Binomial name
- Zodarion remotum Denis, 1935

Species of spider

Zodarion remotum is a spider species found in France (Corsica) and Italy.
