= Zodarion beticum =

Scientific classification
- Kingdom: Animalia
- Phylum: Arthropoda
- Subphylum: Chelicerata
- Class: Arachnida
- Order: Araneae
- Infraorder: Araneomorphae
- Family: Zodariidae
- Genus: Zodarion
- Species: Z. beticum

Binomial name
- Zodarion beticum Denis, 1957

Species of spider

Zodarion beticum is a spider species found in Spain.
