= Zodarion granulatum =

Scientific classification
- Kingdom: Animalia
- Phylum: Arthropoda
- Subphylum: Chelicerata
- Class: Arachnida
- Order: Araneae
- Infraorder: Araneomorphae
- Family: Zodariidae
- Genus: Zodarion
- Species: Z. granulatum

Binomial name
- Zodarion granulatum Kulczynski, 1908

Species of spider

Zodarion granulatum is a spider species found in Cyprus, Greece, Turkey, Lebanon, and Israel.

== Description ==
Prosoma female: yellowish-brown, male: densely granulated, dark brown, median, and eye field black. Legs female: yellow, male: yellow-brown. Femur male: brown. Opisthosoma female: uniform purple-brown, laterally with big light brown spots, male: shining black, dorsally granulated, dark purple to light brown laterally and ventrally.

Body length male: 2.5 mm Body length female: 2.3 mm
