= Zodarion italicum =

Scientific classification
- Domain: Eukaryota
- Kingdom: Animalia
- Phylum: Arthropoda
- Subphylum: Chelicerata
- Class: Arachnida
- Order: Araneae
- Infraorder: Araneomorphae
- Family: Zodariidae
- Genus: Zodarion
- Species: Z. italicum

Binomial name
- Zodarion italicum (Canestrini, 1868)
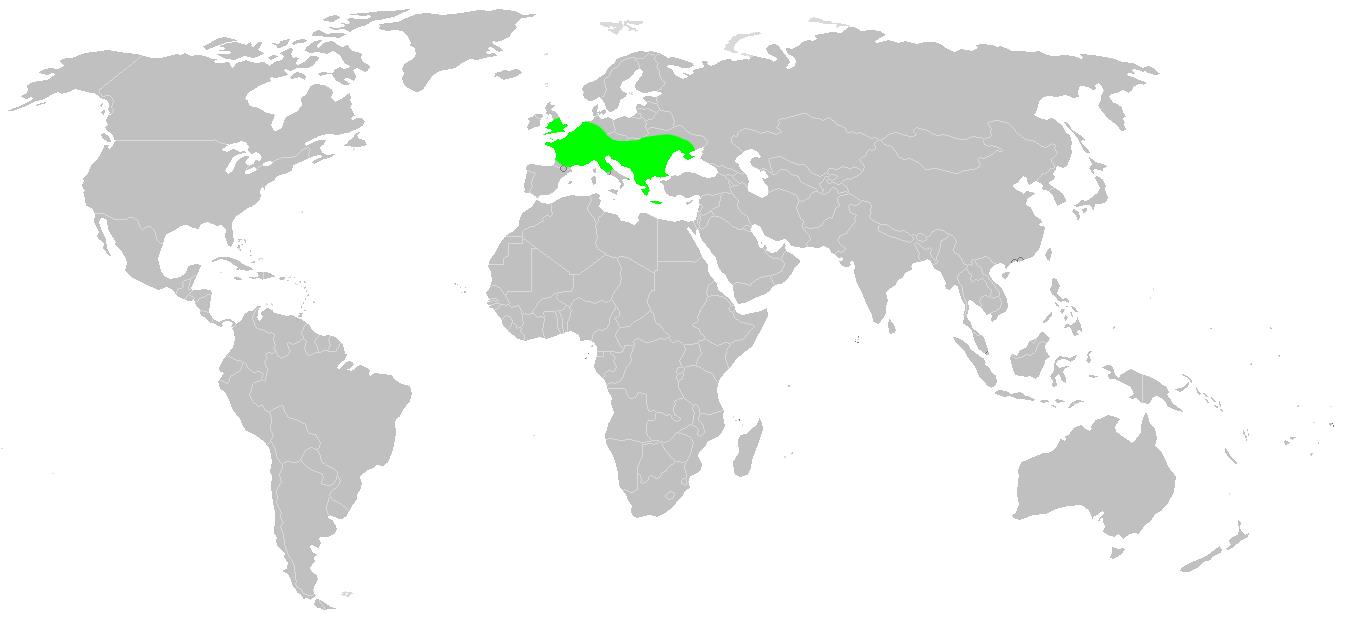

Synonyms
- Enyo italica Canestrini, 1868

Species of spider

Zodarion italicum is a European ant-eating spider in the family Zodariidae. Like the closely related Z. hamatum, it is nocturnal and captures various ant species. Z. italicum seems to be specialized in Formicinae ants. Both species are generalized mimics of orange-dark brown ants, such as Lasius emarginatus. Body length of males is 1.6–2.9 mm (0.1–0.1 in) and of females 2.1–4.3 mm (0.1–0.2 in).

== Distribution ==
It is found in Western, Southwestern, and Eastern Europe, including Caucasus. It was first discovered in Britain in 1984, where it is widespread in the Grays area of Essex and occurs among rubble on waste ground and in chalk quarries, often with the ant Lasius niger.
