= Zodarion reticulatum =

Scientific classification
- Kingdom: Animalia
- Phylum: Arthropoda
- Subphylum: Chelicerata
- Class: Arachnida
- Order: Araneae
- Infraorder: Araneomorphae
- Family: Zodariidae
- Genus: Zodarion
- Species: Z. reticulatum

Binomial name
- Zodarion reticulatum Kulczyński, 1908

Species of spider

Zodarion reticulatum is a spider species found in Greece, Cyprus, and Turkey.
