= Zodarion morosoides =

Scientific classification
- Kingdom: Animalia
- Phylum: Arthropoda
- Subphylum: Chelicerata
- Class: Arachnida
- Order: Araneae
- Infraorder: Araneomorphae
- Family: Zodariidae
- Genus: Zodarion
- Species: Z. morosoides

Binomial name
- Zodarion morosoides Bosmans, 2009

Species of spider

Zodarion morosoides is a spider species found in Greece and Turkey.
