= Zodarion gracilitibiale =

Scientific classification
- Kingdom: Animalia
- Phylum: Arthropoda
- Subphylum: Chelicerata
- Class: Arachnida
- Order: Araneae
- Infraorder: Araneomorphae
- Family: Zodariidae
- Genus: Zodarion
- Species: Z. gracilitibiale

Binomial name
- Zodarion gracilitibiale Denis, 1934

Species of spider

Zodarion gracilitibiale is a spider species found in France and Italy.
