= Zodarion lutipes =

Scientific classification
- Kingdom: Animalia
- Phylum: Arthropoda
- Subphylum: Chelicerata
- Class: Arachnida
- Order: Araneae
- Infraorder: Araneomorphae
- Family: Zodariidae
- Genus: Zodarion
- Species: Z. lutipes

Binomial name
- Zodarion lutipes (O. P.-Cambridge, 1872)

Species of spider

Zodarion lutipes is a spider species found in Cyprus, Lebanon, Palestine, Israel, Jordan, Iraq, and Iran.
