= Zodarion cesari =

Scientific classification
- Kingdom: Animalia
- Phylum: Arthropoda
- Subphylum: Chelicerata
- Class: Arachnida
- Order: Araneae
- Infraorder: Araneomorphae
- Family: Zodariidae
- Genus: Zodarion
- Species: Z. cesari

Binomial name
- Zodarion cesari Pekár, 2011

Species of spider

Zodarion cesari is a spider species found in Spain, France, and Algeria.
