= Zodarion morosum =

Scientific classification
- Kingdom: Animalia
- Phylum: Arthropoda
- Subphylum: Chelicerata
- Class: Arachnida
- Order: Araneae
- Infraorder: Araneomorphae
- Family: Zodariidae
- Genus: Zodarion
- Species: Z. morosum

Binomial name
- Zodarion morosum Denis, 1935

Species of spider

Zodarion morosum is a spider species found in Albania, North Macedonia, Bulgaria, Greece, Romania, Ukraine, Russia, Georgia, Turkey, and Syria.
