= Zodarion emarginatum =

Scientific classification
- Kingdom: Animalia
- Phylum: Arthropoda
- Subphylum: Chelicerata
- Class: Arachnida
- Order: Araneae
- Infraorder: Araneomorphae
- Family: Zodariidae
- Genus: Zodarion
- Species: Z. emarginatum

Binomial name
- Zodarion emarginatum (Simon, 1873)

Species of spider

Zodarion emarginatum is a spider species found in France, Corsica, Malta, Italy, and Greece.
