= Maeota dichrura =

Scientific classification
- Kingdom: Animalia
- Phylum: Arthropoda
- Subphylum: Chelicerata
- Class: Arachnida
- Order: Araneae
- Infraorder: Araneomorphae
- Family: Salticidae
- Genus: Maeota
- Species: M. dichrura

Binomial name
- Maeota dichrura Simon, 1901

Species of spider

Maeota dichrura is a jumping spider species in the genus Maeota that lives in Brazil. It was first described by Eugène Simon in 1901.
