= Zodarion isabellinum =

Scientific classification
- Kingdom: Animalia
- Phylum: Arthropoda
- Subphylum: Chelicerata
- Class: Arachnida
- Order: Araneae
- Infraorder: Araneomorphae
- Family: Zodariidae
- Genus: Zodarion
- Species: Z. isabellinum

Binomial name
- Zodarion isabellinum (Simon, 1870)

Species of spider

Zodarion isabellinum is a spider species found in Portugal, Spain, Italy (Sicily), and Morocco.
