= Zodarion pirini =

Scientific classification
- Kingdom: Animalia
- Phylum: Arthropoda
- Subphylum: Chelicerata
- Class: Arachnida
- Order: Araneae
- Infraorder: Araneomorphae
- Family: Zodariidae
- Genus: Zodarion
- Species: Z. pirini

Binomial name
- Zodarion pirini Drensky, 1921

Species of spider

Zodarion pirini is a spider species found in Bulgaria and Greece.
