= Zodarion lusitanicum =

Scientific classification
- Kingdom: Animalia
- Phylum: Arthropoda
- Subphylum: Chelicerata
- Class: Arachnida
- Order: Araneae
- Infraorder: Araneomorphae
- Family: Zodariidae
- Genus: Zodarion
- Species: Z. lusitanicum

Binomial name
- Zodarion lusitanicum Cardoso, 2003

Species of spider

Zodarion lusitanicum is a spider species found in Portugal and Spain.
