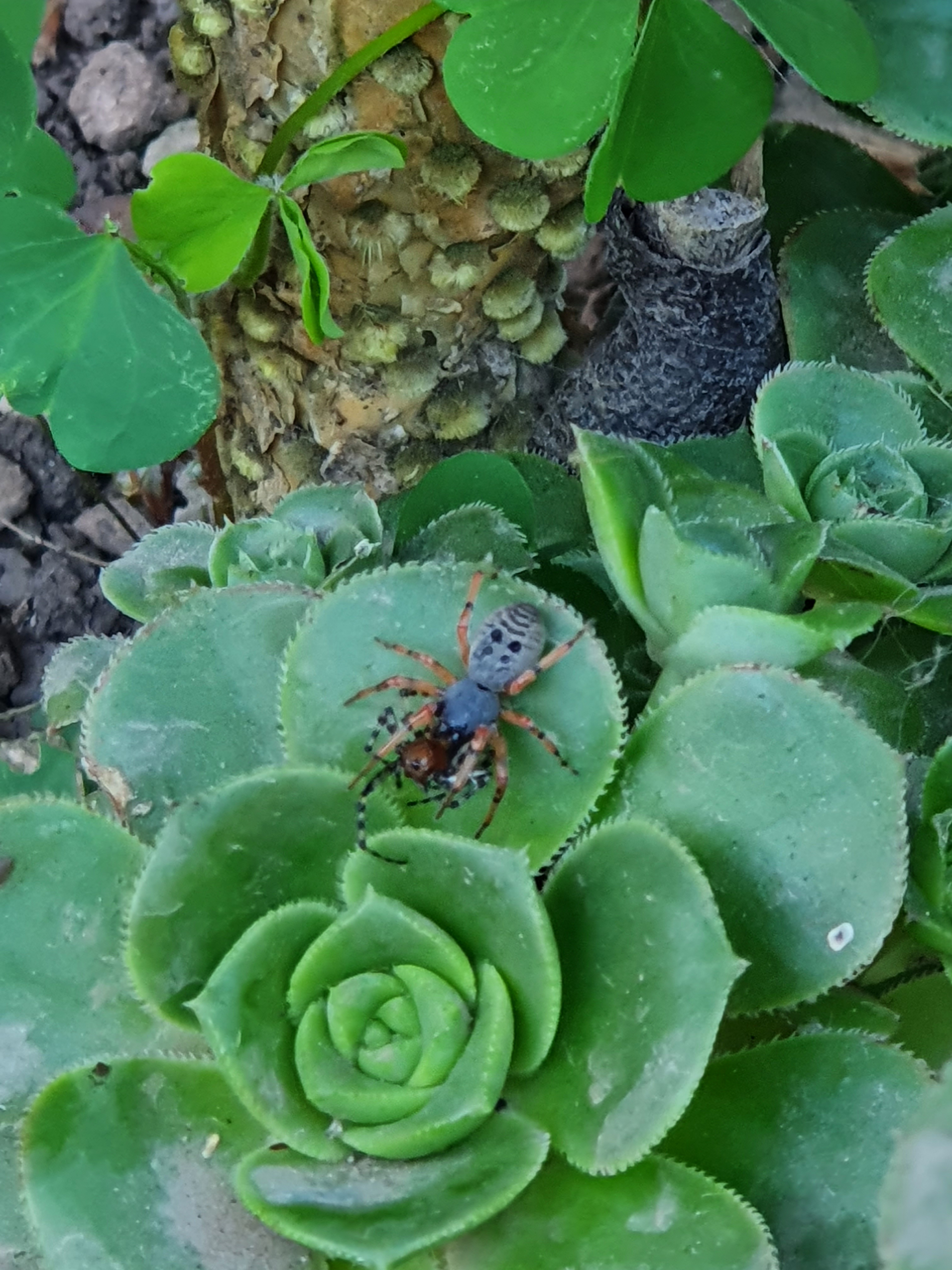
- Eating Alpaida gallardoi

Scientific classification
- Kingdom: Animalia
- Phylum: Arthropoda
- Subphylum: Chelicerata
- Class: Arachnida
- Order: Araneae
- Infraorder: Araneomorphae
- Family: Trachelidae
- Genus: Trachelopachys
- Species: T. cingulipes

Binomial name
- Trachelopachys cingulipes Simon, 1886

= Trachelopachys cingulipes =

Argentine spider

Trachelopachys cingulipes is a species of araneomorph spider from the family Trachelidae. It was first described by French naturalist, Eugène Simon, in 1886.

== Distribution ==
This species is endemic to Argentina, in particular the province of Buenos Aires. It is mostly found in gardens, but it can venture into the walls of houses in search of prey, which includes mostly other small arthropods (such as spiders, small beetles, ants, etc.).

== Description ==
As a hunting spider, it has eight front-facing eyes to help with hunting. Its body measures between 5–6 mm (0.20–0.24 in) and is of a greyish coloration, with four black spots in its abdomen as well as a black "wave" pattern. One of its most distinguishing features is their bright orange legs with black spots.
