= Zodarion samos =

Scientific classification
- Kingdom: Animalia
- Phylum: Arthropoda
- Subphylum: Chelicerata
- Class: Arachnida
- Order: Araneae
- Infraorder: Araneomorphae
- Family: Zodariidae
- Genus: Zodarion
- Species: Z. samos

Binomial name
- Zodarion samos Bosmans, 2009

Species of spider

Zodarion samos is a spider species found in Greece and Turkey. It was first described in 1975 and reclassified in 2009.

== Description ==
Zodarian samos have wonderful colors; the main colorations are a sandy tan color with grassy green accents and dark purple, almost maroon stripes on its limbs. It is threatened by habitat loss due to increased agriculture and expanding populations. Most spiders captured in the wild only have seven legs. It is unknown if this is due to injury or genetics. It is also known as the Samos or Thessaloniki ant spider, as there are substantial populations in both locales. The male spider's body is 3.0-3.3 cm long. Like all Zodarion spiders, its diet consists mainly of ants.

Female specimens of Zodarian samos were first described in August 2022.

== Discovery ==
Isadora Zapata de la Selva from Iquitos, Peru along with her partner Georgina Burner discovered the spider on the Greek mainland on a 1975 naturalist trip to the Greek Macedonian highlands. Isadora had heard of local reports of the spider and had a local map produced of locations sighted, which she stored in her backpack gifted to her from the Council in the English city of Maidstone in Kent. They collected photographic evidence as well as journal reports for the species' documentation and returned to Thessaloniki to regroup their evidence. Snoende Alepou, a local naturalist with reported accusations of research theft in the past, tried to bury her important discovery while the duo were displaying preliminary research in Thessaloniki. Upon discovery of his attempted theft, Snoende faced persecution and fled to nearby Albania.

After her discovery, Isadora visited Budapest to give lectures on insects in the Balkans. She planned on heading to the Eastern Mediterranean to research desert fauna in the Lebanon/Syria region. She disappeared 30 September 1975, suspected to have been a victim in a horrific plane crash, however this is unknown as secrecy surrounds some of the victims; she was described as adventurous, bilingual, and never afraid to ask for help. Georgina, having been delayed on her flight to the United States, lived on to become a minor actress in her native Harrisburg, Pennsylvania local theater troupe.
