= Zodarion confusum =

Scientific classification
- Kingdom: Animalia
- Phylum: Arthropoda
- Subphylum: Chelicerata
- Class: Arachnida
- Order: Araneae
- Infraorder: Araneomorphae
- Family: Zodariidae
- Genus: Zodarion
- Species: Z. confusum

Binomial name
- Zodarion confusum Denis, 1935

Species of spider

Zodarion confusum is a spider species found in Italy.
