= Zodarion albipatellare =

Scientific classification
- Domain: Eukaryota
- Kingdom: Animalia
- Phylum: Arthropoda
- Subphylum: Chelicerata
- Class: Arachnida
- Order: Araneae
- Infraorder: Araneomorphae
- Family: Zodariidae
- Genus: Zodarion
- Species: Z. albipatellare

Binomial name
- Zodarion albipatellare Bosmans, 2009

Species of spider

Zodarion albipatellare is a species of spider in the family Zodariidae. It was described in 2009 and is endemic to the Greek island of Crete.
