= Zodarion vankeerorum =

Scientific classification
- Kingdom: Animalia
- Phylum: Arthropoda
- Subphylum: Chelicerata
- Class: Arachnida
- Order: Araneae
- Infraorder: Araneomorphae
- Family: Zodariidae
- Genus: Zodarion
- Species: Z. vankeerorum

Binomial name
- Zodarion vankeerorum Bosmans, 2009

Species of spider

Zodarion vankeerorum is a spider species found in Greece.
