= Zodarion nigrifemur =

Scientific classification
- Kingdom: Animalia
- Phylum: Arthropoda
- Subphylum: Chelicerata
- Class: Arachnida
- Order: Araneae
- Infraorder: Araneomorphae
- Family: Zodariidae
- Genus: Zodarion
- Species: Z. nigrifemur

Binomial name
- Zodarion nigrifemur Caporiacco, 1948

Species of spider

Zodarion nigrifemur is a spider species found in Greece, Turkey, and Georgia.
