= Zodarion wesolowskae =

Scientific classification
- Kingdom: Animalia
- Phylum: Arthropoda
- Subphylum: Chelicerata
- Class: Arachnida
- Order: Araneae
- Infraorder: Araneomorphae
- Family: Zodariidae
- Genus: Zodarion
- Species: Z. wesolowskae

Binomial name
- Zodarion wesolowskae Bosmans & Benhalima, 2020

Species of spider

Zodarion wesolowskae is a species of ant spider in the genus Zodarion that lives in Morocco. The species was first described in 2020 by Souâd Benhalima and Robert Bosmans. Only the male has been described, although Benhalima and Bosmans suggest that the female could be one of the spiders described as Zodarion trianguliferum. The spider is small, typically 3.4 mm (0.13 in) long, with a plain brown to dark brown carapace and a black abdomen which has faint white stripes. The spider is a member of the mostafai group within the genus, which lack a tooth at the end of the embolus. It can be further distinguished from other members of the genus by its very long and thin tibial apophysis. The genus Zodarion is known to use ant mimicry for both defence against predators and to deceive ants to prey on them. This attribute could be used as a form of biological pest control.

== Taxonomy ==
Zodarion wesolowskae was first described by Souâd Benhalima and Robert Bosmans in 2020. The species is named after the Polish arachnologist Wanda Wesołowska. It was allocated to the genus Zodarion, raised by Charles Walckenaer in 1826. The genus is a member of the family Zodariidae, first described by Tamerlan Thorell in 1881. RAD sequencing has demonstrated that it is one of the oldest of the extant spider genera, dating to the Cretaceous–Paleogene boundary. It is divided into groups based on the design of the copulatory organs. Zodarion wesolowskae is a member of the mostafai group, along with Zodarion trianguliferum and five other species.

== Description ==
Only the male has been described. The spider is small, with a typical total length of 3.4 mm (0.13 in). The carapace has a typical length of 1.83 mm (0.072 in) and width of 1.3 mm (0.051 in). It is dark brown to brown and has no pattern. The abdomen is black and bulbous, similar in size to the carapace. It has a spot towards the back and stripes that are faintly white. The legs are black and white. The palpal bulb has a tibial apophysis that has a distinctive curved, long, and thin part extending away from the body, much longer than other species in the genus, which can be up to four times as long as the rest of the apophysis. It has a pointed end. The embolus is similarly small and curved at the end. The species is distinguished from others in the genus by features of the copulatory organs. The embolus lacks a tooth, similar to other members of the mostafai group, but the very long tibial apophysis is unusual and can help identify the species.

The female has not been described and Souâd Benhalima and Robert Bosmans speculated that one of the examples of Zodarion trianguliferum identified by Jacques Denis could be the possible female of the species. If that is the case, the female is larger, between 4.3 and 4.5 mm (0.17 and 0.18 in) long, and lighter in color.

== Behaviour ==
Zodarion spiders are known to mimic ants for both defensive purposes and to surprise prey. This has led to their common name, ant spiders. The spiders will hunt on ant trails and other places frequented by prey. In three-quarters of observed encounters with ants, the spiders were successful in their deception, and even when not, would frequently attempt to distract their prey and attack from behind. The spiders only prey on ants, and often specific subfamilies of ants. Their success in devouring specific types of ants has led to the proposal to use these spiders as biological pest controls.

== Distribution and habitat ==
The species is endemic to Morocco. It has only been found near the source of the Oum Er-Rbia River in the north of the Khénifra Province. The spider lives amongst stones and grasses. The country has a high concentration of Zodarion species and may be a centre for the type.
