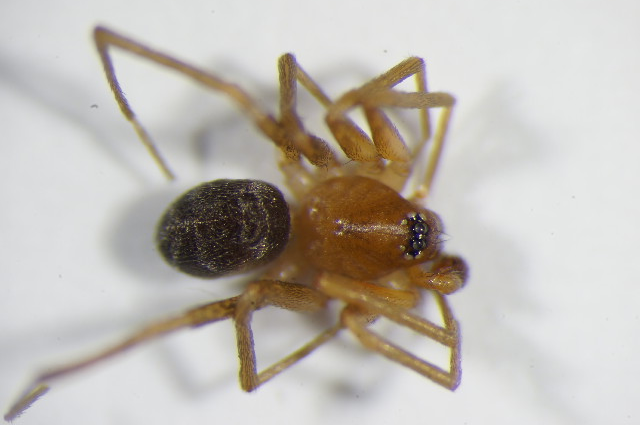
- Z. rubidum, adult male

Scientific classification
- Kingdom: Animalia
- Phylum: Arthropoda
- Subphylum: Chelicerata
- Class: Arachnida
- Order: Araneae
- Infraorder: Araneomorphae
- Family: Zodariidae
- Genus: Zodarion
- Species: Z. rubidum

Binomial name
- Zodarion rubidum Simon, 1914

= Zodarion rubidum =

Species of spider

Zodarion rubidum is a spider species of the family Zodariidae.

Like most Zodariidae, Z. rubidum is an ant-eating spider. It resembles ants structurally and behaviorally. Z. rubidum specifically mimics red ants, such as Myrmica sabuleti. It often feeds on Tetramorium caespitum or Lasius platythorax. There have been studies done where the spider was presented with a dozen ant species and various other insects and it quickly attacked the ants and left the other species of insects alone.

Zodarion rubidum is up to 5mm in size. Like many other zodariid spiders, it moves across open ground in the evening and at night.

== Distribution ==
Zodarion rubidum originally comes from southwestern France, but has since spread into central Europe and has been introduced to the U.S. and Canada.
