= Zodarion maculatum =

Scientific classification
- Kingdom: Animalia
- Phylum: Arthropoda
- Subphylum: Chelicerata
- Class: Arachnida
- Order: Araneae
- Infraorder: Araneomorphae
- Family: Zodariidae
- Genus: Zodarion
- Species: Z. maculatum

Binomial name
- Zodarion maculatum (Simon, 1870)

Species of spider

Zodarion maculatum is a spider species found in Morocco, Algeria, Portugal, Spain, France, and Italy.
