= Zodarion alentejanum =

Scientific classification
- Kingdom: Animalia
- Phylum: Arthropoda
- Subphylum: Chelicerata
- Class: Arachnida
- Order: Araneae
- Infraorder: Araneomorphae
- Family: Zodariidae
- Genus: Zodarion
- Species: Z. alentejanum

Binomial name
- Zodarion alentejanum Pekár & Carvalho, 2011

Species of spider

Zodarion alentejanum is a spider species found in Portugal.
