= Zodarion atlanticum =

Scientific classification
- Kingdom: Animalia
- Phylum: Arthropoda
- Subphylum: Chelicerata
- Class: Arachnida
- Order: Araneae
- Infraorder: Araneomorphae
- Family: Zodariidae
- Genus: Zodarion
- Species: Z. atlanticum

Binomial name
- Zodarion atlanticum Pekár & Cardoso, 2005

Species of spider

Zodarion atlanticum is a species of ant spider found in mainland Portugal and the Azores islands.
