= Zodarion aurorae =

Scientific classification
- Kingdom: Animalia
- Phylum: Arthropoda
- Subphylum: Chelicerata
- Class: Arachnida
- Order: Araneae
- Infraorder: Araneomorphae
- Family: Zodariidae
- Genus: Zodarion
- Species: Z. aurorae

Binomial name
- Zodarion aurorae Weiss, 1982

Species of spider

Zodarion aurorae is a species of ant-eating spiders native to Romania.
