= Zodarion timidum =

Scientific classification
- Kingdom: Animalia
- Phylum: Arthropoda
- Subphylum: Chelicerata
- Class: Arachnida
- Order: Araneae
- Infraorder: Araneomorphae
- Family: Zodariidae
- Genus: Zodarion
- Species: Z. timidum

Binomial name
- Zodarion timidum (Simon, 1874)

Species of spider

Zodarion timidum is a spider species found in Spain and France.
