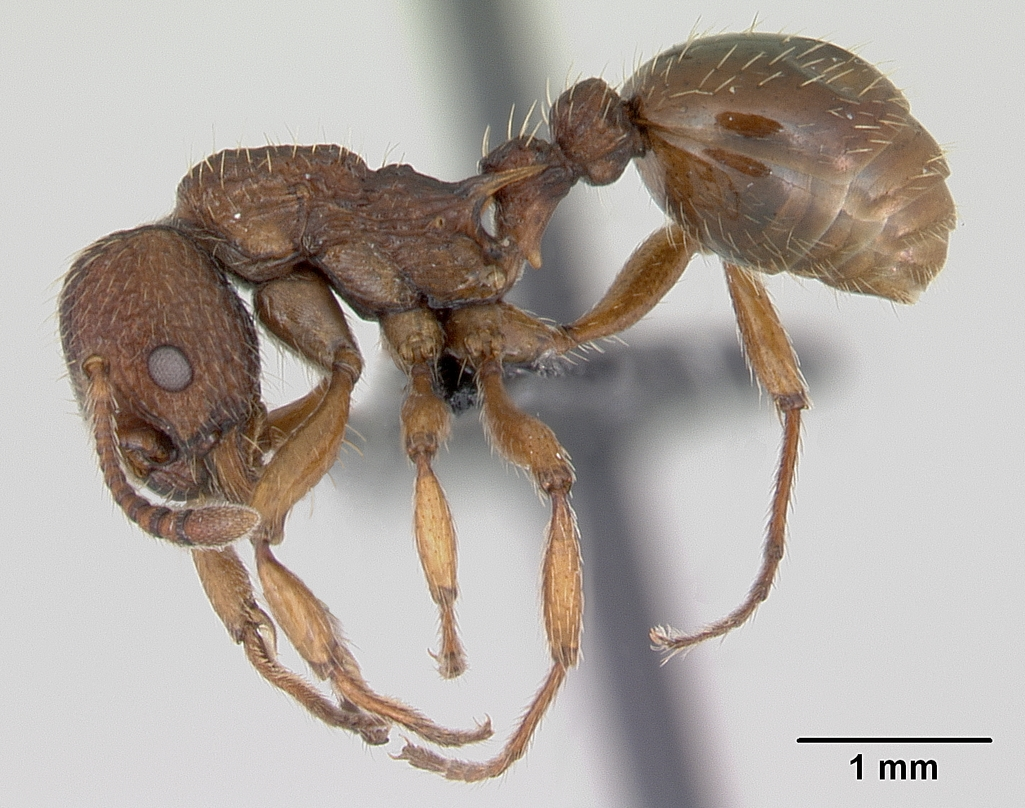

Scientific classification
- Kingdom: Animalia
- Phylum: Arthropoda
- Clade: Pancrustacea
- Class: Insecta
- Order: Hymenoptera
- Family: Formicidae
- Subfamily: Myrmicinae
- Genus: Myrmica
- Species: M. sabuleti

Binomial name
- Myrmica sabuleti Meinert, 1861

= Myrmica sabuleti =

Species of ant

Myrmica sabuleti is a species of ant in the genus Myrmica. The species is indigenous to Europe, and most colonies are polygynous. Caterpillars of the large blue butterfly (Phengaris arion) parasitically prey on this ant. The caterpillar hatches on wild thyme buds and then at the fourth-instar stage tricks the ants into believing it is one of their own larvae by mimicking the specific chemical scents and acoustic sounds of the colony. The worker ants then carry the caterpillar to their nest, where it feeds on the ant grubs for 10 months before pupating and emerging as a butterfly.

== See also ==
- Zodarion rubidum, a spider that mimics and feeds on Myrmica sabuleti
