= Zodarion frenatum =

Scientific classification
- Kingdom: Animalia
- Phylum: Arthropoda
- Subphylum: Chelicerata
- Class: Arachnida
- Order: Araneae
- Infraorder: Araneomorphae
- Family: Zodariidae
- Genus: Zodarion
- Species: Z. frenatum

Binomial name
- Zodarion frenatum Simon, 1885

Species of spider

Zodarion frenatum is a spider species found in Italy, Bulgaria, Greece, Crete, Corfu, Turkey, Albania, and North Macedonia.
