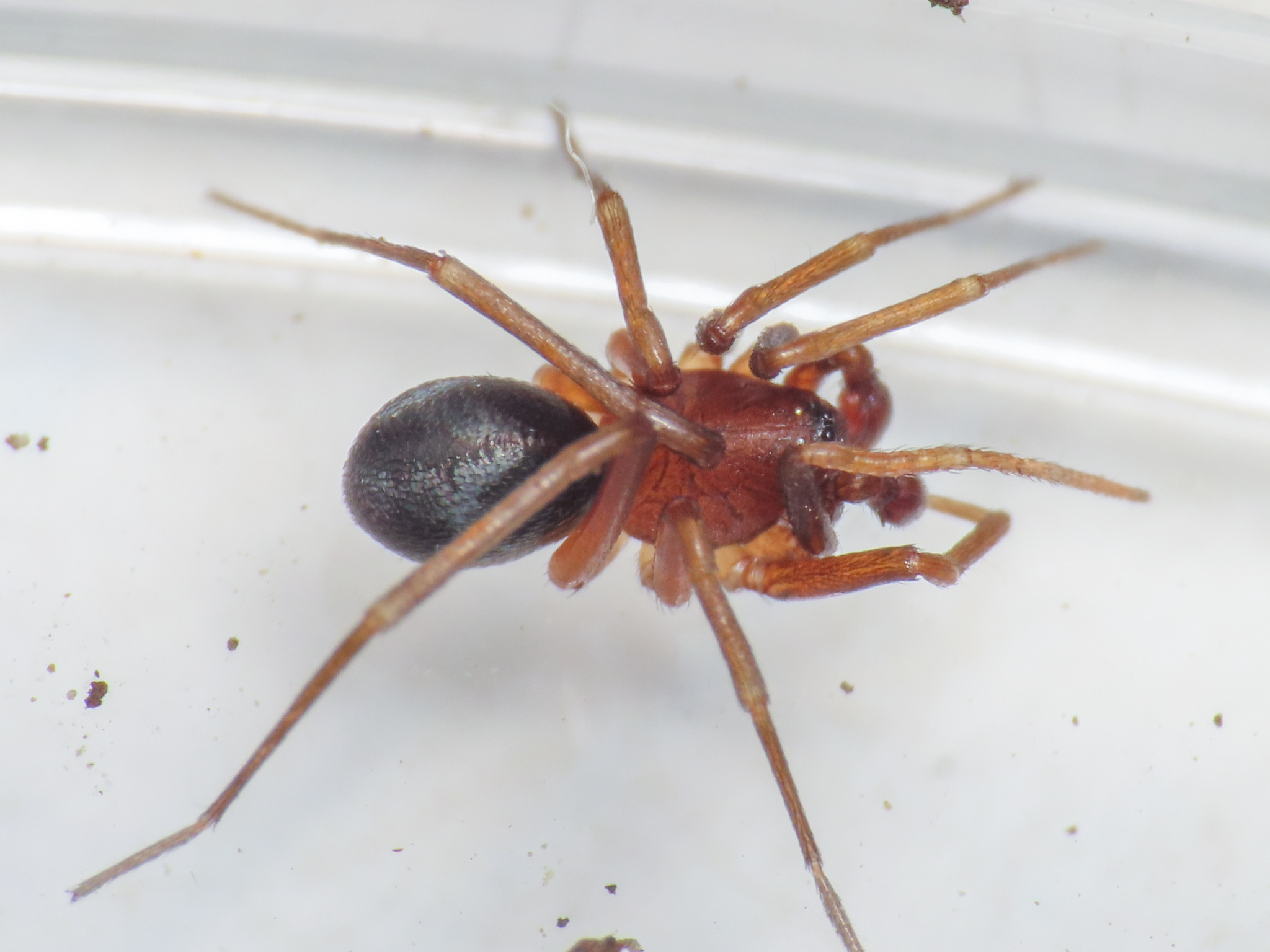

Scientific classification
- Kingdom: Animalia
- Phylum: Arthropoda
- Subphylum: Chelicerata
- Class: Arachnida
- Order: Araneae
- Infraorder: Araneomorphae
- Family: Zodariidae
- Genus: Zodarion
- Species: Z. vicinum

Binomial name
- Zodarion vicinum Denis, 1935

= Zodarion vicinum =

Species of spider

Zodarion vicinum is a species of spider found in Britain and Italy.
