= Zodarion konradi =

Scientific classification
- Kingdom: Animalia
- Phylum: Arthropoda
- Subphylum: Chelicerata
- Class: Arachnida
- Order: Araneae
- Infraorder: Araneomorphae
- Family: Zodariidae
- Genus: Zodarion
- Species: Z. konradi

Binomial name
- Zodarion konradi Bosmans, 2009

Species of spider

Zodarion konradi is a spider species found in Greece and North Macedonia.
