= Zodarion bosmansi =

Scientific classification
- Kingdom: Animalia
- Phylum: Arthropoda
- Subphylum: Chelicerata
- Class: Arachnida
- Order: Araneae
- Infraorder: Araneomorphae
- Family: Zodariidae
- Genus: Zodarion
- Species: Z. bosmansi

Binomial name
- Zodarion bosmansi Pekár & Cardoso, 2005

Species of spider

Zodarion bosmansi is a species of spider found in Portugal. It is usually black or brown with orange-brown legs.
