= Zodarion hamatum =

Scientific classification
- Kingdom: Animalia
- Phylum: Arthropoda
- Subphylum: Chelicerata
- Class: Arachnida
- Order: Araneae
- Infraorder: Araneomorphae
- Family: Zodariidae
- Genus: Zodarion
- Species: Z. hamatum

Binomial name
- Zodarion hamatum Wiehle, 1964

Species of spider

Zodarion hamatum is a European ant-eating spider in the family Zodariidae. Like the closely related Z. italicum, it is nocturnal and captures various ant species. Body length of males is 1.8–2.3 mm (0.1–0.1 in) and of females 2.3–3.8 mm (0.1–0.1 in).

== Distribution ==
It is found in Italy, Austria, Slovenia, and Croatia.
