= Zodarion ludibundum =

Scientific classification
- Kingdom: Animalia
- Phylum: Arthropoda
- Subphylum: Chelicerata
- Class: Arachnida
- Order: Araneae
- Infraorder: Araneomorphae
- Family: Zodariidae
- Genus: Zodarion
- Species: Z. ludibundum

Binomial name
- Zodarion ludibundum Simon, 1914

Species of spider

Zodarion ludibundum is a spider species found in Corsica, Sicily and Algeria.
