= Zodarion graecum =

Scientific classification
- Kingdom: Animalia
- Phylum: Arthropoda
- Subphylum: Chelicerata
- Class: Arachnida
- Order: Araneae
- Infraorder: Araneomorphae
- Family: Zodariidae
- Genus: Zodarion
- Species: Z. graecum

Binomial name
- Zodarion graecum (C. L. Koch, 1843)

Species of spider

Zodarion graecum is a spider species found in Eastern Europe, Turkey, Lebanon and Israel.
