= Zodarion caporiaccoi =

Scientific classification
- Kingdom: Animalia
- Phylum: Arthropoda
- Subphylum: Chelicerata
- Class: Arachnida
- Order: Araneae
- Infraorder: Araneomorphae
- Family: Zodariidae
- Genus: Zodarion
- Species: Z. caporiaccoi

Binomial name
- Zodarion caporiaccoi Roewer, 1942

Species of spider

Zodarion caporiaccoi is a spider species found in Italy.
