= Zodarion aculeatum =

Scientific classification
- Kingdom: Animalia
- Phylum: Arthropoda
- Subphylum: Chelicerata
- Class: Arachnida
- Order: Araneae
- Infraorder: Araneomorphae
- Family: Zodariidae
- Genus: Zodarion
- Species: Z. aculeatum

Binomial name
- Zodarion aculeatum Chyzer, 1897

Species of spider

Zodarion aculeatum is a spider species found in Bulgaria, Romania, Serbia, Albania, and North Macedonia.
