= Zodarion spinibarbe =

Scientific classification
- Kingdom: Animalia
- Phylum: Arthropoda
- Subphylum: Chelicerata
- Class: Arachnida
- Order: Araneae
- Infraorder: Araneomorphae
- Family: Zodariidae
- Genus: Zodarion
- Species: Z. spinibarbe

Binomial name
- Zodarion spinibarbe Wunderlich, 1973

Species of spider

Zodarion spinibarbe is a spider species found in Greece and Turkey.
