= Zodarion sardum =

Scientific classification
- Kingdom: Animalia
- Phylum: Arthropoda
- Subphylum: Chelicerata
- Class: Arachnida
- Order: Araneae
- Infraorder: Araneomorphae
- Family: Zodariidae
- Genus: Zodarion
- Species: Z. sardum

Binomial name
- Zodarion sardum Bosmans, 1997

Species of spider

Zodarion sardum is a spider species found in Sardinia.
