= Zodarion algarvense =

Scientific classification
- Kingdom: Animalia
- Phylum: Arthropoda
- Subphylum: Chelicerata
- Class: Arachnida
- Order: Araneae
- Infraorder: Araneomorphae
- Family: Zodariidae
- Genus: Zodarion
- Species: Z. algarvense

Binomial name
- Zodarion algarvense Bosmans, 1994

Species of ant spider

Zodarion algarvense is a species of ant spider in the genus Zodarion that lives in Portugal. The spider is small, ranging between 2.4 and 3.6 mm (0.094 and 0.142 in) long, although the female is larger than the male. It has a yellowish to yellowish orange carapace with a greyish-brown eye field, a dark sepia opisthosoma that is marked with white spots and pale orange to yellow legs. Its copulatory organs distinguish it from related spiders, particularly the shallow trapezoid depression in the middle of the female's epigyne. The genus Zodarion is known to use ant mimicry for both defence against predators and to deceive ants to prey on them. This attribute could be used as a form of biological pest control.

== Taxonomy ==
Zodarion algarvense is a species of ant spider, a member of the family Zodariidae, that was first described by Robert Bosmans in 1994. The specific name recalls the place where it was first found. It was allocated to the genus Zodarion, circumscribed by Charles Walckenaer in 1826. The genus is a member of the family Zodariidae, first described by Tamerlan Thorell in 1881. RAD sequencing has demonstrated that it is one of the oldest of the extant spider genera, dating to the Cretaceous–Paleogene boundary.

== Description ==
The spider is relatively small. The male has typical total length of 2.4 mm (0.094 in). Its carapace has a typical length of 1.18 mm (0.046 in) and width of 0.92 mm (0.036 in). It is yellowish to yellowish orange with a greyish-brown eye field and has a spot in front of its fovea. Its opisthosoma is dark sepia with a series of white spots towards the back. Its underside is whitish. Its legs are pale orange to yellow. Its spinnerets are dark sepia as well, but the area around them is marked with a dark whitish stripe. The spider's copulatory organs distinguish it from other members of the genus. Although its cymbium is similar in shape to others, its palpal bulb has a characteristic lump towards the top and a wider base. As with other members of the genus, the embolus is accompanied by a spiker, or terminal apophysis. In this species, the embolus is longer. There is also a long apophysis that projects from the palpal tibia, It has a slightly pointed end.

The species shows a degree of sexual dimorphism as the female is larger than the male, with a total length between 3.2 and 3.6 mm (0.13 and 0.14 in). Its carapace is between 1.42 and 1.46 mm (0.056 and 0.057 in) long and between 0.98 and 1.08 mm (0.039 and 0.043 in) wide. Otherwise, externally it is very similar to the male. Its epigyne, the external visible part of its copulatory organs, has a shallow trapezoid depression in the middle and two large spots near the bottom. This distinguishes from other species in the genus.

== Behaviour ==
Zodarion spiders are known to mimic ants for both defensive purposes and to surprise prey. This has led to their common name, ant spiders. The spiders will hunt on ant trails and other places frequented by prey. In three-quarters of observed encounters with ants, the spiders were successful in their deception, and even when not, would frequently attempt to distract their prey and attack from behind. The spiders only prey on ants, and often specific subfamilies of ants. Their success in devouring specific types of ants has led to the proposal to use these spiders as biological pest controls.

== Distribution ==
The majority of Zodarion spiders live in the area around the Mediterranean Sea, particularly the western side. Zodarion algarvense is endemic to Portugal. The holotype was discovered in Monte Gordo in 1971. It has also been observed in the Santo André and Sancha Lagoons Natural Reserve. The species may also be found in Southern Spain and Northern Morocco.
