= Zodarion segurense =

Scientific classification
- Kingdom: Animalia
- Phylum: Arthropoda
- Subphylum: Chelicerata
- Class: Arachnida
- Order: Araneae
- Infraorder: Araneomorphae
- Family: Zodariidae
- Genus: Zodarion
- Species: Z. segurense

Binomial name
- Zodarion segurense Bosmans, 1994

Species of spider

Zodarion segurense is a spider species found in Spain.
