= Ludovico di Caporiacco =

Italian arachnologist

Ludovico di Caporiacco (22 January 1900, in Udine – 18 July 1951, in Parma) was an Italian arachnologist.

Caporiacco took part in an expedition to the Jebel Uweinat, a mountain massif in the boundary region of Sudan, Libya, and Egypt. On the mission, he, together with Hungarian explorer László Almásy, discovered the prehistoric rock paintings of Ain Doua in 1933. In 1943 he was appointed professor of zoology to the faculty of sciences at the University of Parma.

He was the author of numerous scientific papers on arachnids native to Italy and other Mediterranean regions. He also published articles on species indigenous to East Africa, Central Asia (Himalayas and the Karakoram) as well as Central and South America. He was the taxonomic authority of numerous arachnid genera and species. Taxa with specific epithet of caporiaccoi are named in his honor, an example being the spider species Zodarion caporiaccoi.
