= C16H17NO4 =

The molecular formula C_{16}H_{17}NO_{4} (molar mass: 287.31 g/mol) may refer to:

- Hamayne, an alkaloid
- Lycorine, a toxic alkaloid
- Noroxymorphone, an opioid
- Pipermethystine, an alkaloid present in the aerial portions of the kava plant
- Tetrahydropapaveroline, a tetrahydroisoquinoline alkaloid
