= Zephyranthes grandiflora =

Zephyranthes grandiflora may refer to either of two flowering plant species:

- Zephyranthes carinata (as Zephyranthes grandiflora auct. non Lindl.), an ornamental plant commonly referred to as Z. grandiflora in horticultural contexts
- Zephyranthes minuta (as Zephyranthes grandiflora Lindl.)
