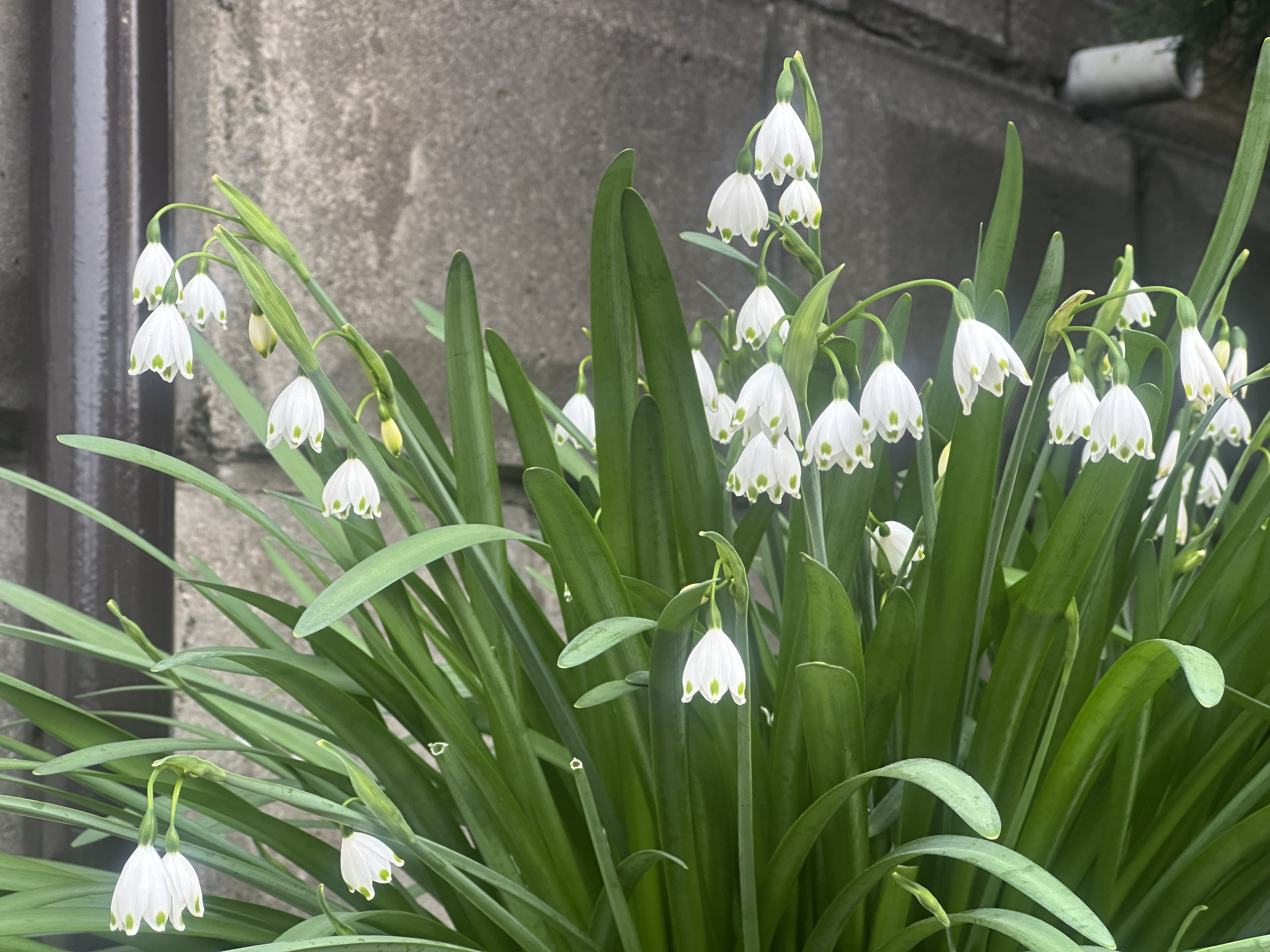

Conservation status
- Least Concern (IUCN 3.1)

Scientific classification
- Kingdom: Plantae
- Clade: Tracheophytes
- Clade: Angiosperms
- Clade: Monocots
- Order: Asparagales
- Family: Amaryllidaceae
- Subfamily: Amaryllidoideae
- Genus: Leucojum
- Species: L. aestivum

Binomial name
- Leucojum aestivum L.

Synonyms
- Leucojum hernandezii Cambess.; Leucojum pulchellum Salisb.; Nivaria aestivalis Moench; Nivaria monadelphia Medik.; Polyanthemum aestivale (Moench) Bubani

= Leucojum aestivum =

Species of flowering plant in the amaryllis family

Leucojum aestivum, commonly called the summer snowflake, giant snowflake, Loddon lily (see River Loddon § Loddon lily) and rarely snowbell and dewdrop among others, (Note: Other older vernacular names include mountain snowdrop and summer snowdrop.) is a plant species widely cultivated as an ornamental. It is native to most of Europe from Spain and Ireland to Ukraine, with the exception of Scandinavia, Russia, Belarus and the Baltic countries. It is also considered native to Turkey, Iran and the Caucasus. It is naturalized in Denmark, South Australia, New South Wales, Nova Scotia and much of the eastern United States.

== Description ==
Leucojum aestivum is a perennial bulbous plant, generally 35–60 cm (14–24 in) tall, but some forms reach 90 cm (35 in). Its leaves, which are well developed at the time of flowering, are strap-shaped, 5–20 mm (0.2–0.8 in) wide, reaching to about the same height as the flowers. The flowering stem (scape) is hollow and has wings with translucent margins. The pendant flowers appear in late spring and are borne in umbels of usually three to five, sometimes as many as seven. The flower stalks (pedicels) are of different lengths, 25–70 mm (1.0–2.8 in) long. The flowers are about 3–4 cm (1.2–1.6 in) in diameter and have six white tepals, each with a greenish mark just below the tip. The black seeds are 5–7 mm (0.2–0.3 in) long.

After flowering, the fruits develop flotation chambers but remain attached to the stem. In Britain, it has been recorded that flooding causes the stems to break and the fruits to be carried downstream and stranded in river debris or on flood-plains. The bulbs can also be transported during heavy floods and deposited on river banks.

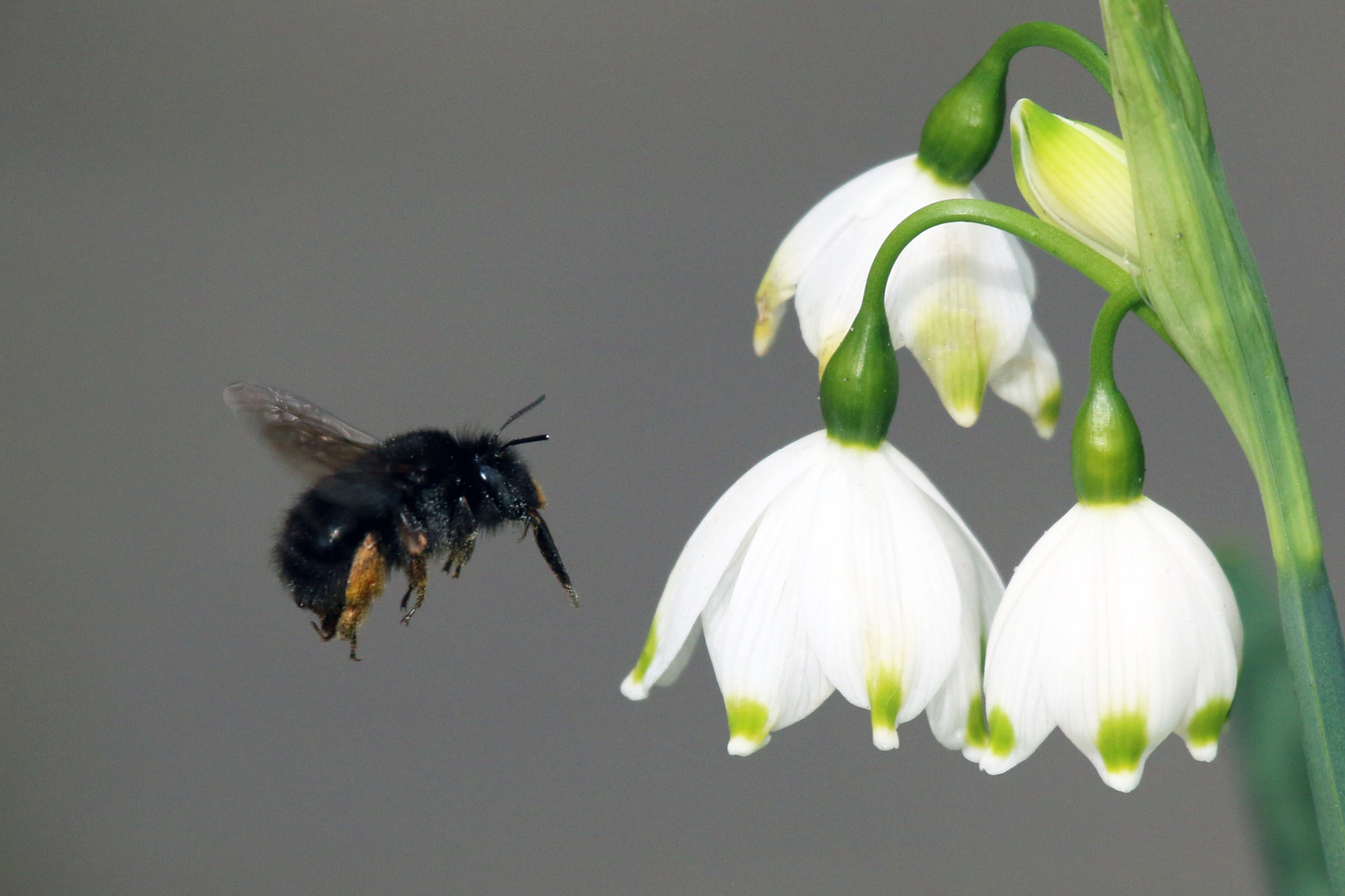
Flower bee (Anthophora plumipes) approaching flowers

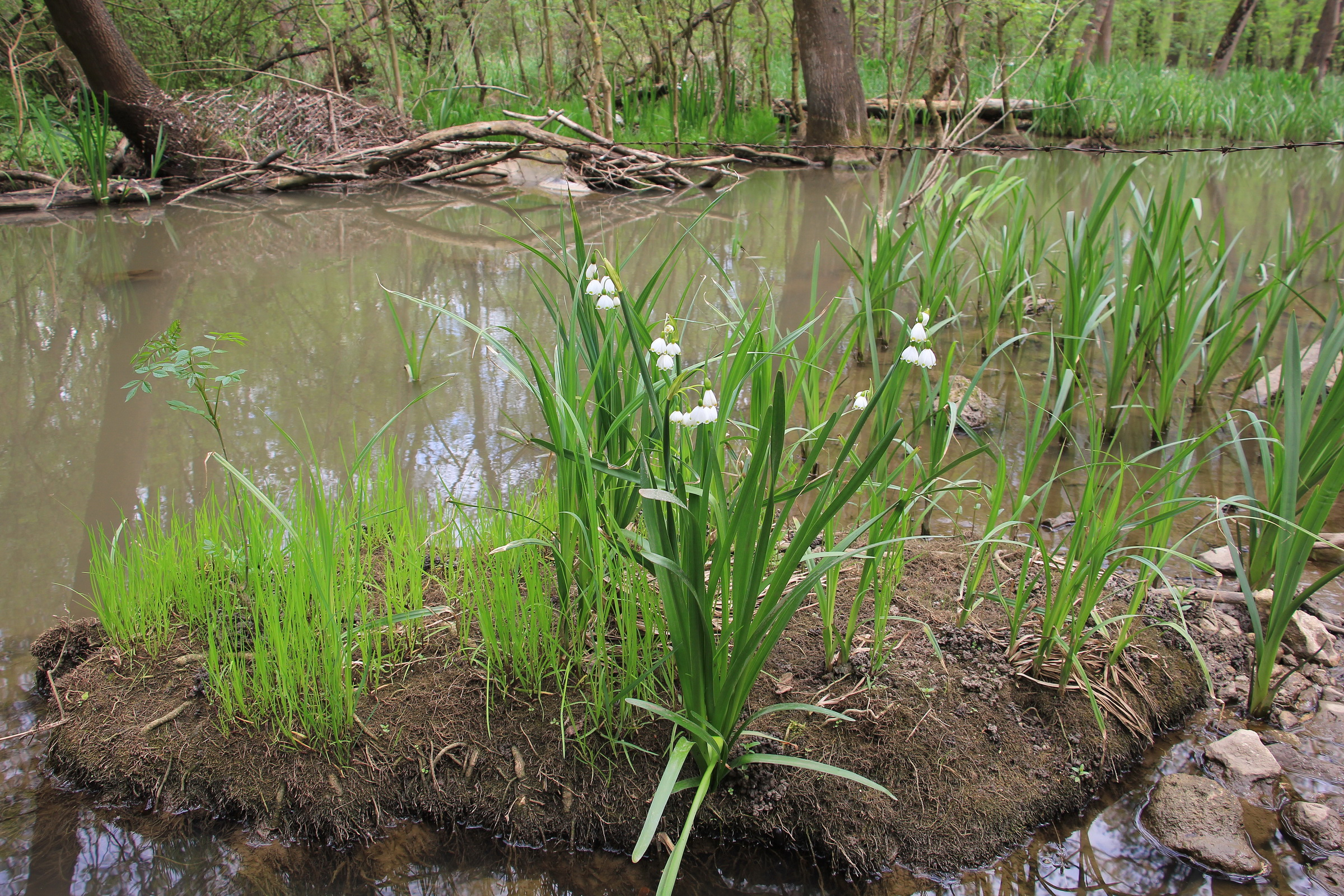
Growing by water in Bulgaria

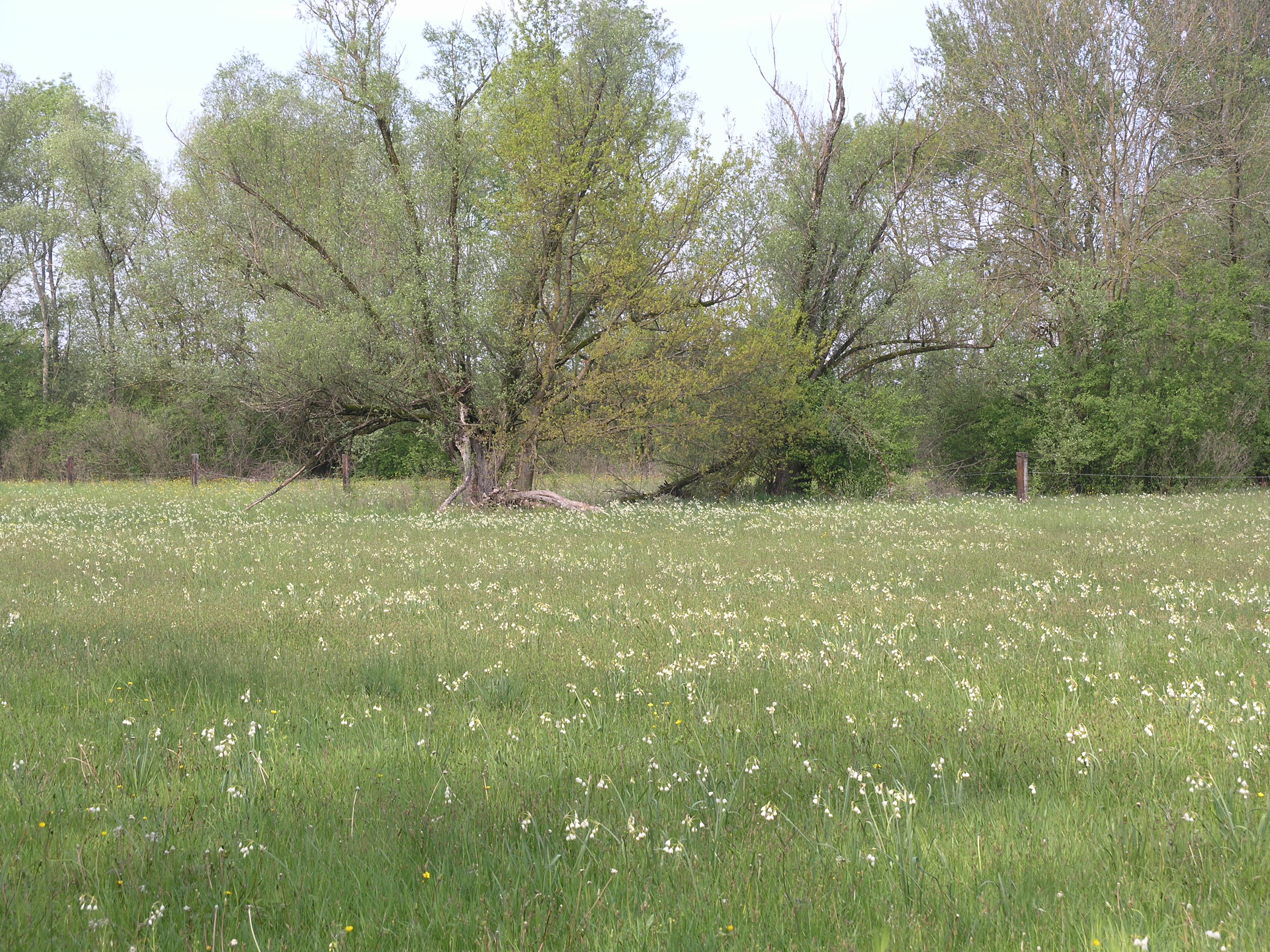
Growing in a damp meadow in Croatia

== Taxonomy ==
Leucojum aestivum was first described by Carl Linnaeus in 1759. The Latin specific epithet aestivum means "of the summer". Two subspecies have been recognized (sometimes as varieties rather than subspecies): the nominate L. aestivum subsp. aestivum and L. aestivum subsp. pulchellum. The latter has also been treated as a separate species, L. pulchellum. L. aestivum subsp. pulchellum is differentiated by its generally smaller dimensions. It has 1–5 flowers per stem compared to the 3–8 of subsp. aestivum and is restricted to swampy areas in the western Mediterranean. The World Checklist of Selected Plant Families does not recognize any infraspecific taxa.

Leucojum vernum, its close relative (and the only other species in the genus Leucojum), flowers in Spring.

== Distribution and habitat ==
Leucojum aestivum is native to most of Europe, with the exception of Scandinavia, Russia, Belarus, and the Baltic Republics, and is also native to Turkey, the Caucasus, and Iran. It is naturalized in other parts of Europe, including Denmark, in South Australia, New South Wales, Nova Scotia, and much of the eastern United States. L. aestivum is found in damp places, such as wet meadows, swamps, and ditches.

== Cultivation ==
Leucojum aestivum is cultivated as an ornamental plant for its flowers. It requires a damp position, growing well on clay soils, where it increases rapidly. The cultivar 'Gravetye Giant' is robust, growing to 90 cm (35 in) with up to eight flowers on each scape. It is named after Gravetye Manor, an Elizabethan manor house in West Sussex, England, the former home of the gardener William Robinson. 'Gravetye Giant' has gained the Royal Horticultural Society's Award of Garden Merit. Another cultivar is 'Nancy Lindsay'. Shorter and more compact than 'Gravetye Giant' at 50–60 cm (20–24 in), its flowers, 5–6 per stem, have tepals that are rounder and broader. It originated in a garden in southern France owned by Nancy Lindsay.

== Toxicity ==
All species of Leucojum are poisonous, as they produce the alkaloids lycorine and galantamine.
