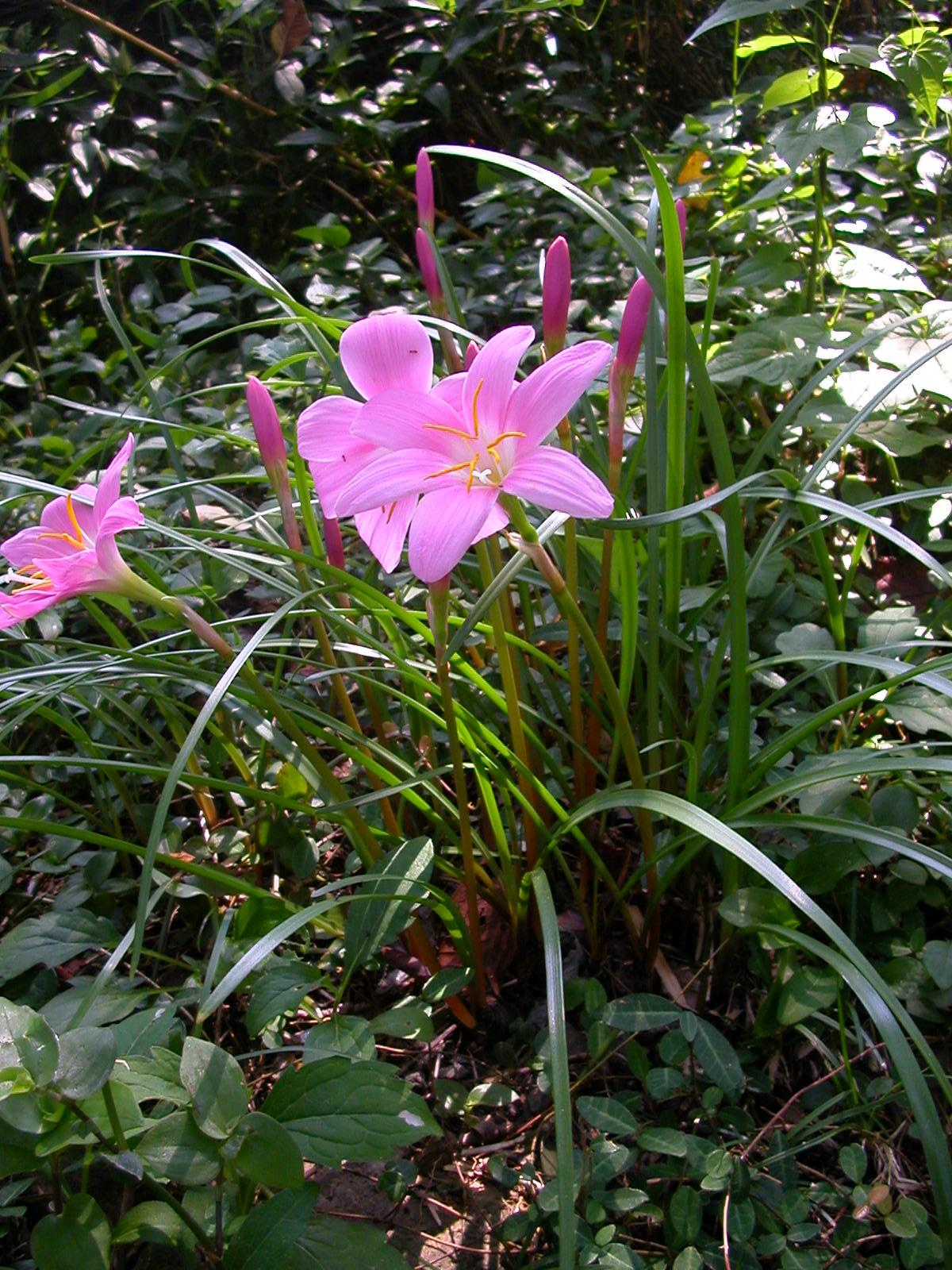
- In Nishiizu, Japan

Scientific classification
- Kingdom: Plantae
- Clade: Embryophytes
- Clade: Tracheophytes
- Clade: Angiosperms
- Clade: Monocots
- Order: Asparagales
- Family: Amaryllidaceae
- Subfamily: Amaryllidoideae
- Genus: Zephyranthes
- Species: Z. carinata

Binomial name
- Zephyranthes carinata Herb.

Synonyms
- Amaryllis carinata (Herb.) Spreng.; Atamosco carinata (Herb.) P. Wilson; Atamosco carinata (Herb.) Standl. in Standl. & Calderón; Pogonema carinata (Herb.) Raf.; Zephyranthes grandiflora Lindl. nom. illeg.

= Zephyranthes carinata =

Rosepink zephyr lily

Species of plant

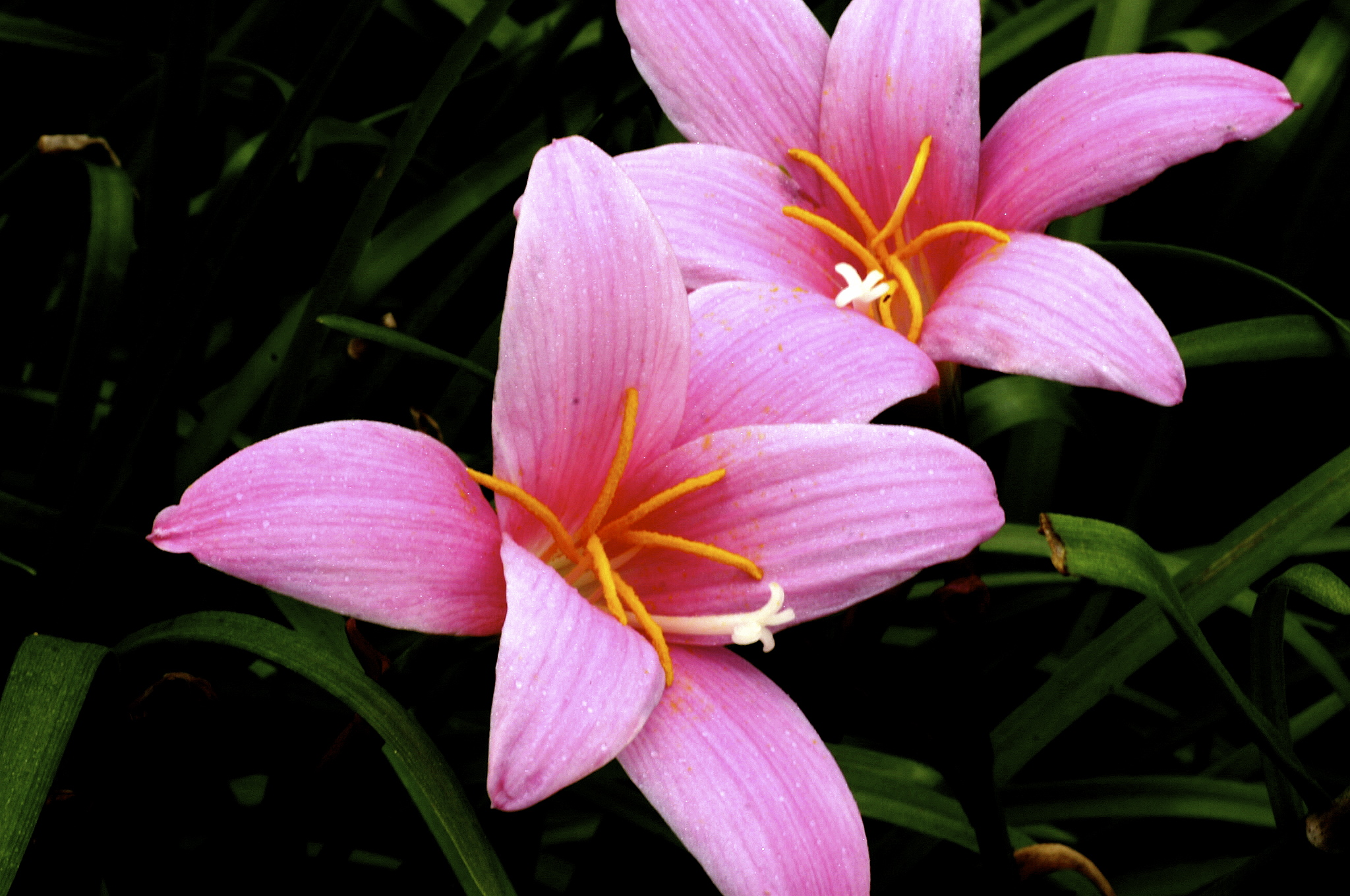
Flowers; from Ault Park, Cincinnati

Zephyranthes carinata, commonly known as the rosepink zephyr lily or pink rain lily, is a perennial flowering plant native to Mexico, Colombia and Central America. It is also widely cultivated as an ornamental and naturalized in the West Indies, Peru, Argentina, Brazil, the southeastern United States from Texas to Florida, Zimbabwe, South Africa, China, Korea, the Ryukyu Islands, Assam, Nepal, Bhutan, Sri Lanka, Solomon Islands, Queensland, Society Islands, Kiribati, and Caroline Islands.

Zephyranthes carinata has large bright pink flowers, around 10 cm (4 in), and green strap-like leaves. They are found naturally in moist, open areas, often near woodlands.

Like other rain lilies, their common name refers to their habit of blooming soon after a heavy rainfall. They are widely grown in gardens as annuals and as container plants, although they will overwinter in warm climates.

Zephyranthes carinata is often incorrectly referred to as Zephyranthes grandiflora, especially in horticulture.

== Description ==
Zephyranthes carinata grows from tunicate globular bulbs 2 to 3 cm (0.8 to 1.2 in) in diameter. The tunics are wine-red in color. Four to six linear and flattened leaves are produced by each bulb. Each is 15 to 30 cm (6 to 12 in) long and 6 to 8 mm (0.24 to 0.31 in) wide, reddish at the bases and bright green for the rest of their lengths.

The funnel-shaped flowers are solitary, with pink to rose red perianths. They are borne erect or slightly inclined on scapes 10 to 15 cm (4 to 6 in) long. The deep lilac to purplish spathes are 25 to 30 mm (1.0 to 1.2 in) long. There are two lengths of the stamen filaments - 15 mm (0.6 in) and 21 mm (0.8 in). The anthers are 6 mm (0.24 in) in length. The style is filiform.

The flowers develop into more or less spherical or three-lobed capsules. The seeds are shiny black and flattened.

== Classification ==
Zephyranthes carinata belongs to the genus Zephyranthes (rain lilies) of the tribe Hippeastreae. It is classified under the subfamily Amaryllidoideae of the Amaryllis family (Amaryllidaceae). In broader classifications, they are sometimes included within the lily family (Liliaceae).

Zephyranthes carinata is often referred to as Zephyranthes grandiflora, especially in horticulture. However, the former name was published earlier, hence Z. grandiflora is considered superfluous and illegitimate. Another name identified as an earlier synonym of Z. carinata is now considered to be a different species—Zephyranthes minuta—and Z. grandiflora is considered a legitimate synonym of that.

== Nomenclature ==
Zephyranthes carinata is also known as the rosepink rain lily, rosepink magic lily, or pink magic lily. Like other rain lilies, their common name refers to their habit of blooming soon after a heavy rainfall. However, cultivated specimens of Z. carinata can be induced to flower all throughout the year by maintaining humidity.

They are one of the three species of Zephyranthes commonly known as "pink rain lilies", the other two being Z. rosea and Z. robusta. Z. rosea is a much smaller species with pink flowers that have green centers. H. robustus, on the other hand, have generally paler pink and more strongly bent flowers.

Common names of Z. carinata in other languages include:

- Chinese – jiǔlán (韭蘭), jiǔlián (韭蓮)
- French – petit lis rose, lis bordures
- German – großblütige Windblume
- Korean – nadosapeuran (나도사프란)
- Spanish – adelfa, Corazón de Maria, duende rosado, Lágrimas de María

== Distribution and habitat ==
Zephyranthes carinata is native to Central America, from Mexico to Colombia. They have been introduced elsewhere and have become widely naturalized. They are usually found in open pastures and hill slopes.

== Uses ==
Zephyranthes carinata are widely cultivated as ornamentals. They are able to survive colder temperatures than other species of Zephyranthes.

== Chemical composition ==
It contains lycorine, galanthine, tazettine, haemanthamine, pretazetine, carinatine, tortuosine, trisphaeridine, hamayne and pancratistatin.

== Toxicity ==
Like other species of Zephyranthes, Z. carinata contain toxic alkaloids including pretazettine, carinatine, lycorine, galantamine, and haemanthamine. If ingested, they can cause vomiting, convulsions, and death.

== See also ==
- Zephyranthes atamasca – the Atamasco lily
- Zephyranthes candida – the white rain lily
- Zephyranthes puertoricensis – the Puerto Rican zephyr lily
