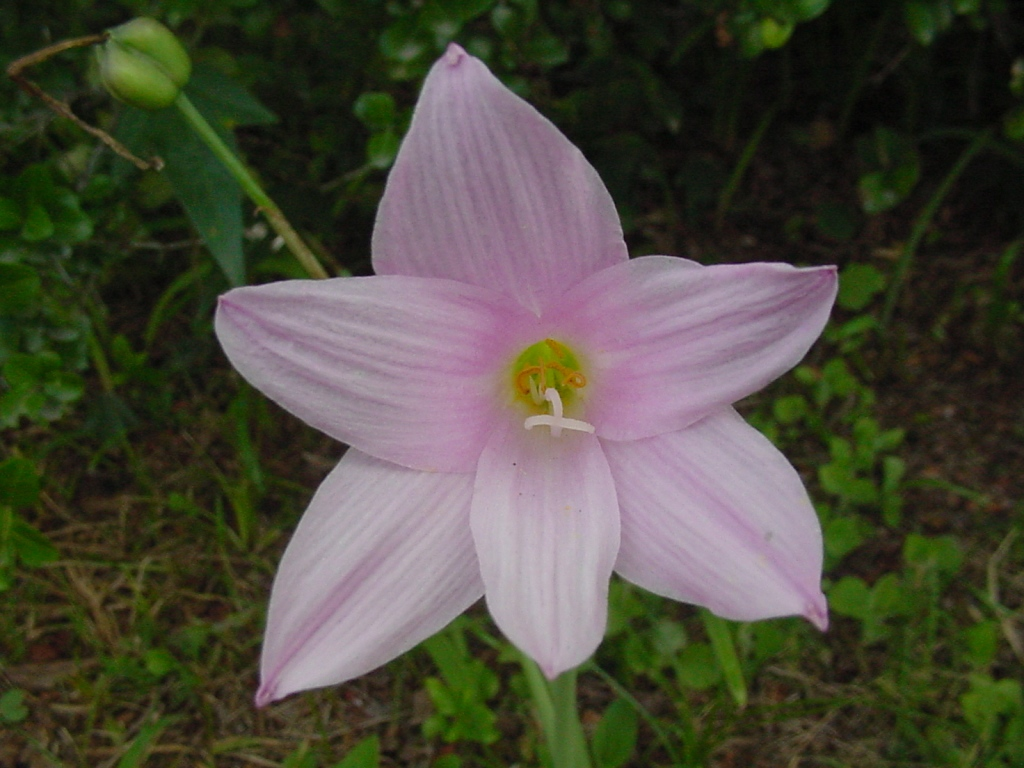

Scientific classification
- Kingdom: Plantae
- Clade: Tracheophytes
- Clade: Angiosperms
- Clade: Monocots
- Order: Asparagales
- Family: Amaryllidaceae
- Subfamily: Amaryllidoideae
- Genus: Zephyranthes
- Species: Z. robusta

Binomial name
- Zephyranthes robusta (Herb.) Baker

Synonyms
- Amaryllis berteroi Spreng.; Amaryllis robusta (Herb.) Sweet ex Steud.; Habranthus berteroi (Spreng.) M.Roem.; Habranthus quilmesianus Ravenna; Habranthus robustus Herb.; Hippeastrum berteroi (Spreng.) Christenh. & Byng; Hippeastrum quilmesianum (Ravenna) Christenh. & Byng; Zephyranthes taubertiana Harms; Zephyranthes taubertii Harms

= Zephyranthes robusta =

Species of plant

Zephyranthes robusta, commonly known as the Brazilian copperlily, pink fairy lily or the pink rain lily, is a species of herbaceous flowering bulb in the family Amaryllidaceae. It is native to Brazil, Argentina and Uruguay, but is now naturalized in Florida, Colombia, South Africa, and Mauritius.

== Description ==
Zephyranthes robusta is a relatively large species of rain lily. It grows from ovate to obovate bulbs around 3.5 to 5 cm (1.4 to 2.0 in) in diameter.

Plants bear solitary lavender to pale pink, funnel-shaped flowers, 5–6 cm (2.0–2.4 in) long, held at a slight angle on 15–30 cm (5.9–11.8 in) scapes, with a leaf-like bract 1.8–4 cm (0.71–1.57 in) long at the base. Flowers typically appear after rain from late summer to early fall and are followed by large deep green leaves, measuring 5 to 10 mm (0.20 to 0.39 in) wide and 30 to 40 cm (12 to 16 in) long.

== Taxonomy and nomenclature ==
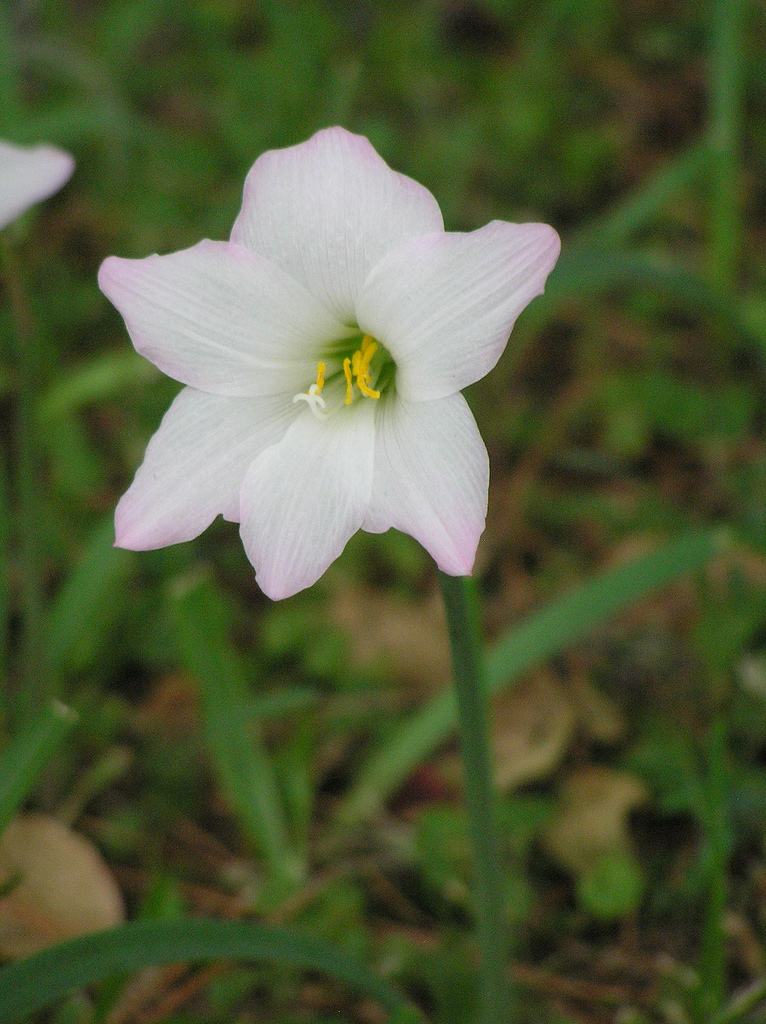
H. robustus from Florida.

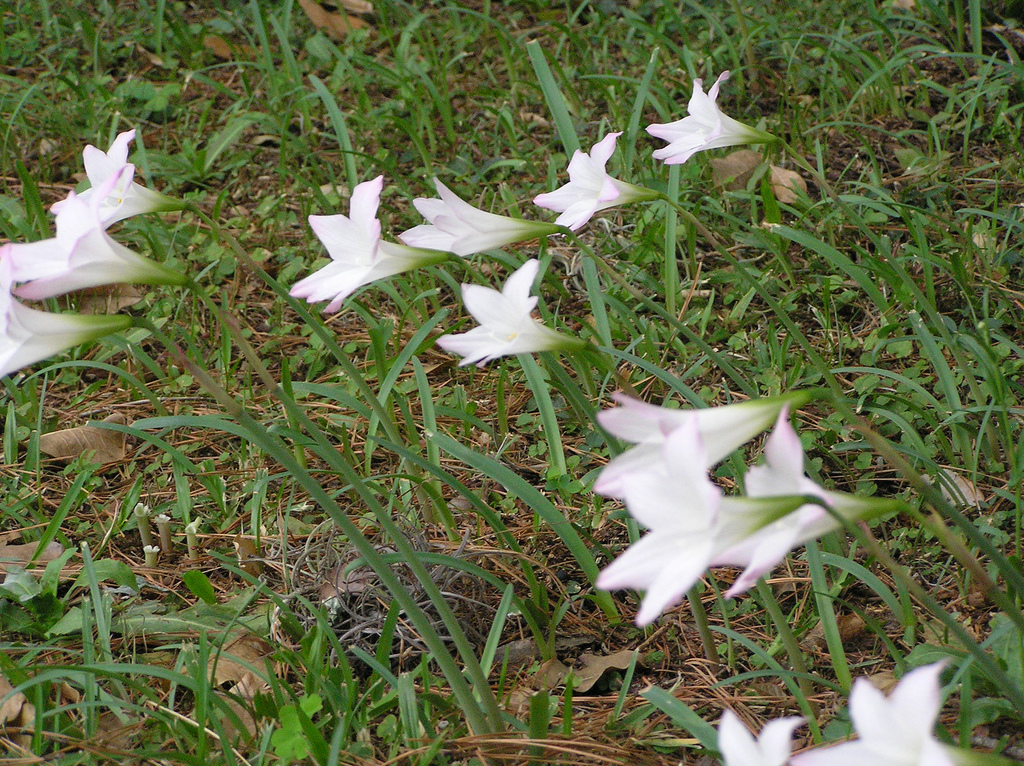
H. robustus have declineate slightly asymmetrical flowers.

Zephyranthes robusta belongs to the genus Zephyranthes (rain lilies) of the tribe Hippeastreae, within the subfamily Amaryllidoideae of the amaryllis family (Amaryllidaceae). In older classifications, it was sometimes included within the lily family (Liliaceae). Once treated as Habranthus robustus, it is now re-included in Zephyranthes.

It is commonly known as the 'pink fairy lily', 'pink rain lily', 'pink zephyr lily', 'pink magic lily', 'pink fawn lily', and 'Colombian mini-amaryllis'. It is known as cebollita in Spanish.

Due to having the same common names, it is also frequently confused with other 'pink rain lilies' - namely Zephyranthes rosea and Zephyranthes carinata (also sold under the name Zephyranthes grandiflora). The three species are often mislabeled, but Z. robusta is easily recognizable from the other two by its larger, more strongly bent (and often asymmetrical), paler pink flowers. Z. robusta also has leaves covered with a fine grayish waxy coating (glaucous) in contrast to the leaves of Z. carinata.

== Distribution and habitat ==
Zephyranthes robusta is believed to have originated from Rio Grande do Sul of Brazil. It is native to Brazil, Argentina, and Uruguay, and is widely naturalized elsewhere.

== Cultivation and uses ==
Zephyranthes robusta is widely grown as an ornamental. It is one of the most prolific of the summer flowering rain lilies. They are propagated by dividing the bulbs (including offsets) and from seed. They are not as tolerant of colder temperatures as other rain lilies.

== Chemical composition ==
The plant contains some toxic compounds like lycorine. Other compound include galanthamine, 3-epimacronine, hippeastidine, lycoramine, galanthine, haemanthamine, haemanthidine, hamayne, tazettine, vittatine, 11-hydroxy vittatine, 8-O-demethylmaritidine.

== Toxicity ==
Similar to the closely related species of Zephyranthes, Z. robusta contains toxic alkaloids. Mainly galantamine-type alkaloids which can be lethal for humans.
