= Zephyranthes minuta =

Scientific classification
- Kingdom: Plantae
- Clade: Tracheophytes
- Clade: Angiosperms
- Clade: Monocots
- Order: Asparagales
- Family: Amaryllidaceae
- Subfamily: Amaryllidoideae
- Genus: Zephyranthes
- Species: Z. minuta

Binomial name
- Zephyranthes minuta (Kunth) D.Dietr.

Synonyms
- Amaryllis minima Ker Gawl.; Amaryllis minuta Kunth; Amaryllis striatula Schult. & Schult.f.; Zephyranthes ackermannia (Herb.) M.Roem.; Zephyranthes grahamiana Herb.; Zephyranthes grandiflora Lindl.; Zephyranthes lilacina Liebm.; Zephyranthes pallida M.Roem.; Zephyranthes sessilis var. ackermannia Herb.; Zephyranthes sessilis var. striata (Herb.) Herb.; Zephyranthes sessilis var. verecunda (Herb.) Herb.; Zephyranthes striata Herb.; Zephyranthes verecunda Herb.

Species of plant

Zephyranthes minuta is a perennial flowering plant species also referred to as Zephyranthes grandiflora. The latter is, however, an illegitimate name because the original author in coining the name Zephyranthes grandiflora listed the older name Amaryllis minuta as a synonym. This makes "minuta" the acceptable epithet under the ICN. Confusingly, Z. grandiflora is also used as a synonym for Zephyranthes carinata, and this usage is very common in horticultural contexts.

In the UK Z. minuta is a recipient of the Royal Horticultural Society's Award of Garden Merit.

== Description ==
Zephyranthes minuta is a bulb-forming perennial with shiny green leaves up to 7 mm wide. Flowers in wild specimens are usually pink, funnel-shaped, up to 9 cm long. Cultivated specimens are frequently larger, often with extra tepals.

== Distribution ==
Zephyranthes minuta is native to Mexico and Guatemala.

== Chemical composition ==
The following compounds are found in this plant: Pancratistatin, Zephgrabetaine, Lycorine, Galanthine, Lycoramine, Hamayne, Hamanthamine, Tortuosine, Ungeremin.

== Gallery ==
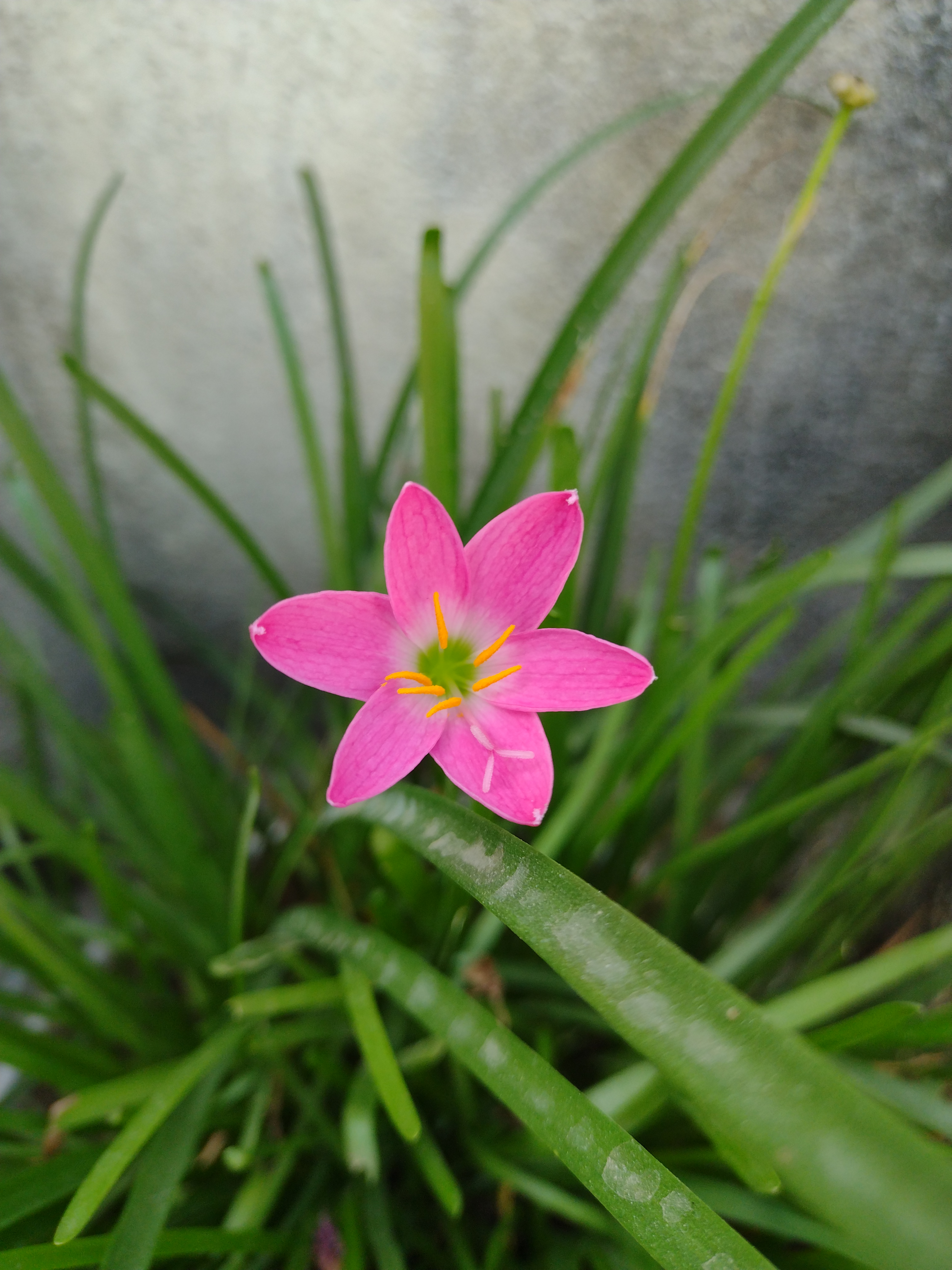

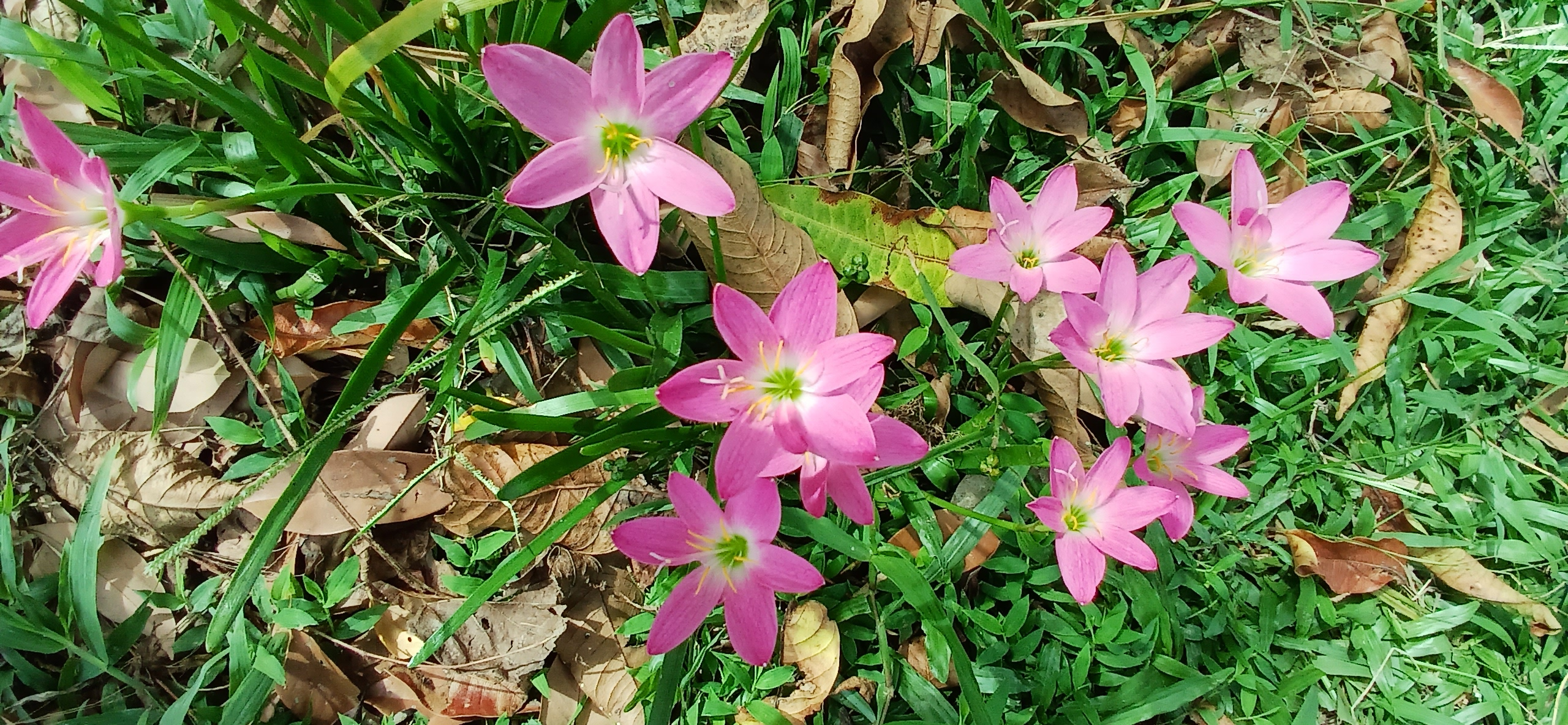
