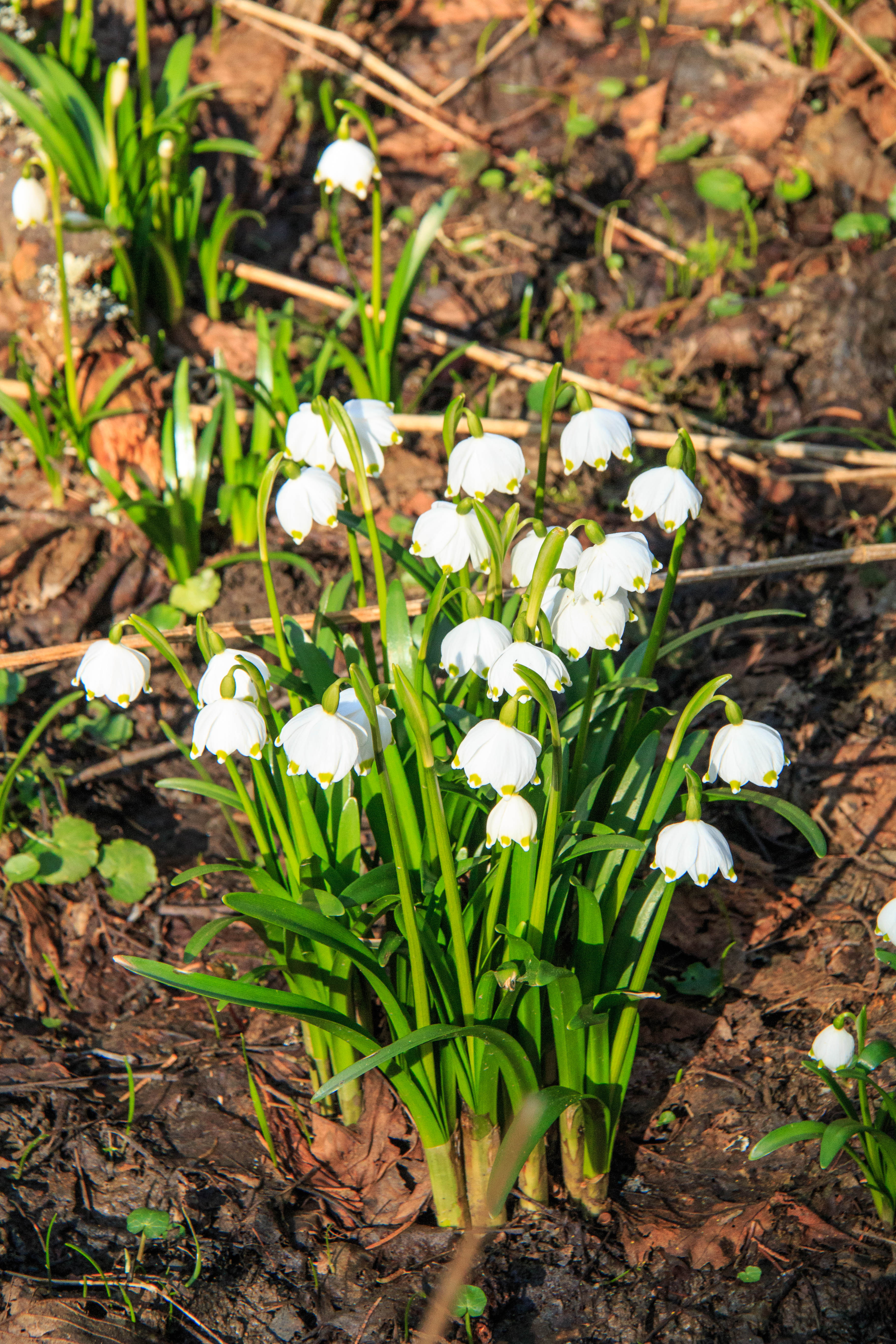

Scientific classification
- Kingdom: Plantae
- Clade: Embryophytes
- Clade: Tracheophytes
- Clade: Angiosperms
- Clade: Monocots
- Order: Asparagales
- Family: Amaryllidaceae
- Subfamily: Amaryllidoideae
- Genus: Leucojum
- Species: L. vernum

Binomial name
- Leucojum vernum L.

Synonyms
- Galanthus vernus (L.) All.; Nivaria verna (L.) Moench; Erinosma verna (L.) Herb.

= Leucojum vernum =

Species of flowering plant

Leucojum vernum, commonly called the spring snowflake, St. Agnes' flower (for the patron saint of virgins), and rarely snowbell among others, (Note: Other older vernacular names include common snowdrop, great spring snowdrop, common bulbous violet and butter and eggs (in Dorset).) is a species of flowering plant in the family Amaryllidaceae. It is native to central and southern Europe from Belgium to Ukraine. It is considered naturalized in north-western Europe, including Great Britain and parts of Scandinavia, and in the US states of Georgia and Florida. This spring flowering bulbous herbaceous perennial is cultivated as an ornamental for a sunny position. The plant multiplies in favourable conditions to form clumps. Each plant bears a single white flower with greenish marks near the tip of the tepal, on a stem about 10–20 cm (3.9–7.9 in) tall, occasionally more.

The Latin specific epithet vernum means "relating to Spring"; its close relative, Leucojum aestivum, flowers in summer.

== Description ==
Leucojum vernum is 12–35 cm (4.7–13.8 in) tall in flower. Its leaves, which appear at the same time as the flowers and continue to elongate during flowering, are 5–25 mm wide and 10–25 cm (3.9–9.8 in) long, generally reaching to below the level of the flowers. The flowering stem (scape) has a small central cavity and two narrow wings. The pendent flowers appear in spring and are usually solitary, rarely in an umbel of two. The flowers have six white tepals, each with a greenish or yellowish mark just below the tip. Each tepal is 15–25 mm long. The whitish seeds are about 7 mm long.

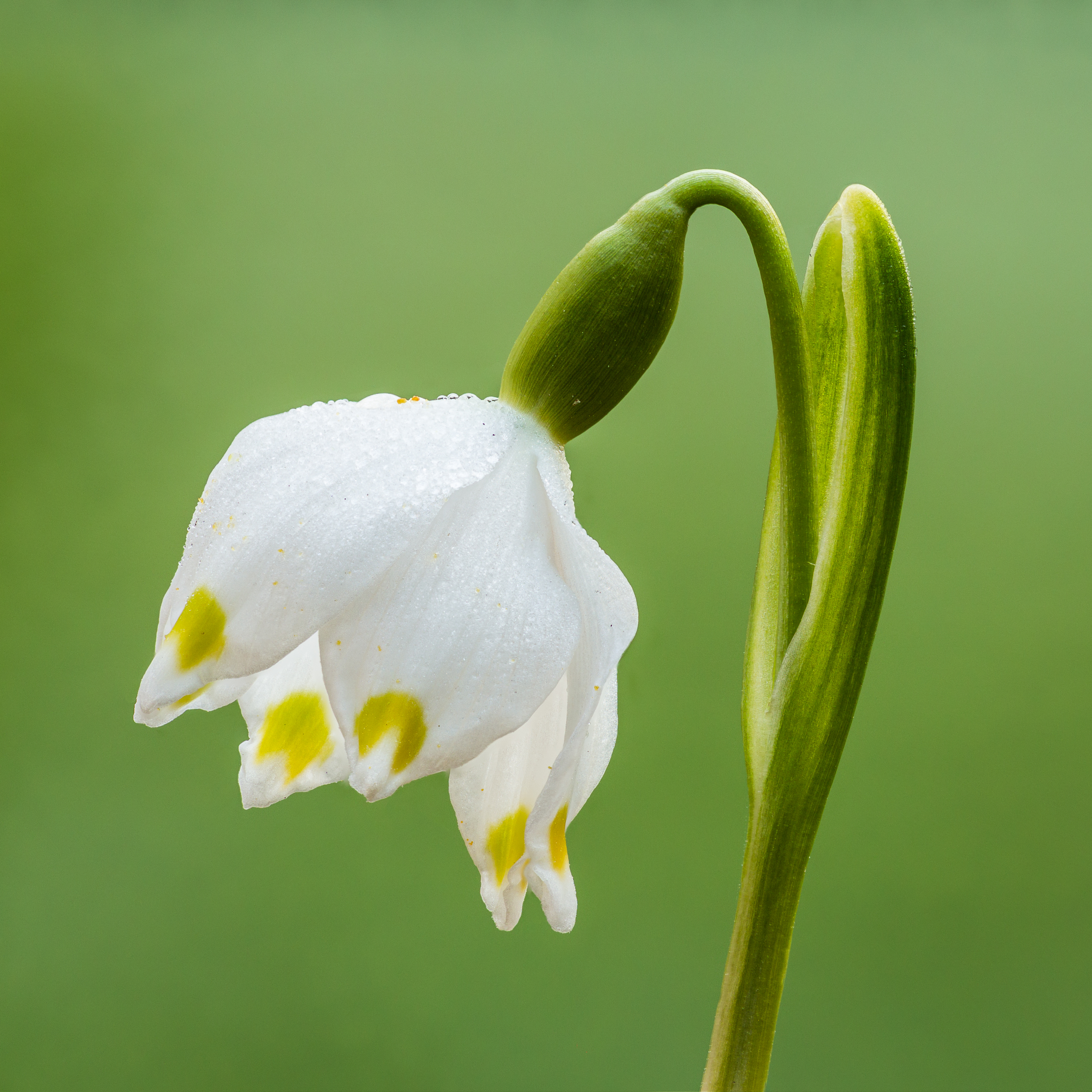
Delicate flower of a Leucojum vernum in March

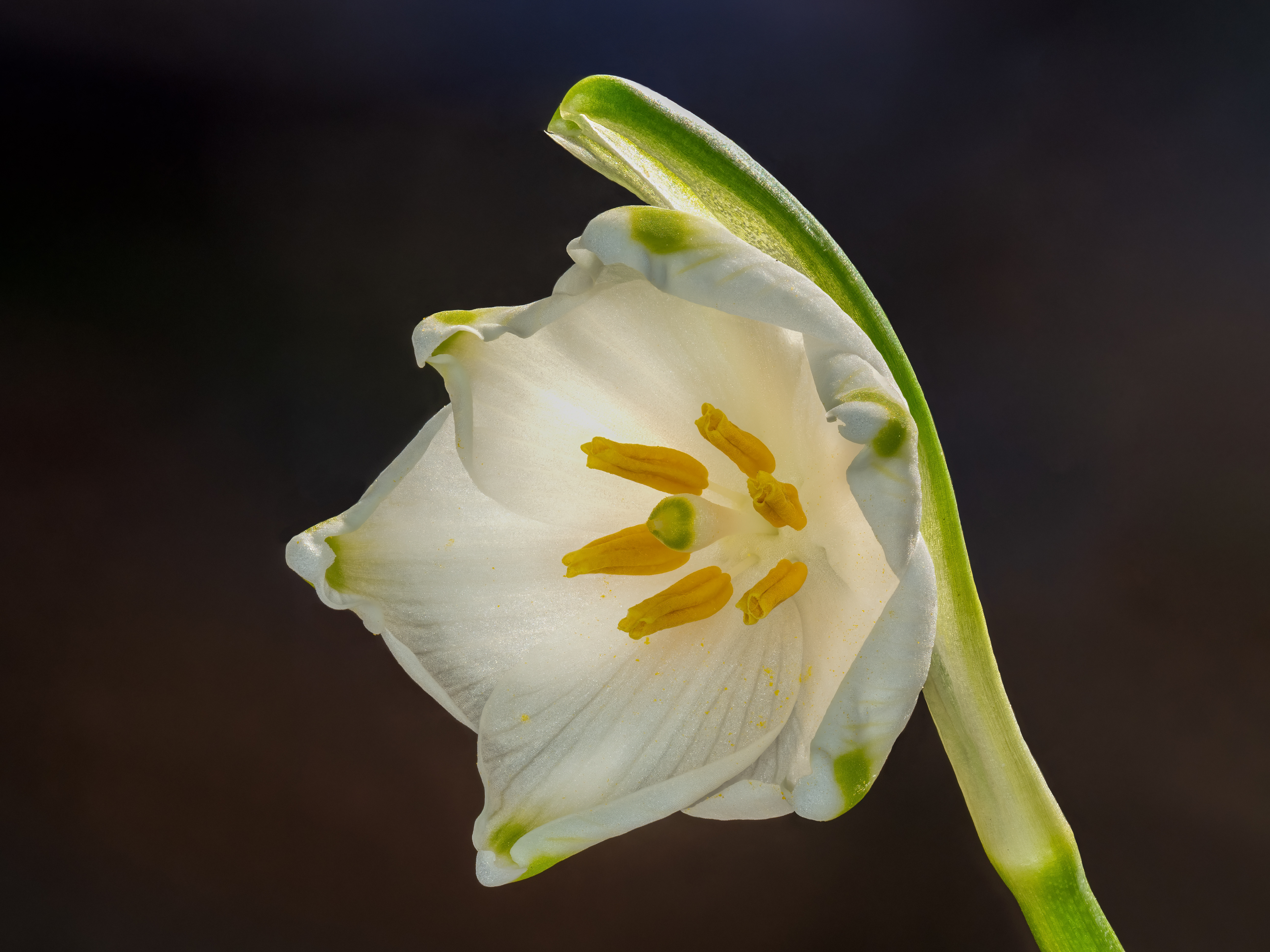
Close-up of flower, photographed in a garden in Bamberg, Germany

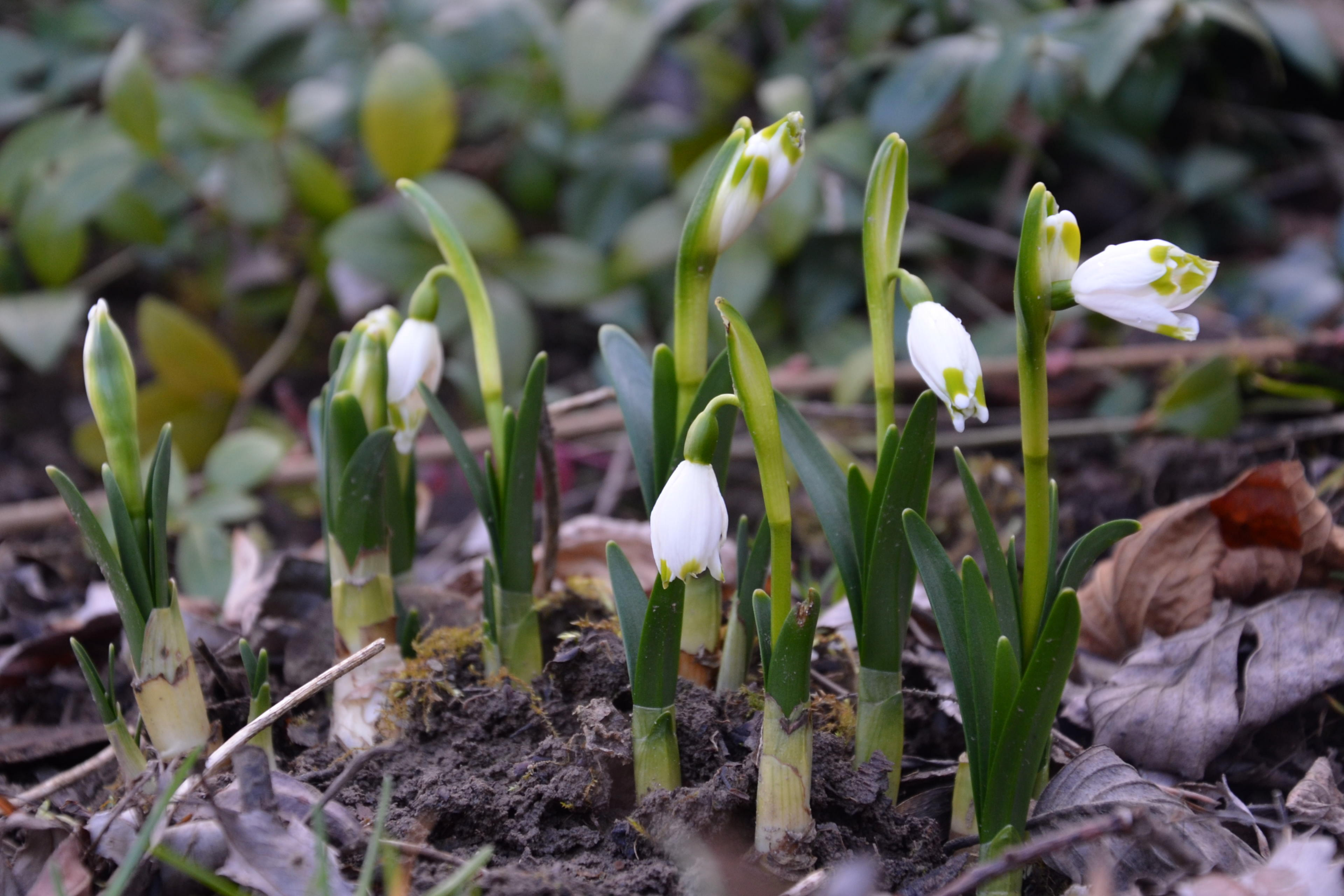
At the start of flowering

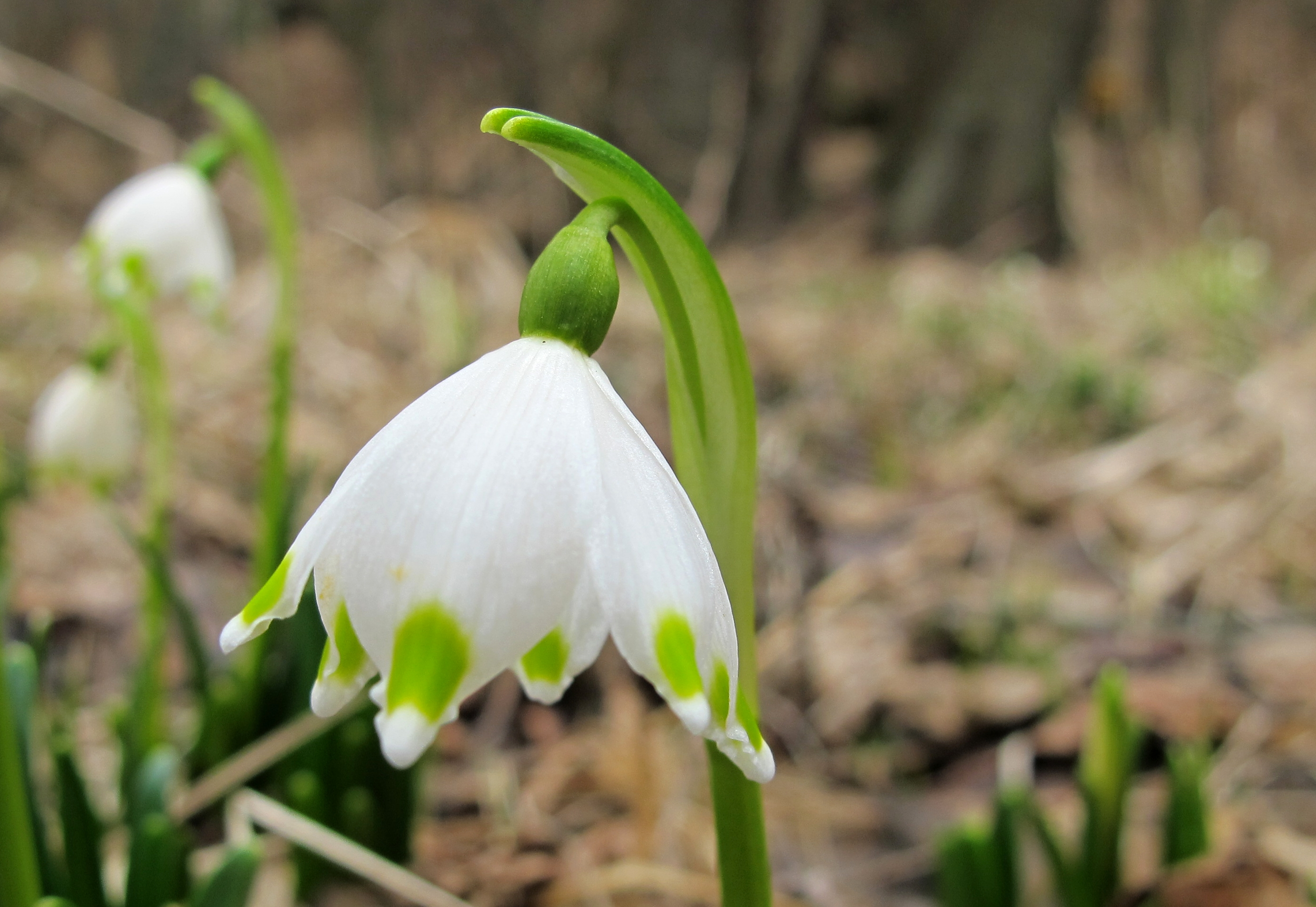
Typical Leucojum vernum var. vernum form with green marks on the tepals

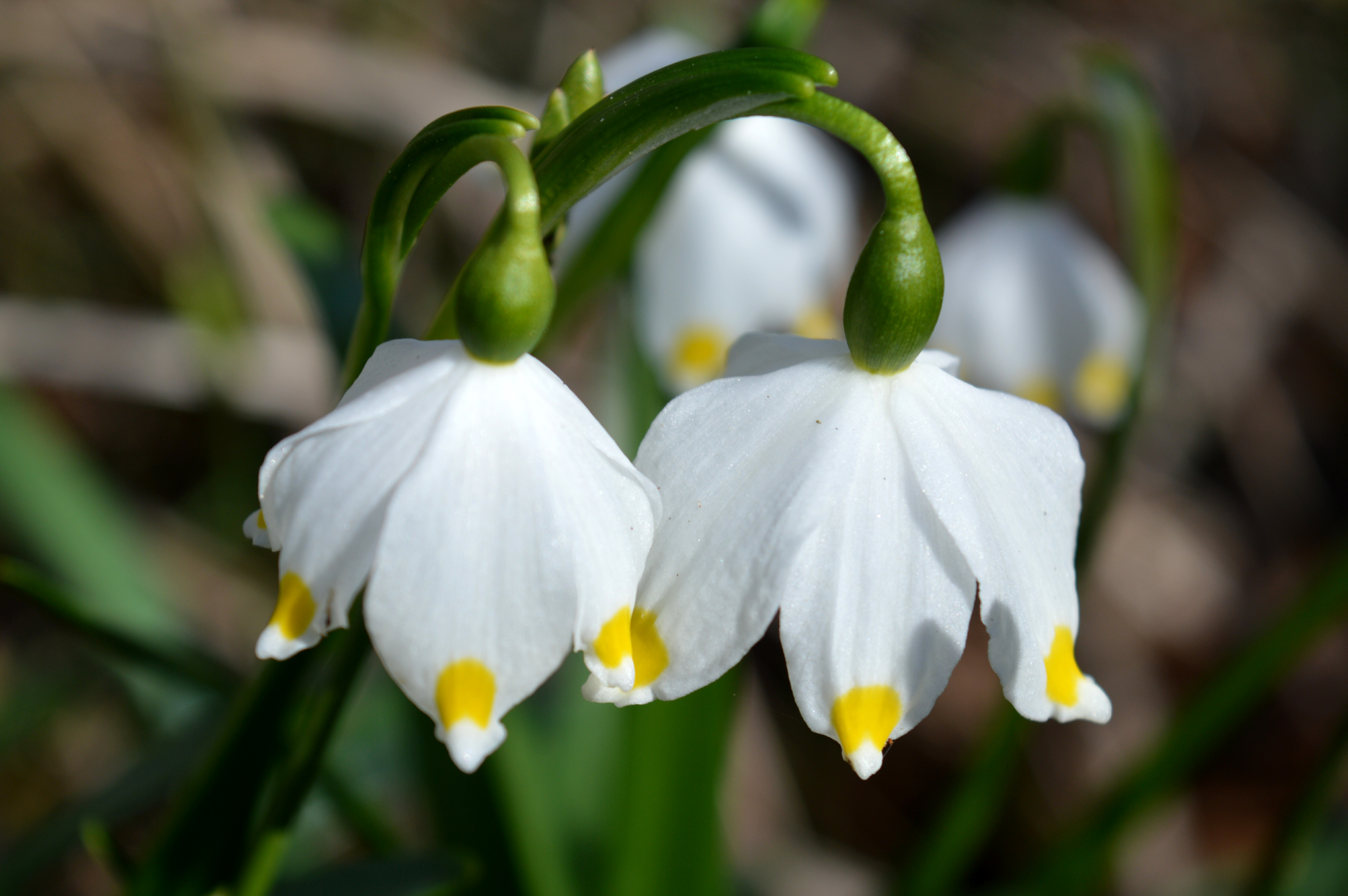
Leucojum vernum var. carpathicum, with yellow tepal marks rather than green

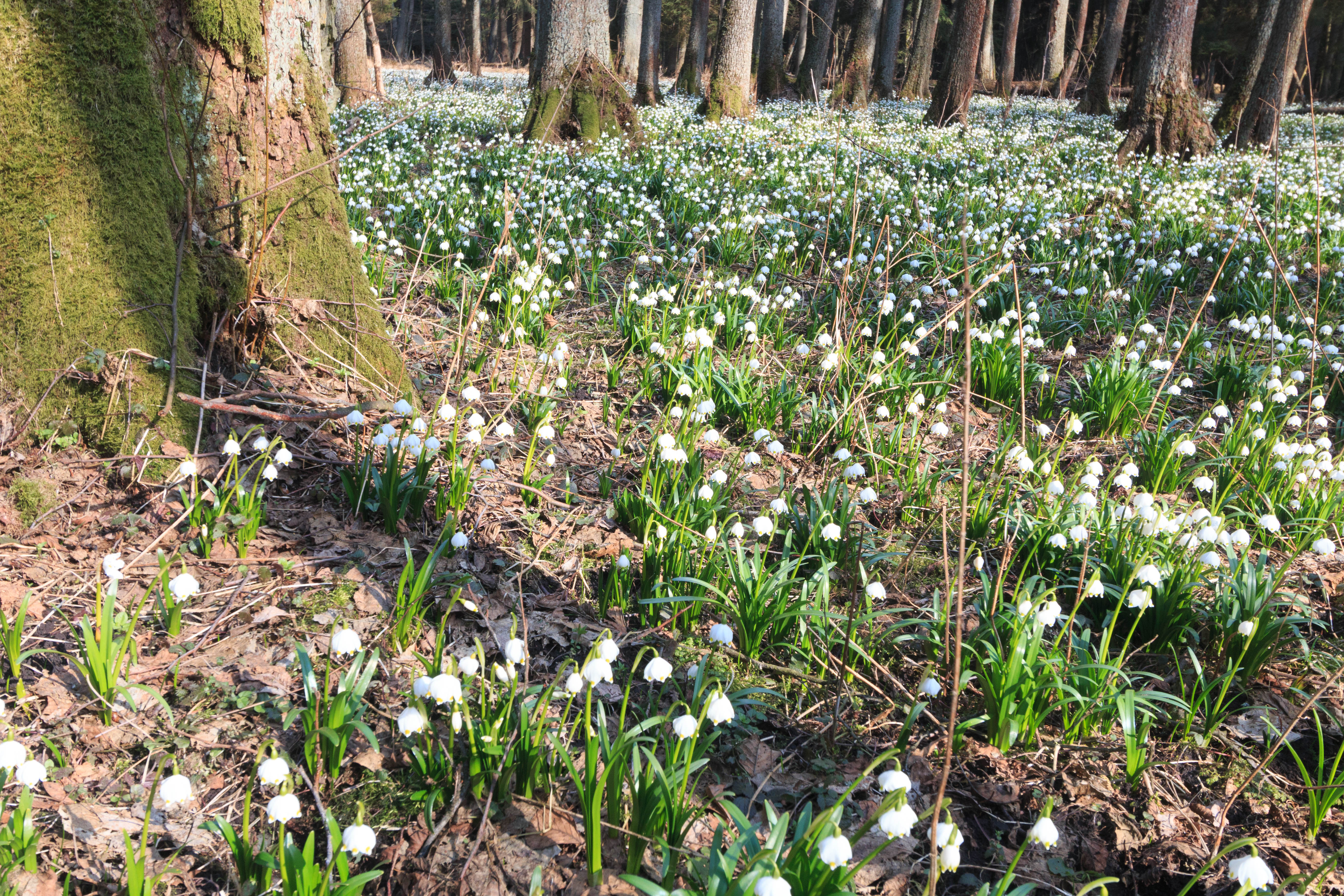
In typical damp forest habitat in the Králova Zahrada Nature Reserve, Czech Republic

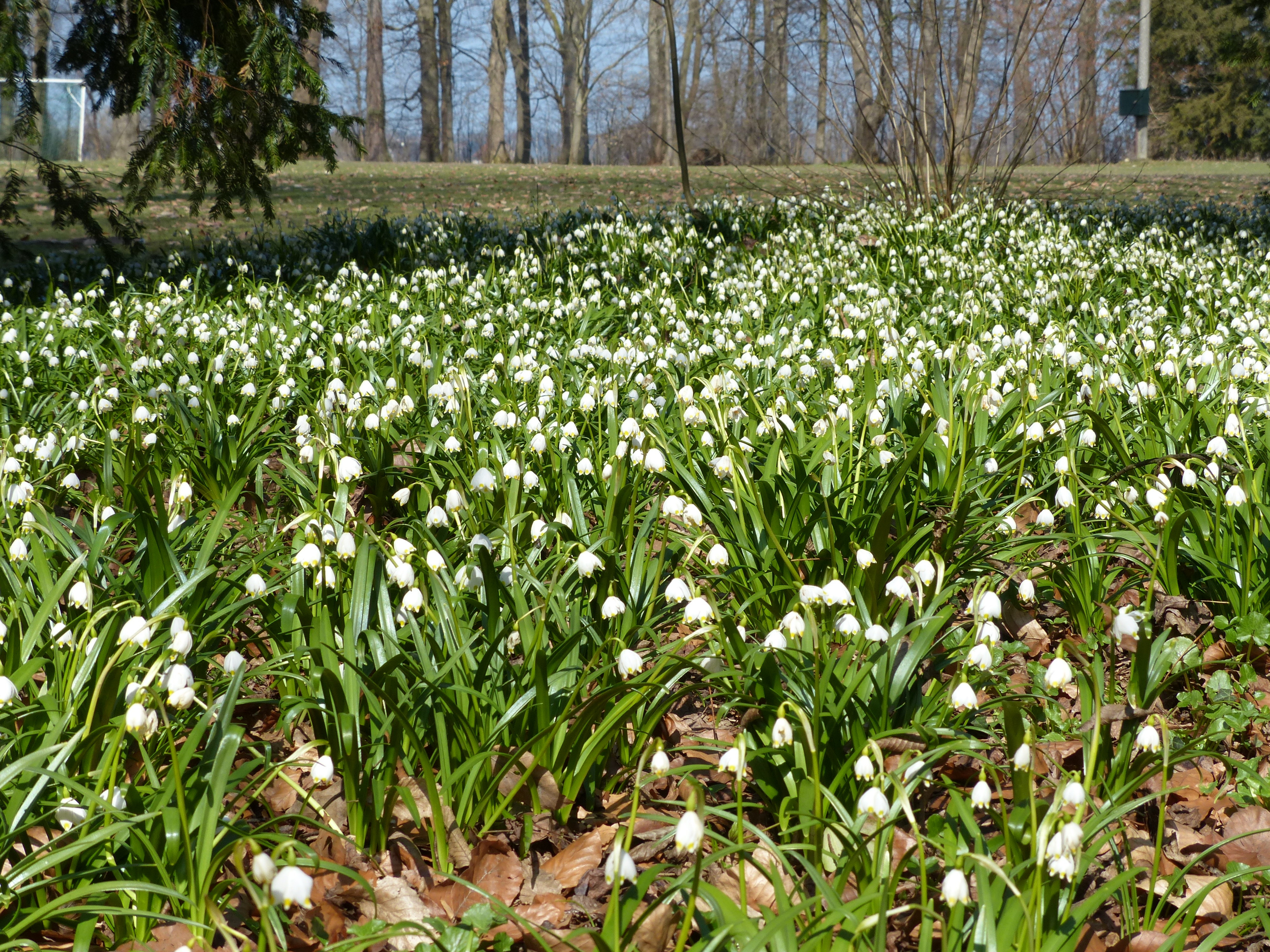
Naturalized in the Behrenhoff Landscape Park, Germany

== Taxonomy ==
Leucojum vernum was first described by Carl Linnaeus in 1753. The epithet vernum means "of the spring".

=== Varieties ===
Two varieties are accepted by the World Checklist of Selected Plant Families:

- Leucojum vernum var. carpathicum Sweet – Carpathian Mountains (Czech Republic, Slovakia, Romania, Ukraine, Poland)
- Leucojum vernum var. vernum

A third variety is recognized by some sources, but not by the World Checklist of Selected Plant Families:

- Leucojum vernum var. vagneri Stapf

Leucojum vernum var. carpathicum is distinguished by the presence of yellow rather than greenish markings at the tip of each tepal. Sources that distinguish var. vagneri from var. vernum describe it as more vigorous and flowering earlier, with two flowers per scape. It comes true from seed as it does not cross with var. vernum.

== Distribution and habitat ==
Leucojum vernum is native to central Europe and parts of southern and western Europe, including Austria, Belgium, the Czech Republic, Slovakia, Germany, Hungary, Poland, Switzerland, France, Italy, Romania, former Yugoslavia and Ukraine. It has become naturalized in other parts of Europe, including Great Britain, the Netherlands and parts of Scandinavia, and in Georgia and Florida in the United States. It is found in damp and shady habitats, including woods, up to elevations of 1,600 m (5,200 ft).

== Cultivation ==
Leucojum vernum is cultivated as an ornamental plant for its white flowers in spring. It is described as "easy to grow", either in sun or partial shade, particularly in moist soil and in grass. The species has gained the Royal Horticultural Society's Award of Garden Merit.

=== Cultivars ===
Many cultivars are available, including:

- 'Butter-churn' (L. vernum) – large yellowish flowers, one or two per stem, sometimes two fused together
- 'Eva Habermeier' (L. vernum) – yellow apical marks
- 'Gertrude Wister' (L. v. var. carpathicum) – semi-double
- 'Golden Bell' (L. v. var. carpathicum) – yellow ovary and tepal markings
- 'Green Lantern' (L. v. var. vernum) – vigorous, tepals about one-third green with a sharp apex
- 'Greengotts' (L. v. var. vagneri) – second earliest to flower, large apical green markings
- 'Hoch die Tassen' (L. v. var. vernum) – flowers face upwards (hoch die Tassen means 'raise your glasses')
- 'Janus' (L. v. var. vagneri) – flowers early, in the first week of January
- 'Klara' (L. v. var. carpathicum) – smaller stature, open, funnel-like flowers
- 'Lothar' (L. vernum) – long pedicels, up to three flowers per bulb
- 'Milly' (L. v. var. vernum) – one to six extra long, narrow, completely green tepals; comes true from seed
- 'Null Punkte' (L. v. var. vernum) – markings small or absent
- 'Podpolozje' (L. v. var. carpathicum) – large flowers with a large apical mark, mostly two flowers per stem
- 'Tentacular' (L. vernum) – double, green markings

== Toxicity ==
All species of Leucojum are poisonous as they contain the alkaloids lycorine and galantamine.
