= Z. robustus =

Z. robustus may refer to:

- Zaglossus robustus, an extinct long-beaked echidna species from the Pleistocene of Tasmania
- an incorrect abbreviation of Zephyranthes robusta, the pink fairy lily, pink rain lily, pink zephyr lily or pink magic lily, a plant species native to North America
