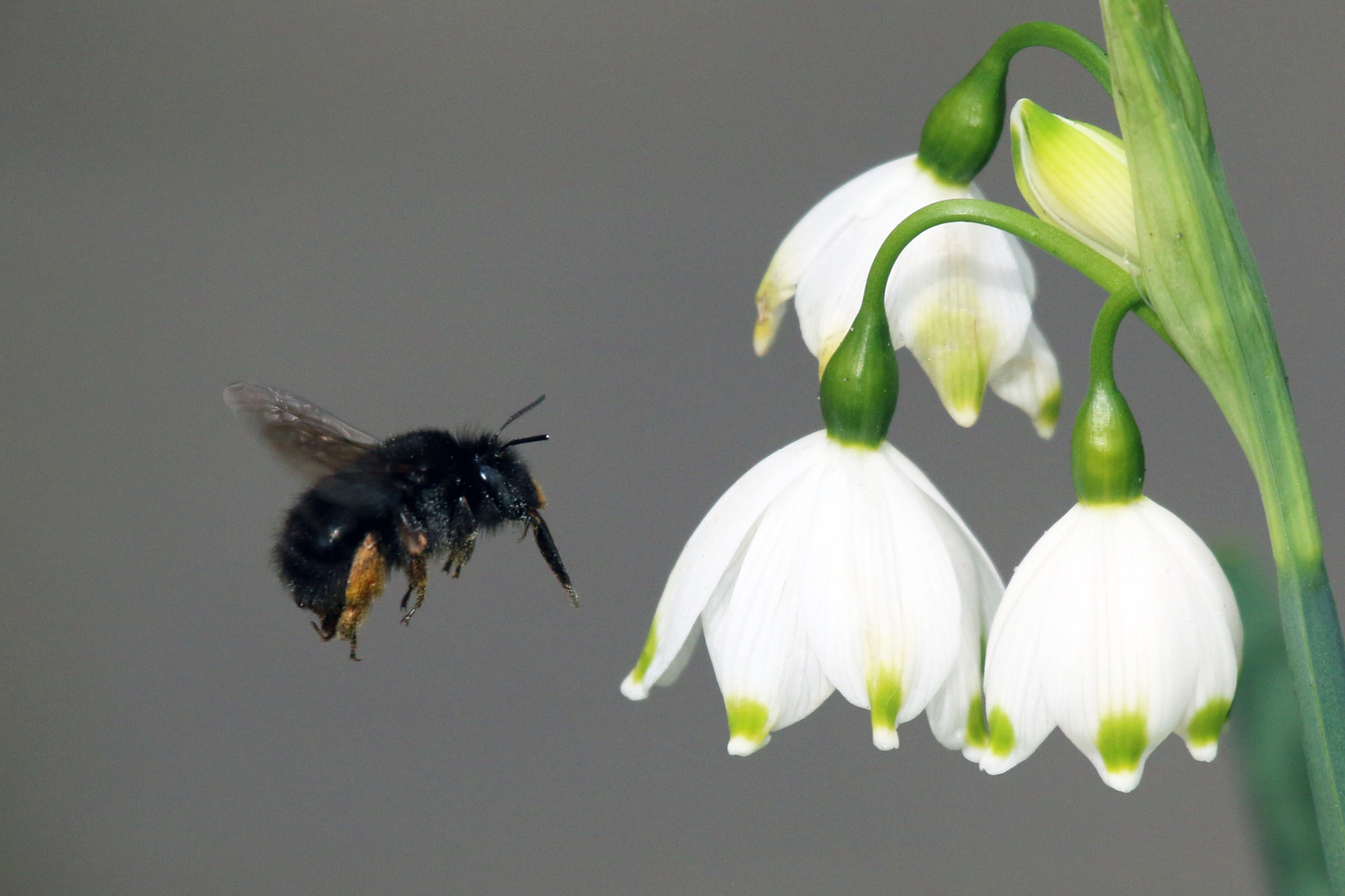
- Flowers of Leucojum aestivum with female hairy-footed flower bee (Anthophora plumipes)

Scientific classification
- Kingdom: Plantae
- Clade: Tracheophytes
- Clade: Angiosperms
- Clade: Monocots
- Order: Asparagales
- Family: Amaryllidaceae
- Subfamily: Amaryllidoideae
- Tribe: Galantheae
- Genus: Leucojum; L.

Synonyms
- Nivaria Heist. ex Fabr.; Narcissoleucojum Ortega; Erinosma Herb.; Polyanthemum Bubani

= Leucojum =

Genus of flowering plants

Leucojum is a small genus of bulbous plants native to Eurasia belonging to the amaryllis family, subfamily Amaryllidoideae. As currently circumscribed, the genus includes only two known species, most former species having been moved into the genus Acis. Both species are known as snowflakes.

Leucojum is a compound of Greek λευκος, leukos "white" and ἰόν, ion "violet". The spelling Leucoium is also used. In addition to the common name snowflakes, the two Leucojum species are also known as St. Agnes' flower, for the patron saint of virgins and gardeners, and snowbells.

== Description ==
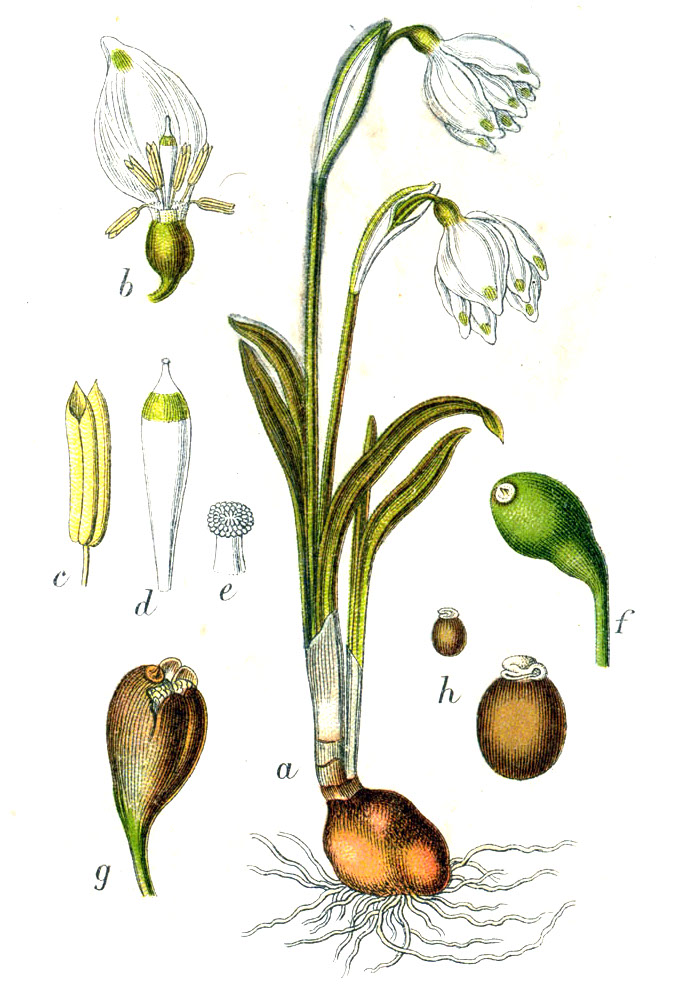
Leucojum vernum

Until 2004, the genus Leucojum was treated as including species now placed in Acis. Leucojum when narrowly circumscribed consists of only two species, Leucojum aestivum and Leucojum vernum. Compared to Acis, Leucojum has hollow rather than solid flower stalks (scapes), white flowers with green or yellow marks on both the inner and outer three tepals, flower stems (pedicels) at least as long as the spathes enclosing the inflorescence, and larger seeds, 5–7 mm (0.2–0.3 in) across. The marks at the tips of the tepals are quick way of distinguishing the genera when in flower. Like the related snowdrops (Galanthus), Leucojum has wider strap-shaped leaves rather than the usually narrowly filiform ones of Acis, 5–20 mm (0.2–0.8 in) wide in L. aestivum and up to 25 mm (1.0 in) wide in L. vernum.

== Taxonomy ==
The genus Leucojum was erected by Carl Linnaeus in 1753, initially for two species, Leucojum vernum and L. autumnale. In 1759, he added the species L. aestivum.

In 1807, Richard Anthony Salisbury illustrated two species in The Paradisus Londinensis. He initially used the name Leucojum autumnale for the plant illustrated in plate 21, but when discussing Leucojum pulchellum (now included in L. aestivum), illustrated in plate 74, Salisbury noted the differences between the two species, and considered them sufficient to move Leucojum autumnale into a new genus, Acis. Although some botanists accepted the split between Leucojum and Acis, including Robert Sweet in 1829, most did not; for example, Brian Mathew in 1987 placed all the species in Leucojum. Acis was reinstated in 2004, after it was determined on morphological and molecular grounds that the broadly defined genus Leucojum was paraphyletic, with Acis and a more narrowly defined Leucojum being related as shown the following cladogram.

- Galantheae
  - Acis
  - - Leucojum s.s.
    - Galanthus

Nine former members of the genus Leucojum, characterized by their narrow leaves, solid stems and unmarked flowers, are now placed in Acis, leaving only two species in Leucojum.

=== Species ===
- Leucojum aestivum L. – summer snowflake or Loddon lily – Europe, Middle East, Caucasus; naturalized in Japan, Australia, North America and Uruguay
- Leucojum vernum L. – spring snowflake – southern and central Europe from Spain to Ukraine; naturalised in Japan and parts of the US

== Distribution and habitat ==
Leucojum is native to Europe, except in the north-west, and then through Turkey to Iran. The two species, but particularly L. aestivum, are widely naturalized throughout the world, including in other parts of Europe, Japan, parts of Australia, North America and Uruguay. It prefers damp situations, such as wet meadows and ditches, and shady habitats, such as woods.

== Cultivation ==
The two species of Leucojum have been described as "tough garden plants for damp soils". Both grow well in gardens in western Europe, with sufficient rainfall so that the soil does not dry out completely in summer. L. aestivum, the summer snowflake, grows particularly well on clay soils. L. vernum, the spring snowflake, is easy to grow in moist sunny or semi-shady places and flowers along with snowdrops. Re-planting soon after lifting is recommended. Bulbs that have dried out either fail to grow or take a long time to establish. The plant can be propagated from seed as well as by division. Seeds require a period of cold in order to germinate and take 4–5 years to reach flowering size.

Bulbs may be attacked by the narcissus bulb fly (Merodon equestris). Flowers may be eaten by slugs and snails. Infection of the leaves by the fungus Peyronellaea curtisii (syn. Stagonospora curtisii) can also kill plants.

=== Cultivars ===
Leucojum aestivum 'Gravetye Giant' is a selected cultivar with larger flowers. It is named after Gravetye Manor, an Elizabethan manor house in West Sussex, England, the home of the influential garden writer William Robinson from 1884 until his death in 1935. The house is now a hotel.

Leucojum aestivum 'Gravetye Giant' and L. vernum have both gained the Royal Horticultural Society's Award of Garden Merit.

Leucojum vernum 'Podpolozje' is a robust cultivar which combines the properties of var. carpathicum with that of the variant "vagneri", i.e., two flowers per stem and yellowish spots on its tepals.

== Cultural importance ==
Leucojum aestivum was named the county flower of Berkshire following a 2002 survey by the wild flower and plant conservation charity Plantlife. It was once common in the Loddon Valley, hence its alternative name of the 'Loddon lily'.

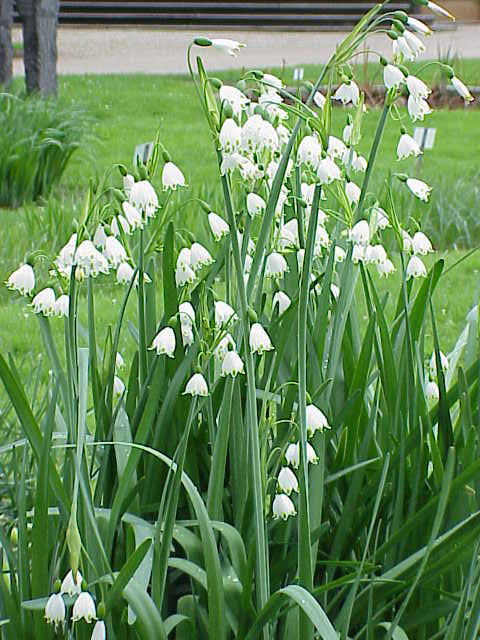
Summer snowflake (Leucojum aestivum)

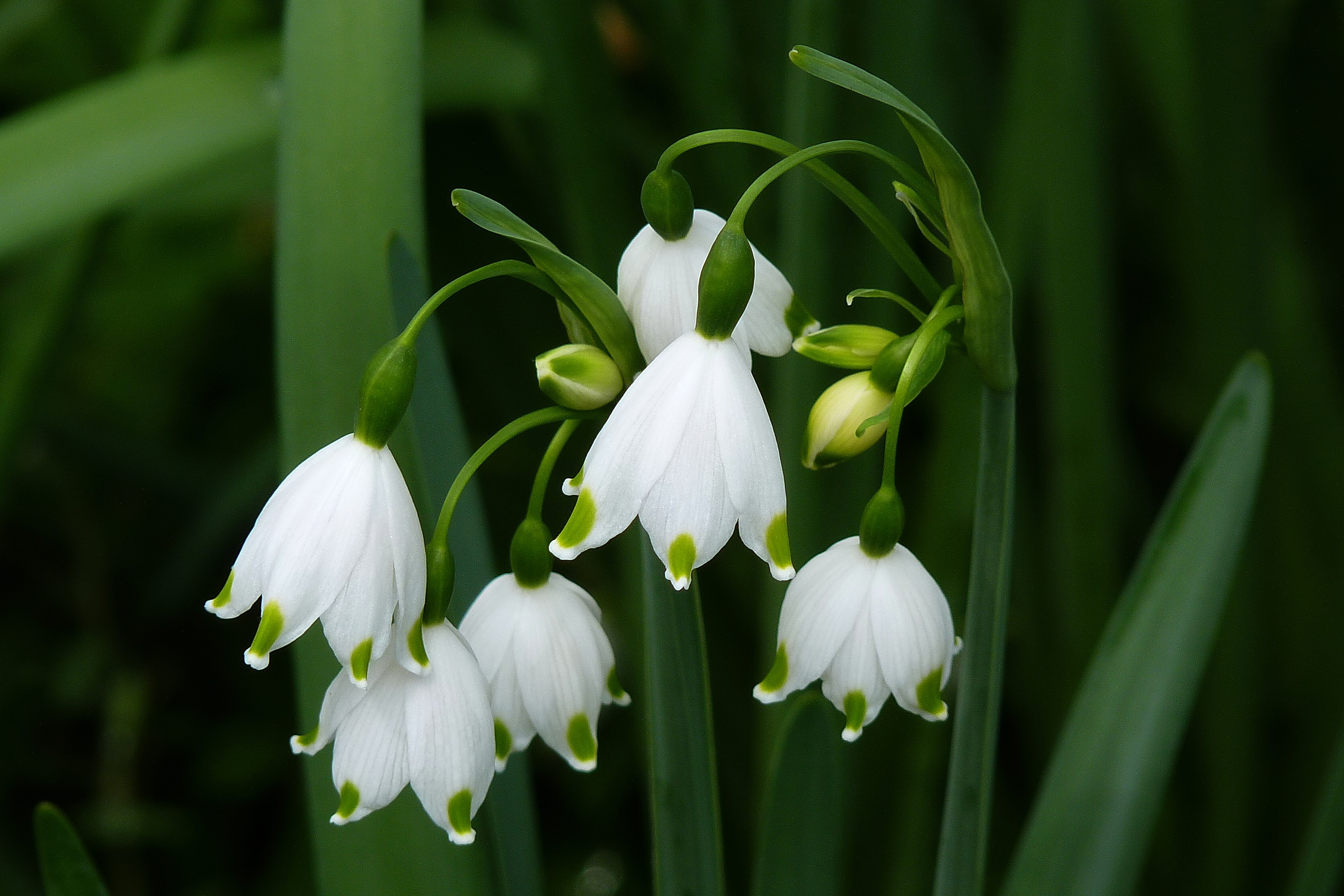
Summer snowflake (Leucojum aestivum)

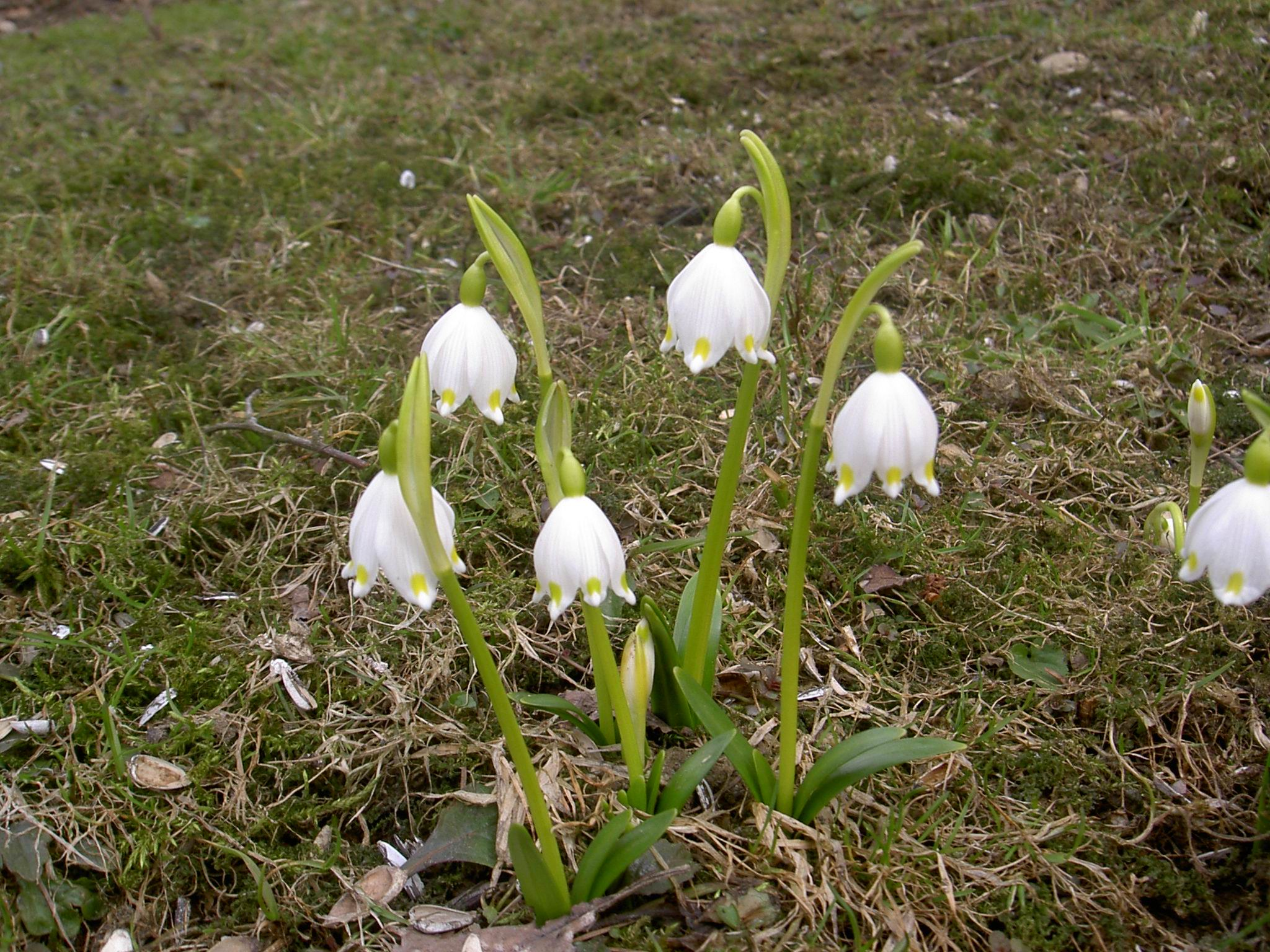
Spring snowflake (Leucojum vernum)

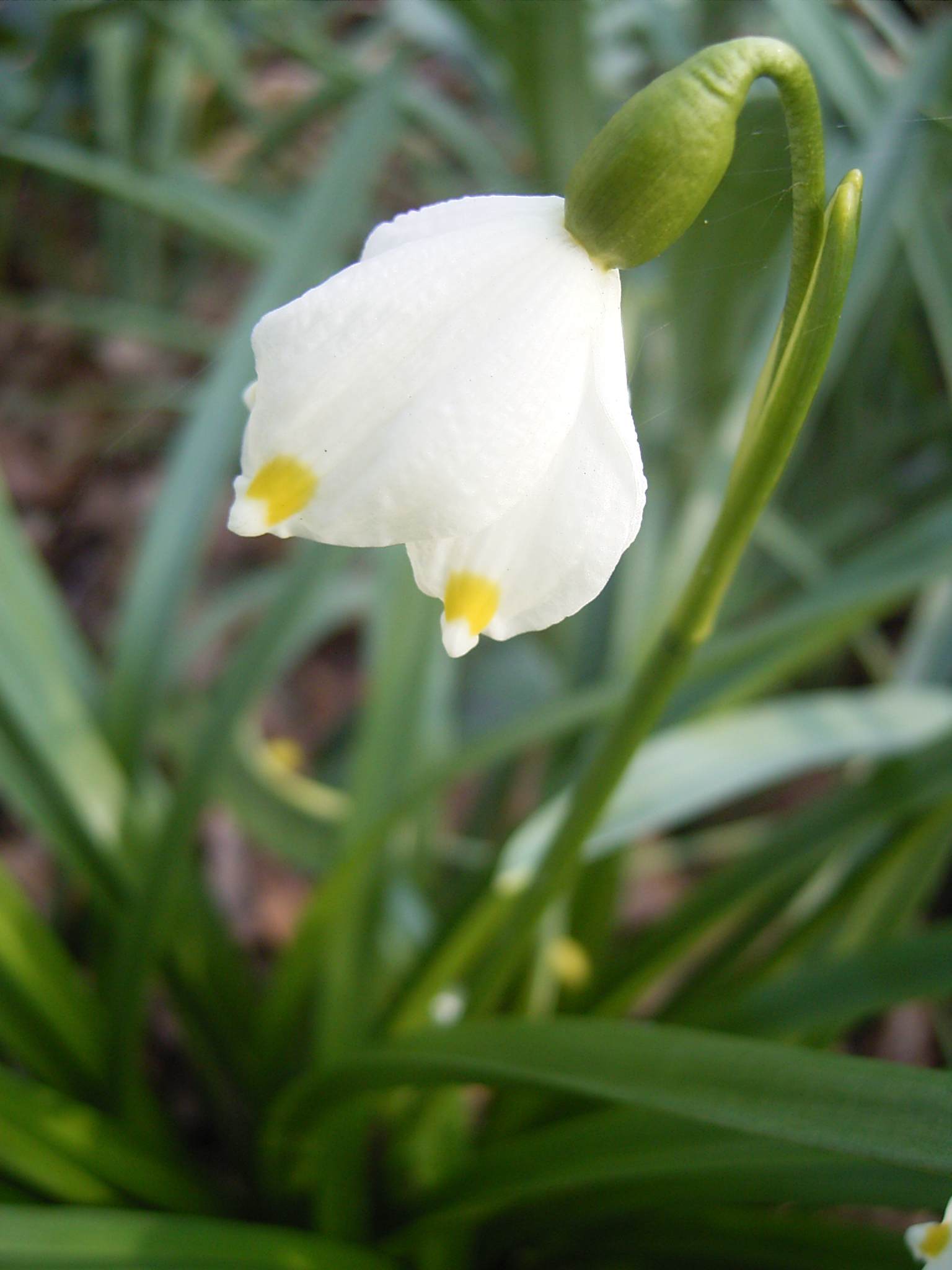
Flower of L. vernum var. carpathicum
