= Hamayne =

Names
- Systematic IUPAC name (3α,11R,13β)-1,2-Didehydrocrinan-3,11-diol
- Other names Bulbispermine

Identifiers
CAS Number	61948-11-6
3D model (JSmol)	Interactive image
ChEBI	CHEBI:31667
ChEMBL	ChEMBL3916492
ChemSpider	23327027
KEGG	C12164
PubChem CID	443670
CompTox Dashboard (EPA)	DTXSID90332125
- InChI: InChI=1S/C16H17NO4/c18-10-1-2-16-11-5-13-12(20-8-21-13)3-9(11)6-17(7-15(16)19)14(16)4-10/h1-3,5,10,14-15,18-19H,4,6-8H2/t10-,14-,15-,16+/m0/s1 Key: KWAOMPWGIIXDPH-BLQKSXIESA-N; InChI=1/C16H17NO4/c18-10-1-2-16-11-5-13-12(20-8-21-13)3-9(11)6-17(7-15(16)19)14(16)4-10/h1-3,5,10,14-15,18-19H,4,6-8H2/t10-,14-,15-,16+/m0/s1 Key: KWAOMPWGIIXDPH-BLQKSXIEBO
- SMILES: C1[C@H](C=C[C@@]23[C@H]1N(C[C@@H]2O)CC4=CC5=C(C=C34)OCO5)O

Properties
Chemical formula	C_{16}H_{17}NO_{4}
Molar mass	287.315 g·mol^{−1}
- Except where otherwise noted, data are given for materials in their standard state (at 25 °C [77 °F], 100 kPa). Infobox references

Hamayne is an alkaloid present in plants of the family Amaryllidaceae, including Iberian Narcissus species and two Nigerian Crinum species, reported to have acetylcholinesterase inhibitory activity. The product has been made via total synthesis as well.
