= Lycorine =

Names
- IUPAC name 3,12-Didehydro-2′H-[1,3]dioxolo[4′,5′:9,10]galanthan-1α,2β-diol
- Systematic IUPAC name (1S,2S,3a^{1}S,12bS)-2,3a^{1},4,5,7,12b-Hexahydro-1H,10H-[1,3]dioxolo[4,5-j]pyrrolo[3,2,1-de]phenanthridine-1,2-diol
- Other names Galanthidine, Amarylline, Narcissine, Licorine, Belamarine

Identifiers
CAS Number	476-28-8
3D model (JSmol)	Interactive image
ChEBI	CHEBI:6601
ChEMBL	ChEMBL400092
ChemSpider	65312
ECHA InfoCard	100.006.822
KEGG	C08532
PubChem CID	72378
UNII	I9Q105R5BU
CompTox Dashboard (EPA)	DTXSID60197208
- InChI: InChI=1S/C16H17NO4/c18-11-3-8-1-2-17-6-9-4-12-13(21-7-20-12)5-10(9)14(15(8)17)16(11)19/h3-5,11,14-16,18-19H,1-2,6-7H2/t11-,14-,15+,16+/m0/s1 Key: XGVJWXAYKUHDOO-DANNLKNASA-N; InChI=1/C16H17NO4/c18-11-3-8-1-2-17-6-9-4-12-13(21-7-20-12)5-10(9)14(15(8)17)16(11)19/h3-5,11,14-16,18-19H,1-2,6-7H2/t11-,14-,15+,16+/m0/s1 Key: XGVJWXAYKUHDOO-DANNLKNABD
- SMILES: O1c2c(OC1)cc3c(c2)[C@H]4[C@@H]/5N(C3)CCC\5=C/[C@H](O)[C@H]4O

Properties
Chemical formula	C_{16}H_{17}NO_{4}
Molar mass	287.315 g·mol^{−1}
- Except where otherwise noted, data are given for materials in their standard state (at 25 °C [77 °F], 100 kPa). verify (what is ?) Infobox references

Lycorine is a toxic crystalline alkaloid found in various Amaryllidaceae species, such as the cultivated bush lily (Clivia miniata), surprise lilies (Lycoris), and daffodils (Narcissus). It may be highly poisonous, or even lethal, when ingested in certain quantities. Regardless, it is sometimes used as a component in traditional medicines.

== Source ==
Lycorine is found in different species of Amaryllidaceae which include flowers and bulbs of daffodil, snowdrop (Galanthus) or spider lily (Lycoris). Lycorine is the most frequent alkaloid of Amaryllidaceae.

A 2014 research paper suggested that the earliest diversification of the Amaryllidaceae likely occurred in North Africa and the Iberian Peninsula. Furthermore, the study concluded that the biosynthetic pathway responsible for lycorine production is the oldest among the various toxin synthesis pathways found within the Amaryllidaceae.

== Mechanism of action ==
There is currently very little known about the mechanism of action of lycorine, although there have been some tentative hypotheses advanced concerning the metabolism of the alkaloid, based on experiments carried out upon beagle dogs.

Lycorine impedes protein synthesis in animal and fungal cells.

It is known that lycorine weakly inhibits acetylcholinesterase (AChE) and ascorbic acid biosynthesis. The IC50 of lycorine was found to vary between the different species it can be found in, but a common deduction from the experiments on lycorine was that it had some effect on inhibiting AChE.

Lycorine is a potent inhibitor of multiple human cancer cell lines.

Poisoning by lycorine most often occurs through the ingestion of daffodil bulbs. Daffodil bulbs are sometimes confused with white onions or other Allium species, leading to accidental poisoning.

In a study on beagle dogs, the first sign of nausea was observed at as little of a dose of 0.5 mg/kg and occurred within a 2.5 hour span. The effective dose to induce emesis in the dogs was seen to be 2.0 mg/kg and lasted no longer than 2.5 hours after administration.

Symptoms of lycorine exposure are variable but include vomiting, diarrhea, and convulsions.
