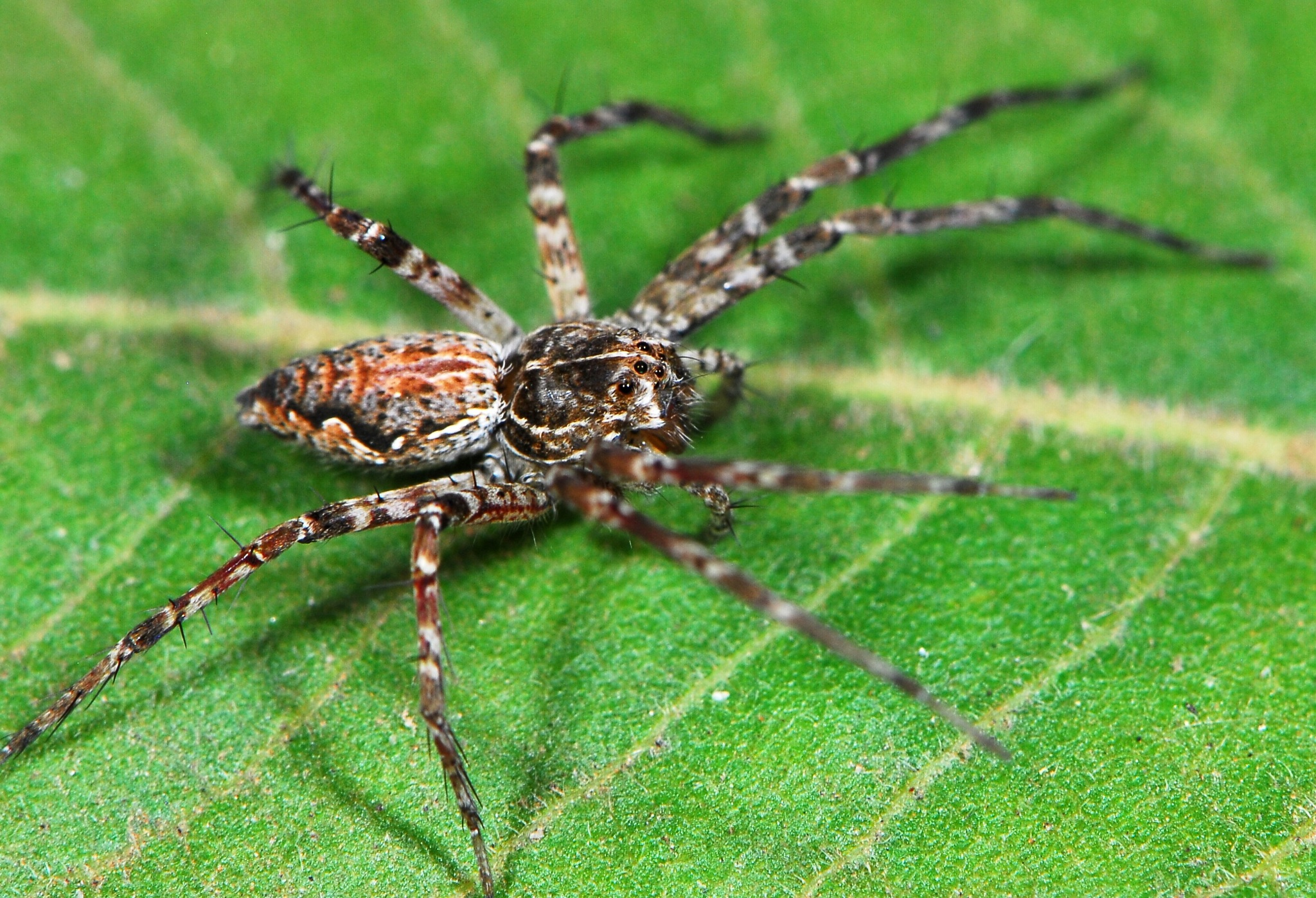
- female
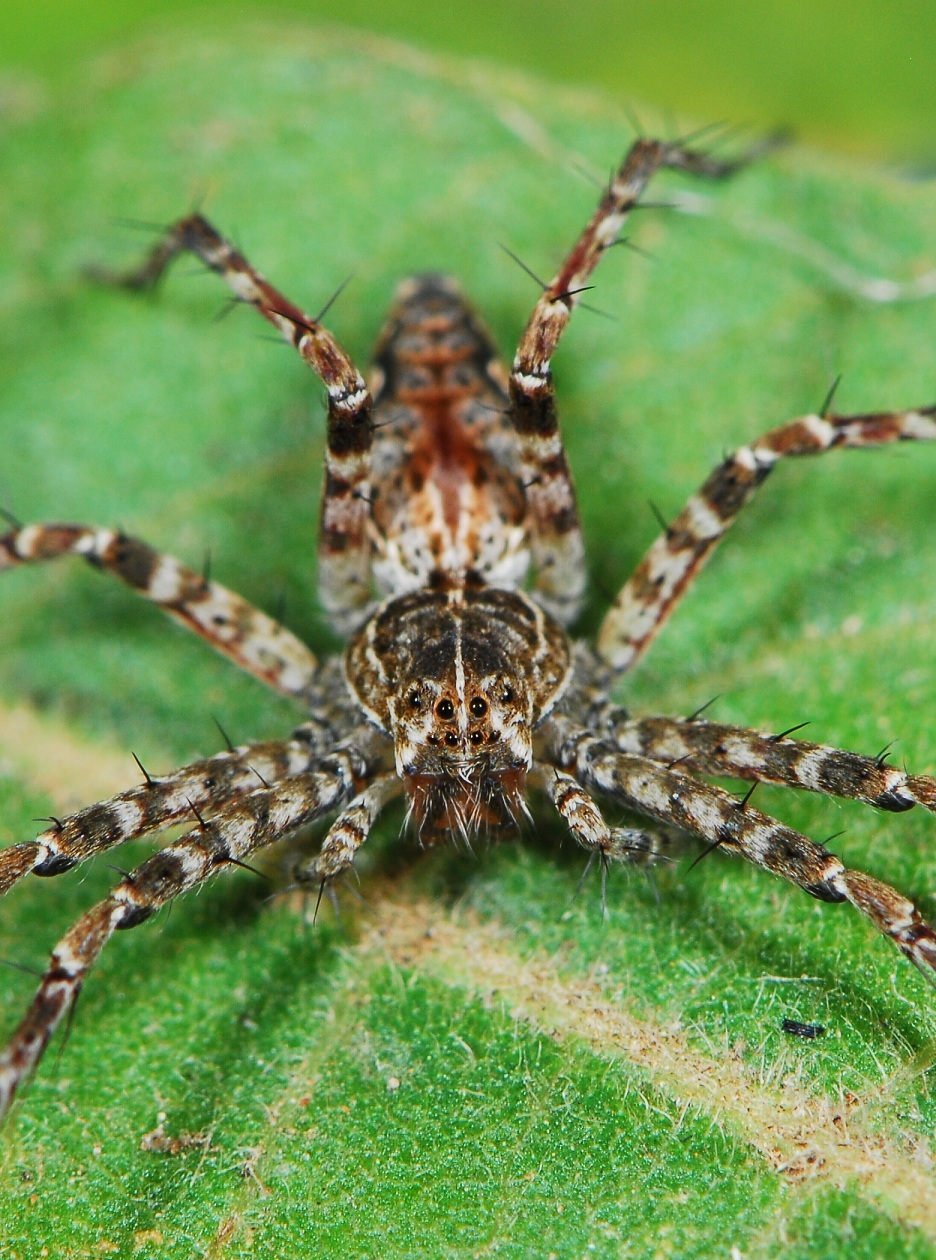
- female

Scientific classification
- Kingdom: Animalia
- Phylum: Arthropoda
- Subphylum: Chelicerata
- Class: Arachnida
- Order: Araneae
- Infraorder: Araneomorphae
- Family: Pisauridae
- Genus: Charminus
- Species: C. natalensis

Binomial name
- Charminus natalensis (Lawrence, 1947)

Synonyms
- Cispius natalensis Lawrence, 1947

= Charminus natalensis =

Natal Charminus nursery-web spider

Species of spider

Charminus natalensis is a species of spider in the family Pisauridae. It is endemic to South Africa and is commonly known as the Natal Charminus nursery-web spider.

== Distribution ==
Charminus natalensis is endemic to KwaZulu-Natal, where it has been sampled from several localities at altitudes ranging from 6 to 232 m.

Localities include iSimangaliso Wetland Park at Hell's Gate, Manguzi, Ndumo Game Reserve, Tembe Elephant Park, Umfolozi Nature Reserve at Umfolosi Drift, and Hluhluwe Nature Reserve.

== Habitat and ecology ==
The species is a free-living plant dweller commonly found in grasses, herbs and low-growing shrubs, especially in shaded areas. They are active at night and are easily sampled with sweep nets from the Forest and Savanna biomes.

== Description ==
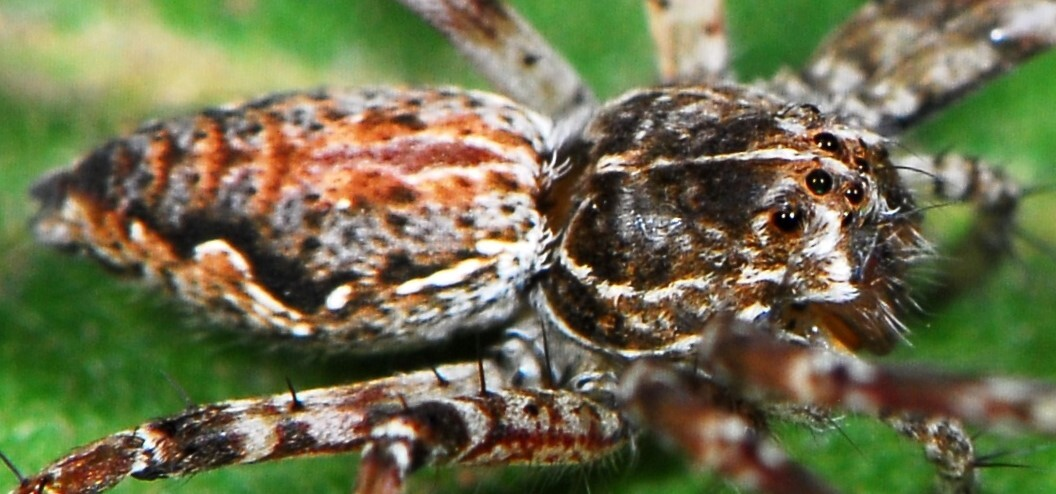
female

== Conservation ==
Charminus natalensis is listed as Least Concern. Although more sampling is needed to collect the male and to determine the species range, it is highly likely to be under collected and much natural habitat exists within its current range. The species is protected in Ndumo Game Reserve, Tembe Elephant Park, Umfolozi Nature Reserve and Hluhluwe Nature Reserve. There are no significant threats to the species.

== Etymology ==
The species name natalensis refers to Natal (now KwaZulu-Natal), where the species is endemic.

== Taxonomy ==
The species was originally described by Lawrence in 1947 as Cispius natalensis from Umfolosi Drift in KwaZulu-Natal. It was transferred to Charminus by Blandin in 1978. The species is known only from the female and has been revised by Blandin (1978).
