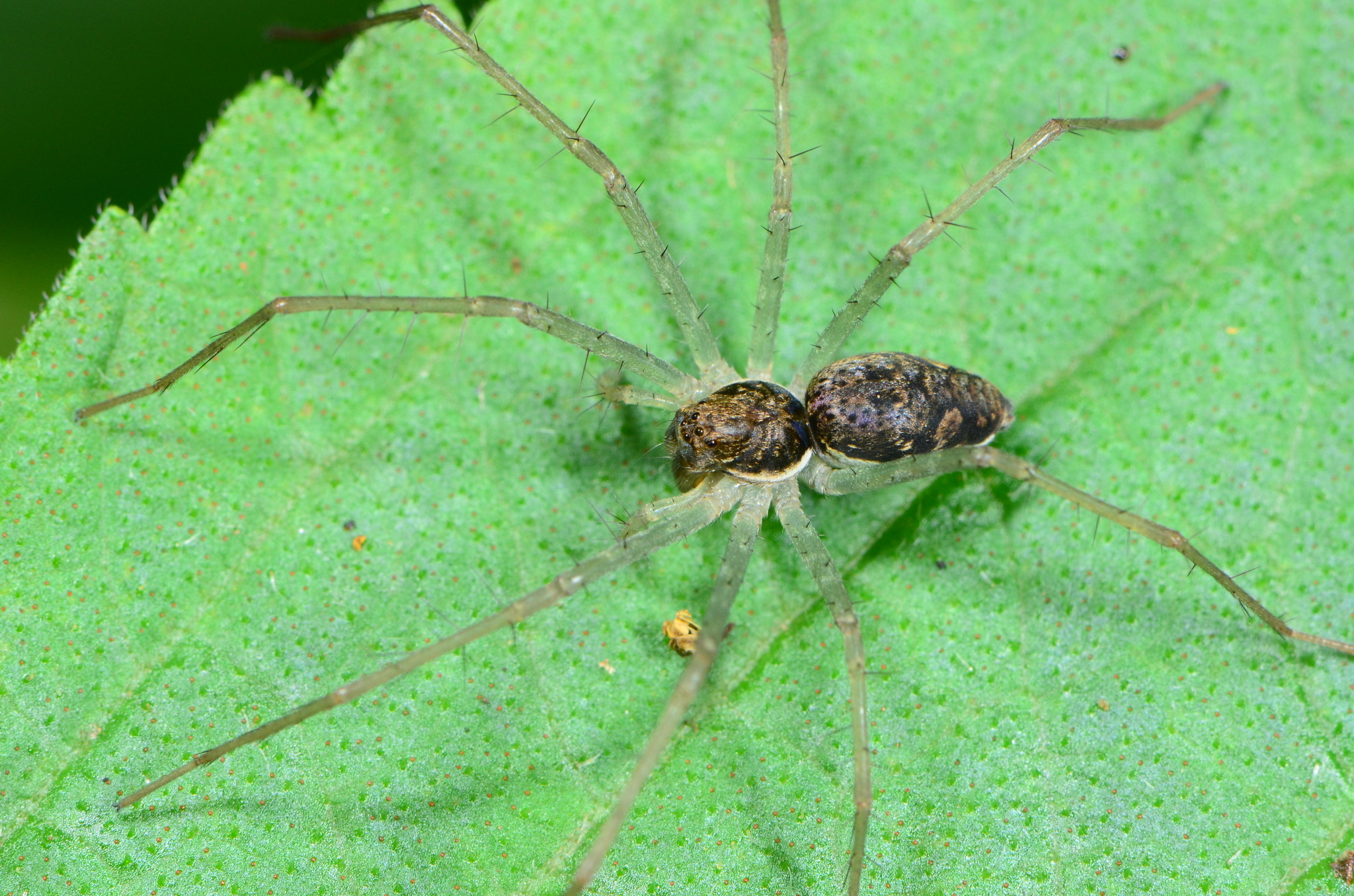
- female
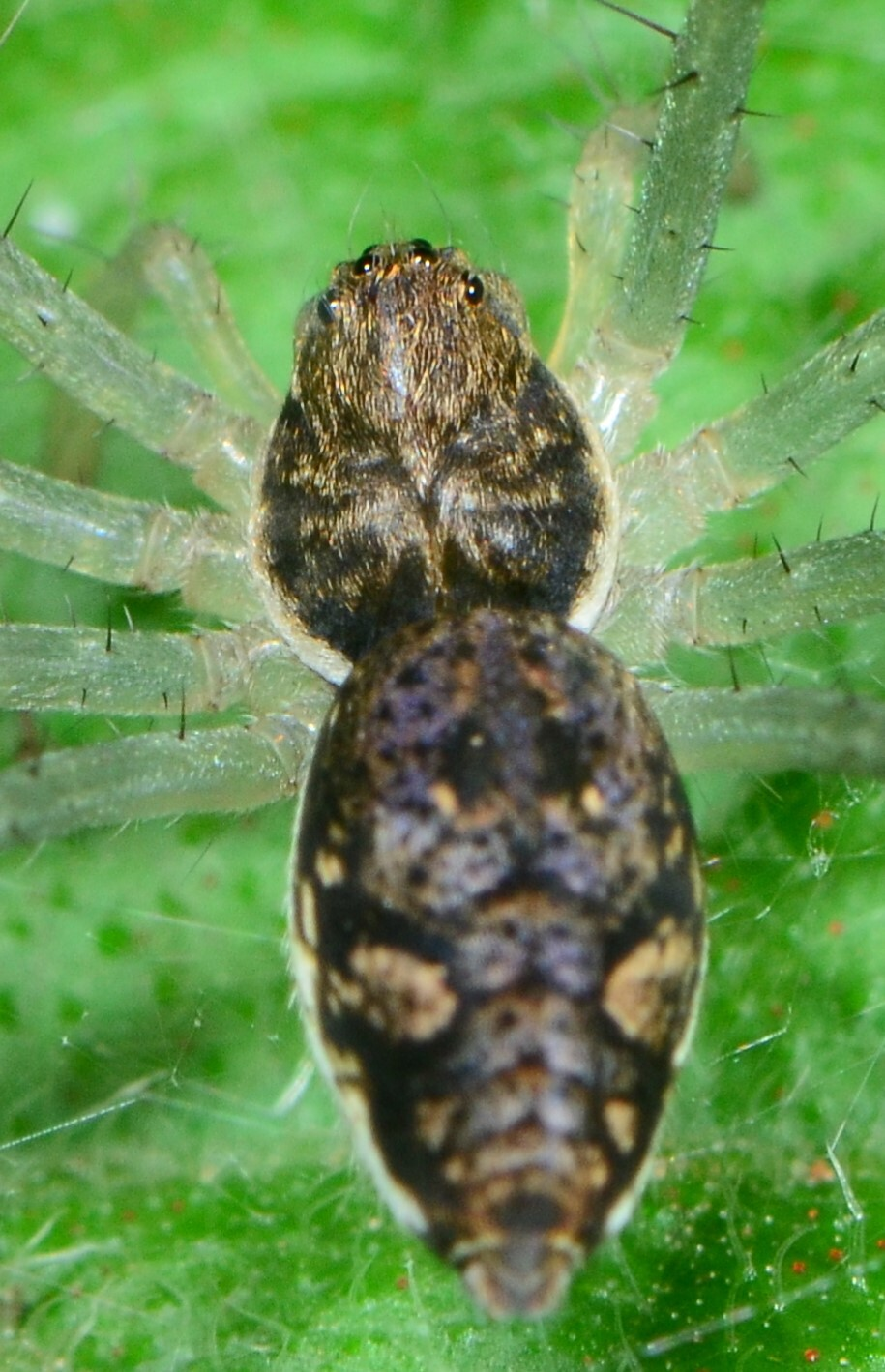
- female

Scientific classification
- Kingdom: Animalia
- Phylum: Arthropoda
- Subphylum: Chelicerata
- Class: Arachnida
- Order: Araneae
- Infraorder: Araneomorphae
- Family: Pisauridae
- Genus: Charminus
- Species: C. ambiguus

Binomial name
- Charminus ambiguus (Lessert, 1925)

= Charminus ambiguus =

Umbilo Charminus nursery-web spider

Species of spider

Charminus ambiguus is a species of spider in the family Pisauridae. It is found in three African countries and is commonly known as the Umbilo Charminus nursery-web spider.

== Distribution ==
Charminus ambiguus has been recorded from Tanzania, Malawi and South Africa. In South Africa, it has been recorded from two provinces at altitudes ranging from 22 to 1362 m.

South African localities include Richards Bay, Umbilo, Kloof and St. Lucia Wetland Park in KwaZulu-Natal, and multiple sites in Limpopo including Swadini Nature Reserve, Entabeni Nature Reserve, and Lekgalameetse Nature Reserve.

== Habitat and ecology ==
Specimens have been observed early in the morning when they run through and over grass with great rapidity, taking tremendous leaps. They disappear during the warmer parts of the day. They are sampled with sweep nets from the Savanna biome.

== Description ==
The species is recognized by its uniform brown grey carapace and abdomen dorsum with brown pattern, pale ventrally. The carapace has a white marginal band. The legs are pale. Unlike other Charminus species, C. ambiguus has equally-sized cheliceral teeth.

== Conservation ==
Charminus ambiguus is listed as Least Concern due to its wide geographical range. The species is protected in Swadini Nature Reserve, Entabeni Nature Reserve and Lekgalameetse Nature Reserve. There are no significant threats to the species.

== Etymology ==
The species name ambiguus is Latin for "ambiguous" or "doubtful".

== Taxonomy ==
The species was originally described by Lessert in 1925 as Cispius ambiguus from Umbilo in KwaZulu-Natal. It was transferred to Charminus by Blandin in 1978. The species is known from both sexes and has been revised by Blandin (1978).
