= Charminus atomarius =

Umhlali Charminus nursery-web spider

Scientific classification
- Kingdom: Animalia
- Phylum: Arthropoda
- Subphylum: Chelicerata
- Class: Arachnida
- Order: Araneae
- Infraorder: Araneomorphae
- Family: Pisauridae
- Genus: Charminus
- Species: C. atomarius

Binomial name
- Charminus atomarius (Lawrence, 1942)

Synonyms
- Cispius atomarius Lawrence, 1942; Cispius quadrimaculatus Roewer, 1955

Species of spider

Charminus atomarius is a species of spider in the family Pisauridae. It is found in four African countries and is commonly known as the Umhlali Charminus nursery-web spider.

== Distribution ==
Charminus atomarius has been recorded from the Democratic Republic of the Congo, Mozambique, Tanzania and South Africa.

In South Africa, it has been recorded from two provinces at altitudes ranging from 43 to 839 m.

South African localities include Ndumo Game Reserve, Tembe Elephant Park, Pietermaritzburg, Umhlali, Ithala Nature Reserve and uMkhuze Game Reserve in KwaZulu-Natal, and Hoedspruit in Limpopo.

== Habitat and ecology ==
The species is found inhabiting grasses, herbs and low-growing shrubs, especially in shaded areas. They are active at night and are usually sampled with sweep nets from the Savanna biome.

== Description ==
The legs are pale and lightly banded. The abdomen has a dark pattern bordered by white, sometimes with a pair of white spots. The carapace has a median pale band bordered by two darker bands.

== Conservation ==
Charminus atomarius is listed as Least Concern due to its wide geographical range. The species is protected in Ndumo Game Reserve, Tembe Elephant Park, Ithala Nature Reserve and uMkhuze Game Reserve. There are no significant threats to the species.

== Taxonomy ==
The species was originally described by Lawrence in 1942 as Cispius atomarius from Umhlali in KwaZulu-Natal. It was transferred to Charminus by Blandin in 1978, who also synonymized Cispius quadrimaculatus Roewer, 1955 with this species. The species is known from both sexes and has been revised by Blandin (1978).
