= Cispius problematicus =

Zaire Cispius nursery-web spider

Scientific classification
- Kingdom: Animalia
- Phylum: Arthropoda
- Subphylum: Chelicerata
- Class: Arachnida
- Order: Araneae
- Infraorder: Araneomorphae
- Family: Pisauridae
- Genus: Cispius
- Species: C. problematicus

Binomial name
- Cispius problematicus Blandin, 1978

Species of spider

Cispius problematicus is a species of spider in the family Pisauridae. It is found in the Democratic Republic of the Congo, Eswatini and South Africa, and is commonly known as the Zaire Cispius nursery-web spider.

== Distribution ==
Cispius problematicus has been recorded from the Democratic Republic of the Congo, Eswatini and South Africa.

In South Africa, it has been recorded from two provinces at altitudes ranging from 116 to 1412 m.

South African localities include Klaserie Game Reserve, Kruger National Park and Luvhondo Nature Reserve in Limpopo, and several Kruger National Park sites in Mpumalanga.

== Habitat and ecology ==
The species constructs a funnel-like web in short shrubs and bushes close to the ground or in trees. The capture web is sheet-like and composed of dense criss-crossing threads. At one end the web is drawn into a long funnel that descends into the base of a plant.

The species has been sampled from the Savanna biome.

== Conservation ==
Cispius problematicus is listed as Least Concern. Although the species is presently known only from one sex, it has a wide geographical range. The species is protected in Kruger National Park and Luvhondo Nature Reserve. There are no significant threats to the species.

== Taxonomy ==
The species was described by Blandin in 1978 from the Democratic Republic of the Congo. It is known only from the male.
