= Charminus aethiopicus =

East Africa Charminus nursery-web spider

Scientific classification
- Kingdom: Animalia
- Phylum: Arthropoda
- Subphylum: Chelicerata
- Class: Arachnida
- Order: Araneae
- Infraorder: Araneomorphae
- Family: Pisauridae
- Genus: Charminus
- Species: C. aethiopicus

Binomial name
- Charminus aethiopicus (Caporiacco, 1939)

Synonyms
- Cispius tertalei Caporiacco, 1941; Cispius novus Caporiacco, 1941

Species of spider

Charminus aethiopicus is a species of spider in the family Pisauridae. It is found in several African countries and is commonly known as the East Africa Charminus nursery-web spider.

== Distribution ==
Charminus aethiopicus has been recorded from eleven African countries, including Ethiopia, Kenya and South Africa. In South Africa, it has been recorded from two provinces at altitudes ranging from 131 to 677 m.

South African localities include sites in Kruger National Park in Limpopo and Nelspruit, Lowveld National Botanical Garden, and several Kruger National Park sites in Mpumalanga.

== Habitat and ecology ==
Charminus species are commonly found inhabiting grasses, herbs and low-growing shrubs, especially in shaded areas. They are sampled with sweep nets from the Savanna biome.

== Conservation ==
Charminus aethiopicus is listed as Least Concern due to its wide geographical range. In South Africa, it is protected in Kruger National Park and Lowveld National Botanical Garden. There are no significant threats to the species.

== Etymology ==
The species name aethiopicus refers to Ethiopia, where the species was first described.

== Taxonomy ==
The species was originally described by Caporiacco in 1939 as Cispius aethiopicus from Ethiopia. It was transferred to Charminus by Sierwald in 1997, who also synonymized Cispius novus and C. tertalei (both Caporiacco, 1941) with this species. The species is known from both sexes and has been revised by Sierwald (1997).
