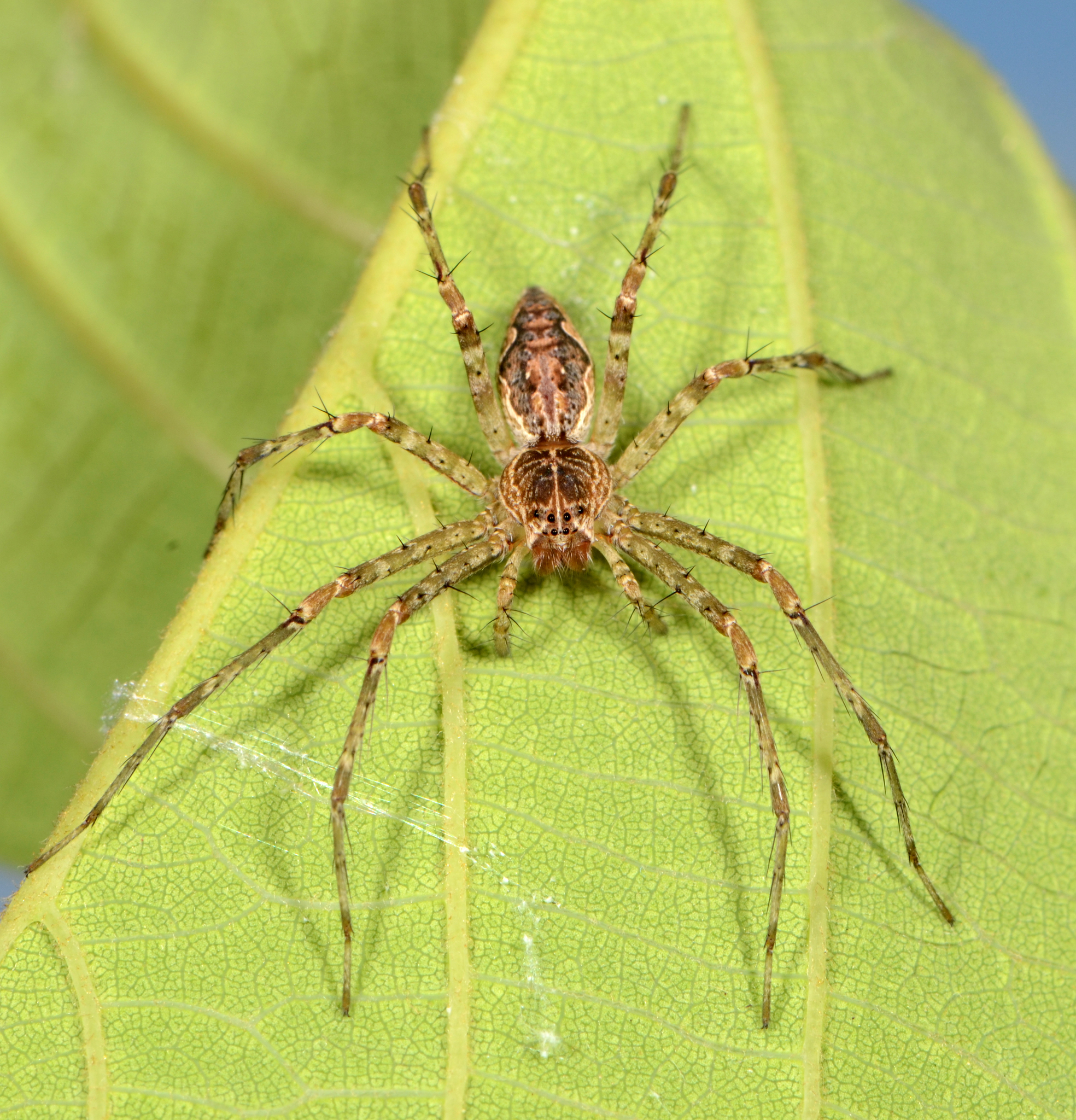
- female C. atomarius
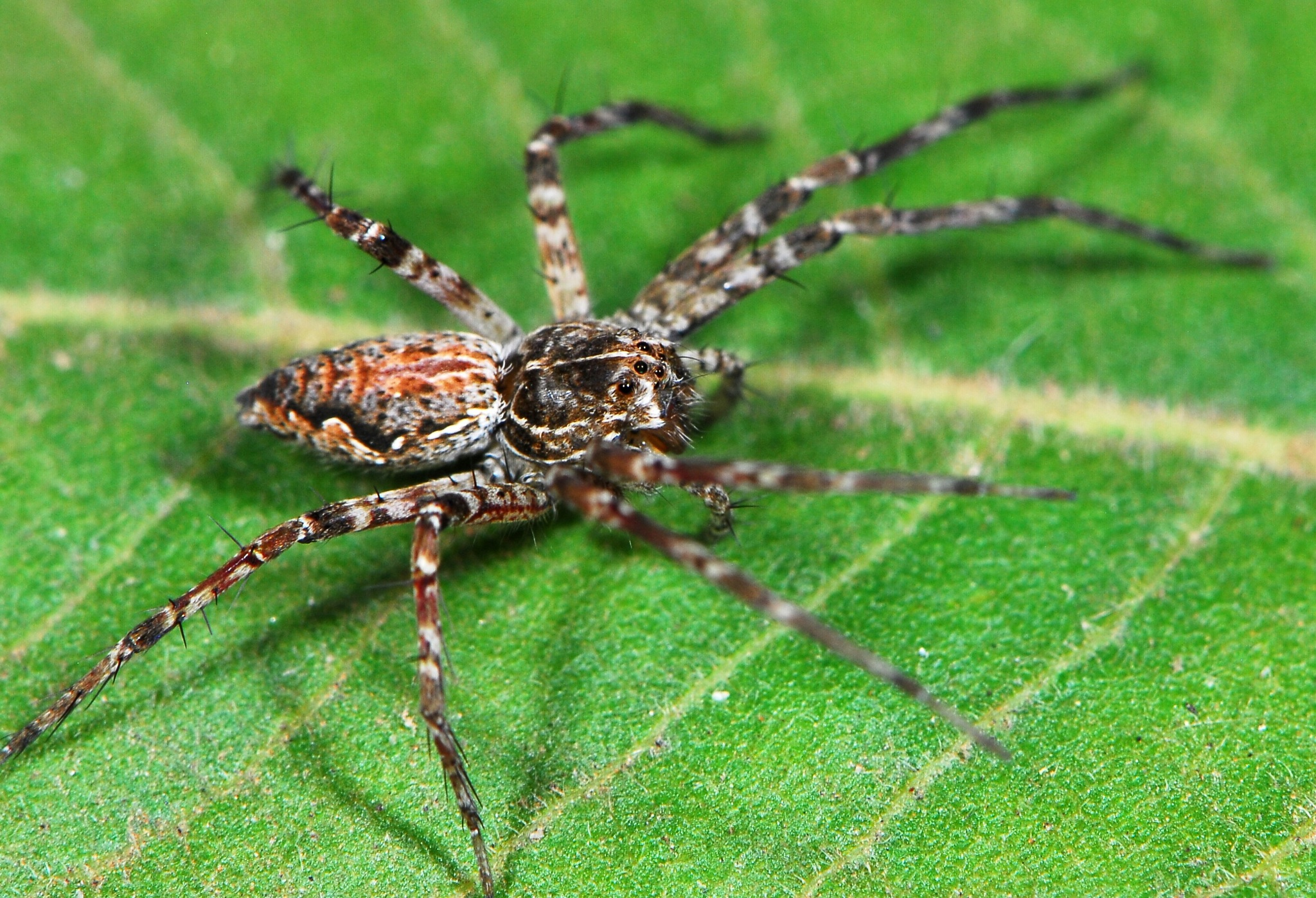
- female C. natalensis

Scientific classification
- Kingdom: Animalia
- Phylum: Arthropoda
- Subphylum: Chelicerata
- Class: Arachnida
- Order: Araneae
- Infraorder: Araneomorphae
- Family: Pisauridae
- Genus: Charminus; Thorell, 1899

Type species
- C. camerunensis Thorell, 1899

Species
- 9, see text

= Charminus =

Genus of spiders

Charminus is a genus of nursery web spiders that was first described by Tamerlan Thorell in 1899.

== Description ==
Charminus species have a total body size of 7.8 to 9.7 mm for both females and males. Females are slightly larger than males, but males have longer legs. The carapace is longer than wide and narrower in the eye region. Both eye rows are recurved, with the anterior row only slightly shorter than the posterior row. The anterior eyes are slightly smaller than the posterior eyes.

The chelicerae typically bear three cheliceral teeth, though some individuals have four. The teeth are unequal in size, except in Charminus ambiguus where they are equally sized. The abdomen is oval. The legs are pale or banded. In males, the palp has a long, whip-like embolus, and the retrolateral tibial apophysis is simple, perpendicular, and pointed at the tip.

== Taxonomy ==
The genus Charminus was described by Thorell in 1899. It has been revised by Blandin (1978) and Sierwald (1997). The genus is morphologically very similar to Cispius.

== Species ==
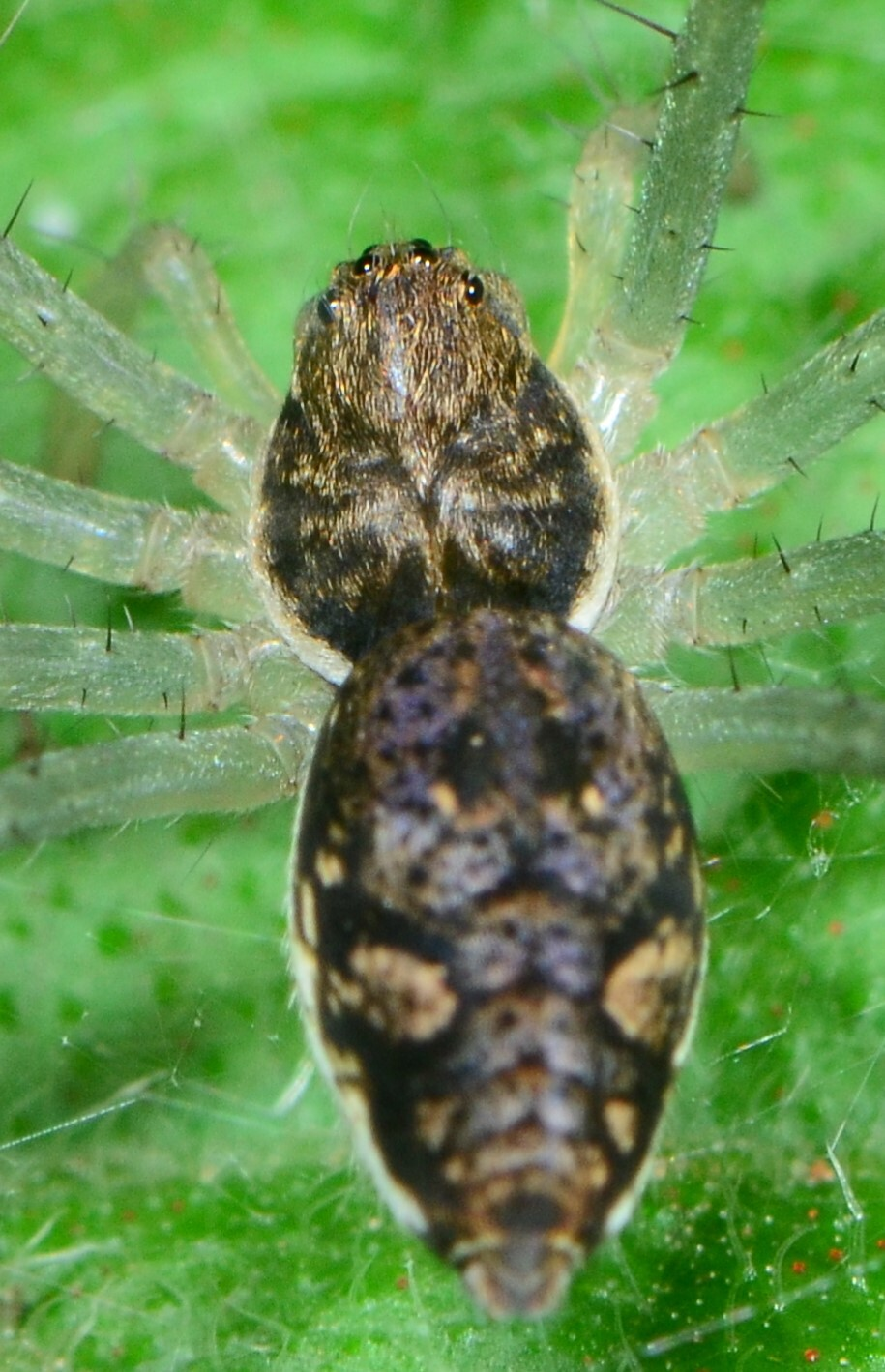
female C. ambiguus

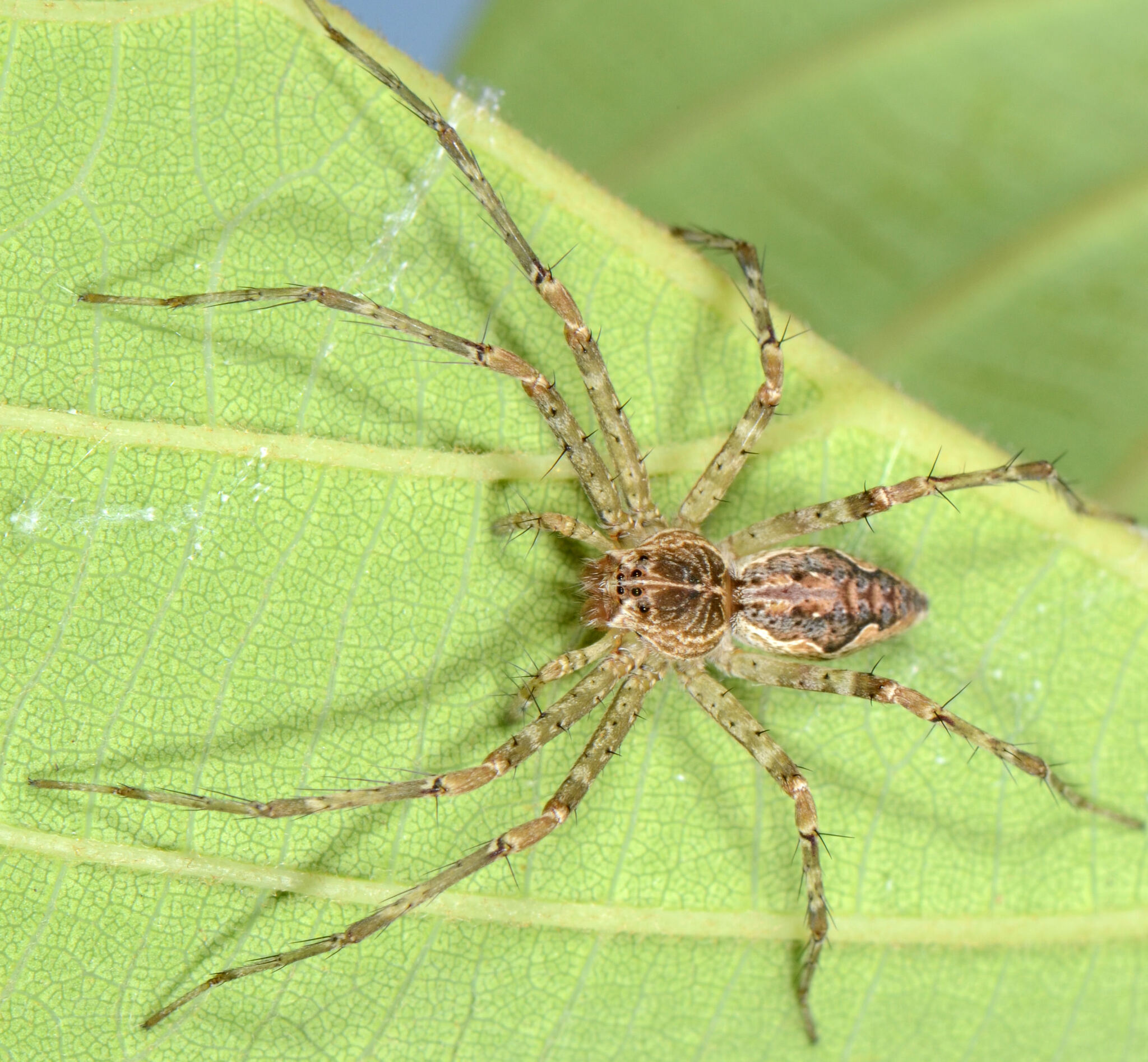
female C. atomarius

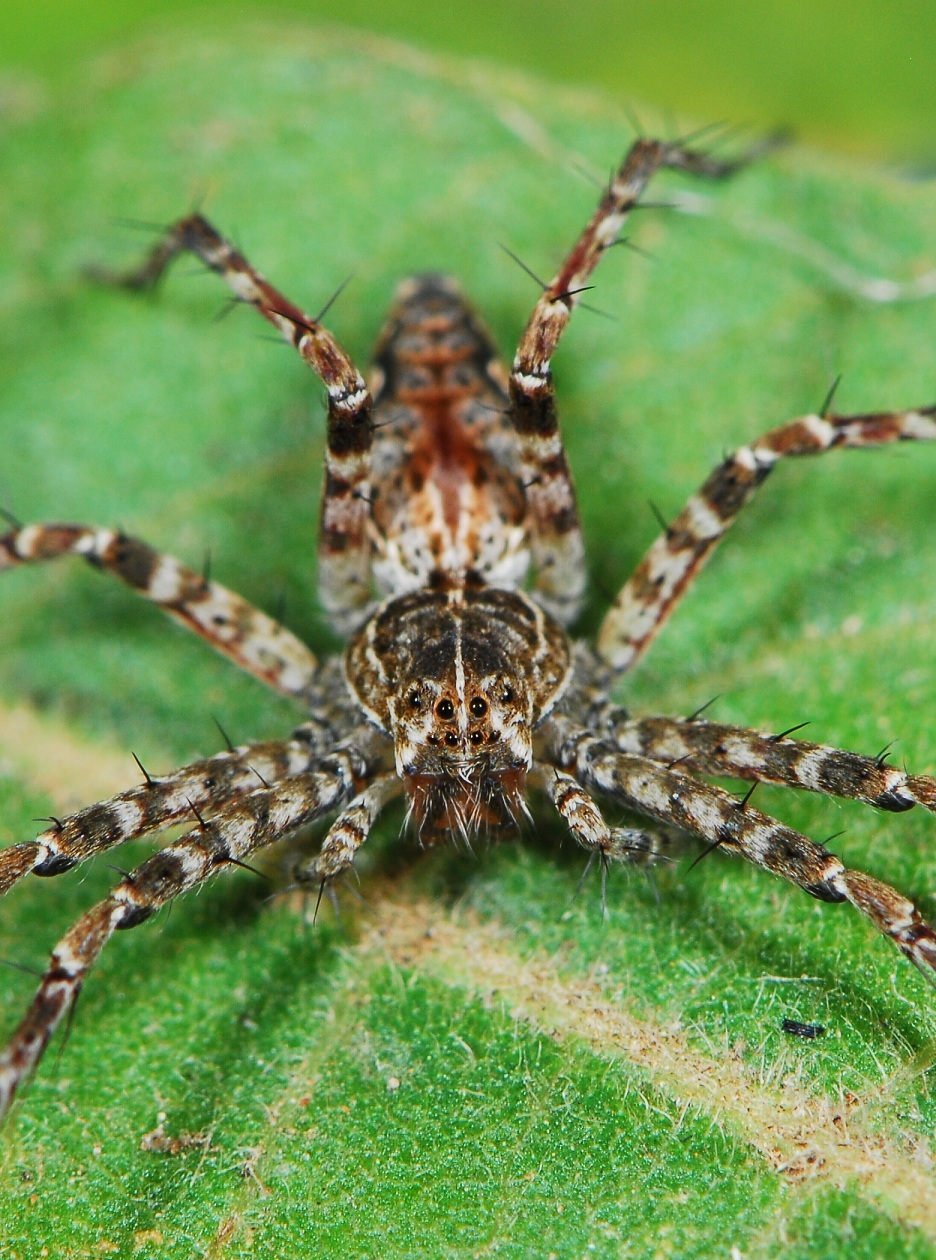
female C. natalensis

As of October 2025, this genus includes nine species and one subspecies:

- Charminus aethiopicus (Caporiacco, 1939) – Ethiopia, Kenya, South Africa
- Charminus ambiguus (Lessert, 1925) – Tanzania, Malawi, South Africa
  - C. a. concolor (Caporiacco, 1947) – Tanzania
- Charminus atomarius (Lawrence, 1942) – DR Congo, Tanzania, Mozambique, South Africa
- Charminus bifidus Blandin, 1978 – Rwanda
- Charminus camerunensis Thorell, 1899 – Ivory Coast, Togo, Cameroon, DR Congo, Rwanda (type species)
- Charminus marfieldi (Roewer, 1955) – Ivory Coast, Cameroon, DR Congo
- Charminus minor (Lessert, 1928) – Ivory Coast, DR Congo
- Charminus natalensis (Lawrence, 1947) – South Africa
- Charminus rotundus Blandin, 1978 – DR Congo
