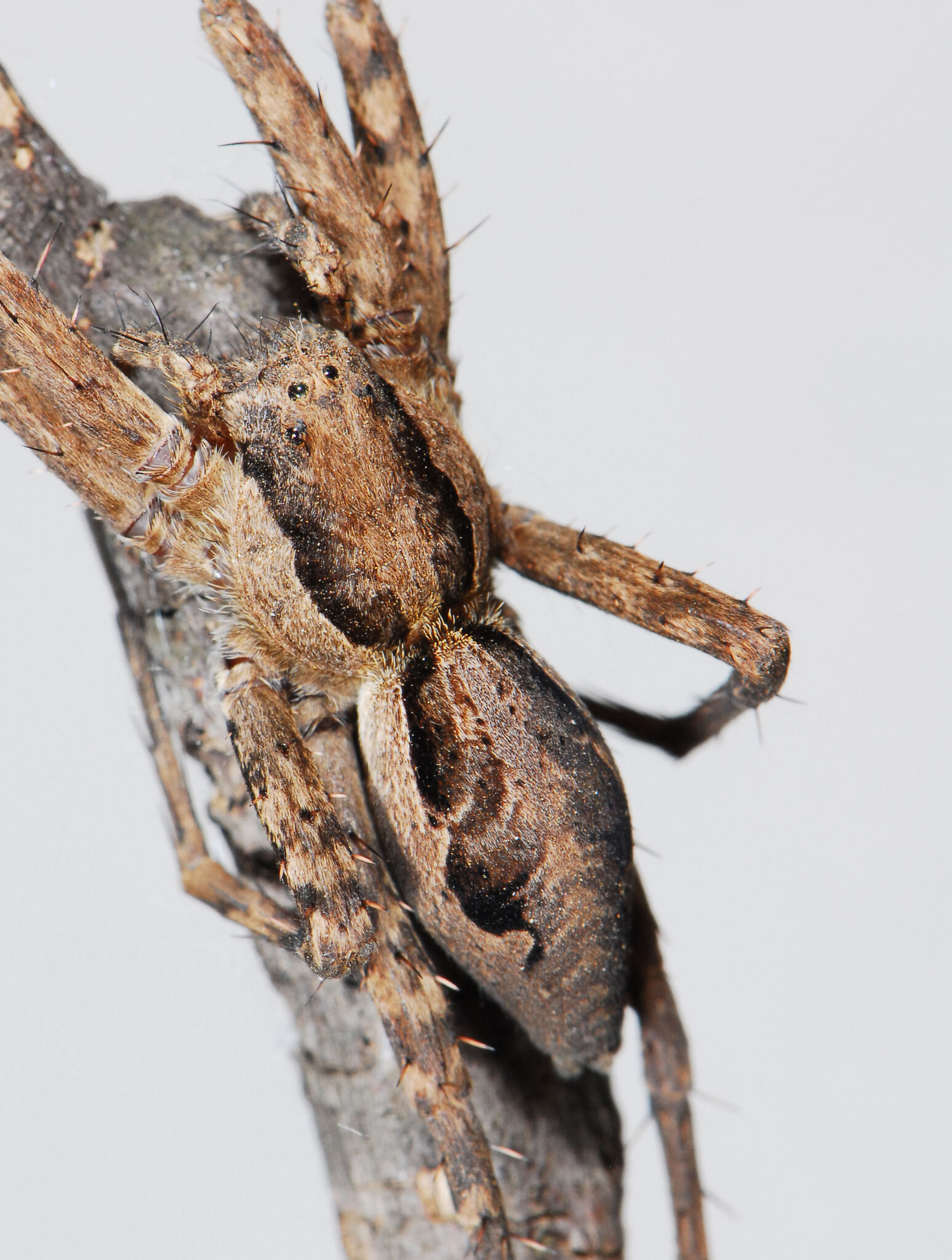
- female
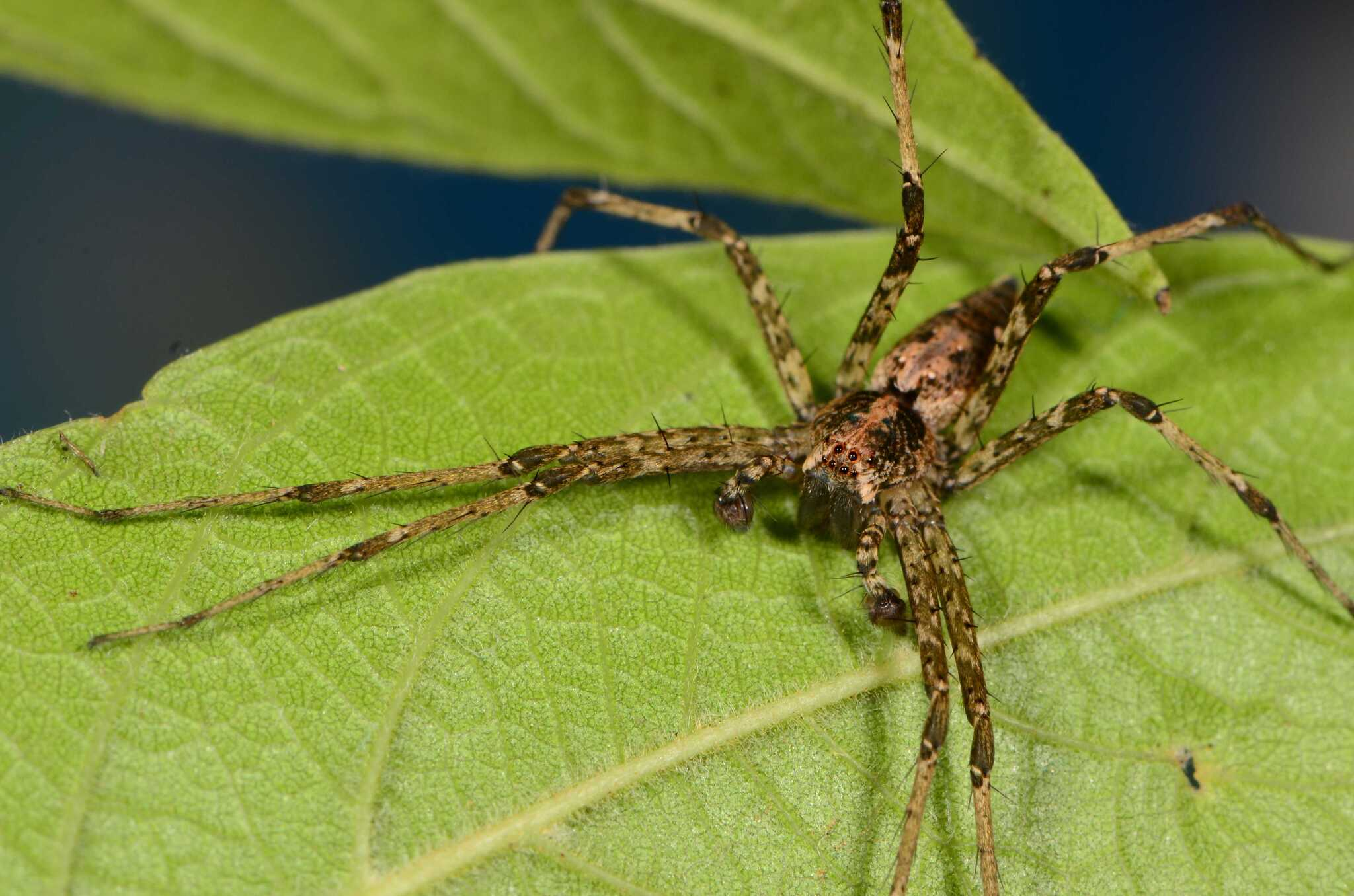
- male

Scientific classification
- Kingdom: Animalia
- Phylum: Arthropoda
- Subphylum: Chelicerata
- Class: Arachnida
- Order: Araneae
- Infraorder: Araneomorphae
- Family: Pisauridae
- Genus: Cispius
- Species: C. variegatus

Binomial name
- Cispius variegatus Simon, 1898

= Cispius variegatus =

Variegated Cispius nursery-web spider

Species of spider

Cispius variegatus is a species of spider in the family Pisauridae. It is found in the Democratic Republic of the Congo and South Africa, and is commonly known as the variegated Cispius nursery-web spider.

== Distribution ==
Cispius variegatus has been recorded from the Democratic Republic of the Congo and South Africa.

In South Africa, it has been sampled from three provinces at altitudes ranging from 5 to 1498 m.

South African localities include Coffee Bay and Addo Elephant National Park in the Eastern Cape, Irene in Gauteng, multiple sites in KwaZulu-Natal including iSimangaliso Wetland Park, Kosi Bay Nature Reserve and Tembe Elephant Park, and Hoedspruit in Limpopo.

== Habitat and ecology ==
The species constructs a funnel-like web in short shrubs and bushes close to the ground or in trees. They are active at night.

The species has been sampled from the Forest, Savanna and Thicket biomes.

== Description ==
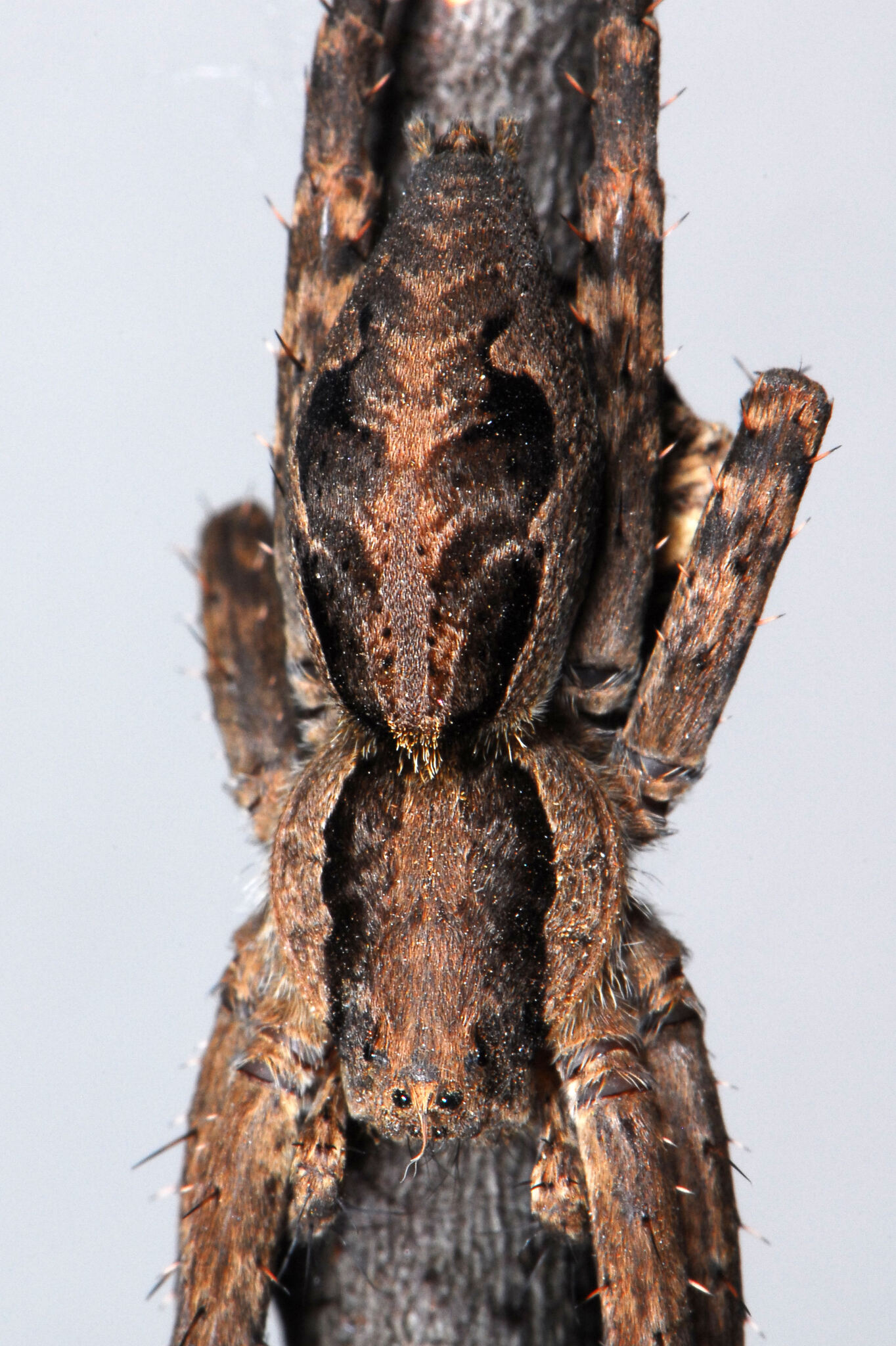
female

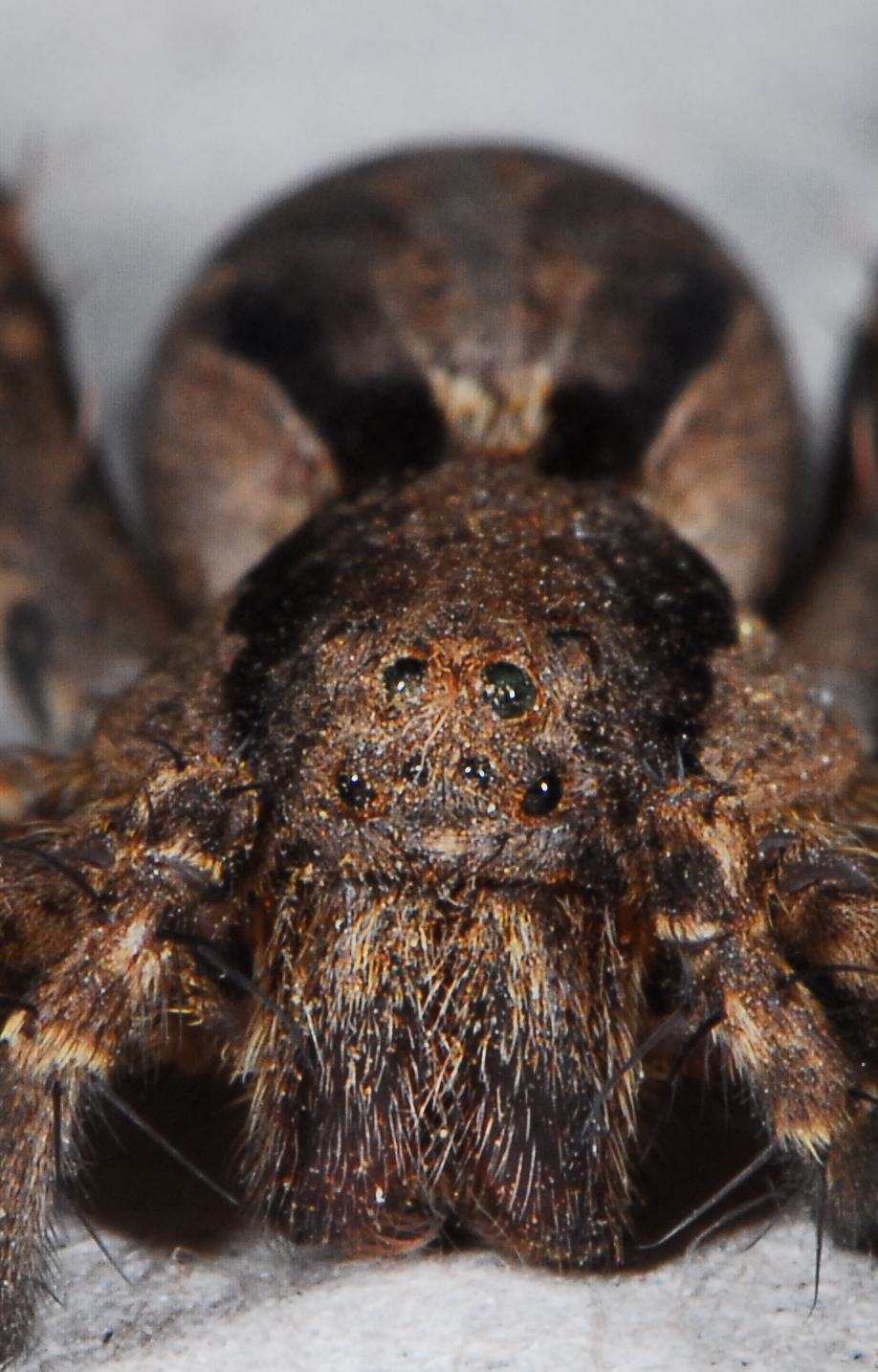
female

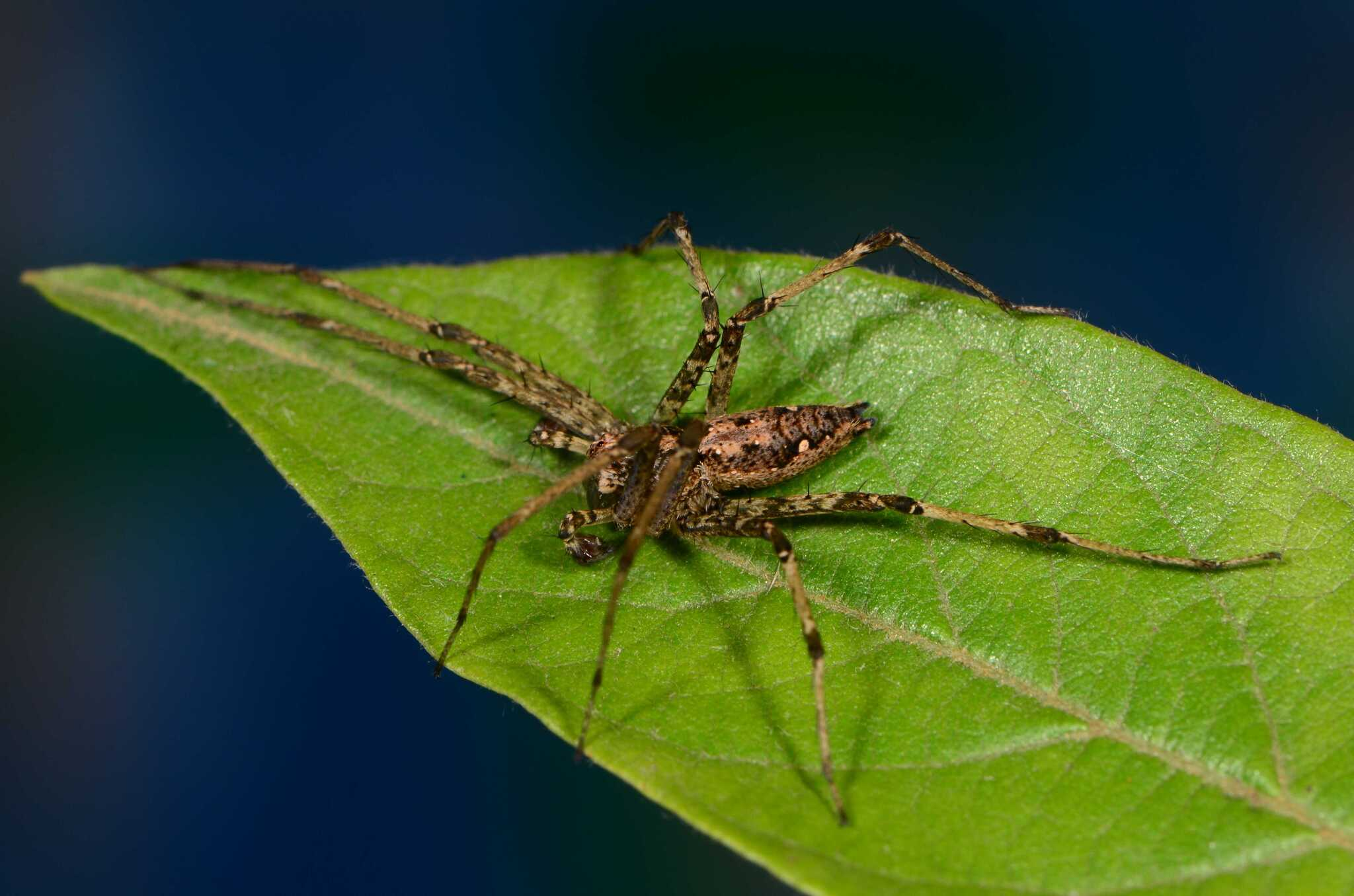
male

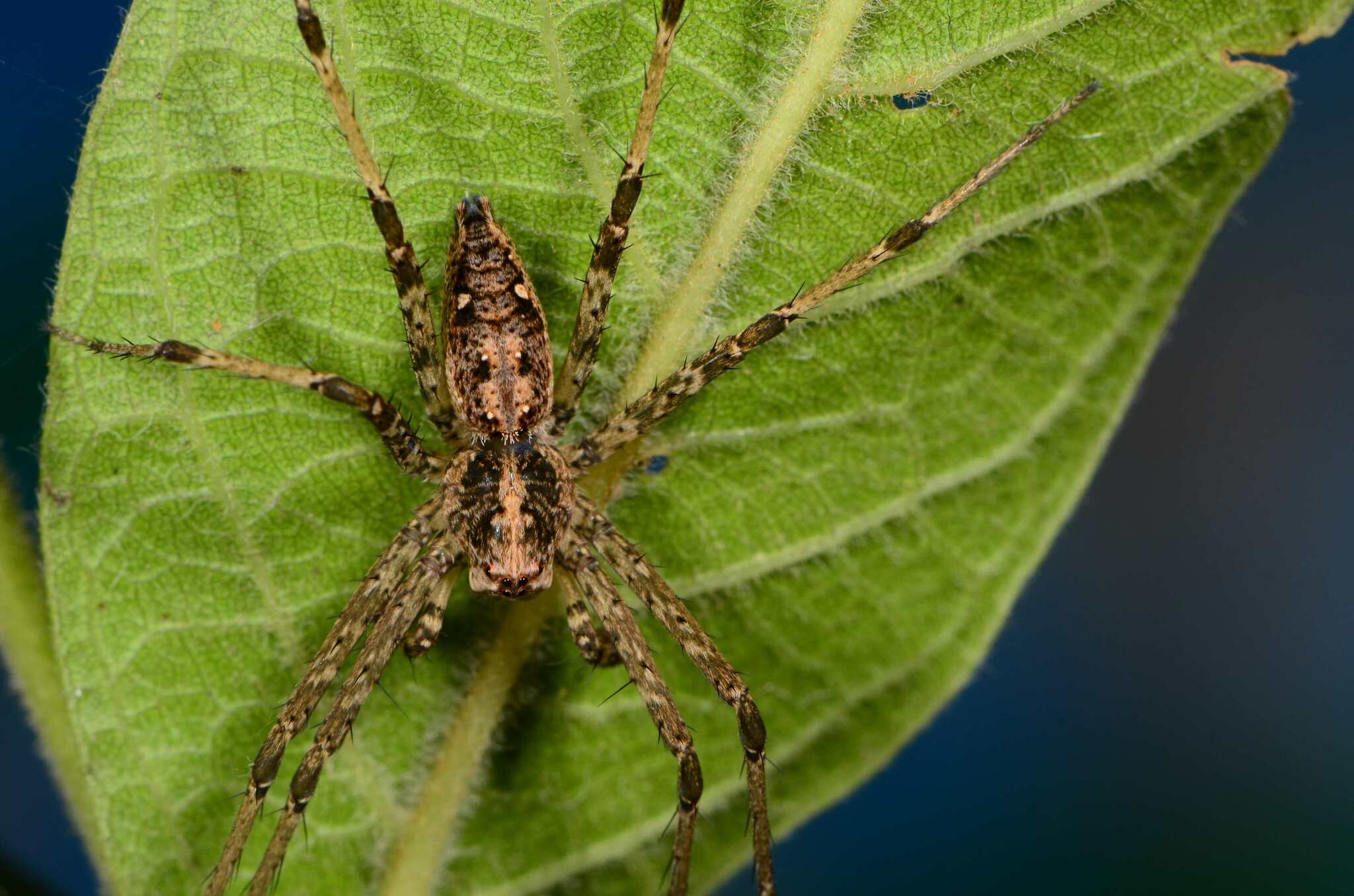
male

== Conservation ==
Cispius variegatus is listed as Least Concern. Although the species is presently known only from one sex, it has a wide geographical range. The species is protected in Addo Elephant National Park, Kosi Bay Nature Reserve and Tembe Elephant Park. There are no significant threats to the species.

== Taxonomy ==
The species was described by Eugène Simon in 1898 from the Democratic Republic of the Congo. It is the type species of the genus Cispius. The species is known only from the female and has been revised by Blandin (1978) and Sierwald (1997).
