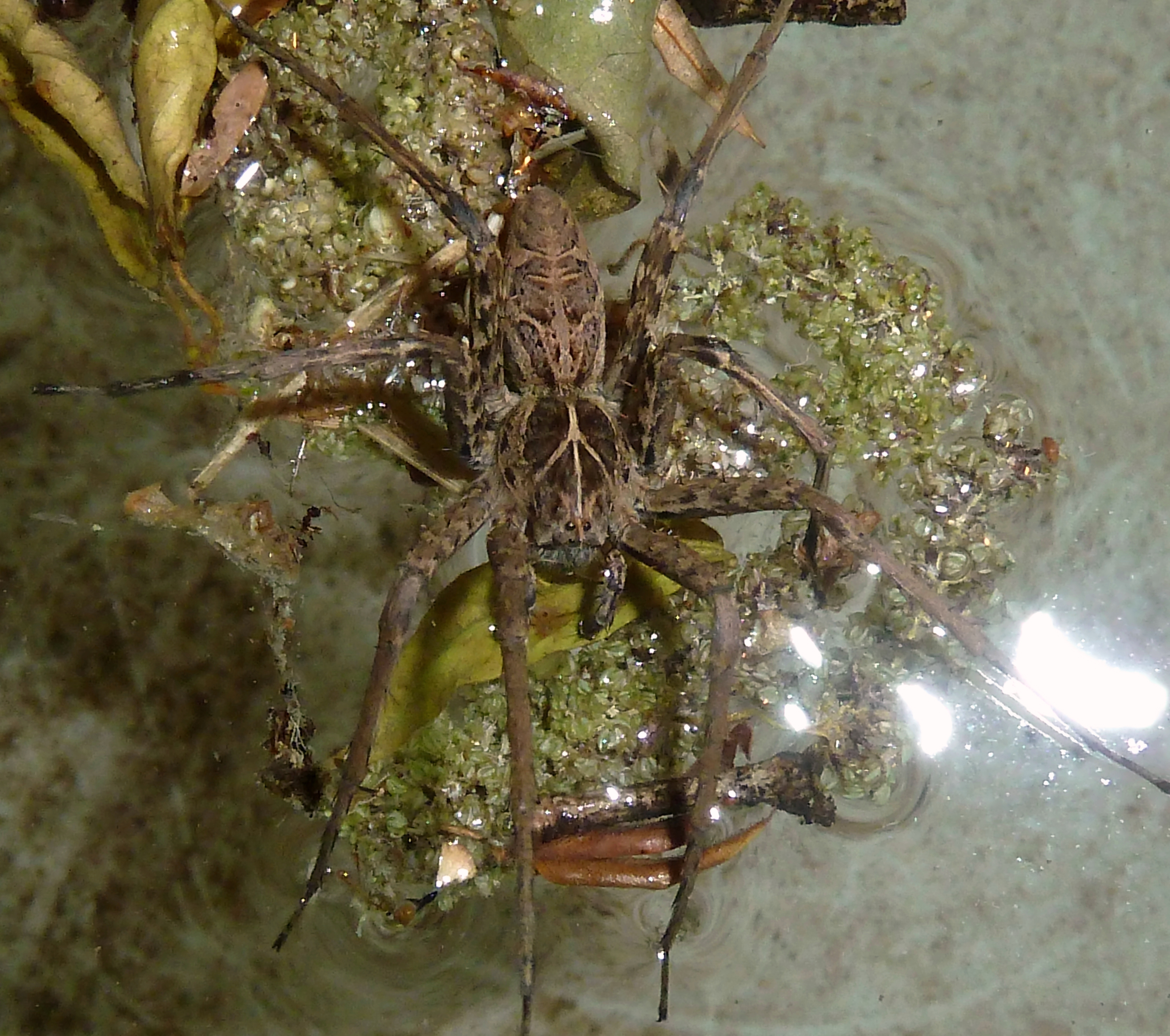
- C. kimbius in Pretoria
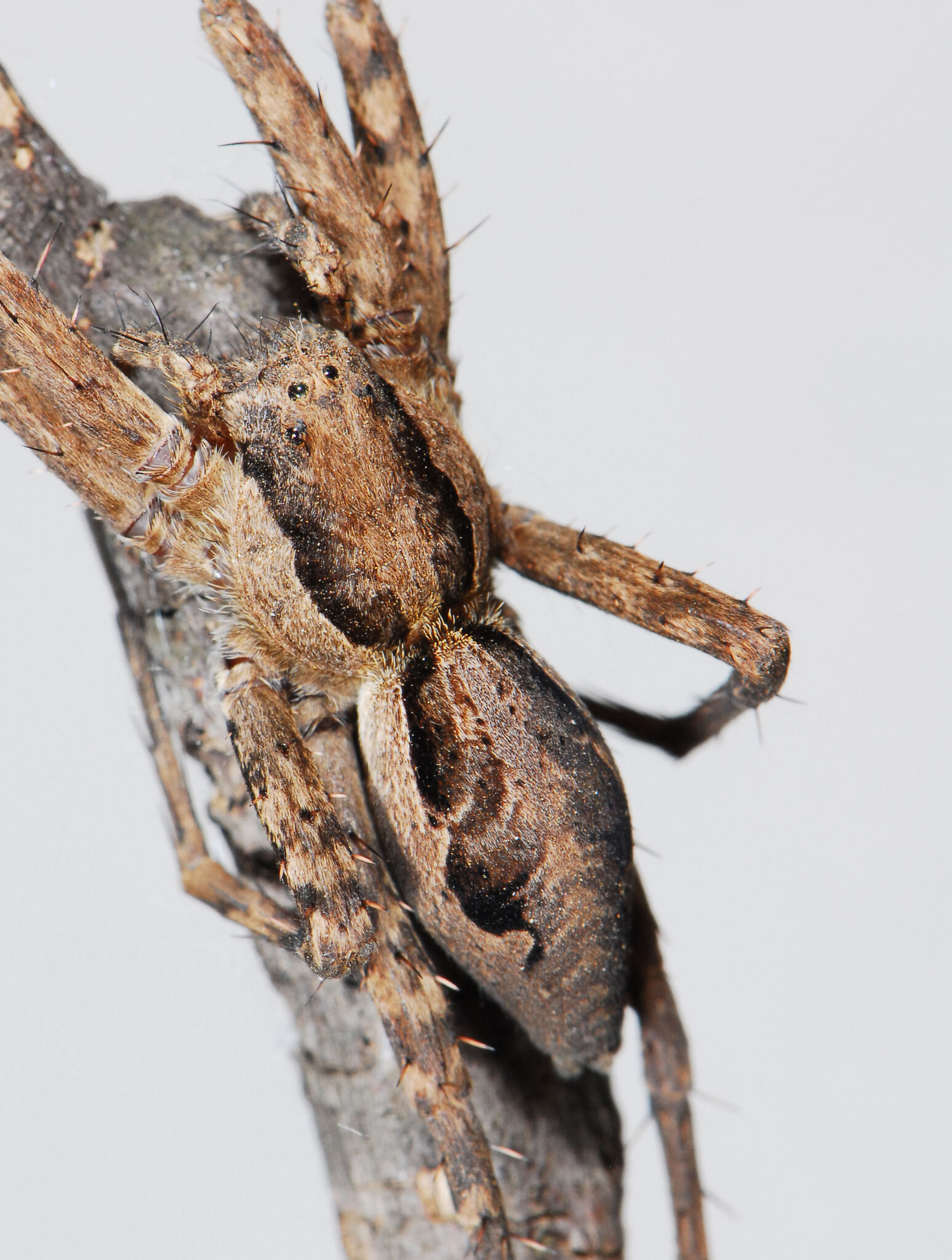
- female C. variegatus

Scientific classification
- Kingdom: Animalia
- Phylum: Arthropoda
- Subphylum: Chelicerata
- Class: Arachnida
- Order: Araneae
- Infraorder: Araneomorphae
- Family: Pisauridae
- Genus: Cispius; Simon, 1898

Type species
- C. variegatus Simon, 1898

Species
- 9, see text

= Cispius (spider) =

Genus of spiders

Cispius is a genus of African nursery web spiders that was first described by Eugène Louis Simon in 1898.

== Distribution ==
All species are found in Africa, from South Africa up to Tanzania and Ivory Coast.

== Description ==
Cispius species have a total size of 7 to 8 mm. The carapace is slightly longer than wide and narrower in the eye region. The eyes are arranged in two rows, with the anterior row more or less recurved. The anterior eyes are smaller than the posterior eyes. Most species have three cheliceral teeth. The abdomen is oval and decorated with patterns. The legs are strong and frequently banded.

== Taxonomy ==
The genus Cispius was described by Simon in 1898 and has been revised by Blandin (1987). Blandin remarked that Charminus and Cispius are morphologically very similar.

== Species ==
As of October 2025, this genus includes nine species:

- Cispius affinis Lessert, 1916 – Tanzania
- Cispius bidentatus Lessert, 1936 – DR Congo, Mozambique
- Cispius kimbius Blandin, 1978 – South Africa, Eswatini
- Cispius maruanus (Roewer, 1955) – Ivory Coast, Cameroon, DR Congo
- Cispius problematicus Blandin, 1978 – DR Congo, South Africa, Eswatini
- Cispius simoni Lessert, 1915 – Uganda
- Cispius strandi Caporiacco, 1947 – Tanzania
- Cispius thorelli Blandin, 1978 – DR Congo
- Cispius variegatus Simon, 1898 – DR Congo, South Africa (type species)
