= Spoegrivier =

- Location within Northern Cape Location within South Africa
- Coordinates: 30.341°S 17.760°E
- Country: South Africa
- Province: Northern Cape
- District: Namakwa
- Municipality: Kamiesberg

Area
  - Total: 0.34 km^{2} (0.13 sq mi)

Population (2011)
  - Total: 513
  - Density: 1,500/km^{2} (3,900/sq mi)

Racial makeup (2011)
  - Black African: 4.3%
  - Coloured: 94.7%
  - Indian/Asian: 1.0%

First languages (2011)
  - Afrikaans: 97.5%
  - Sign language: 1.8%
  - Other: 0.8%
- Time zone: UTC+2 (SAST)

Spoegrivier is a town in Namakwa District Municipality in the Northern Cape province of South Africa.

Town some 13 km west-north-west of Karkams and 46 km east of Hondeklipbaai. It takes its name from the non-perennial stream which rises north of it and extends south and then west to enter the Atlantic Ocean 20 km south-east of Hondeklipbaai. Afrikaans for ‘spit river’, the name is probably translated from Khoekhoen Kanoep, referring to a disease affecting cattle.
