= Garies =

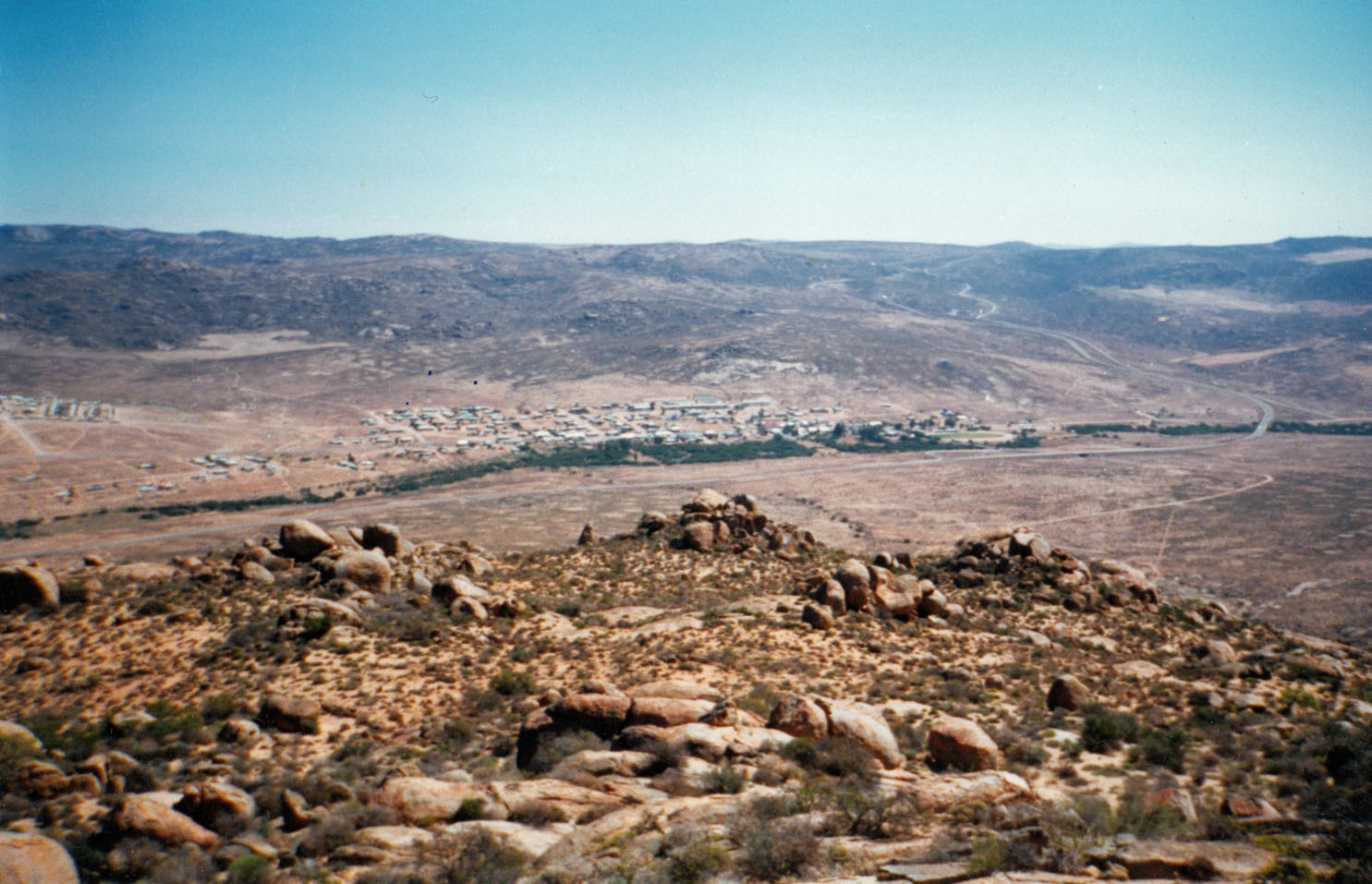
- Garies

- Location within Northern Cape Location within South Africa Location within Africa
- Coordinates: 30°33′28″S 17°59′22″E
- Country: South Africa
- Province: Northern Cape
- District: Namakwa
- Municipality: Kamiesberg

Area
  - Total: 69.44 km^{2} (26.81 sq mi)

Population (2011)
  - Total: 2,105
  - Density: 30.31/km^{2} (78.51/sq mi)

Racial makeup (2011)
  - Black African: 9.0%
  - Coloured: 79.1%
  - Indian/Asian: 0.5%
  - White: 10.1%
  - Other: 1.2%

First languages (2011)
  - Afrikaans: 96.0%
  - Other: 4.0%
- Time zone: UTC+2 (SAST)
- Postal code (street): 8220
- PO box: 8220
- Area code: 027

Garies is a small agricultural centre situated in South Africa's Northern Cape province about 110 km south of Springbok, the chief town of the Namaqualand district. Current population approximately 1500.

The Letterklip provincial heritage site is situated just west of town.

The town is in the Namaqualand district, at the foot of the Kamiesberg, 46 km south of Kamieskroon and 146 km northwest of Vanrhynsdorp. The name is Khoekhoen and means ‘couchgrass’, Afrikaans ‘kweek’.
