= Schulpfontein, Northern Cape =

Coordinates: 30.099029°S 17.188092°E

Schulpfontein in red with the other potential nuclear sites in blue

Schulpfontein is a coastal site near Hondeklip Bay in the Namakwa district of the Northern Cape province of South Africa. The site is approximately 95 km south-west of the town of Springbok.

The significance of this locale is that it has been identified as a possible future nuclear reactor site by South African electricity utility Eskom.
