= Kamiesberg =

Kamiesberg may refer to:

- Kamiesberge, a mountain range in South Africa
- Kamiesberg Local Municipality, a village in the Kamiesberge
