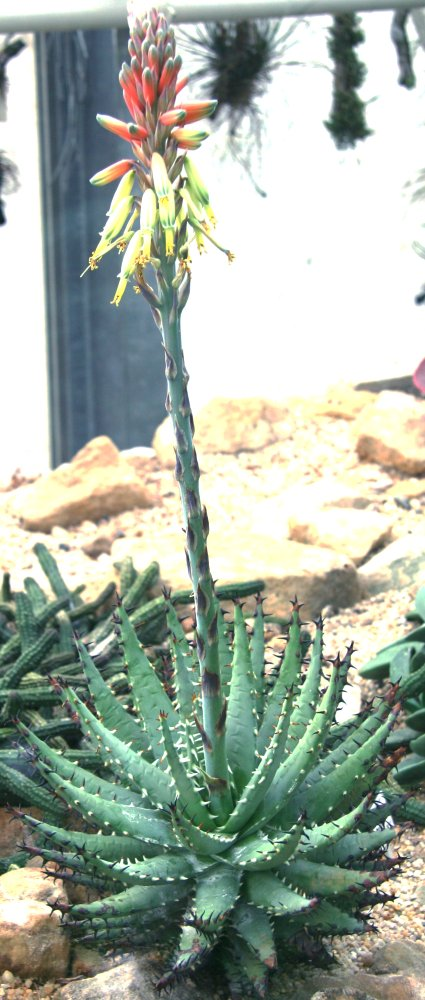

Conservation status
- Endangered (IUCN 3.1)

Scientific classification
- Kingdom: Plantae
- Clade: Tracheophytes
- Clade: Angiosperms
- Clade: Monocots
- Order: Asparagales
- Family: Asphodelaceae
- Subfamily: Asphodeloideae
- Genus: Aloe
- Species: A. erinacea

Binomial name
- Aloe erinacea D.S.Hardy

Synonyms
- Aloe melanacantha var. erinacea (D.S.Hardy) G.D.Rowley

= Aloe erinacea =

Species of succulent

Aloe erinacea (locally known as the Goree) is a rare species of succulent plant in the genus Aloe, from arid areas of Namibia.

== Distribution ==
It is endemic to Namibia. Its natural habitats are high mountain slopes in dry shrubland and rocky areas.

It naturally occurred over a very wide range, but this area is now highly fragmented due to is habitat loss, with different subpopulations being widely separated from each other. The species is also severely threatened by illegal collecting for the plant trade.

== Taxonomy ==
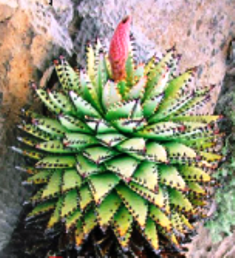
Aloe erinacea

This plant is sometimes classified as a subspecies or variety of the more common Aloe melanacantha, which occurs just to the south of the Namibian border, in the Namaqualand of South Africa. However Aloe erinacea is also considered by many authorities to be simply a closely related sister species of its more common relative to the south, with the two forming a continuum.

Superficially, Aloe erinacea looks almost identical to Aloe melanacantha, however it is slightly smaller and it sometimes grows into dense clumps due to offsetting.
