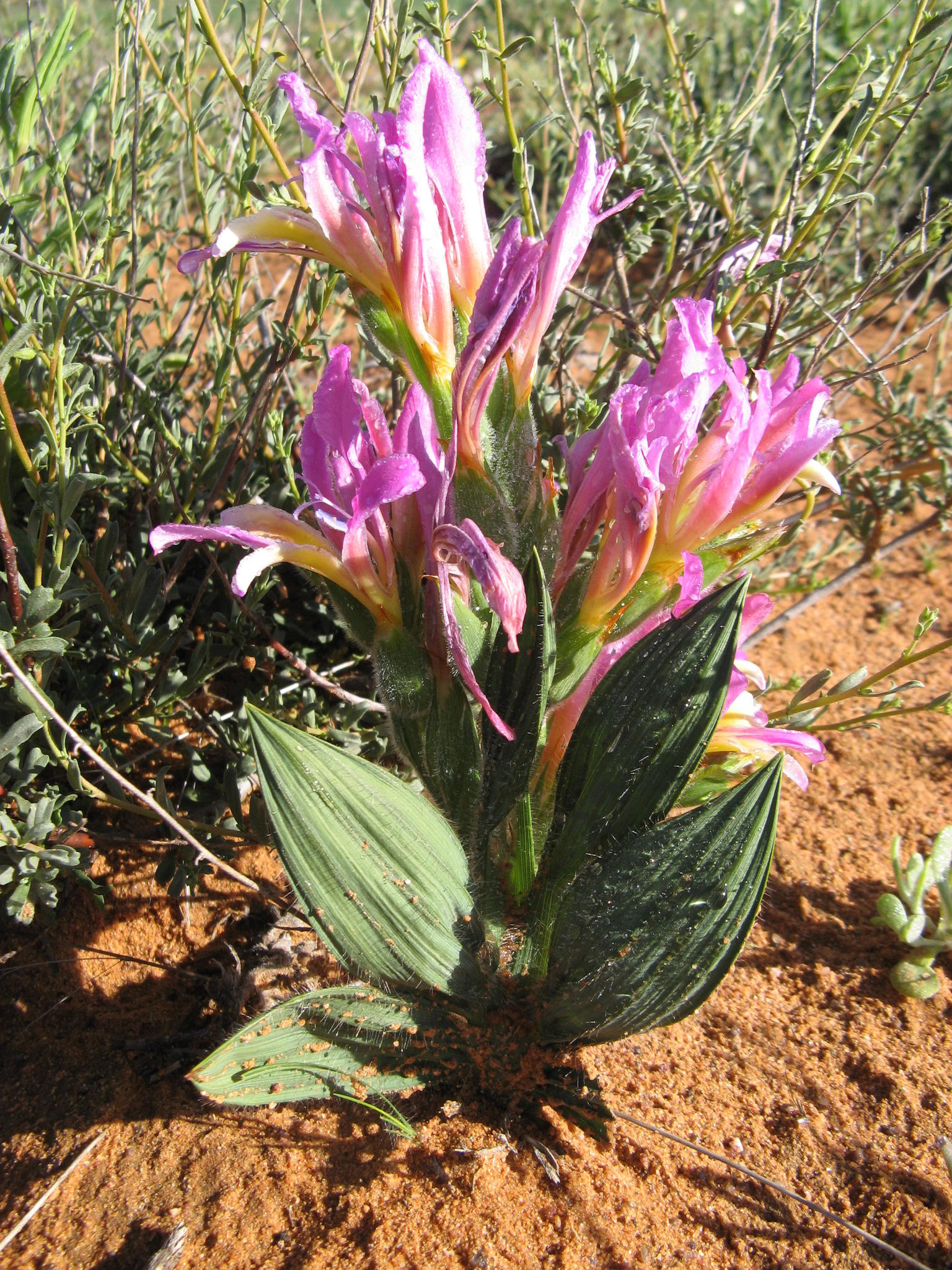

Scientific classification
- Kingdom: Plantae
- Clade: Tracheophytes
- Clade: Angiosperms
- Clade: Monocots
- Order: Asparagales
- Family: Iridaceae
- Genus: Babiana
- Species: B. rubella

Binomial name
- Babiana rubella Goldblatt & J.C.Manning

= Babiana rubella =

Species of flowering plant

Babiana rubella is a perennial plant species of 10–12 cm (3.9–4.7 in) high assigned to the Iridaceae-family. It has pink flowers and ovate or oblong leaf blades that are at an angle to the leaf sheaths. It grows on the coast of Namaqualand opposite Hondeklip Bay.

== Description ==
Babiana rubella is a perennial plant of 10–12 cm (3.9–4.7 in) high, that emerges from a deep-seated corm of up to 3 cm (1.2 in) in diameter. The base of the stem has a well-developed fibrous collar that extends above the ground. The inflorescence is a more or less upright or angled simple spike or has one branch, that is covered by leaf sheaths and densely set long hairs where it is exposed. The broadly lance-shaped to ovate leave blades are held at an angle, sometimes almost a right angles to the leaf sheaths. The leaf blades slightly pleated, densely set with long hairs of up to 4 mm (0.16 in) long on the veins and margins. The variably hairy leaf sheaths are short, broad and overlapping. The 2 bracts that are subtending the flowers are 1½-2½ cm long, densely hairy, green with the tips drying to rusty brown, the inner about as long as the outer, forked only at the tip or as far as midlength, or transparent along the upper mid-line. There are mostly 3-6 mirror-symmetrical, two-lipped, lightly rose-scented, pale to deep pinkish purple flowers in each spike. The lower lateral tepals are yellow with pink tips, the perianth tube is 12–15 mm (0.47–0.59 in) long, which is about half as long as the free part of the tepals. The dorsal tepal is 28–30 mm (1.1–1.2 in) long and 8–9 mm (0.31–0.35 in) wide. The lower lateral tepals joined for about 5 mm (0.20 in) further to upper laterals compared to the dorsal tepal. The 3 lower tepals are joint to one another for about {{cvt}3|mm|in}}. The upper laterals are about 24 mm (0.94 in) long, the lower tepals are 23–25 mm (0.91–0.98 in) long and crisped along lower margins. The stamens are clustered along the dorsal tepal and consist of arched filaments of about 14 mm (0.55 in) long that are topped by about 4.5 mm (0.18 in) long pale bluish anthers, that release white pollen. The smooth ovary is about 3 mm (0.12 in) long and sits at the base of the style that arches over the stamens. Flowers open between August aand early September.

== Distribution ==
Babiana rubella can be found in the Northern Cape province of South Africa, where it grows in sandveld near Kotzesrus. Here it has an area of occurrence of 150 km^{2} and there are two subpopulations. The total population is estimated at less than 1000 plants. The species has lost its habitat to crop cultivation.
