= Dutch Reformed Church, Springbok =

Church in Springbok, South Africa

Coordinates: 29°39′59.90″S 17°53′5.83″E

Dutch Reformed Church
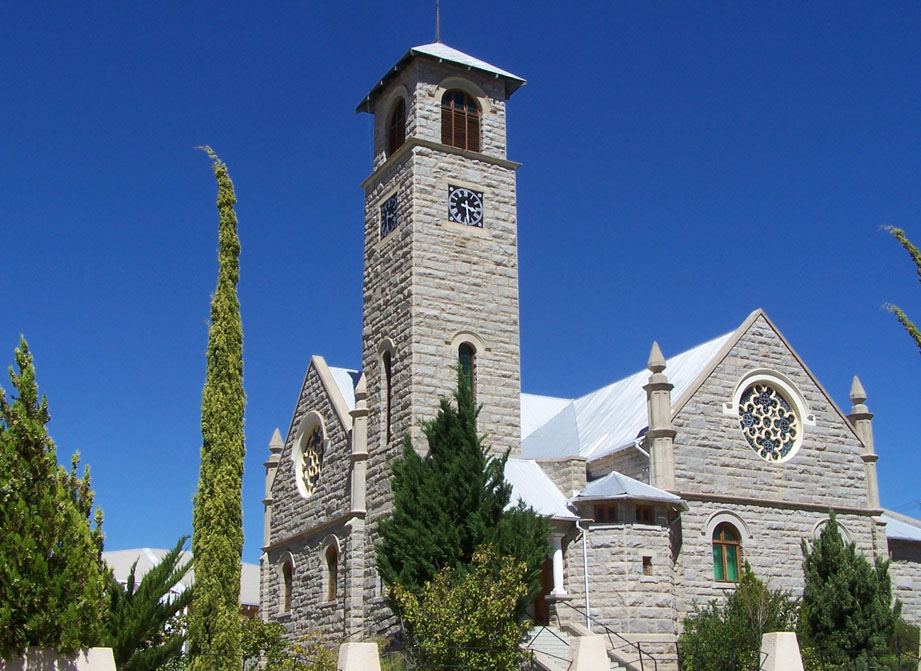
- Dutch Reformed Church
- Location: Springbok
- Country: South Africa
- Denomination: Nederduits Gereformeerde Kerk

History
- Founded: 1850

Architecture
- Functional status: Church

The Dutch Reformed Church in Springbok, also known as the Klipkerk, was founded in 1850 as the 42nd congregation in the Dutch Reformed Church in the settlement of Bowesdorp, south of Springbok, which was abandoned with the relocation of Kamieskroon in 1923 and where only a few ruins remained for decades. Although the core of the congregation is in the Northern Cape town of Springbok, the congregation falls under the Synod of the Western and Southern Cape and lends its name to the most northwestern ring of this Synod which also included the diamond mining town of Oranjemund in Namibia until it was transferred to the NG Church in Namibia in 2013.

The congregation is the mother congregation of the NG churches in Namaqualand. After the membership in the mining towns of Nababeep and Aggeneys declined sharply, so that these congregations could no longer support their own pastor, their church council entered into an agreement with the mother congregation, in terms of which the minister(s) of Namaqualand remained responsible for Simon van der Stel (Nababeep) and Aggeneys.

== Background ==
The first cattle farmers began to settle around 1750 on the edge of Little Namaqualand (to distinguish it from Great Namaqualand across the Orange River in what later became South West Africa) in the so-called Hardeveld. In this arid region, the water-rich Kamiesberge mountains attracted the most attention. From around 1760, one farm after another was given out and the settlers gradually tamed the area.

== Ministers ==
- Johannes Stephanus Hauman, 1870–1881
- Willem Johannes Conradie, 1886–1895
- Willem Siebert Edward Rörich, 1897–1908 (expelled)
- Jacobus Arnoldus Retief du Toit, 12 February 1910–1918
- Willem Petrus Steenkamp, 1919–1926 (resigned)
- Willem Lucas Steenkamp, 1928–1935, 1944–1950
- Adriaan Hendricks Stander, 1951–1958 (after which he accepted his emeritus position)
- Johan Christiaan Lamprecht, 1957–1961
- Gideon Stephanus Jacobus Möller, 1958–1962
- Lodewikus Petrus du Preez, 1963–1977
- Matthys Michielse (Thys) Agenbach, 1965–1975 (after which first pastor of daughter congregation Boesmanland until his retirement on 21 November 1988)
- Dirk Johannes Venter, 1967–1972
- Steyn McCarthy, 1977–present
- Hendrik Jacobus Greeff, 20 January 1984 -?
- Pieter Steyn, – ?
- Nicolas Jacobus Louw (Nicol) Smit, 2009–present

== Sources ==
- (in Afrikaans) Dreyer, eerw. A. (samesteller). 1932. Jaarboek van die Nederduits-Gereformeerde Kerke in Suid-Afrika vir die jaar 1933. Kaapstad: Jaarboek-Kommissie van die Kerke.
- (in Afrikaans) Gaum, Frits (hoofred.) 2008. Christelike Kernensiklopedie. Wellington: Lux Verbi.BM en Bybelkor.
- Haywood, J.J. 1944. Die Afrikaner-Gids 1944. Bloemfontein: Die Afrikaner-Gids (Edms.) Bpk.
- (in Afrikaans) Kotzé, dr. D.A. 1981. Van Roodezand tot Gariep. Die 150-jarige bestaan van die N.G. Gemeente Clanwilliam 1826–1976. Clanwilliam: NG Kerkraad.
- (in Afrikaans) Olivier, ds. P.L. (samesteller), 1952. Ons gemeentelike feesalbum. Kaapstad en Pretoria: N.G. Kerk-uitgewers.
- (in Afrikaans) Schoeman, B.M. 1977. Parlementêre verkiesings in Suid-Afrika 1910–1976. Pretoria: Aktuele Publikasies.
- (in Afrikaans) Smit, ds. A.P.. 1973. Ligglans oor die Berge. Eeufeesgedenkboek Nederduitse Gereformeerde Kerk en Gemeenskap, 1873–1973. Barkly-Oos: NG Kerkraad, met die medewerking van die plaaslike stadsraad.
- (in Afrikaans) Smit, ds. M.T.R. Smit. 1953. Gedenkalbum Nederduitse Gereformeerde Kerk Ugie, 1903–1953. Ugie: Die Kerkraad.
