= Soebatsfontein =

- Location within Northern Cape Location within South Africa
- Coordinates: 30.117°S 17.583°E
- Country: South Africa
- Province: Northern Cape
- District: Namakwa
- Municipality: Kamiesberg

Area
  - Total: 0.42 km^{2} (0.16 sq mi)

Population (2011)
  - Total: 276
  - Density: 660/km^{2} (1,700/sq mi)

Racial makeup (2011)
  - Coloured: 97.8%
  - Indian/Asian: 0.4%
  - White: 1.8%

First languages (2011)
  - Afrikaans: 96.4%
  - Tswana: 1.8%
  - Other: 1.8%
- Time zone: UTC+2 (SAST)
- PO box: 8257

Soebatsfontein is a settlement in Namakwa District Municipality in the Northern Cape province of South Africa.

Settlement 80 km south-west of Springbok and 48 km north-west of Kamieskroon. The name, Afrikaans for ‘begging or pleading fountain’, dates from an incident about 1898 in which Hendrik S(t)ievert, a farmhand, was murdered by San in spite of his begging for mercy.
