= Kamiesberge =

Mountain range in South Africa

Kamiesberg
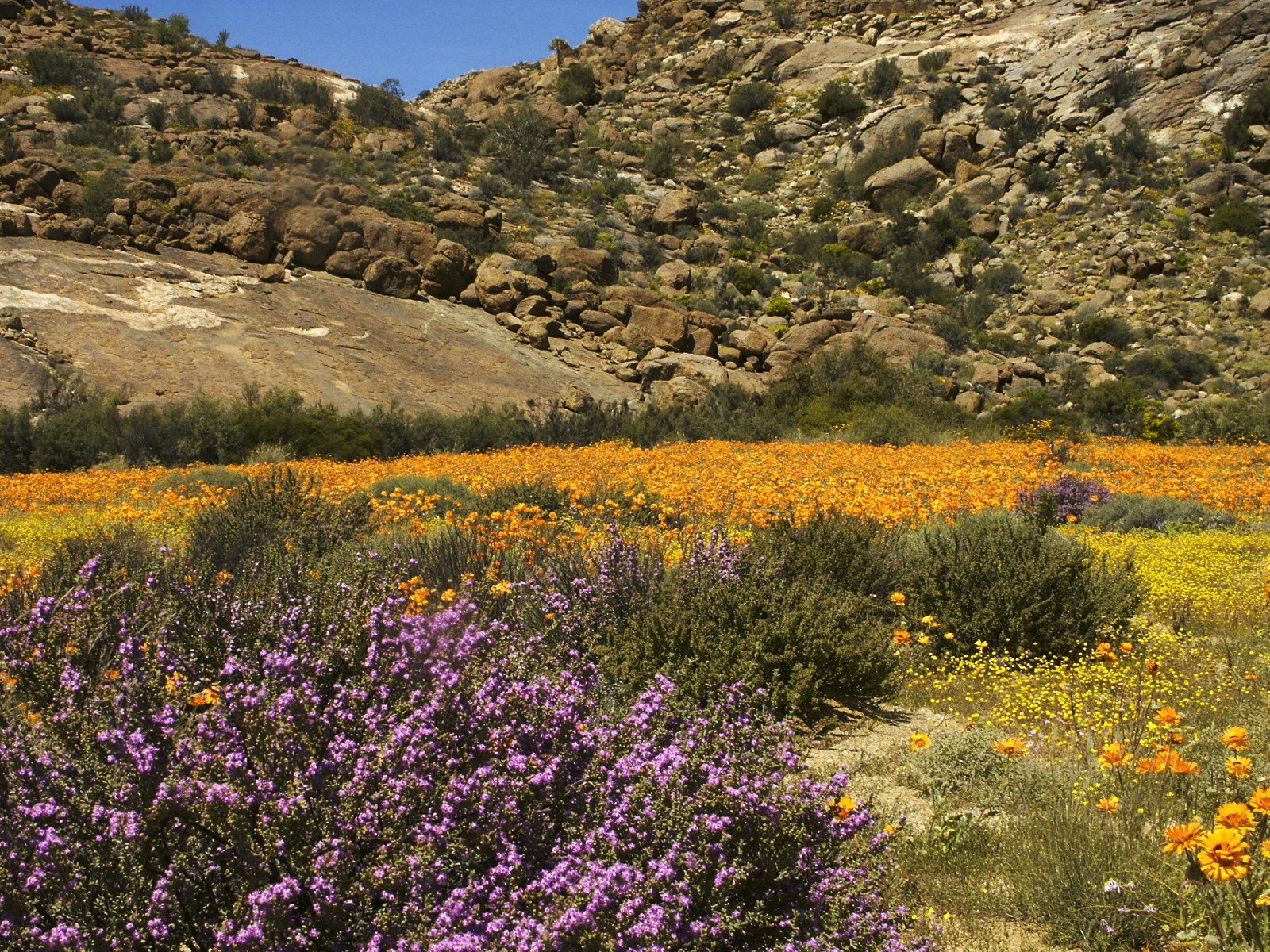
- Goegap Nature Reserve in the Kamiesberge

Highest point
- Peak: Rooiberg Peak
- Elevation: 1,706 m (5,597 ft)
- Listing: List of mountain ranges of South Africa
- Coordinates: 30°05′20″S 17°58′45″E

Dimensions
- Length: 140 km (87 mi) NNW/SSE
- Width: 40 km (25 mi) ENE/WSW

Geography
- Location within Northern Cape
- Country: South Africa
- Province: Northern Cape

Geology
- Rock type(s): granite and gneiss

The Kamiesberg or Kamiesberge is a mountain range of jumbled granite inselbergs or bornhardts dotted over sandy plains and centered on Kamieskroon in Namaqualand in South Africa. This range is very like the Matopos of Zimbabwe in appearance. It stretches for about 140 km (60 mi) from Garies in the south to Springbok in the north and forms a plateau between the Sandveld of the Cape West Coast and Bushmanland in the east, with the Hardveld of the mountainous central Kamiesberg escarpment in the midst.

== History ==
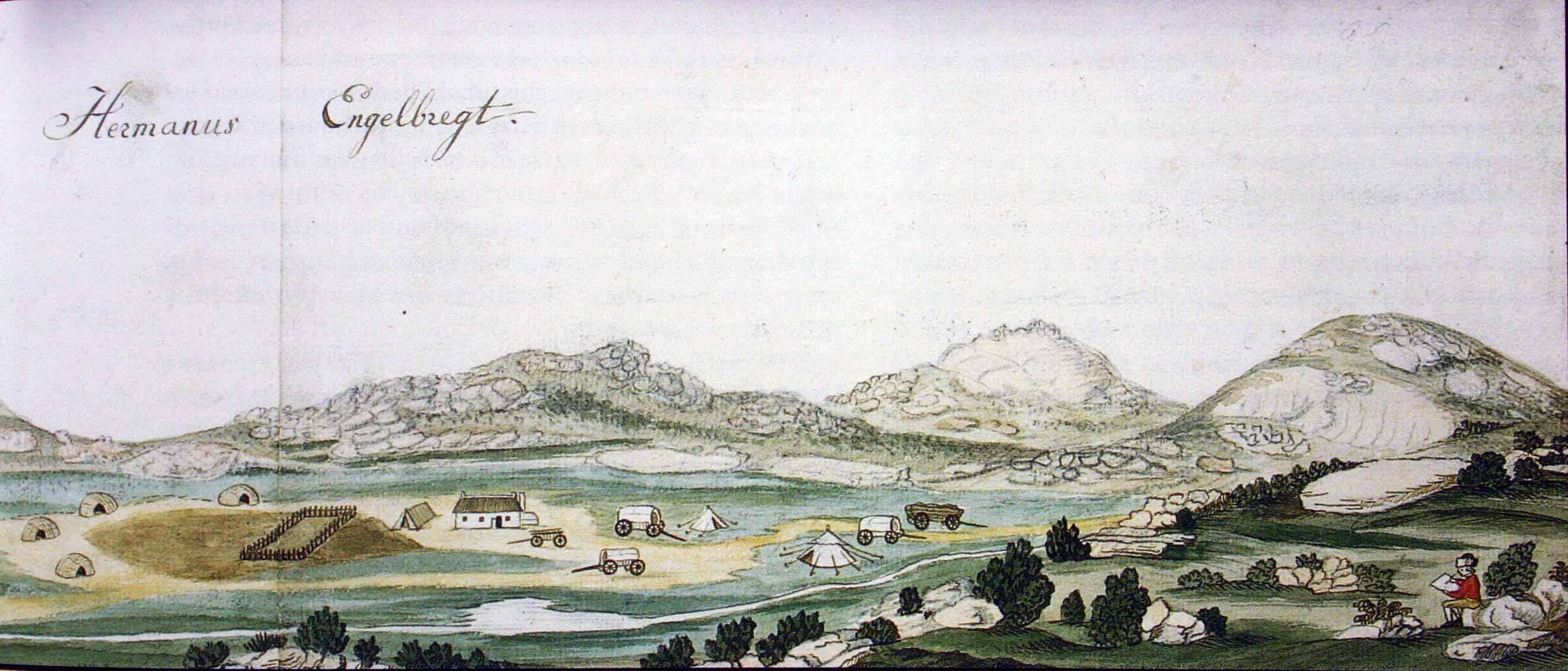
'Ellenboogfontein' near present-day Kamieskroon - Kamiesberge in background

The region was formerly occupied by Khoekhoe who were nomadic pastoralists.

The buildings of Kamieskroon were moved from a previous location known as Bowesdorp, named after the village doctor. Steep granite hills and a shortage of water hindered development, so that it was relocated. The foundations of the original village may still be seen in a rocky ravine some 8 km north of Kamieskroon.

The Leliefontein mission station, known for the Leliefontein massacre in 1902, is located at an elevation of 1 500 m (5 000 ft) on a plateau near the top of the mountains, which attains a height of over 1 700 m (5 600 ft).

== Ecology ==
The range has a mild climate made moderate by the cold Benguela Current. It is an outlier of the Cape Floristic Region. Its vegetation is largely Succulent Karoo with a large number of endemic species. Quiver trees and Camelthorn trees are common with large numbers of Euphorbia shrubs. Also occurring are Ceraria namaquensis, Euclea tomentosa, Rhus undulata, Ozoroa dispar and Tylecodon paniculatus.

The Kamiesberg is unusual among desert areas in that rainfall is relatively predictable, with frost being rare. Rain is usually accompanied by heavy dewfall and fog. Bergwinds during winter can result in temperatures of 40 °C. After a winter of adequate rainfall, springtime brings widespread and spectacular flowering of Asteraceae and Brassicaceae species that were dormant, Aizoaceae and numerous Scrophulariaceae, Poaceae, Liliaceae and Amaryllidaceae. The region is considered one of 25 global plant biodiversity hotspots and portions were declared protected in 1999 in order to preserve the abundant wildlife and colourful wild flowers. The Goegab Nature Reserve near Springbok is a good place to appreciate the floral wonders of the mountains.

== See also ==
- List of mountain ranges of South Africa
- Kamieskroon

== Bibliography ==
- Anderson, P. and Hoffman, M.T. 2005. The effects of sustained heavy grazing on plant diversity and composition: A study of the Kamiesberg, in Allsopp, N and Hoffman, M.T. (2005), Towards Sustainable Land Use in Namaqualand: Proceedings of the Namaqualand Colloquium, 24–26 May. Published by ARC- Range and Forage Institute, University of the Western Cape, Cape Town
