= Koingnaas =

- Location within Northern Cape Location within South Africa
- Coordinates: 30.196°S 17.287°E
- Country: South Africa
- Province: Northern Cape
- District: Namakwa
- Municipality: Kamiesberg

Area
  - Total: 46.93 km^{2} (18.12 sq mi)
- Elevation: 95 m (312 ft)

Population (2011)
  - Total: 105
  - Density: 2.24/km^{2} (5.79/sq mi)

Racial makeup (2011)
  - Coloured: 63.8%
  - Indian/Asian: 1.0%
  - White: 31.4%
  - Other: 3.8%

First languages (2011)
  - Afrikaans: 99.0%
  - Other: 1.0%
- Time zone: UTC+2 (SAST)
- PO box: 8249
- Website: www.koingnaas.com

Koingnaas is a village in Namakwa District Municipality in the Northern Cape province of South Africa. It is located 65 km south of Kleinzee.

Established in 1970, Koingnaas was once a flourishing diamond-mining town and satellite town to Kleinzee. Since De Beers' departure, the population has fallen rapidly from its peak of about 1,000 inhabitants.
