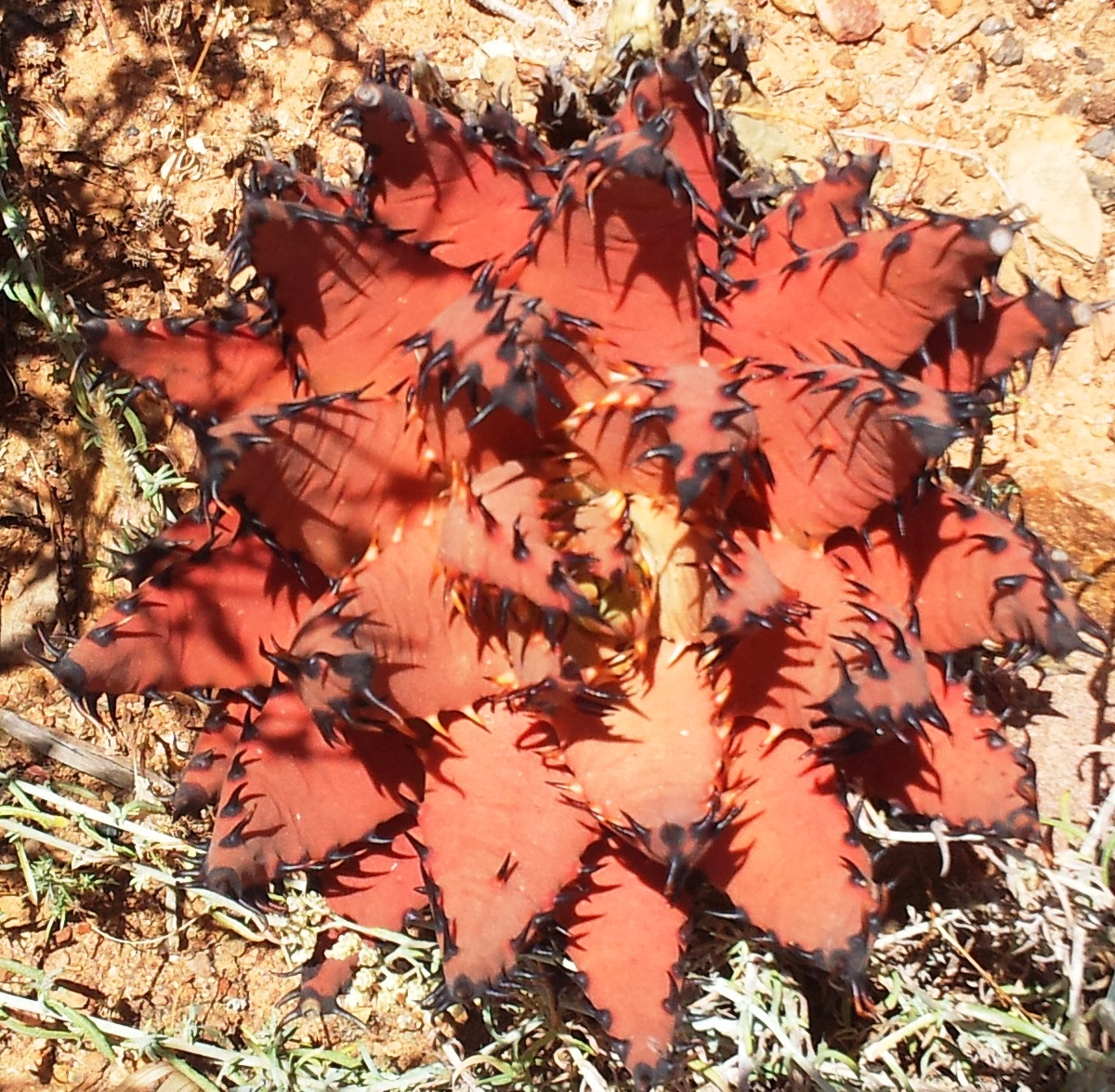
- Aloe melanacantha with a reddish colour due to drought

Conservation status
- CITES Appendix II

Scientific classification
- Kingdom: Plantae
- Clade: Tracheophytes
- Clade: Angiosperms
- Clade: Monocots
- Order: Asparagales
- Family: Asphodelaceae
- Subfamily: Asphodeloideae
- Genus: Aloe
- Species: A. melanacantha

Binomial name
- Aloe melanacantha A.Berger

Synonyms
- Aloe muricata Haw.

= Aloe melanacantha =

Species of flowering plant

Aloe melanacantha (locally known as the goree) is a rare species of succulent plant in the family Asphodelaceae, from the arid Namaqualand areas of the western part of South Africa.

== Distribution ==
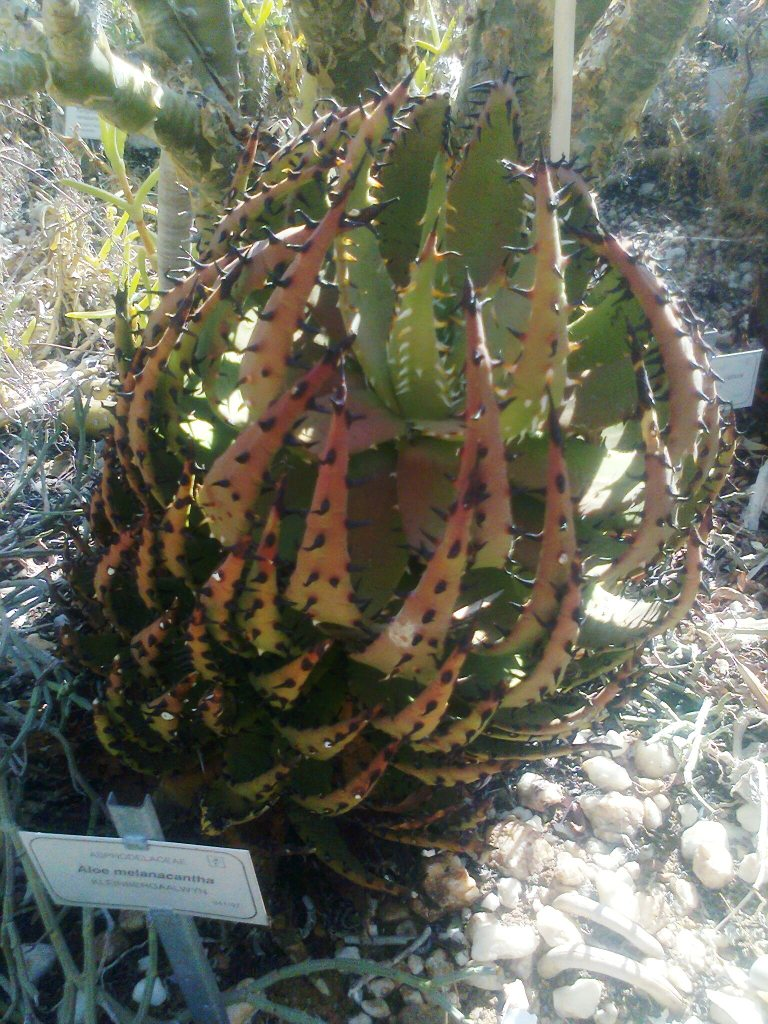
Aloe melanacantha in cultivation in Cape Town

It is endemic to the Namaqualand, in the far west of South Africa. It has been recorded from Nieuwoudtville in the south, as far north as the Orange River on the Namibian border. Its natural habitats are dry shrubland and rocky areas.

== Aloe melanacantha var. erinacea ==
This rare plant occurs in Namibia, just to the north of the Aloe melanacantha range, and is very closely related, being almost indistinguishable superficially. However, A. erinacea is slightly smaller and it sometimes grows into dense clumps due to offsetting.

Depending on the authority, it is sometimes classified as a subspecies or variety of Aloe melanacantha, and sometimes as a closely related sister-species or even as part of a species continuum.
