= Karkams =

- Location within Northern Cape Location within South Africa
- Coordinates: 30.367°S 17.883°E
- Country: South Africa
- Province: Northern Cape
- District: Namakwa
- Municipality: Kamiesberg

Area
  - Total: 30.28 km^{2} (11.69 sq mi)

Population (2011)
  - Total: 1,439
  - Density: 47.52/km^{2} (123.1/sq mi)

Racial makeup (2011)
  - Black African: 4.0%
  - Coloured: 95.2%
  - Indian/Asian: 0.3%
  - Other: 0.4%

First languages (2011)
  - Afrikaans: 96.0%
  - Tswana: 1.1%
  - Other: 2.9%
- Time zone: UTC+2 (SAST)

Karkams is a town in Namakwa District Municipality in the Northern Cape province of South Africa.
