= Goegap Nature Reserve =

Nature reserve in South Africa

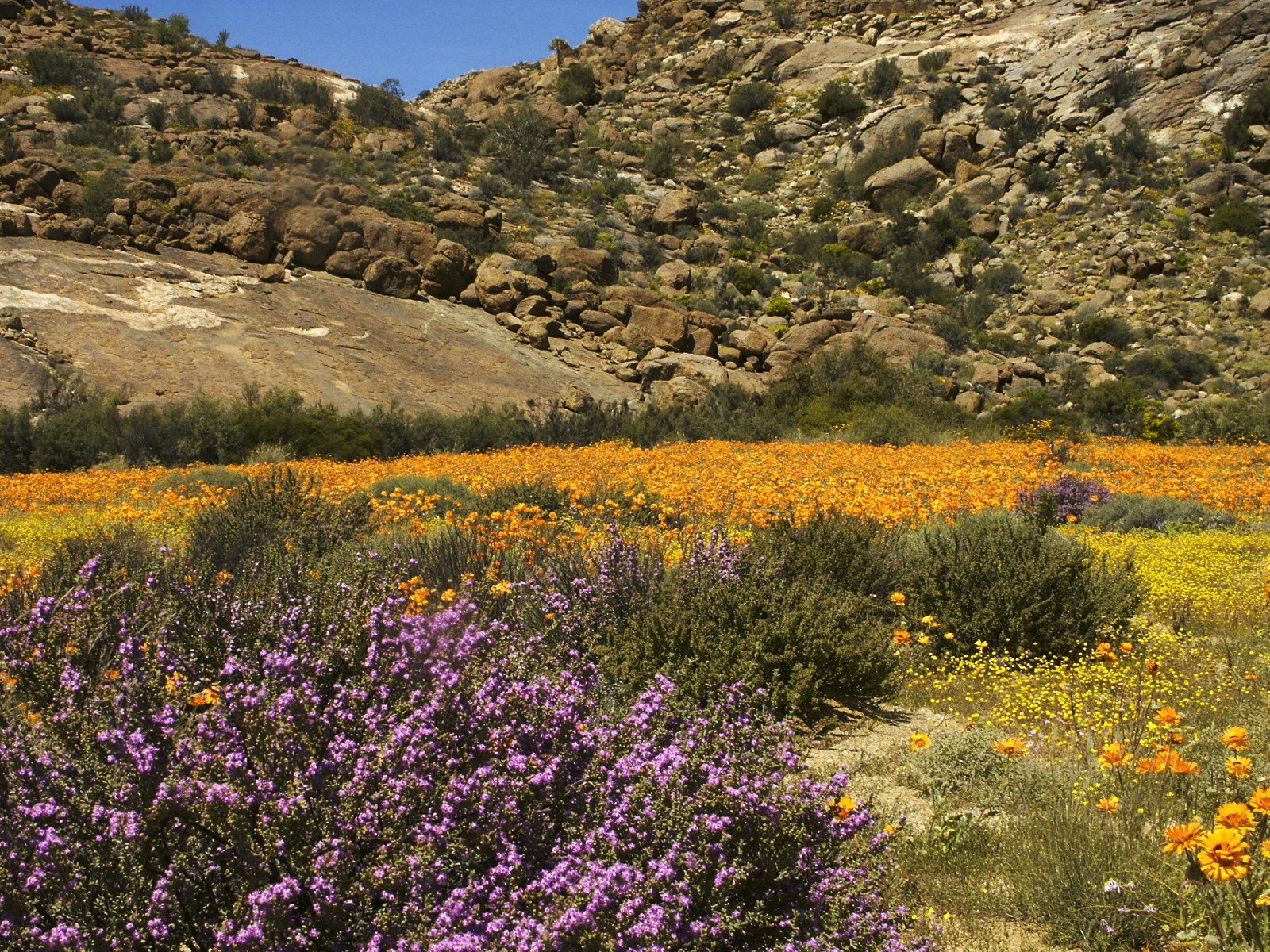
- Type: Nature Reserve
- Location: Springbok
- Coordinates: 29°41′18″S 17°57′57″E
- Area: 150 square kilometres (58 sq mi)
- Designated: 1966
- Website: Northern Cape Tourism

The Goegap Nature Reserve is a semi-desert nature reserve in Northern Cape, South Africa and lies around 8 km (5.0 mi) east of Springbok. The area was once used to graze livestock and was proclaimed in 1966 as a reserve then fenced in 1969 and wildlife introduced shortly afterward. It was originally known as the Hester Malan Nature Reserve.

After several extensions, the park currently covers an area of 150 km^{2} (58 sq mi). The name Goegap comes from the Khoekhoe word for "watering hole."

== Geography ==
Goegap is part of the Succulent Karoo transitioning into the Namaqualand Broken Veld, with an average rainfall of 150 mm (5.9 in) per annum. The temperatures are extreme, including frost in the winter and temperatures over 40 °C (104 °F) in the summer. The area includes wide, sandy plains and mountains, the highest is Carolusberg at 1,345 m (4,413 ft). There are roads for normal cars and tracks for 4x4 in the reserve. Looping trails ranging in length from 2 to 17 km start from the succulent garden.

== Biodiversity ==
The main attraction is the desert bloom that covers the sand with flowers in the spring provided enough winter rain. August and September are the most popular months to visit. Around 600 known plant species have been found here along with 45 mammal species and 94 types of bird.

=== Birds ===
Bird species found in the reserve include Cape eagle-owl, Black eagle, Booted eagle, Ludwig’s bustard, White-backed mousebird, Karoo eremomela, Dusky sunbird, ostriches, spotted dikkops and Ground woodpecker.

=== Mammals ===
Megafauna such as oryx, klipspringer, duiker, and the endangered Hartmann's mountain zebras call the park home. Other wildlife include smaller mammals, 26 reptile species, and 3 amphibian species.

=== Vegetation ===
The Hester Malan Wild Flower Garden features a succulent garden and a rock garden. The information library has valuable resources on the succulent plants of Namaqualand to accompany the planted and labeled examples of the featured succulents.

== Gallery ==
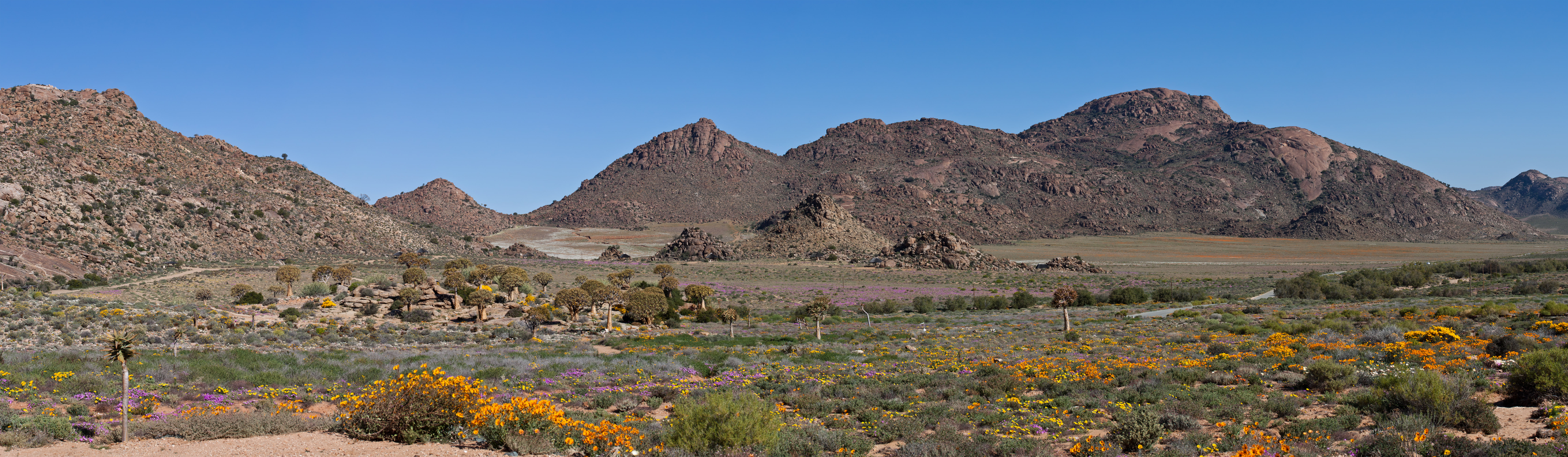
Typical landscape of Goegap Nature Reserve during the spring wildflower season.
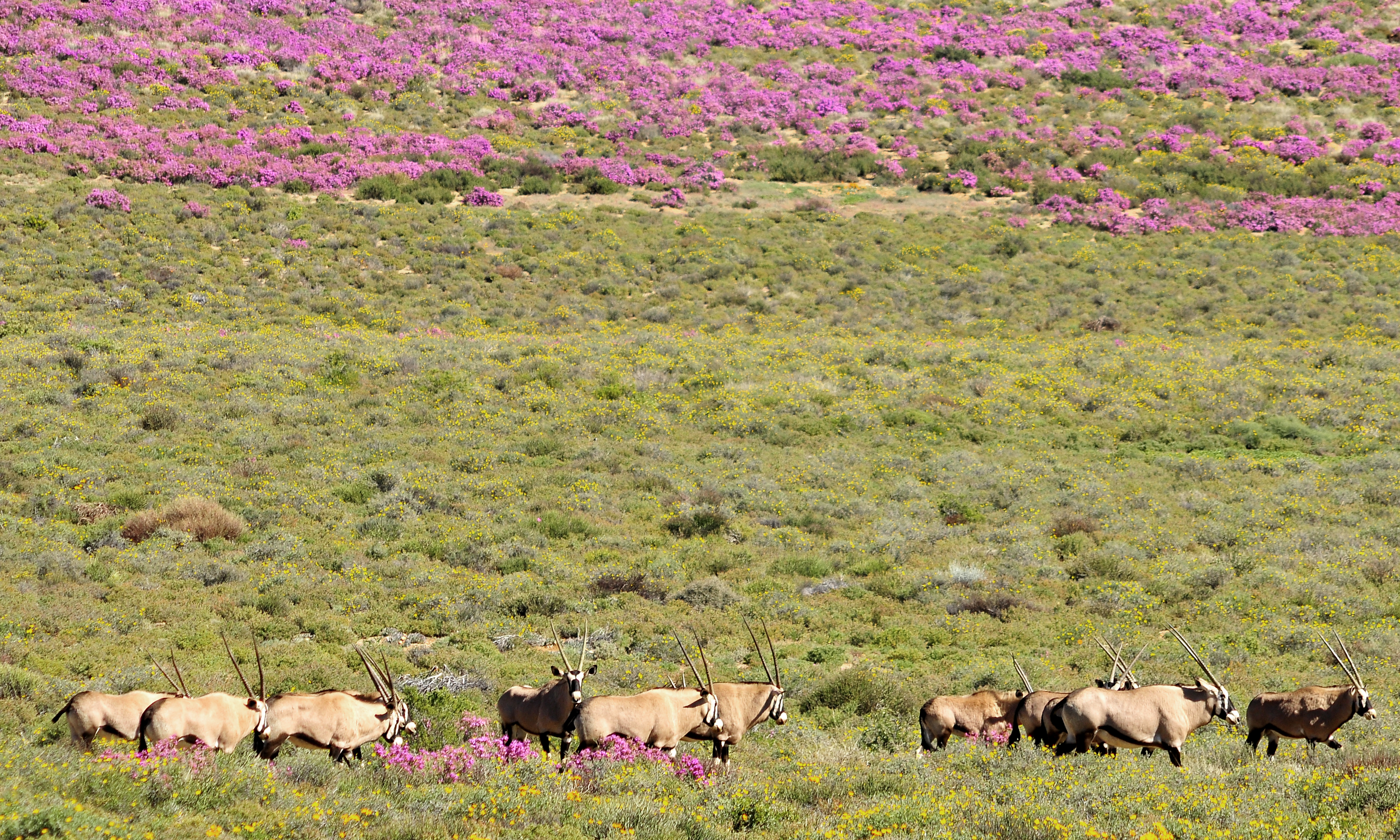

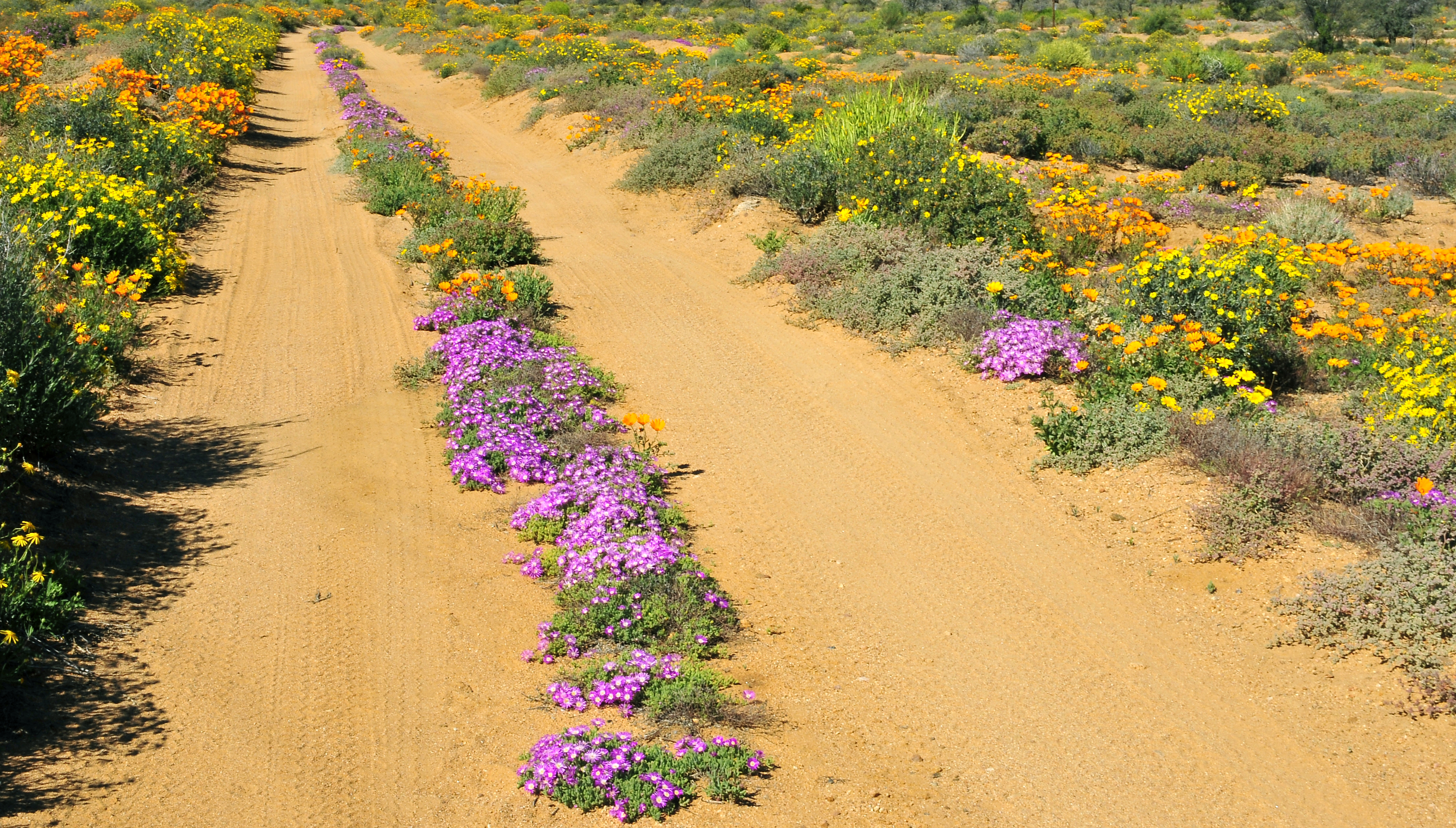

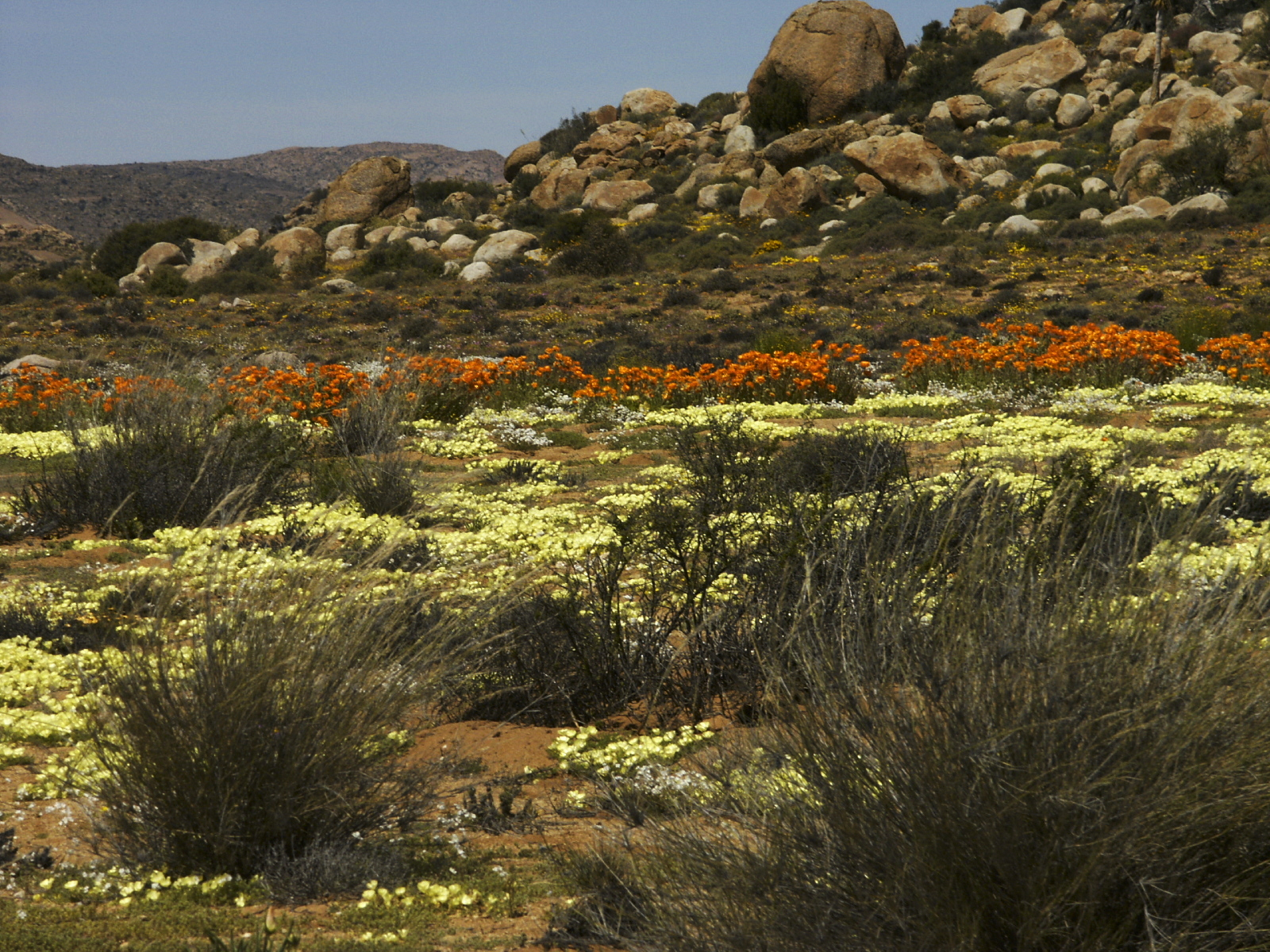

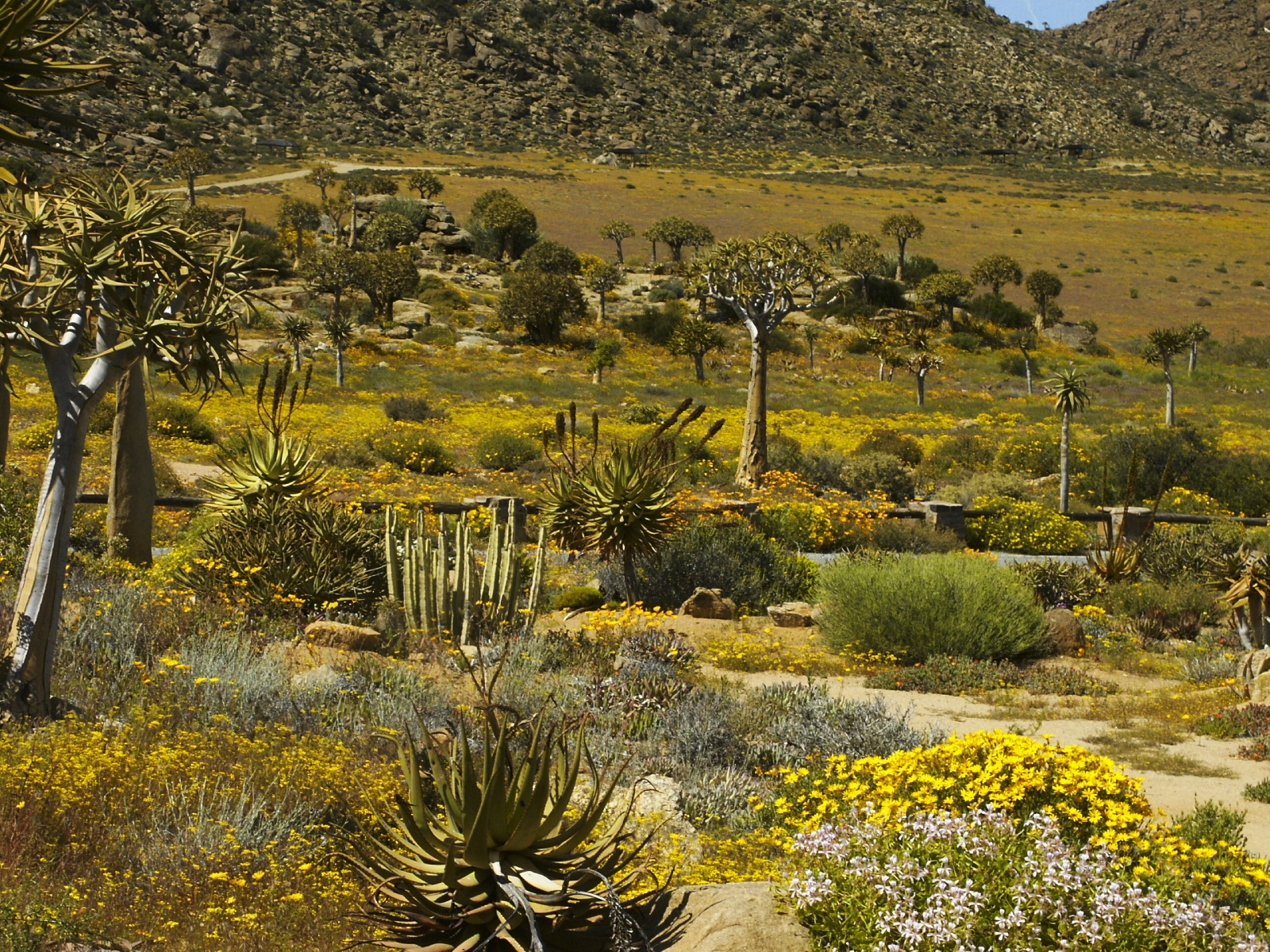

== See also ==
- List of protected areas of South Africa
