= Kamiesberg Local Municipality =

Kamiesberg
- Local municipality
- Seal

- Location in the Northern Cape
- Coordinates: 30°33′S 17°59′E
- Country: South Africa
- Province: Northern Cape
- District: Namakwa
- Seat: Garies
- Wards: 6

Government
  - Type: Municipal council
  - Mayor: Susara Nero (ANC)
  - Municipal Manager: Rufus Beukes
  - CFO: Frederick Strauss

Area
  - Total: 14,210 km^{2} (5,490 sq mi)

Population (2011)
  - Total: 10,187
  - Density: 0.7169/km^{2} (1.857/sq mi)

Racial makeup (2011)
  - Black African: 5.3%
  - Coloured: 85.6%
  - Indian/Asian: 0.5%
  - White: 8.1%

First languages (2011)
  - Afrikaans: 97.0%
  - Other: 3%
- Time zone: UTC+2 (SAST)
- Municipal code: NC064

Kamiesberg Municipality (Afrikaans: Kamiesberg Munisipaliteit) is a local municipality within the Namakwa District Municipality, in the Northern Cape province of South Africa.

== Population ==
According to the 2022 South African census, the municipality had a population of 15,130 people. Of those, 88.3% identified as "Coloured," 5.8% as "White," and 4.3% as "Black African."

Kharkams village represents, in many ways, the typical small town in Kamiesberg: the average education level is 6.7 years; electricity reached the village in 1999; water is available in nearly every house; villagers have access to health care once a week.

Sheep and goats are kept on villager-owned land between Kamiesberg's eleven villages.

== Topography and climate ==
Kamiesberg municipality spans three topographic zones. The area stretches from the sandy coastal lowlands (Sandveld) to the mountainous central Kamiesberg escarpment (Hardveld), and to the eastern plateau of Bushmanland. There are no perennial rivers in the area. Water is obtained from subterranean sources. Some of the water is pumped up by windmills, but most of the water to the communal areas is from natural springs. Many of these springs are semi-perennial, and the salt content of the water can vary from year to year, causing problems. In 2003 the rainfall was 131 mm (5 in) in Springbok (100 km (62 mi) north of Kamiesberg). Rainfall has on average decreased from 1970 to 1994.

== Soils and vegetation ==
Four main types of vegetation are found in the area: Mountains Renosterveld, Succulent Karoo, False Succulent Karoo and Namaqualand Broken Veldt. However, overall plant life is in a deteriorating state, and non-edible, undesirable and poisonous vegetation is taking over.

== Sources of household income in Kamiesberg ==
A survey (2003) of three communal villages in Kamiesberg (only 74 saailande owners) showed the following sources of household income: wage labour (49%), government transfers (28%), small business (11%), remittances (6%), livestock income (3%) and farm income (3%).

== Communal institutions ==
Like every other municipality in Namaqualand, Kamiesberg is governed by formal institutions. The most important formal institutions are: Kamiesberg Municipality located in Garies, the Common Management Committee (Meentcommetee), the Old Local Council and Transitional Local Councils (TLCs).

== Main places ==
The 2011 census divided the municipality into the following main places:

Place	Code	Area (km^{2})	Population
Garies	365016	69.4	2,105
Hondeklip Bay	365009	22.7	543
Kamassies	365001	0.9	341
Kamieskroon	365007	8.8	893
Karkams	365011	30.3	1,439
Kheis	365014	0.9	488
Klipfontein	365015	0.8	466
Koingnaas	365005	46.9	105
Leliefontein	365008	0.7	616
Lepelsfontein	365017	28.7	233
Nourivier	365006	0.3	460
Paulshoek	365013	0.7	415
Rooifontein	365003	0.7	332
Soebatsfontein	365004	0.4	276
Spoegrivier	365010	0.3	513
Tweerivier	365012	0.3	252
Remainder	365002	13,997.5	709
Total		14,210.2	10,187

== Politics ==
The municipal council consists of eleven members elected by mixed-member proportional representation. Six councillors are elected by first-past-the-post voting in six wards, while the remaining five are chosen from party lists so that the total number of party representatives is proportional to the number of votes received. In the election of 1 November 2021 the African National Congress (ANC) won a majority of six seats on the council. The following table shows the results of the election.

Kamiesberg local election, 1 November 2021
Party	Votes				Seats		
Party	Ward	List	Total	%	Ward	List	Total
African National Congress	2,695	2,712	5,407	52.4%	5	1	6
Democratic Alliance	1,208	1,238	2,446	23.7%	1	2	3
National Economic Fighters	427	430	857	8.3%	0	1	1
Namakwa Civic Movement	375	397	772	7.5%	0	1	1
Economic Freedom Fighters	271	259	530	5.1%	0	0	0
Freedom Front Plus	126	122	248	2.4%	0	0	0
Patriotic Alliance	40	–	40	0.4%	0	–	0
Independent candidates	9	–	9	0.1%	0	–	0
Total	5,151	5,158	10,309		6	5	11
Valid votes	5,151	5,158	10,309	99.1%			
Spoilt votes	48	46	94	0.9%			
Total votes cast	5,199	5,204	10,403				
Voter turnout	5,224						
Registered voters	7,484						
Turnout percentage	69.8%						
