= Hondeklip Bay =

Hondeklip Bay Hondeklipbaai
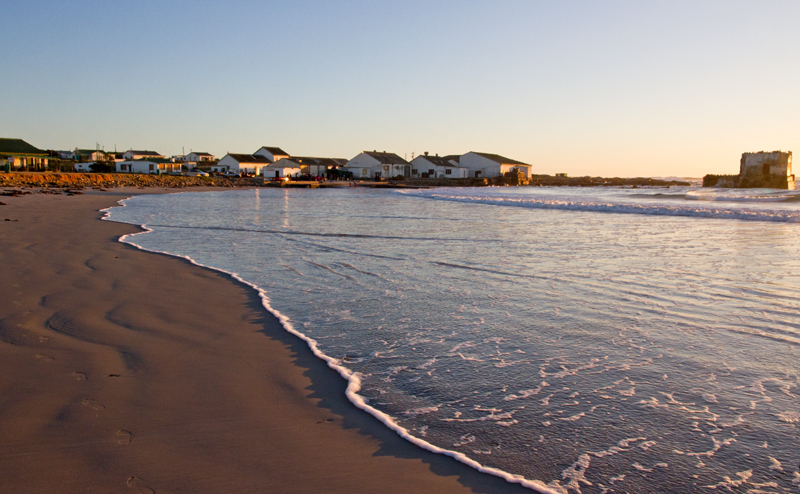
- Hondeklipbaai

- Location within Northern Cape Location within South Africa
- Coordinates: 30°19′S 17°16′E
- Country: South Africa
- Province: Northern Cape
- District: Namakwa/Namaqua
- Municipality: Kamiesberg

Area
  - Total: 22.66 km^{2} (8.75 sq mi)

Population (2011)
  - Total: 543
  - Density: 24.0/km^{2} (62.1/sq mi)

Racial makeup (2011)
  - Black African: 8.3%
  - Coloured: 80.5%
  - Indian/Asian: 1.5%
  - White: 8.8%
  - Other: 0.9%

First languages (2011)
  - Afrikaans: 96.9%
  - English: 1.1%
  - Sign language: 1.1%
  - Other: 0.9%
- Time zone: UTC+2 (SAST)
- PO box: 8222
- Area code: 027

Hondeklip Bay (Afrikaans: Hondeklipbaai, which translates as dog stone bay) is a coastal village in the Namakwa district of the Northern Cape province of South Africa. It lies about 95 km south west of the district capital Springbok.

This village was originally used as a harbor to export copper ore from the mines around Springbok but was later surpassed by Port Nolloth, which had a safer harbor as well as a railway line.

Today Hondeklip Bay is a popular regional holiday destination and serves the fishing and diamond-mining community. Holiday accommodation ranges from camping at the municipal caravan park to self-catering chalets at the Honnehokke Resort.

Attractions include ship wrecks like the Jahleel and the Aristea which ran aground in 2003 and 1945 respectively. In July 2016, the Jahleel started breaking up and split in two. For tourism information, visit the Hondeklip website.

The mouth of the Spoeg River is located about 18 km SSE down the coast from Hondeklip Bay. There are caves of archaeological interest there.

== Demographics (2001) ==
- Area: 19.68 square kilometres (7.60 sq mi)
- Population: 540: 27.44 inhabitants per square kilometre (71.1/sq mi)
- Households: 166: 8.43 per square kilometre (21.8/sq mi)

Gender	Population	%
Female	259	47.96
Male	281	52.04

Race	Population	%
Black	36	6.67
White	36	6.67
Coloured	468	86.67
Asian	0	0

First language	Population	%
IsiZulu	0	0
IsiXhosa	21	3.89
Afrikaans	504	93.33
Sepedi	0	0
Setswana	0	0
English	3	0.56
Sesotho	9	1.67
Xitsonga	0	0
SiSwati	0	0
Tshivenda	0	0
IsiNdebele	0	0
Other	3	0.56
