= Namaqualand =

Arid region of Namibia and South Africa

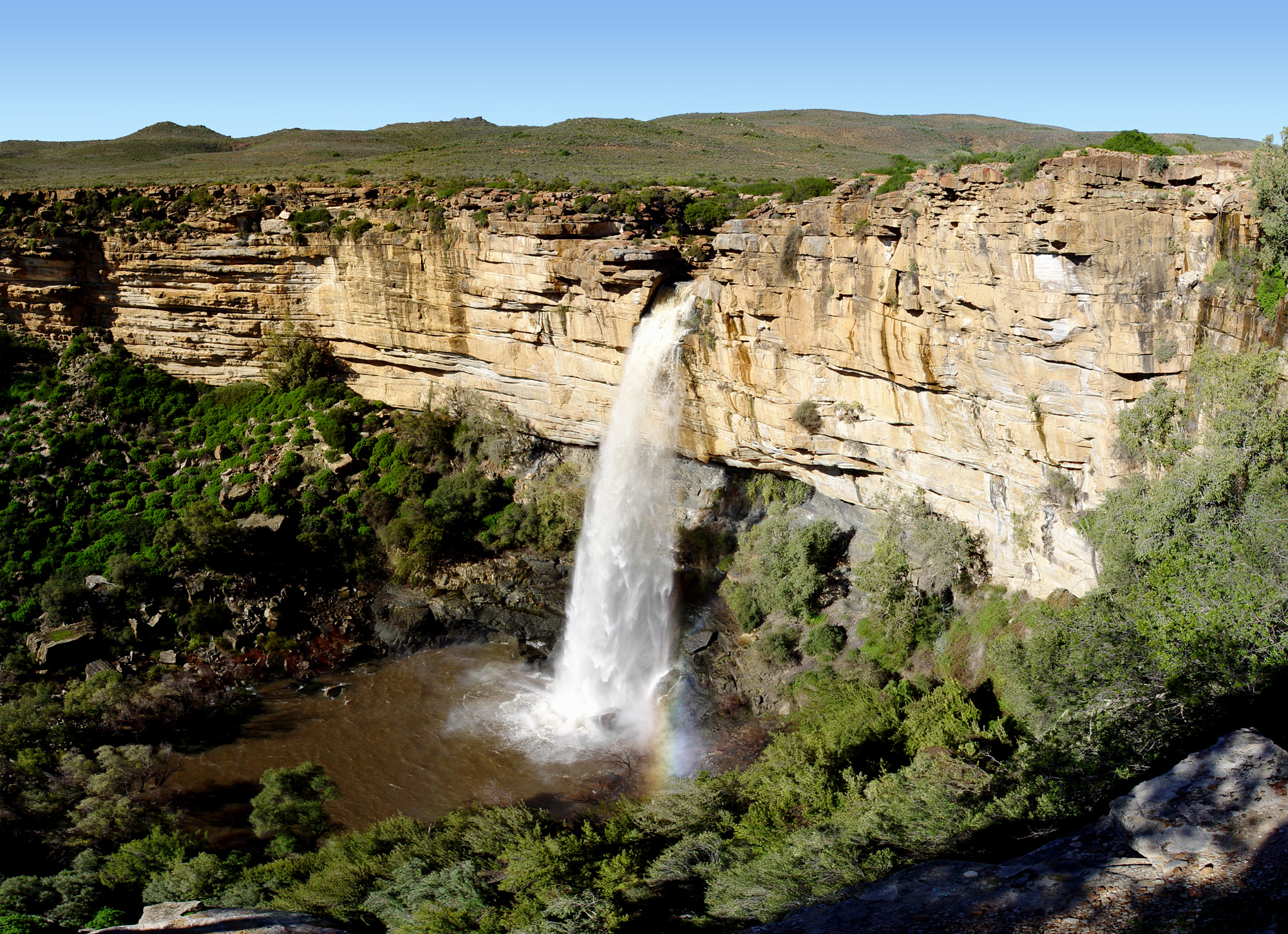
A waterfall situated a few kilometres north of Nieuwoudtville on the road to Loeriesfontein, in the Northern Cape (Namaqualand region)

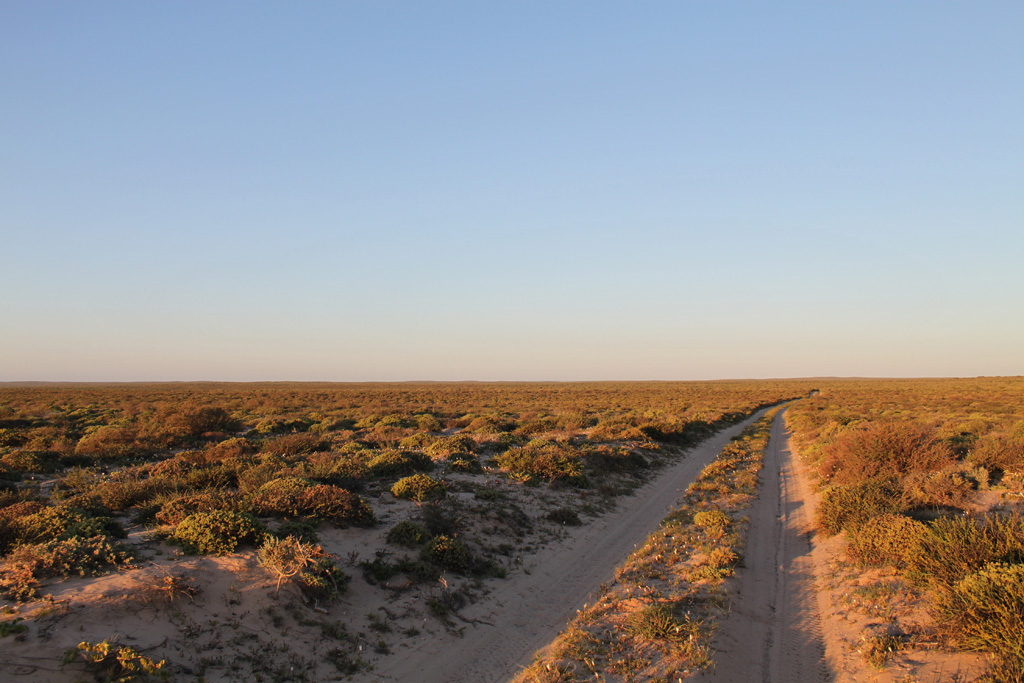
Namaqualand, outside of the flower season

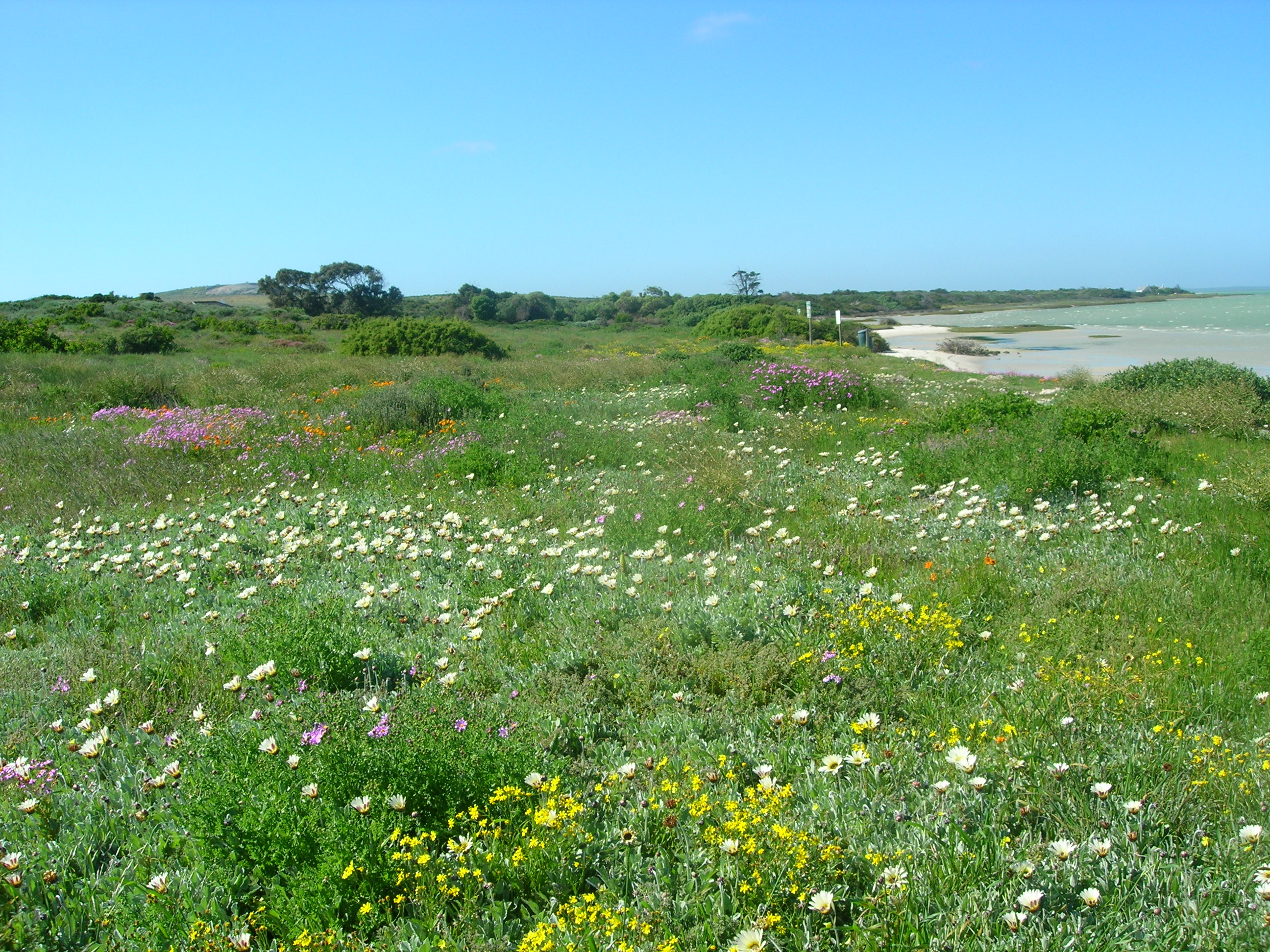
The spring flowers in Namaqualand

Namaqualand (Khoikhoi: "Nama-kwa" meaning Nama Khoi people's land) is an arid region of Namibia and South Africa, extending along the west coast over 1,000 km (600 mi) and covering a total area of 440,000 km^{2} (170,000 sq mi). It is divided by the lower course of the Orange River into two portions – Little Namaqualand to the south and Great Namaqualand to the north.

Little Namaqualand is within the Namakwa District Municipality, forming part of Northern Cape Province, South Africa. It is geographically the largest district in the country, spanning over 26,836 km^{2}. A typical municipality is Kamiesberg Local Municipality. The semidesert Succulent Karoo region experiences hot summers, sparse rainfall, and cold winters.

Great Namaqualand, in the Karas Region of Namibia, is sparsely populated by the Nama, a Khoikhoi people who have traditionally inhabited the Namaqualand region.

== Tourism ==
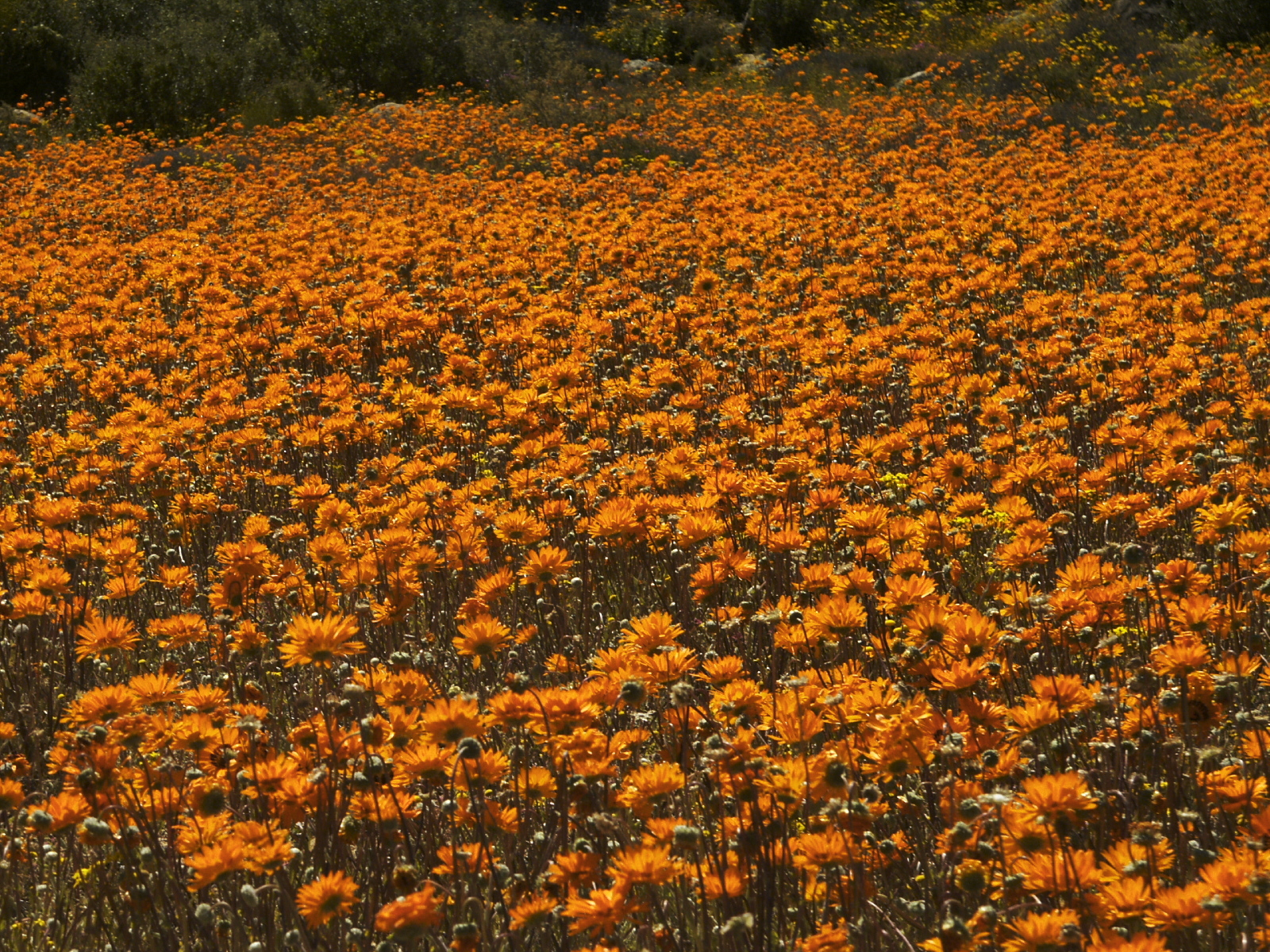
Goegap Nature Reserve

The area’s landscape ranges from an unexploited coastal strip in the west to semidesert areas in the north-east. Famed for its proximity to the Atlantic Ocean, its wild flowers during spring, its wealth of minerals, and cultural history, Namaqualand is a popular region for international and local tourists. The Namakwa coastline and the banks of the Orange River are popular for their hiking trails and off-roading routes.

The beginning of the flower season varies from year to year, but usually occurs between August and October. The natural landscape is continually monitored with the first sign of spring and flower season being the arrival of Namakwa daisies. When purple vygies bloom, spring is coming to an end.

The Namaqua National Park is situated west of the N7, one of South Africa's national roads. This conservation area is a great biodiversity hotspot, with the highest concentration of succulent plants of any of the world's arid regions. More than a thousand of its estimated 3500 floral species cannot be found anywhere else in the world.

The Ai-Ais/Richtersveld Transfrontier Park, on the border of Namibia and South Africa, was known as the Richtersveld National Park in South Africa and the Ai-Ais Hot Springs Game Park in Namibia before the two parks were formally combined in August 2003. What was once the Richtersveld National Park nurtures about 30% of South Africa’s succulent species.

== Modern settlements in the river area ==
Some of the more prominent towns in this area are Springbok, being the largest in the region, and Kleinzee and Koiingnaas, both private mining towns owned by De Beers Diamond Mines. This area is quite rich in alluvial diamonds deposited along the coast by the Orange River. Oranjemund is another mining town along this coast, situated in Namibia, but very much on the border. As the name suggests, it is at the mouth of the Orange River, which forms the border between South Africa and Namibia.

The town of Alexander Bay is located 5 km (3.1 mi) away opposite the river on the South African side and is linked to Oranjemund by the Ernest Oppenheimer Bridge. Other links crossing the river further upstream are a reintroduced pontoon at Sendelingsdrift in the Richtersveld National Park, and road bridges at Vioolsdrif (the main border crossing between the two countries) and at the remote border crossing of Onseepkans.

A vibrant fishing industry is found along this stretch of the South African west coast, especially in Port Nolloth, the major resort town of Namaqualand, and Hondeklipbaai, or Dogstonebay, called such because of a large boulder outside the town, which when viewed correctly, looks vaguely like a dog sitting down.

Since the 19th century, copper has been mined at Springbok and its surrounding towns such as Okiep, while a large mine extracting copper, lead, zinc, and silver is located at Aggeneys, 110 kilometres (70 mi) further inland.

== People ==
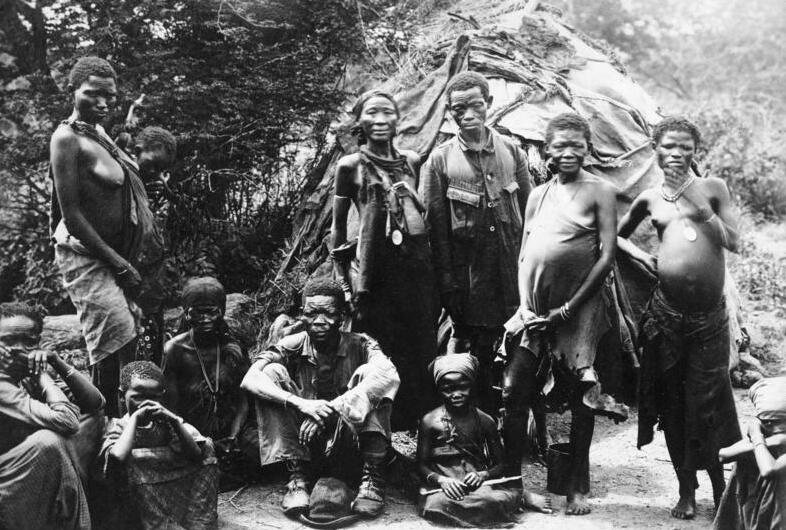
Nama group in front of a hut, circa 1910

The region is known for its cultural history, which was preserved by the Nama and Khoisan tribes. The Nama people are a group of Khoikhoi people. Around 50% of the Nama population and 80% of the neighboring Herero population were brutally killed by the German Empire between 1904 and 1907 in a racial extermination during the Herero and Nama genocide. Nama people traditionally speak the Khoekhoe language.

== Conservation ==
Community-based climate adaptation and grazing management projects in Namaqualand have been supported through the Community Adaptation Small Grants Facility, facilitated in the Namakwa area by Conservation South Africa.

== See also ==
- Letterklip
- Mafuta
- Namaqualand Railway
Other pictures

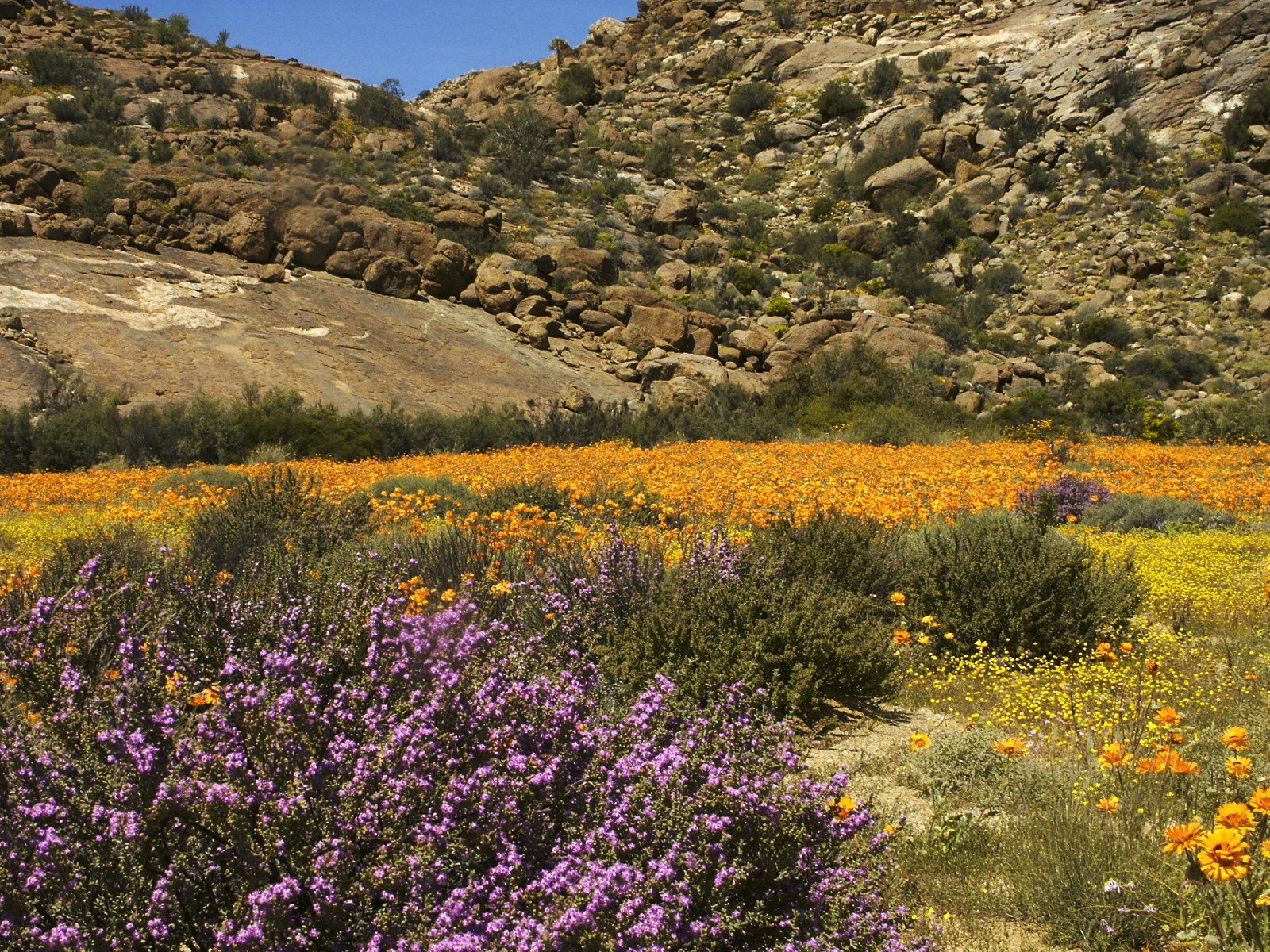
Flowering desert

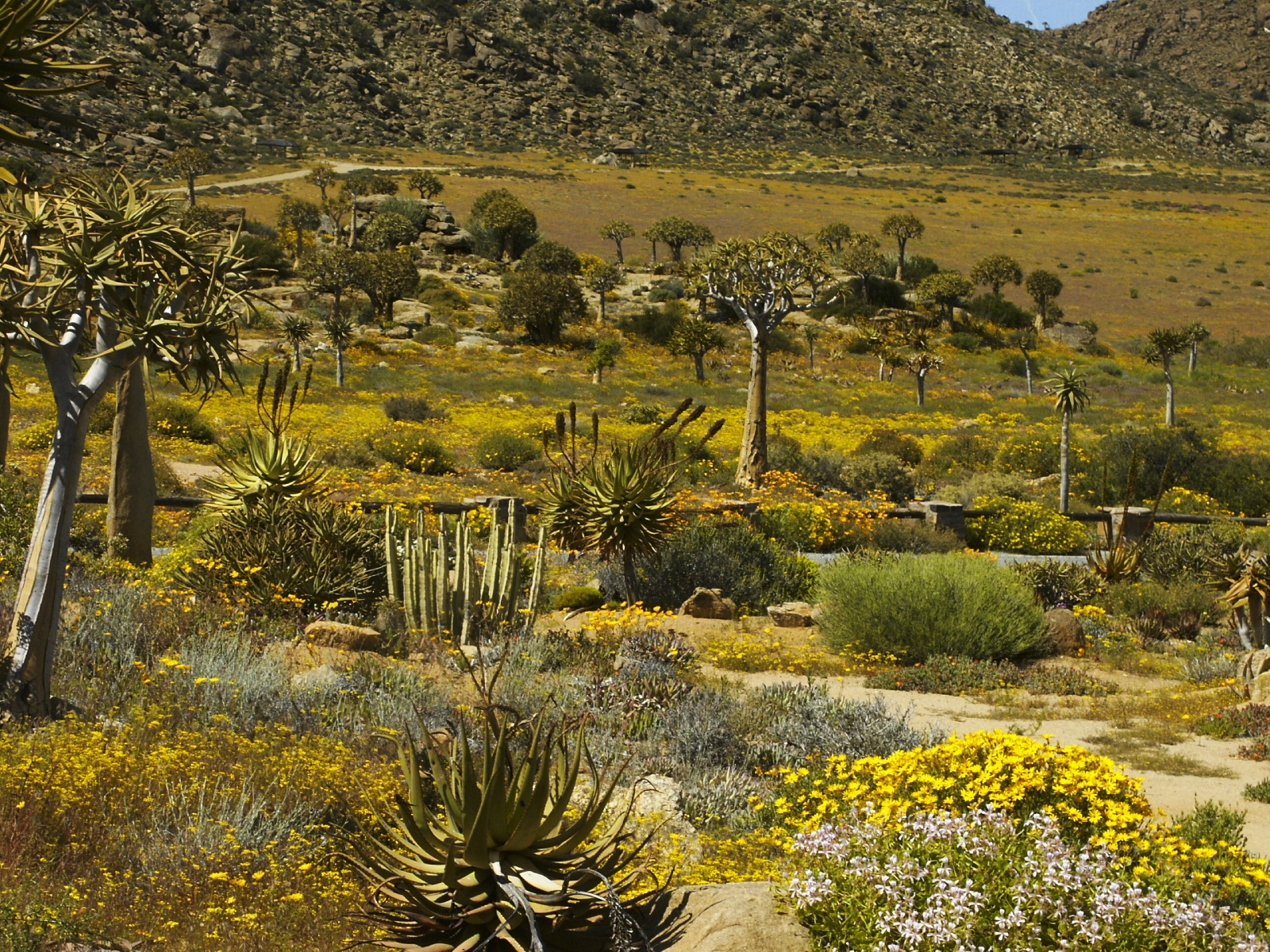
Goegap Nature Reserve

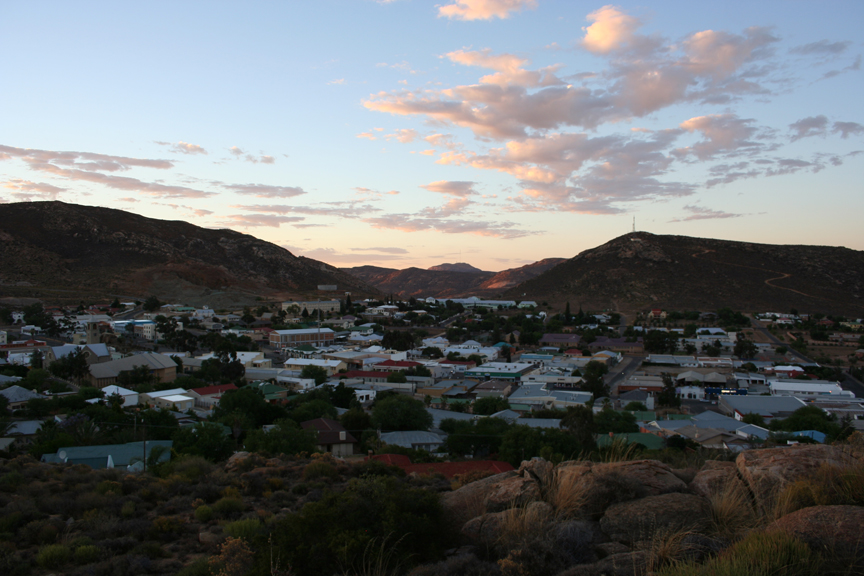
Springbok at dusk
