= Springbok, South Africa =

Springbok ǁgũǀ’aos (Khoekhoe)
- Town
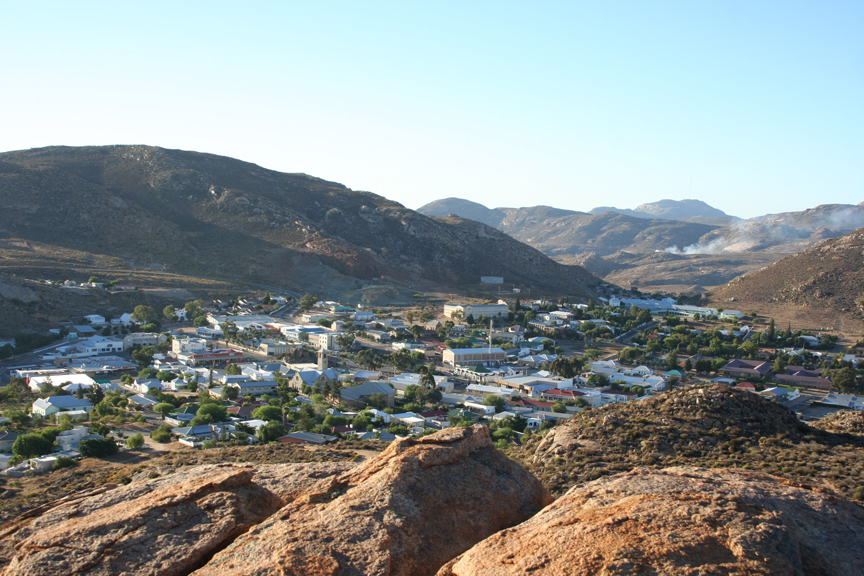
- A view of Springbok from "Klipkoppie"

- Location within Northern Cape Location within South Africa Location within Africa
- Coordinates: 29°40′S 17°53′E
- Country: South Africa
- Province: Northern Cape
- District: Namakwa
- Municipality: Nama Khoi

Area
  - Total: 37.56 km^{2} (14.50 sq mi)
- Elevation: 950 m (3,120 ft)

Population (2011)
  - Total: 12,790
  - Density: 340.5/km^{2} (881.9/sq mi)

Racial makeup (2011)
  - Black African: 4.1%
  - Coloured: 79.9%
  - Indian/Asian: 0.5%
  - White: 14.7%
  - Other: 0.7%

First languages (2011)
  - Afrikaans: 95.1%
  - English: 1.7%
  - Other: 3.2%
- Time zone: UTC+2 (SAST)
- Postal code (street): 8240
- PO box: 8240
- Area code: 027

Springbok (Khoekhoe: ǁgũǀ’aos) is the largest town in the Namaqualand area in the Northern Cape province of South Africa. It was called Springbokfontein until 1911, when it was shortened to Springbok. Springbok is located on the N7 national route which connects the Cape with Namibia, and at the western end of the N14, which connects it with Upington and Pretoria. It is the main town of the Nama Khoi Local Municipality, which also includes a number of surrounding towns such as Okiep and Nababeep.

The town lies at an elevation of 1,007 metres (3,304 feet) in a narrow valley between the high granite domes of the Klein Koperberge (Small Copper Mountains). This name gives away the reason for the early settlement which gradually turned into a major commercial and administrative centre for copper mining operations in the region. While the town initially developed rapidly, this slowed when rich copper deposits were discovered in Okiep. As the main source of water, Springbok continued to develop as the commercial and administrative centre for different mines in the area. Even though mining activities have dwindled, the town remains an important administrative capital in the region and due to its location a favourite stopover for tourists on their way to Namibia. Today the main income is generated from tourism, mining activities, commerce and farming.

As of 2011, the small town which covers an area of 37.56 km², had a population of 12 790. Coloured people make up 79.9% of its residents with Afrikaans being the most widely spoken language.

== Ecology ==
Springbok experiences low levels of air humidity, limited soil moisture and severe sunshine throughout the year. This often arid area is home to seasonal vegetation and drought resistant succulents like the kokerboom which have adapted to the harsh conditions to survive.

Despite the dry environment, this area experiences high floral diversity—almost half of the plant species in Springbok are found nowhere else in the world.

When the winter rain falls, the Goegap Nature Reserve, home to the Hester Malan Wild Flower Garden, with outcrops of granite, is covered in spring flowers like irises and orchids.

The streets lead off from a central little koppie (hill) featuring Namaqualand’s strange flora, such as the almost leafless Quiver tree whose branches were used by San people for their arrows. This area is famed for the transformation which occurs every spring, when the near-lifeless scrubland explodes into colour from thousands of flowers hidden in the dry dusty earth, brought to life by winter rains.

Springbok hosts a field office of Conservation South Africa, which works in the wider Namakwa District on biodiversity-linked rural development and landscape management.

== History ==
The town was founded on the farm Melkboschkuil when the farm was acquired from Kowie Cloete for £750 (£573,000 or ZAR6,705,520 in 2010) in 1852 so as to establish a copper mine. In 1862 the town of Springbokfontein was laid out. The -fontein (fountain) was dropped in later years.

The "Klipkoppie" was used during the Second Boer War as a fort by the Boers under General Manie Maritz as it provided an excellent vantage point across the valley. Remains of stone walls inside the koppie can still be seen today. Next to the "Klipkoppie" is the beautiful Klipkerk (Stone Church) which was built in 1921, under the leadership of Rev. Willem Petrus Steenkamp, who served as minister of the Dutch Reformed congregation.

The following year, in 1922, the Namaqualand Hebrew Congregation was established in Springbok to serve the Jewish families there and the surrounding settlements, including Okiep and Nababeep. Members of the congregation included merchants and civic leaders such as Joe Jowell, who served as mayor of Springbok for approximately 27 years.

== Tourism ==
The town’s mining history, flora and connection to the Second Boer War makes it a rich hub of natural and cultural heritage. It is still widely used as a stopover for those travelling between South Africa and Namibia.

Monument Koppie, a small hill situated in the centre of the town, remains a historical site and landmark. While most of this area was destroyed by dynamite, planted by a commando, led by General Jan Smuts, some of the remains still stand today.

Copper was first discovered in the area by the Governor of the Cape, Simon van der Stel, in 1685. Blue Mine is believed to mark the origins of commercial mining in South Africa. The area has a blue tinge formed when copper reacts with oxygen in the air.

The Goegap Nature Reserve, south-east of the main town, is a conservation area that gets covered in spring flowers. It also the home of several mammalian species like springbok, gemsbok and aardwolf. Throughout the year tourists visit for hikes and mountain biking on the trails and routes across the tranquil land.

== Climate ==
Springbok has a warm semi-arid climate (Köppen: BSh) with hot, dry summers, mild winters, and ample sunshine throughout the year.

Climate data for Springbok, elevation 1,006 m (3,301 ft), (1991–2020 normals, extremes 1999–2023)
Month	Jan	Feb	Mar	Apr	May	Jun	Jul	Aug	Sep	Oct	Nov	Dec	Year
Record high °C (°F)	39.3 (102.7)	39.3 (102.7)	37.9 (100.2)	35.8 (96.4)	32.3 (90.1)	28.6 (83.5)	27.9 (82.2)	31.5 (88.7)	34.2 (93.6)	38.3 (100.9)	39.5 (103.1)	39.4 (102.9)	39.5 (103.1)
Mean daily maximum °C (°F)	29.5 (85.1)	30.0 (86.0)	28.8 (83.8)	25.3 (77.5)	21.3 (70.3)	17.3 (63.1)	17.2 (63.0)	17.8 (64.0)	21.3 (70.3)	24.3 (75.7)	26.0 (78.8)	27.9 (82.2)	23.9 (75.0)
Daily mean °C (°F)	23.0 (73.4)	23.5 (74.3)	22.7 (72.9)	19.9 (67.8)	16.5 (61.7)	13.0 (55.4)	12.7 (54.9)	12.9 (55.2)	15.5 (59.9)	17.9 (64.2)	19.4 (66.9)	21.2 (70.2)	18.1 (64.6)
Mean daily minimum °C (°F)	16.3 (61.3)	17.0 (62.6)	16.6 (61.9)	14.4 (57.9)	11.7 (53.1)	8.8 (47.8)	8.3 (46.9)	7.8 (46.0)	9.6 (49.3)	11.5 (52.7)	12.7 (54.9)	14.5 (58.1)	12.4 (54.3)
Record low °C (°F)	6.0 (42.8)	7.1 (44.8)	4.4 (39.9)	3.8 (38.8)	1.4 (34.5)	0.3 (32.5)	0.1 (32.2)	−1.4 (29.5)	−1.4 (29.5)	−0.8 (30.6)	3.2 (37.8)	4.9 (40.8)	−1.4 (29.5)
Average precipitation mm (inches)	9.4 (0.37)	7.0 (0.28)	13.5 (0.53)	14.5 (0.57)	24.8 (0.98)	37.4 (1.47)	33.0 (1.30)	28.5 (1.12)	16.4 (0.65)	10.0 (0.39)	11.9 (0.47)	3.7 (0.15)	210.1 (8.27)
Average precipitation days	1.2	1.1	1.4	2.4	2.9	4.6	3.9	4.2	2.8	1.8	2.0	1.1	29.4
Mean monthly sunshine hours	371.2	325.8	325.3	286.2	264.3	226.1	252.8	283.2	282.8	328.1	338.6	374.1	3,648.4
Source 1: NOAA
Source 2: Starlings Roost Weather (extremes)

== Gallery ==
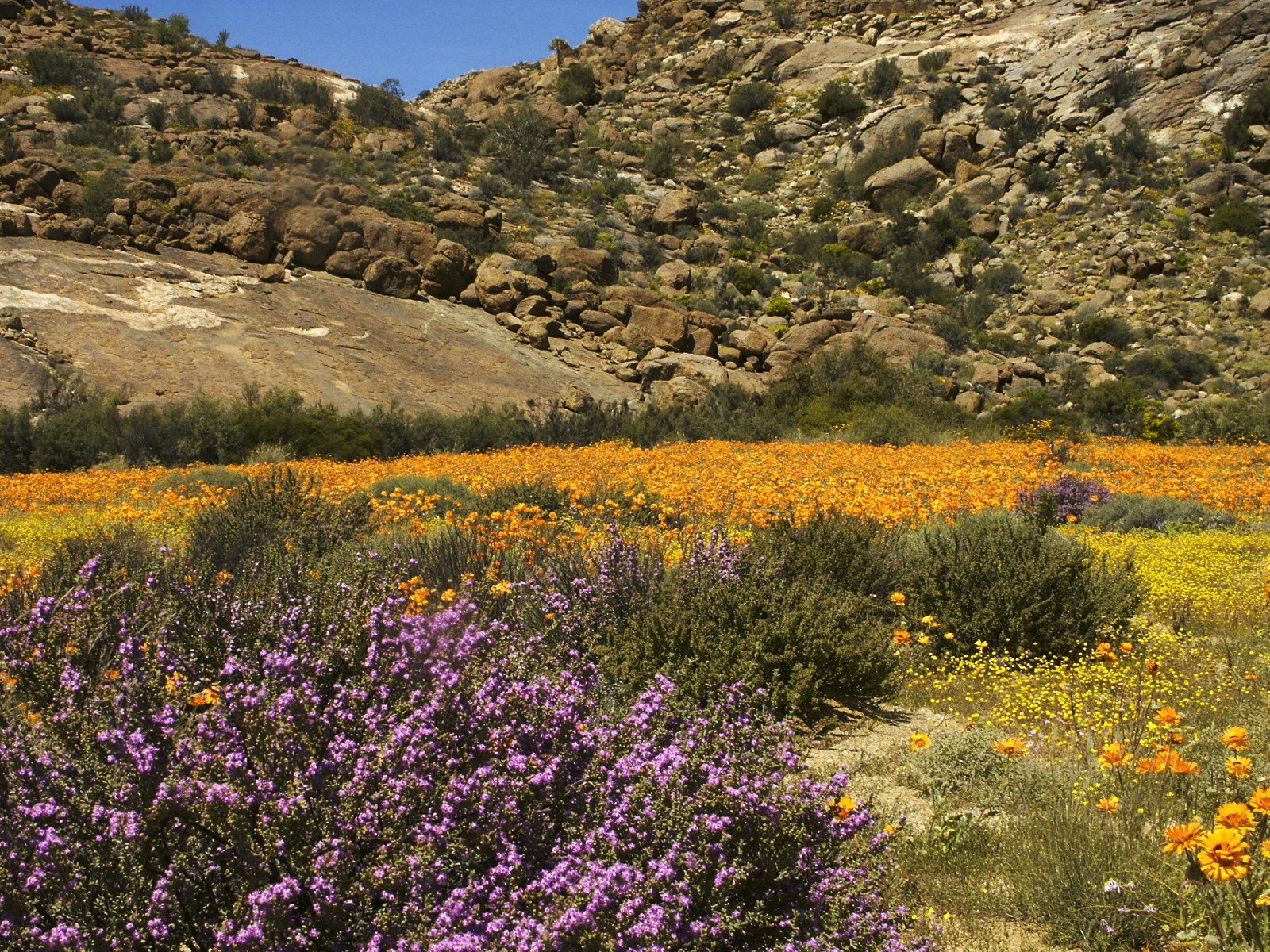
Flowering Desert

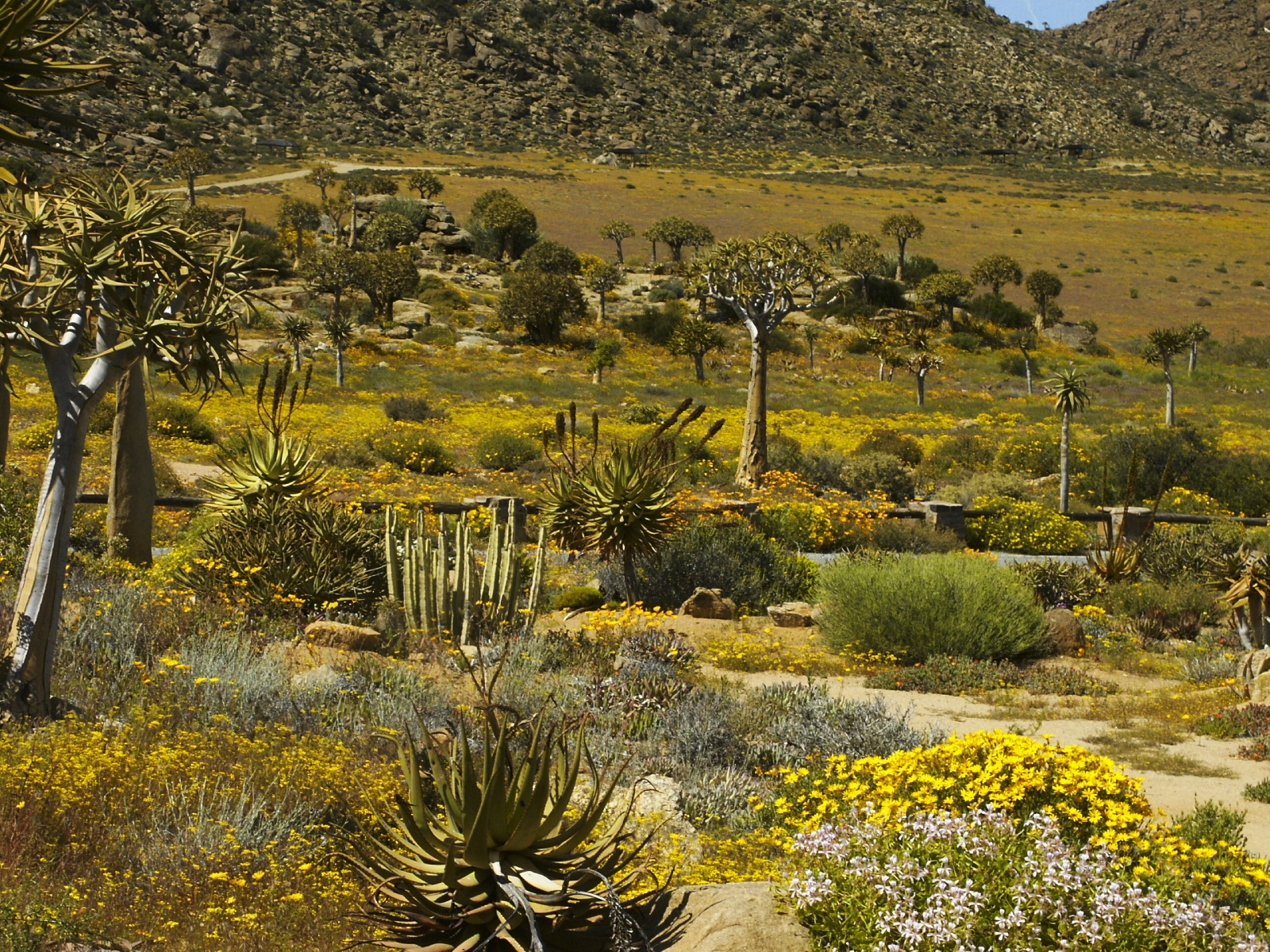
Goegap Nature Reserve

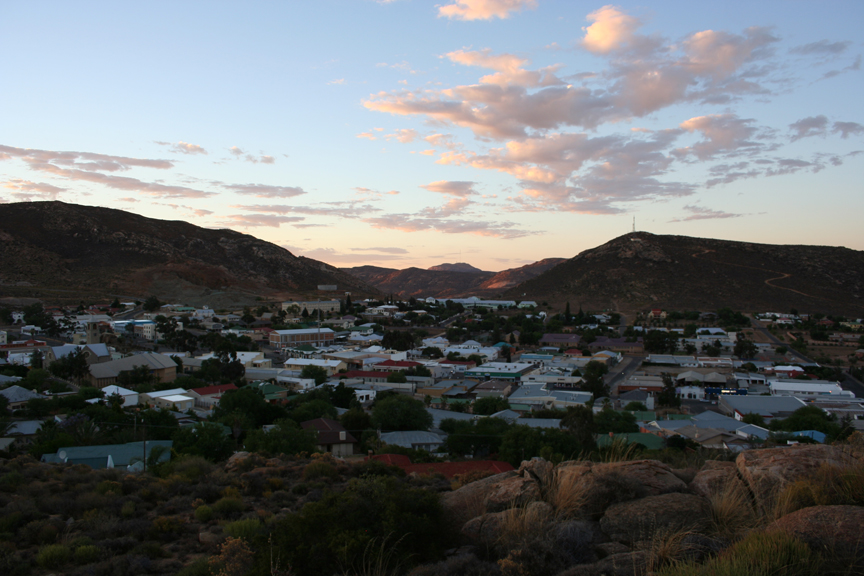
Springbok at dusk

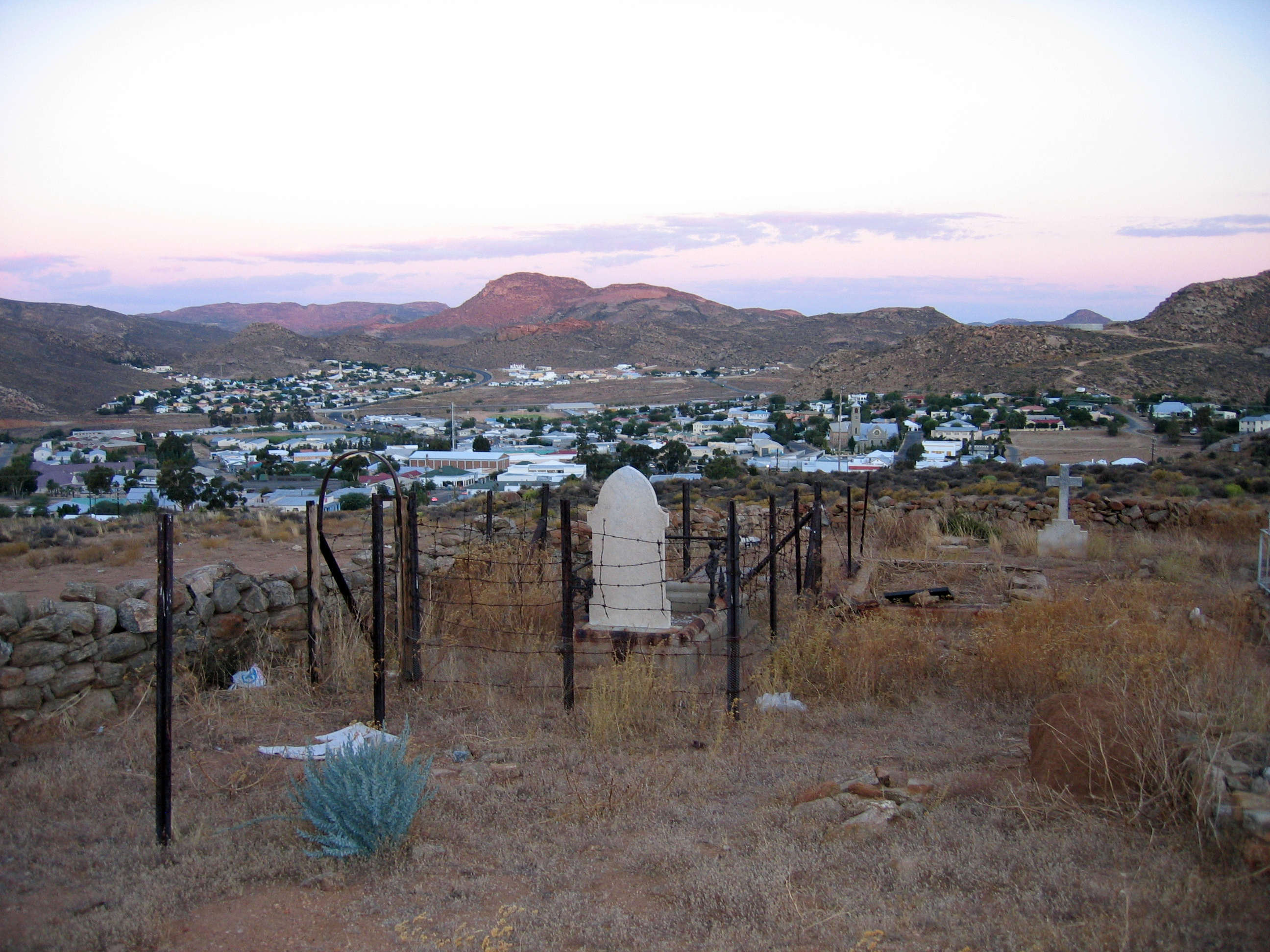
Springbok from the old cemetery

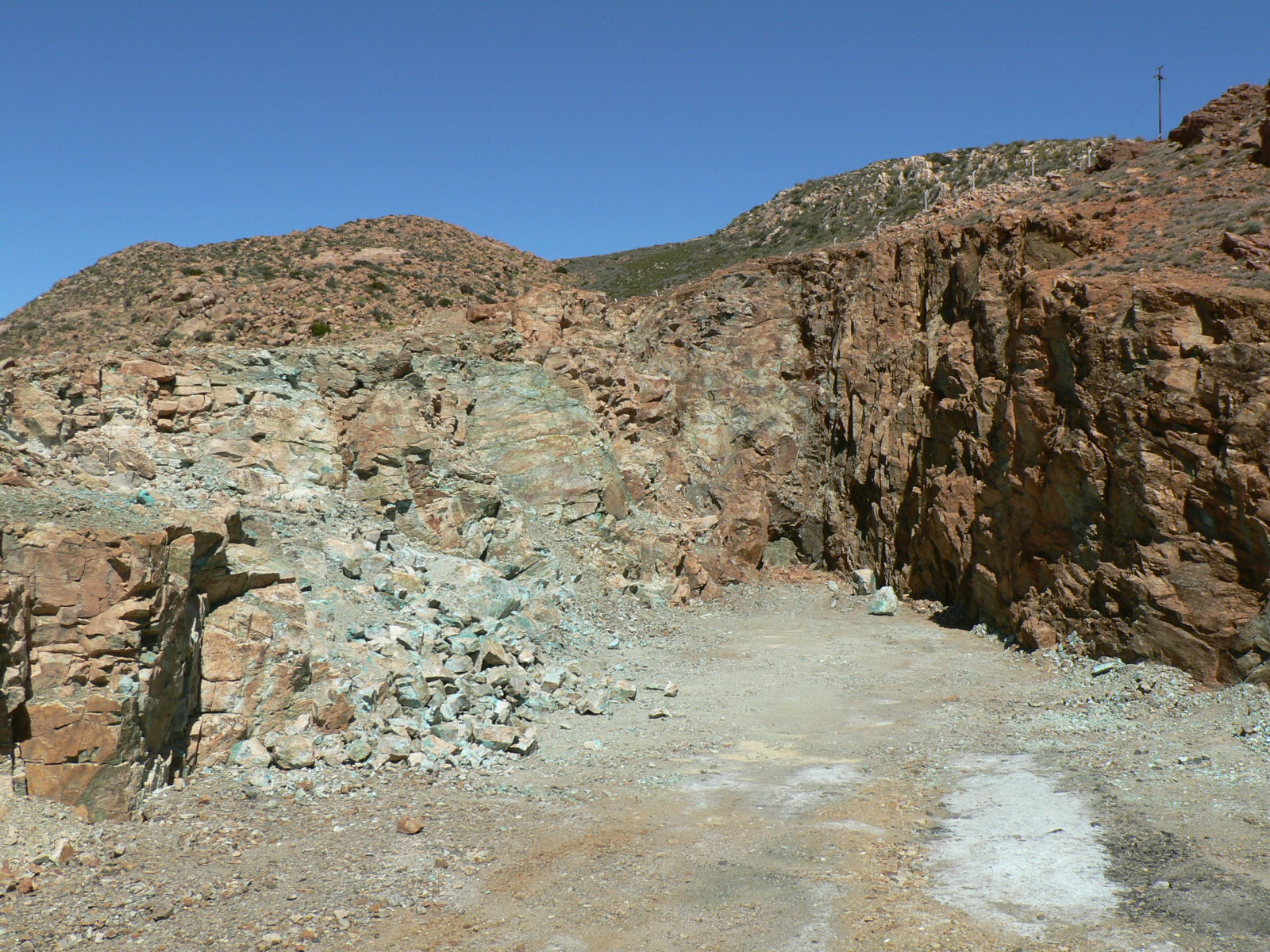
Blue Mine, Springbok

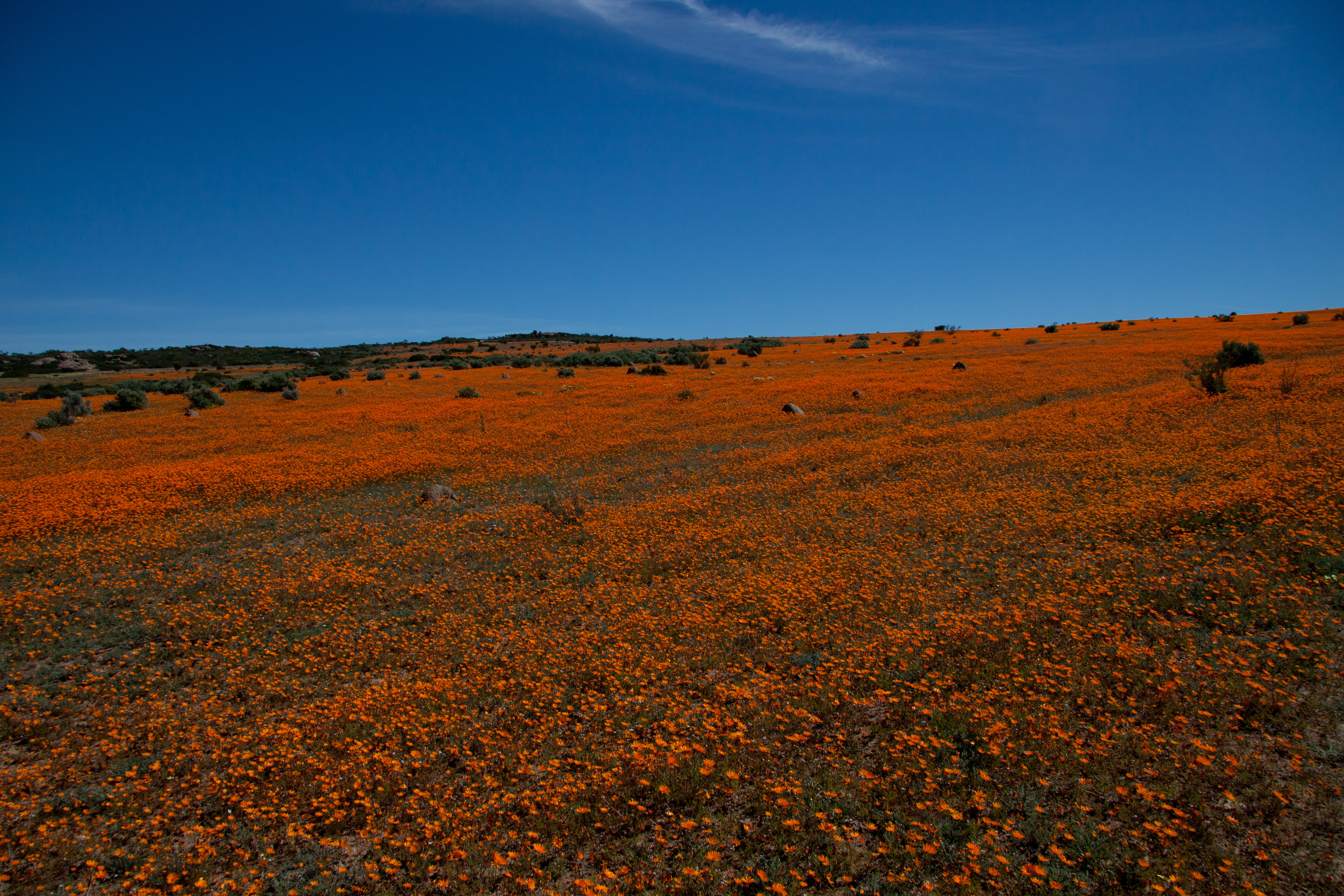
Namaqua NP3

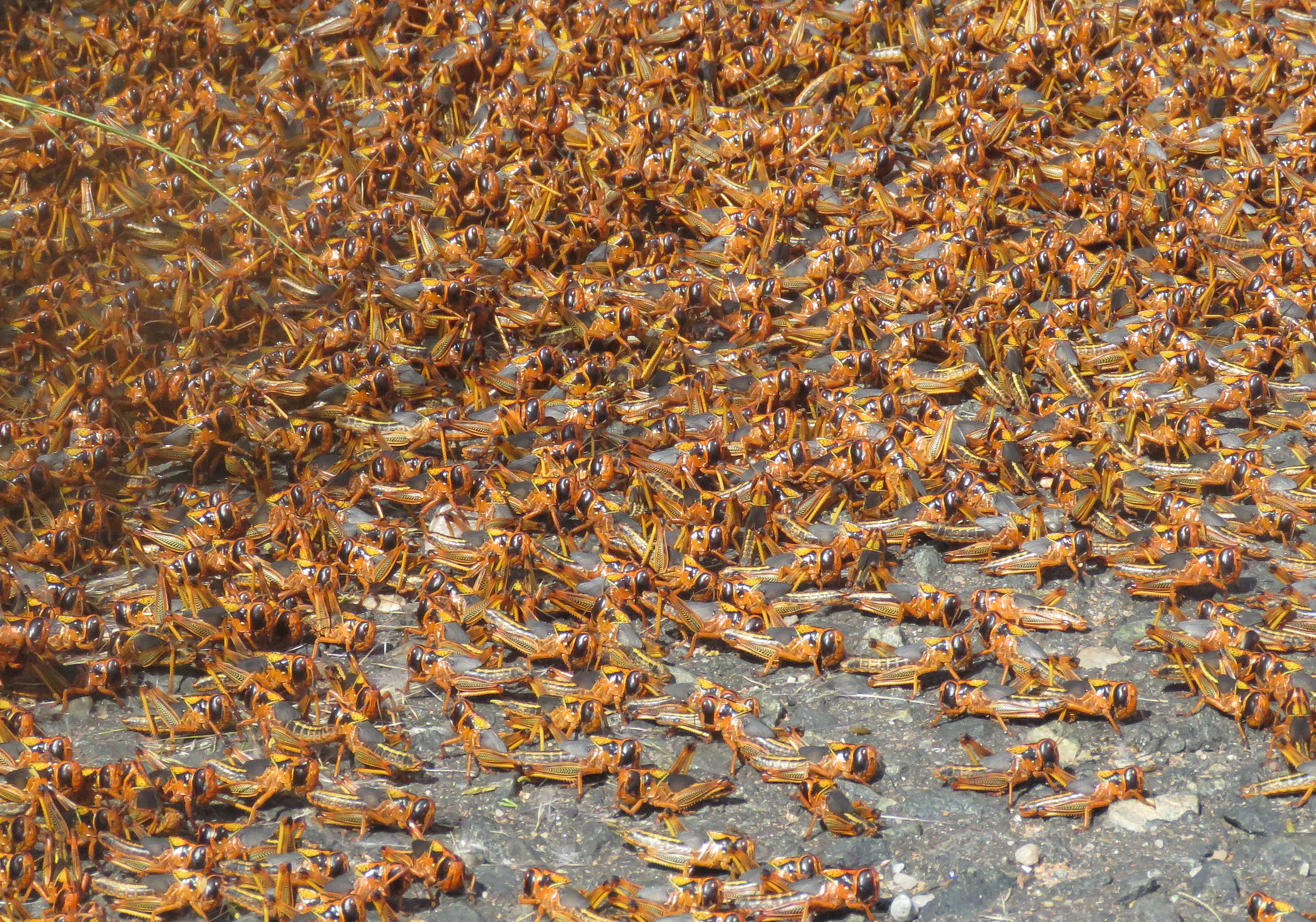
Swarm of wingless locusts between Riemvasmaak and Springbok

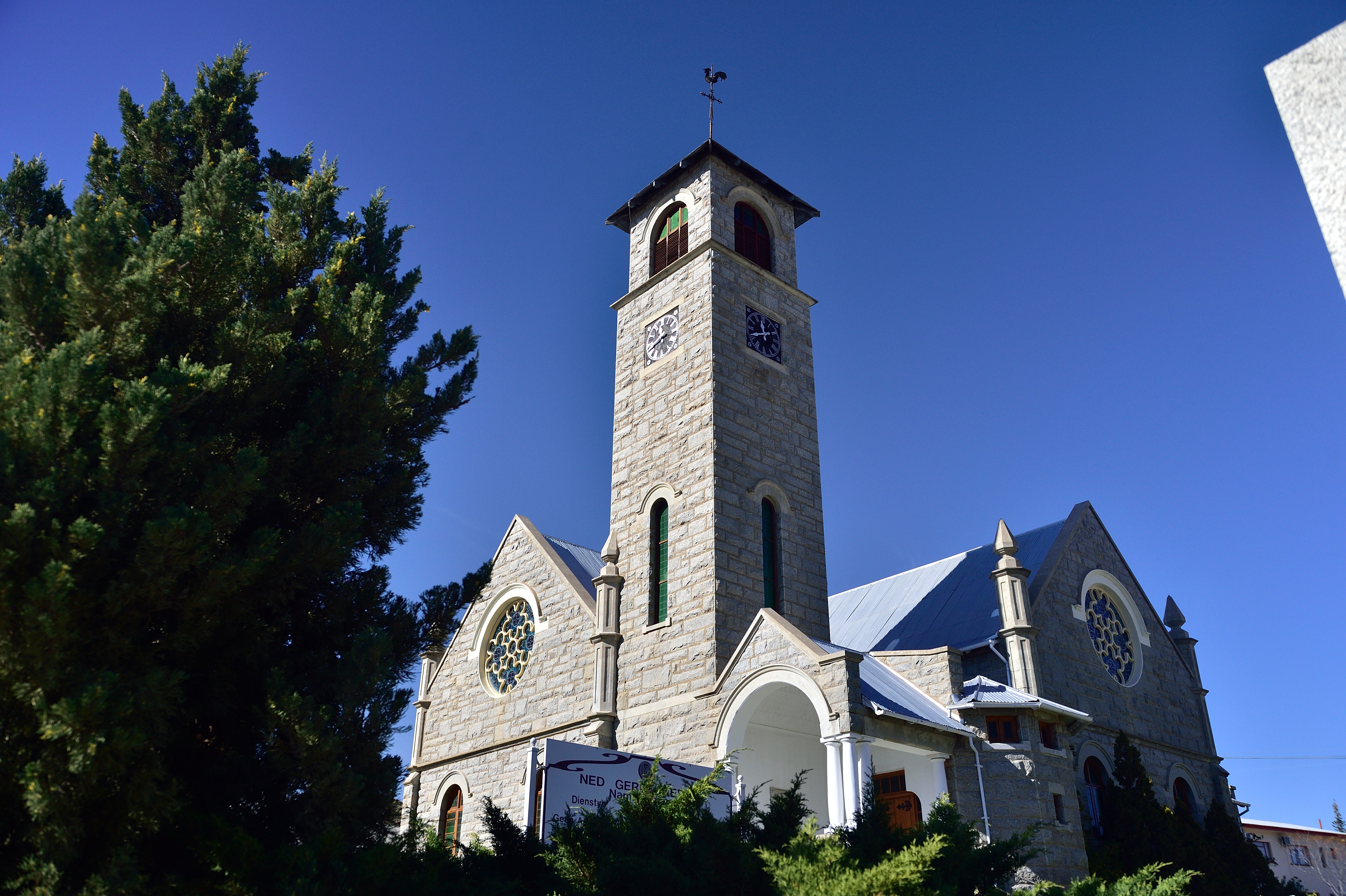
Dutch Reformed Church, Springbok

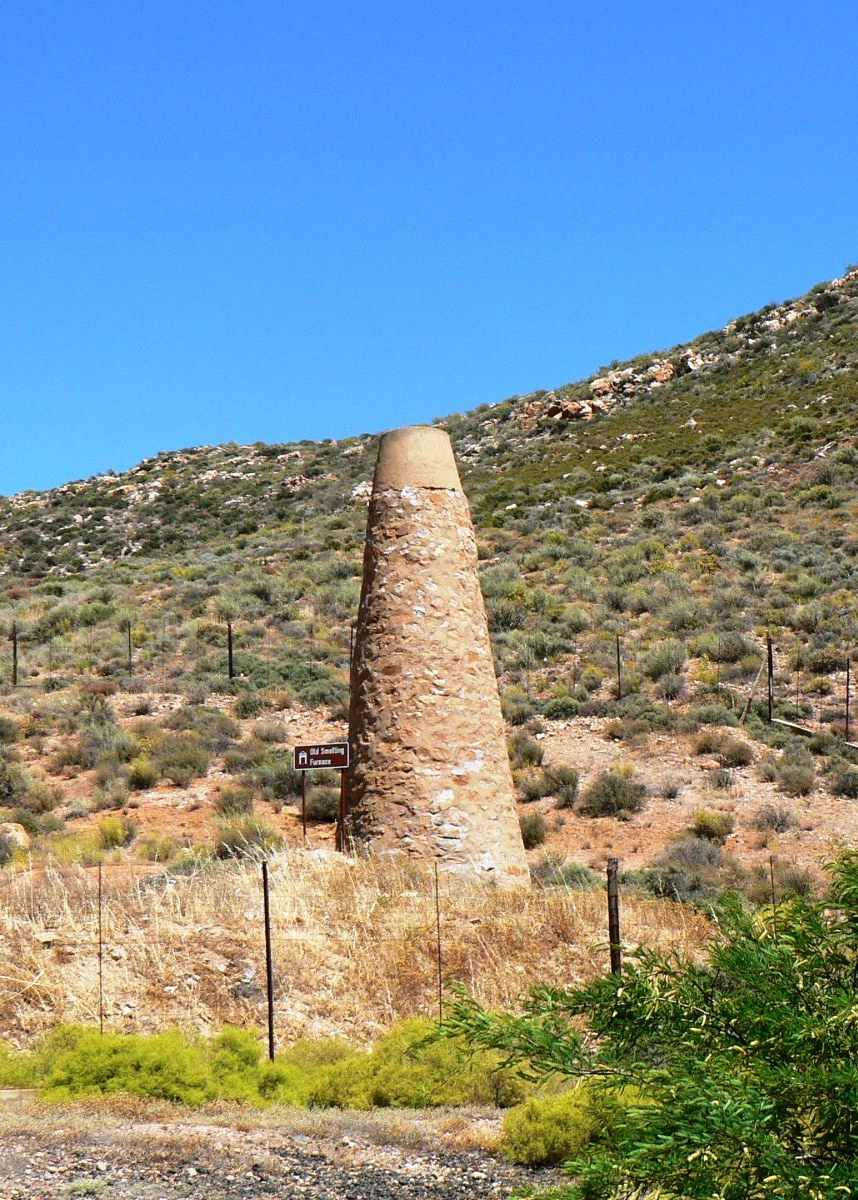
Springbok western cape Wikivoyage Banner
