= Namakwa District Municipality =

District municipality in Northern Cape, South Africa

Namakwa
- District municipality
- Seal

- Location in South Africa
- Coordinates: 30°30′S 19°30′E
- Country: South Africa
- Province: Northern Cape
- Seat: Springbok
- Local municipalities: List: Richtersveld; Nama Khoi; Kamiesberg; Hantam; Karoo Hoogland; Khâi-Ma

Government
  - Type: Municipal council
  - Executive Mayor: Alinda Beukes

Area
  - Total: 126,836 km^{2} (48,972 sq mi)

Population (2011)
  - Total: 115,842
  - Density: 0.913321/km^{2} (2.36549/sq mi)

Racial makeup (2011)
  - Coloured: 83.2%
  - White: 8.7%
  - Black African: 6.8%
  - Indian/Asian: 0.5%

First languages (2011)
  - Afrikaans: 93.9%
  - Tswana: 1.7%
  - Xhosa: 1.5%
  - English: 1.2%
  - Other: 1.7%
- Time zone: UTC+2 (SAST)
- Municipal code: DC6

The Namakwa District Municipality (Afrikaans: Namakwa-distriksmunisipaliteit) is one of the 5 districts of the Northern Cape province of South Africa. The seat of Namakwa is Springbok and the region is also known as Little Namaqualand. As of 2011, a majority of its 108,118 residents speak Afrikaans. The district code is DC6.

Community-based climate-adaptation projects in the district have been supported through the Community Adaptation Small Grants Facility, with Conservation South Africa serving as the Namakwa facilitating agency.

== Geography ==
=== Neighbours ===
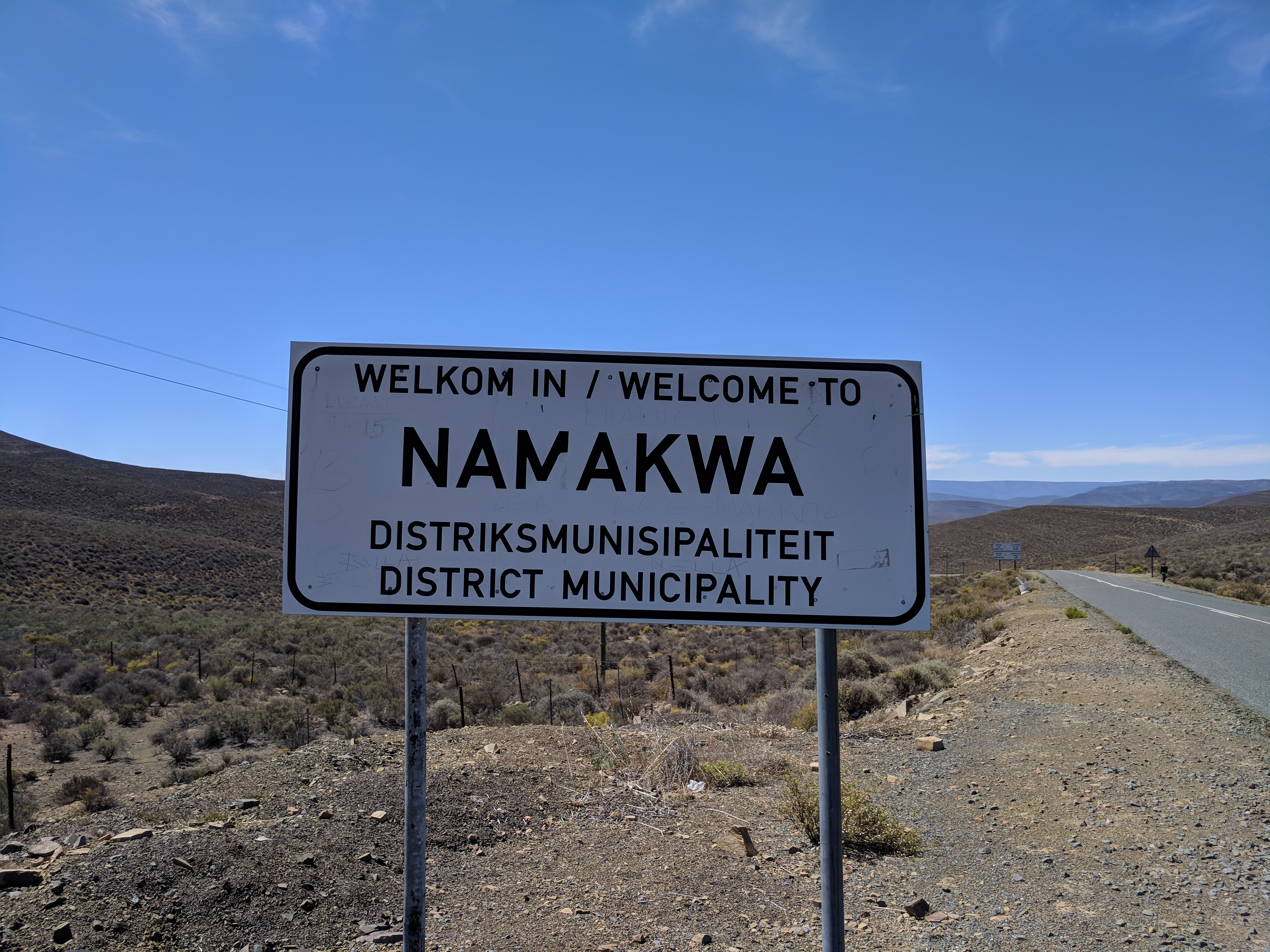
A sign along the border of Namakwa with the Western Cape, welcoming drivers coming up R354

Namakwa is surrounded by:

- the republic of Namibia in the north
- ZF Mgcawu (DC8) in the north-east
- Pixley ka Seme (DC7) in the east
- Central Karoo (DC5) in the south-east
- Cape Winelands (DC2) – in the south (formerly the Boland District Municipality)
- West Coast (DC1) in the south-west
- the Atlantic Ocean in the west

=== Local municipalities ===
The district contains the following local municipalities:

Local municipality	Population	%
Nama Khoi	44 752	41.39%
Hantam	19 804	18.32%
Khâi-Ma	11 348	10.50%
Kamiesberg	10 743	9.94%
Karoo Hoogland	10 508	9.72%
Richtersveld	10 119	9.36%
Namaqualand	813	0.75%

== Demographics ==
The following statistics are from the 2001 census.

Language	Population	%
Afrikaans	103,304	95.55%
Xhosa	1 595	1.48%
Tswana	1 211	1.12%
English	1 143	1.06%
Other	415	0.38%
Sotho	219	0.20%
Zulu	116	0.11%
Tsonga	26	0.02%
Northern Sotho	18	0.02%
Venda	16	0.01%
Swati	15	0.01%
Ndebele	9	0.01%

=== Gender ===
Gender	Population	%
Female	54 651	50.55%
Male	53 467	49.45%

=== Ethnic group ===
Ethnic group	Population	%
Coloured	90 713	83.90%
White	12 757	11.80%
Black African	4 523	4.18%
Indian/Asian	125	0.12%

=== Age ===
Age	Population	%
000–004	9 990	9.24%
005–009	10 690	9.89%
010–014	11 028	10.20%
015–019	9 809	9.07%
020–024	8 212	7.60%
025–029	8 367	7.74%
030–034	8 647	8.00%
035–039	8 086	7.48%
040–044	6 996	6.47%
045–049	6 387	5.91%
050–054	4 971	4.60%
055–059	4 232	3.91%
060–064	3 437	3.18%
065–069	2 671	2.47%
070–074	1 929	1.78%
075–079	1 216	1.12%
080–084	786	0.73%
085–089	453	0.42%
090–094	165	0.15%
095–099	43	0.04%
100 plus	3	0.00%

== Politics ==
=== Election results ===
Election results for Namakwa in the South African general election, 2004.

- Population 18 and over: 70 397 [65.11% of total population]
- Total votes: 44 220 [40.90% of total population]
- Voting % estimate: 62.82% votes as a % of population 18 and over

Party	Votes	%
African National Congress	26 557	60.06%
Democratic Alliance	7 104	16.07%
New National Party	4 379	9.90%
Independent Democrats	4 216	9.53%
African Christian Democratic Party	867	1.96%
Freedom Front Plus	536	1.21%
Pan Africanist Congress	75	0.17%
United Democratic Movement	63	0.14%
United Christian Democratic Party	54	0.12%
Inkhata Freedom Party	49	0.11%
NA	42	0.09%
EMSA	39	0.09%
PJC	38	0.09%
KISS	37	0.08%
Azanian People's Organisation	34	0.08%
CDP	28	0.06%
SOPA	27	0.06%
TOP	23	0.05%
NLP	20	0.05%
UF	18	0.04%
Minority Front	14	0.03%
Total	44 220	100.00%
