= Namaqualand (disambiguation) =

The Namaqualand is an arid region of Namibia and South Africa.

Namaqualand may also refer to:

- Namaqualand Daisy
- Namaqualand Daisies, a South Africa field hockey club
- Namaqualand Railway

== Locomotives ==
- Namaqualand 0-4-0WT Condenser
- Namaqualand 0-4-2IST Caledonia
- Namaqualand 0-4-2ST Pioneer
- Namaqualand 0-4-2T Britannia
- Namaqualand 0-6-0T 1871
- Namaqualand 0-6-2 Clara Class
- Namaqualand 0-6-2 Scotia Class

== See also ==
- Namaqua (disambiguation)
