= Namaqualand 0-4-2T Britannia =

Type of steam locomotive

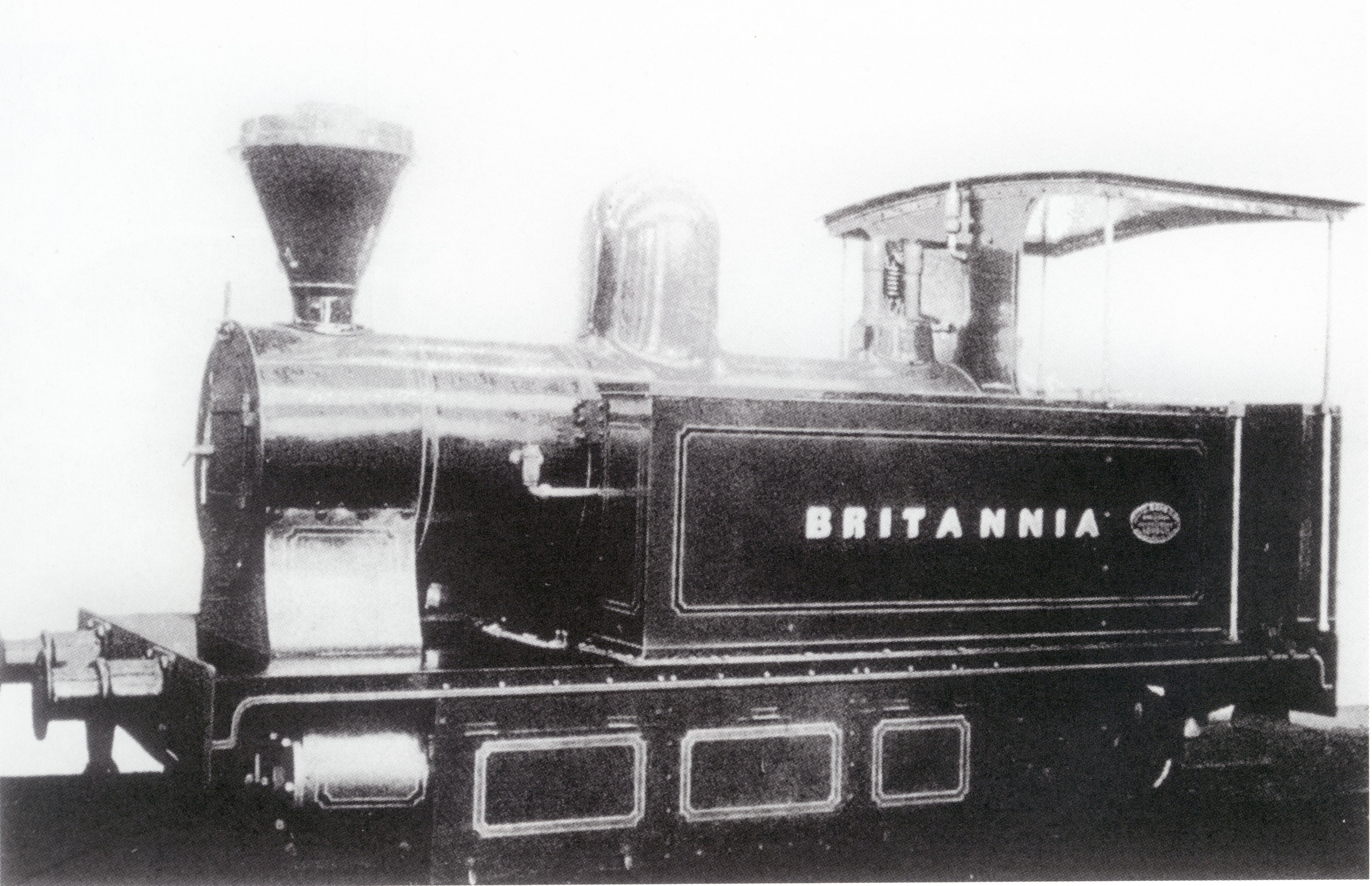
- Cape Copper Company 0-4-2T Britannia, c. 1905
Type and origin
- Power type: Steam
- Designer: Dick, Kerr & Company
- Builder: Dick, Kerr & Company
- Build date: 1905
Specifications
- Configuration
  - Whyte: 0-4-2T (Olomana)
  - UIC: B1n2t
- Gauge: 2 ft 6 in (762 mm) Namaqualand
- Loco weight: 11 or 12 LT (11,180 or 12,190 kg)
- Firebox
  - Type: Round-top
- Safety valve: Ramsbottom
- Cylinders: Two
- Cylinder size: 8 in (203 mm) bore 11 in (279 mm) stroke
- Couplers: Buffers-and-chain
Career
- Operators: Cape Copper Company; South African Copper Company; O'okiep Copper Company
- Number in class: 1
- Numbers: 13
- Official name: Britannia
- Delivered: May 1905
- First run: 1905

The Cape Copper Company 0-4-2T Britannia of 1905 was a South African steam locomotive from the pre-Union era in the Cape of Good Hope.

In 1905, a single 0-4-2 tank locomotive was placed in service by the Cape Copper Company as a shunting engine at Port Nolloth in the Cape of Good Hope.

== Namaqualand Railway ==
The Namaqualand Railway was constructed between 1869 and 1876 by the Cape Copper Mining Company, restructured as the Cape Copper Company in 1888. The railway from Port Nolloth on the West Coast to the copper mines around O'okiep was initially exclusively mule-powered, but in 1871 the first experimental steam locomotives named John King and Miner were acquired by the mining company.

They were followed, between 1886 and 1888, by three 0-4-0WT condensing locomotives and, between 1890 and 1904, by eight 0-6-2 Clara Class and Scotia Class Mountain type tender locomotives. A single 0-4-2IST locomotive named Caledonia entered shunting service in 1904.

== The Britannia ==
In 1905, a single 0-4-2 tank locomotive named Britannia was acquired as an additional shunting locomotive from Dick, Kerr & Company of Kilmarnock in Scotland. Apart from being named, it was also numbered 13 on the Cape Copper Company locomotive roster. The locomotive was landed at Port Nolloth in May 1905 and was placed in shunting service at the port.

Like the inverted saddle-tank shunting locomotive Caledonia from the same builder, the engine Britannia had a balloon chimney. In addition, it was equipped with sheet-metal casing below the running boards to protect the motion and bearings from wind-blown sand. The encasement was hinged to allow easy access to the motion.

== Illustration ==
At some stage during its career, the balloon chimney was replaced with a stovepipe chimney and the casing covering the wheels and motion was removed. The accompanying two photographs show the locomotive in this modified form.

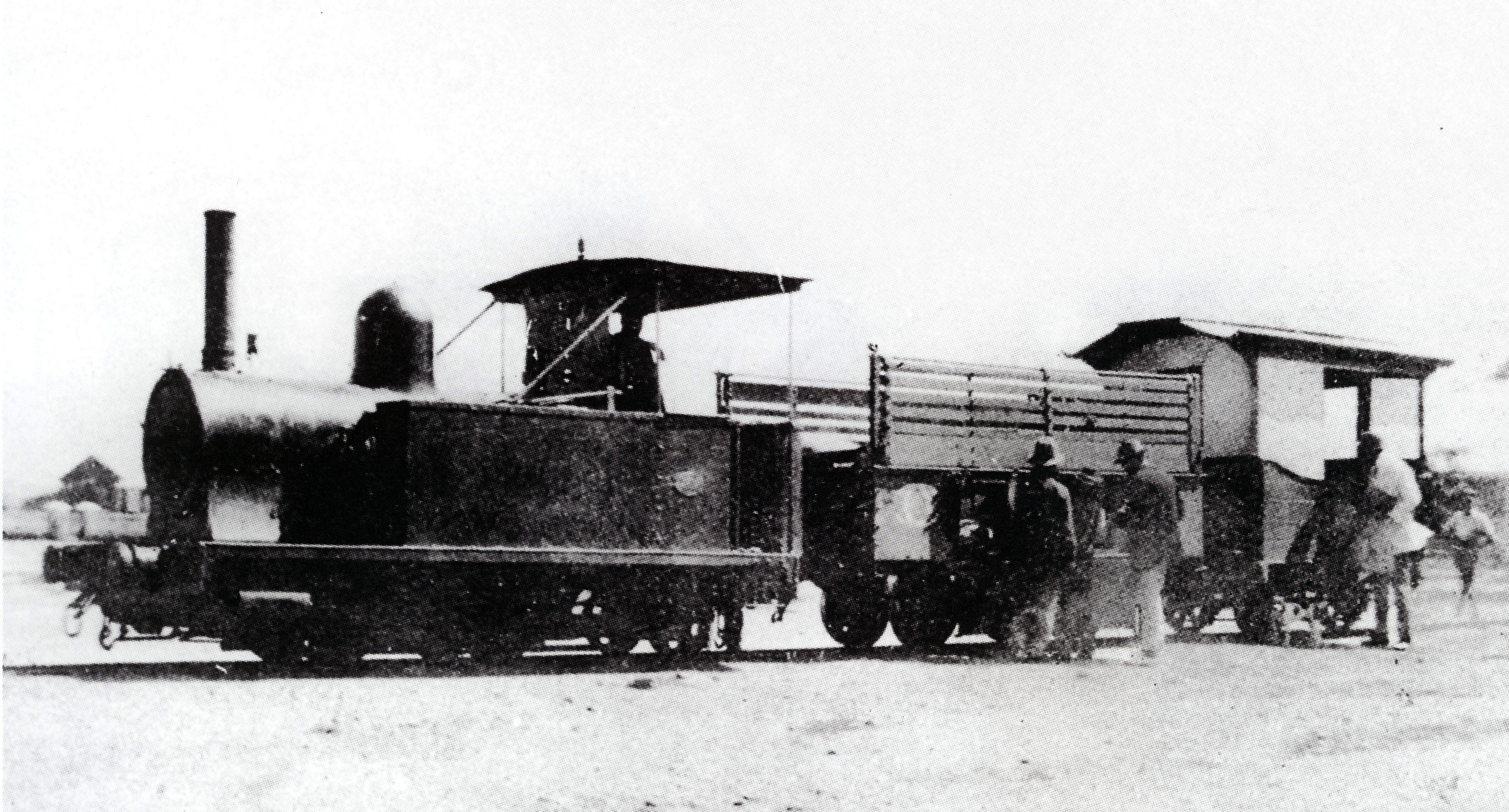
Britannia on the Namaqua Copper Company branch line between Braakpits Junction and Concordia

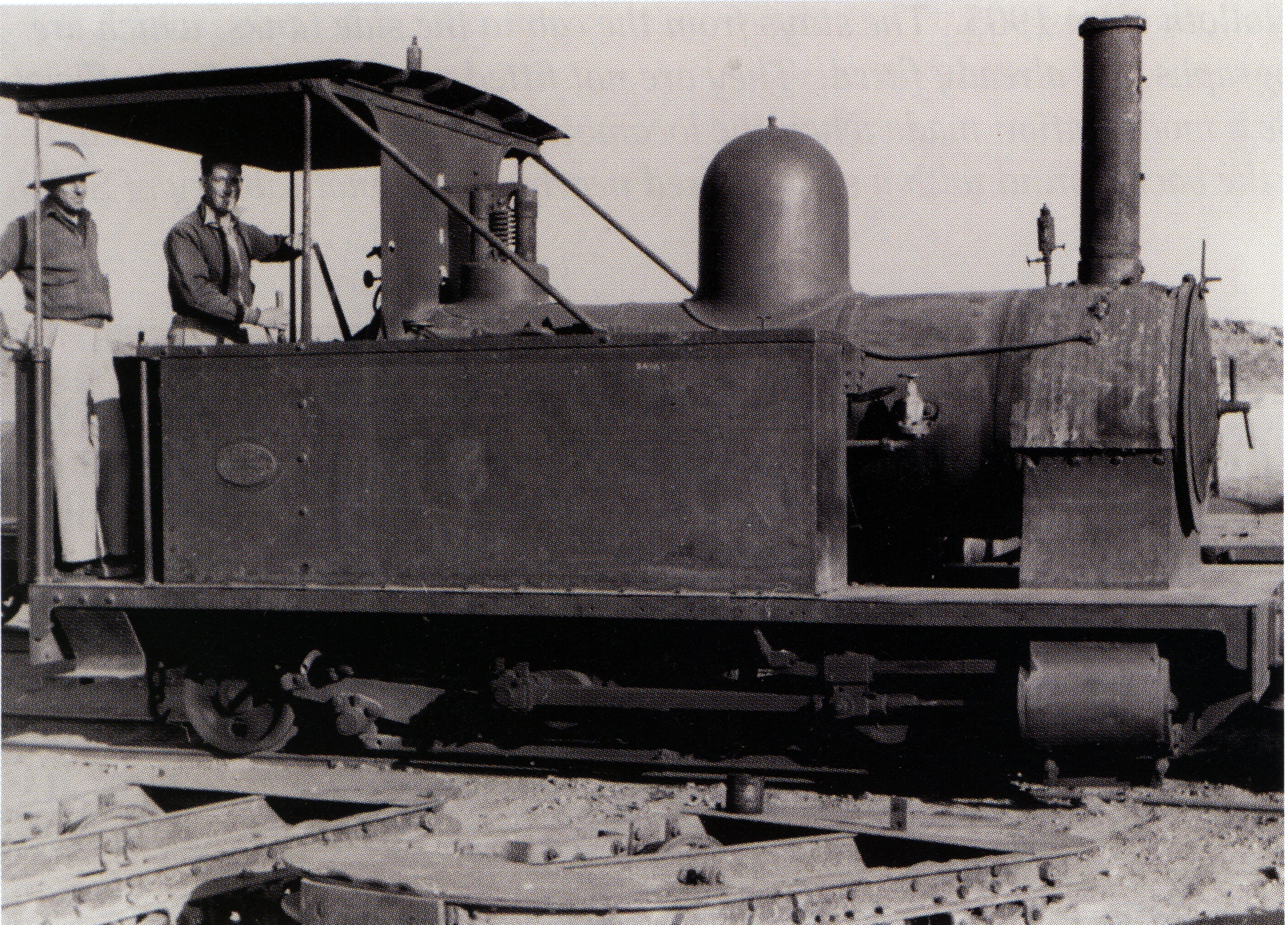
Britannia with its number "13" barely visible on the side tank, c. 1938
