= Namaqualand 0-4-2IST Caledonia =

Type of locomotive

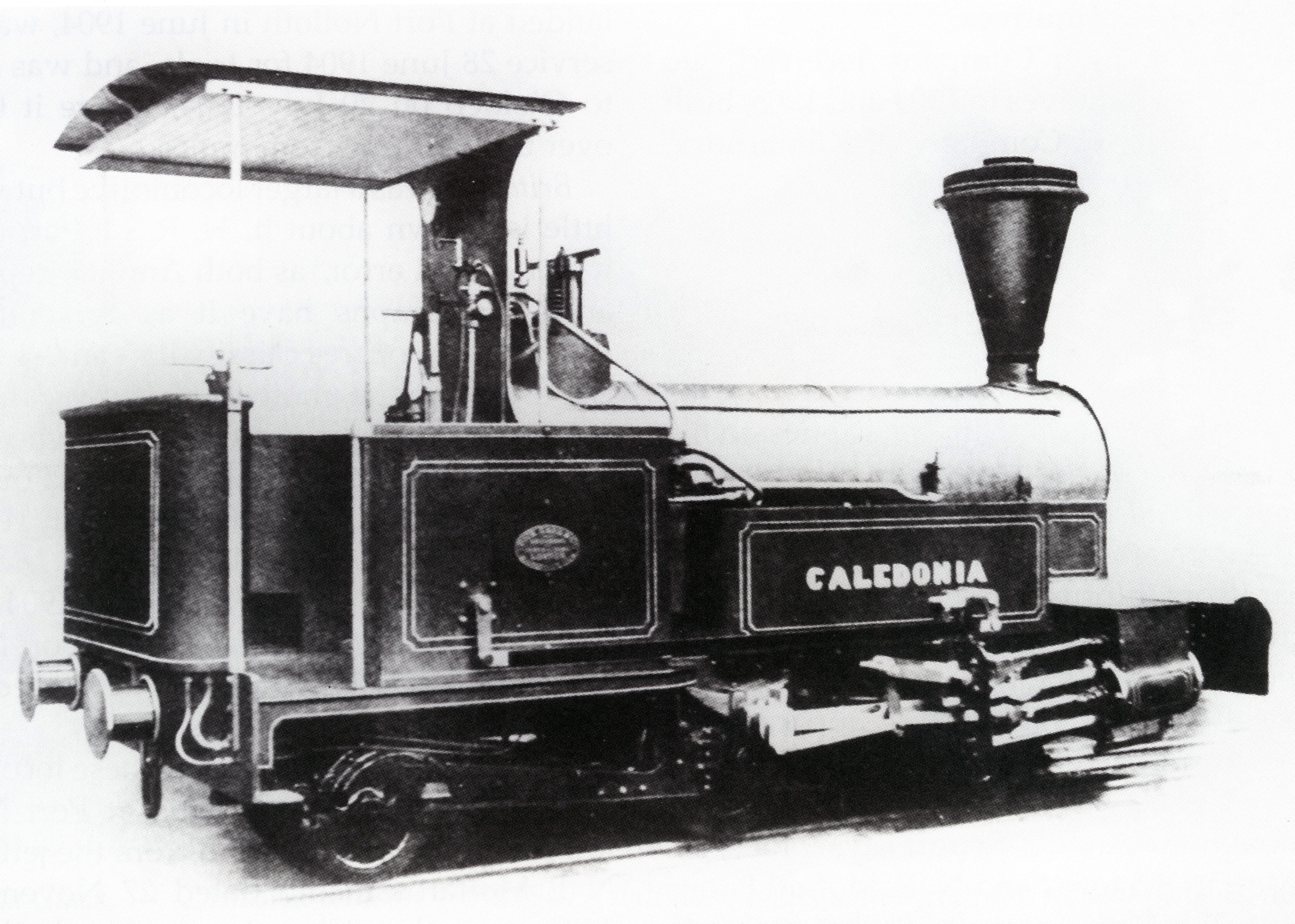
- Cape Copper Company 0-4-2IST Caledonia, c. 1904
Type and origin
- Power type: Steam
- Designer: Dick, Kerr & Company
- Builder: Dick, Kerr & Company
- Build date: 1904
Specifications
- Configuration
  - Whyte: 0-4-2IST
  - UIC: B1n2t
- Driver: 2nd coupled axle
- Gauge: 2 ft 6 in (762 mm) Namaqualand
- Loco weight: 9 LT 10 cwt (9,652 kg)
- Fuel type: Oil
- Firebox
  - Type: Round-top
- Boiler
  - Type: Domeless
- Safety valve: Ramsbottom
- Cylinders: Two
- Cylinder size: 7 in (178 mm) bore 12 in (305 mm) stroke
- Valve gear: Morton
- Couplers: Buffers-and-chain
Career
- Operators: Cape Copper Company; South African Copper Company; O'okiep Copper Company
- Number in class: 1
- Numbers: 11
- Official name: Caledonia
- Delivered: June 1904
- First run: 1904

The Cape Copper Company 0-4-2IST Caledonia of 1904 was a South African steam locomotive from the pre-Union era in the Cape of Good Hope.

In 1904, a single 0-4-2IST locomotive was placed in service by the Cape Copper Company as a shunting engine at O'okiep in Namaqualand in the Cape of Good Hope.

== Namaqualand Railway ==
The Namaqualand Railway was constructed between 1869 and 1876 by the Cape Copper Mining Company, restructured as the Cape Copper Company in 1888. The line from Port Nolloth on the West Coast to the copper mines around O'okiep was initially exclusively mule-powered, but in 1871 the first steam locomotives named John King and Miner were acquired by the mining company. They were followed between 1886 and 1888 by three [[Namaqualand 0-4-0WT Condenser|0-4-0WT condensing locomotives]] and between 1890 and 1901 by seven 0-6-2 Clara Class and Scotia Class Mountain type tender locomotives.

== The Caledonia ==
In 1904, a single 0-4-2IST locomotive named Caledonia was acquired from Dick, Kerr & Company of Kilmarnock in Scotland. On a saddle-tank locomotive the water tank is mounted astride the locomotive's boiler, while on the much less common inverted saddle-tank locomotive, the boiler is nested in the water tank. The locomotive was an oil-burner and used outside mounted Morton's valve gear. Apart from being named, it was also numbered 11 on the Cape Copper Company locomotive roster.

The locomotive was landed at Port Nolloth in June 1904. On 28 June it entered service on trial running and on 20 July 1904 it was allocated to O'okiep, where it relieved the mules from shunting work. At times it appears to have been returned to Port Nolloth to work there, probably as the workload at the port demanded.

== Illustration ==
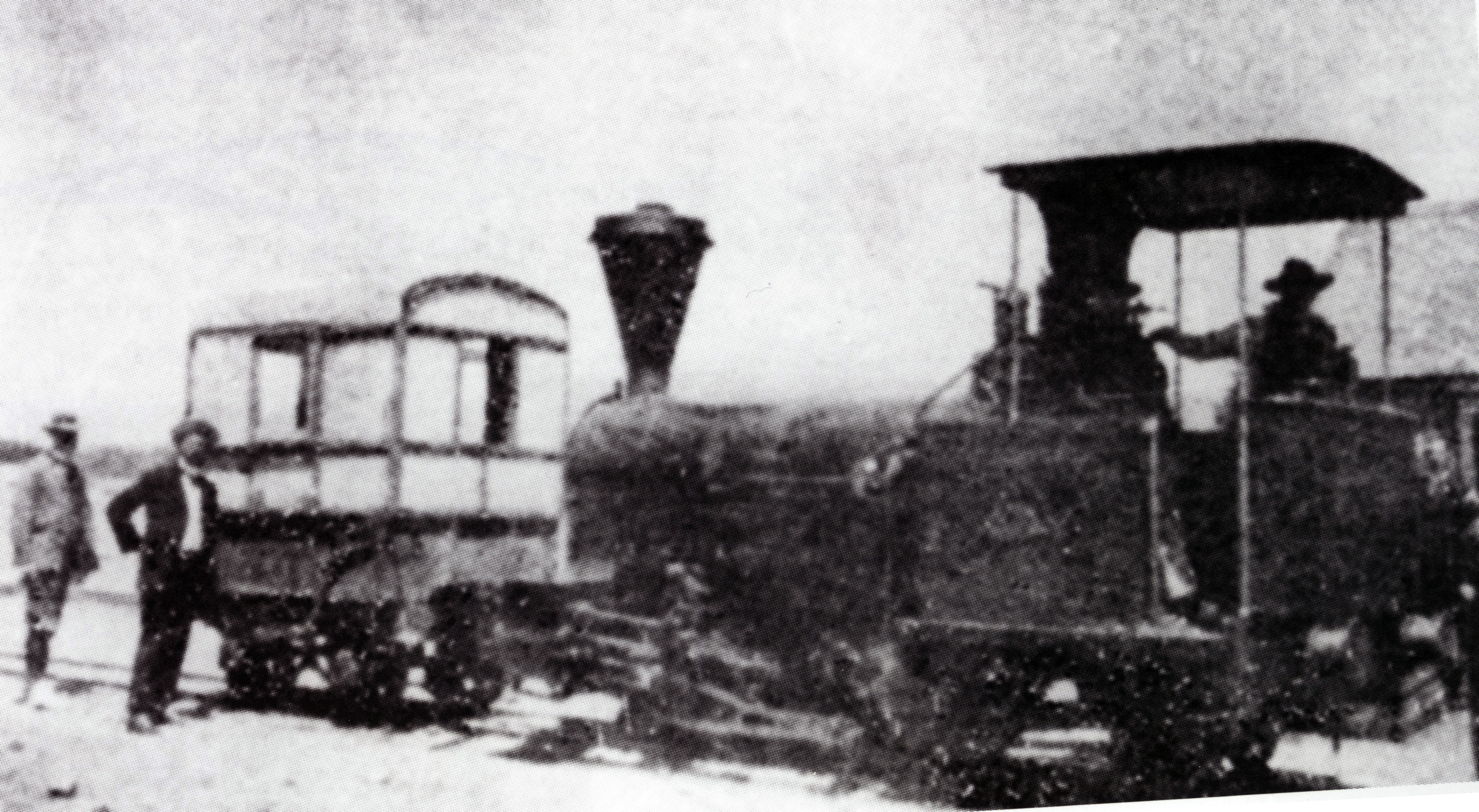
Caledonia shunting at Port Nolloth, c. 1905
