= Namaqualand Railway =

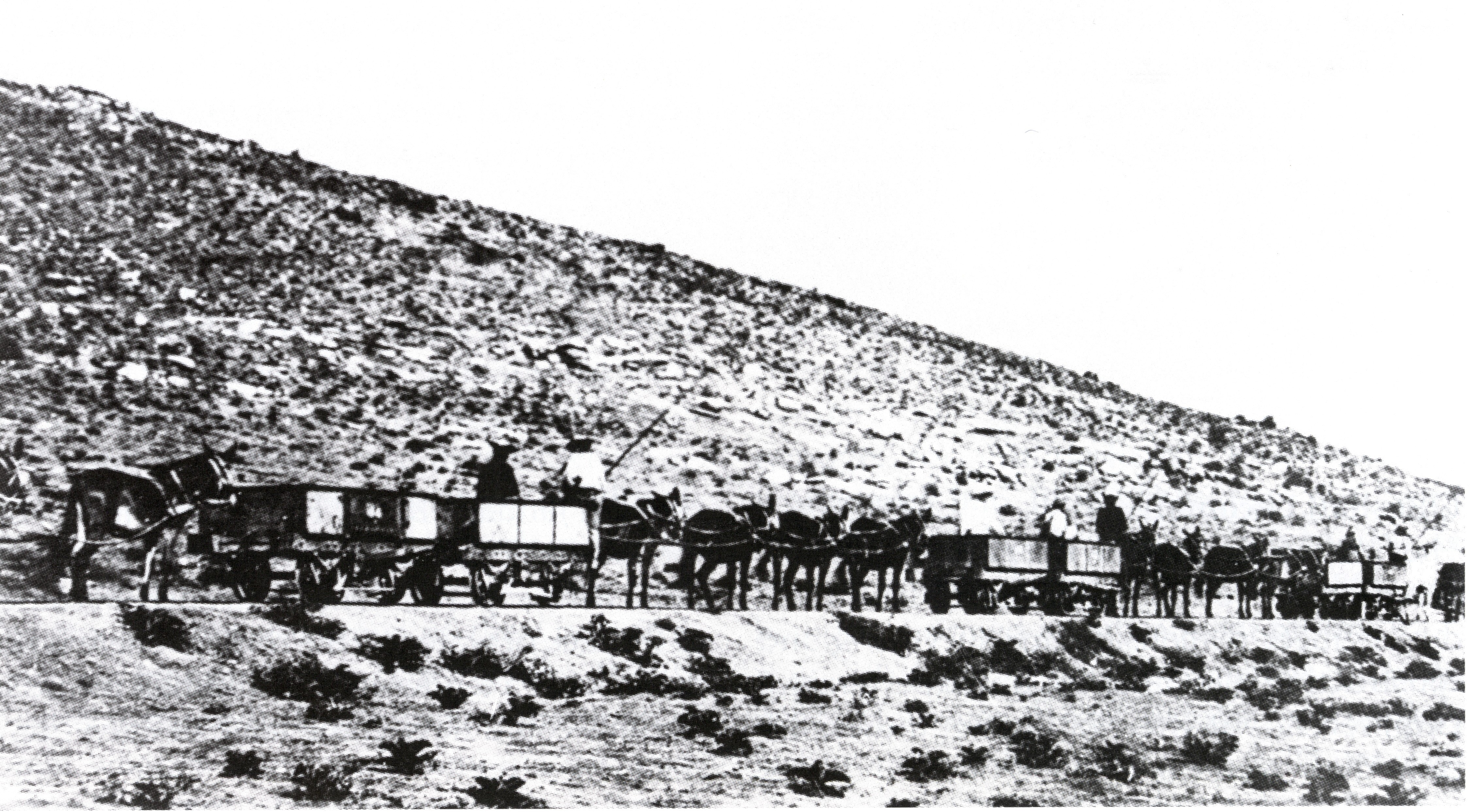
Namaqualand Railway mule train, c. 1876

The Namaqualand Railway was a 2 ft 6 in (762 mm) narrow gauge railway operating between Port Nolloth and O'okiep in the Namaqualand region of the former Cape Colony in South Africa. It was originally a mule-drawn railway built to provide an outlet for the copper mines of the region. Constructed between 1869 and 1876, the railway was 93 1/2 miles (150 kilometres) long, with an additional 8 miles purely associated with the copper mine workings. Although owned by the Cape Copper Company, the railway always operated as a public railway.

The railway pre-dated the construction of 3 ft 6 in (1,067 mm) railways in South Africa. Because of the success of the Namaqualand line, 2 ft 6 in (762 mm) gauge was strongly promoted by civil engineer R. Thomas Hall, Superintendent of the narrow gauge Redruth and Chacewater Railway in Cornwall who was involved in the construction of the Namaqualand Railway, as the primary gauge for railway construction in South Africa. The final decision was a compromise between the two recommended gauges and the 3 ft 6 in (1,067 mm) came into existence in Africa.

After copper mining ceased in 1928 the railway was temporarily closed until 1937 when mining activities resumed.

The Namaqualand Railway finally closed in 1944.

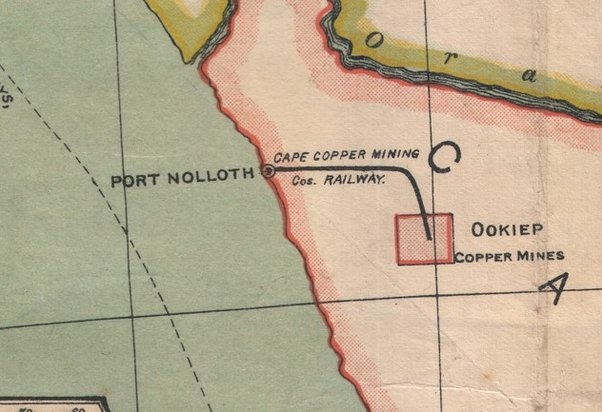
Railway Map from the early part of the line's existence, c. 1876

== Locomotives ==
- Namaqualand 0-4-0WT Condenser
- Namaqualand 0-4-2IST Caledonia
- Namaqualand 0-4-2ST Pioneer
- Namaqualand 0-4-2T Britannia
- Namaqualand 0-6-0T 1871
- Namaqualand 0-6-2 Clara Class
- Namaqualand 0-6-2 Scotia Class
