= Namaqualand 0-6-2 Scotia Class =

Class of 6 South African 0-6-2 locomotives

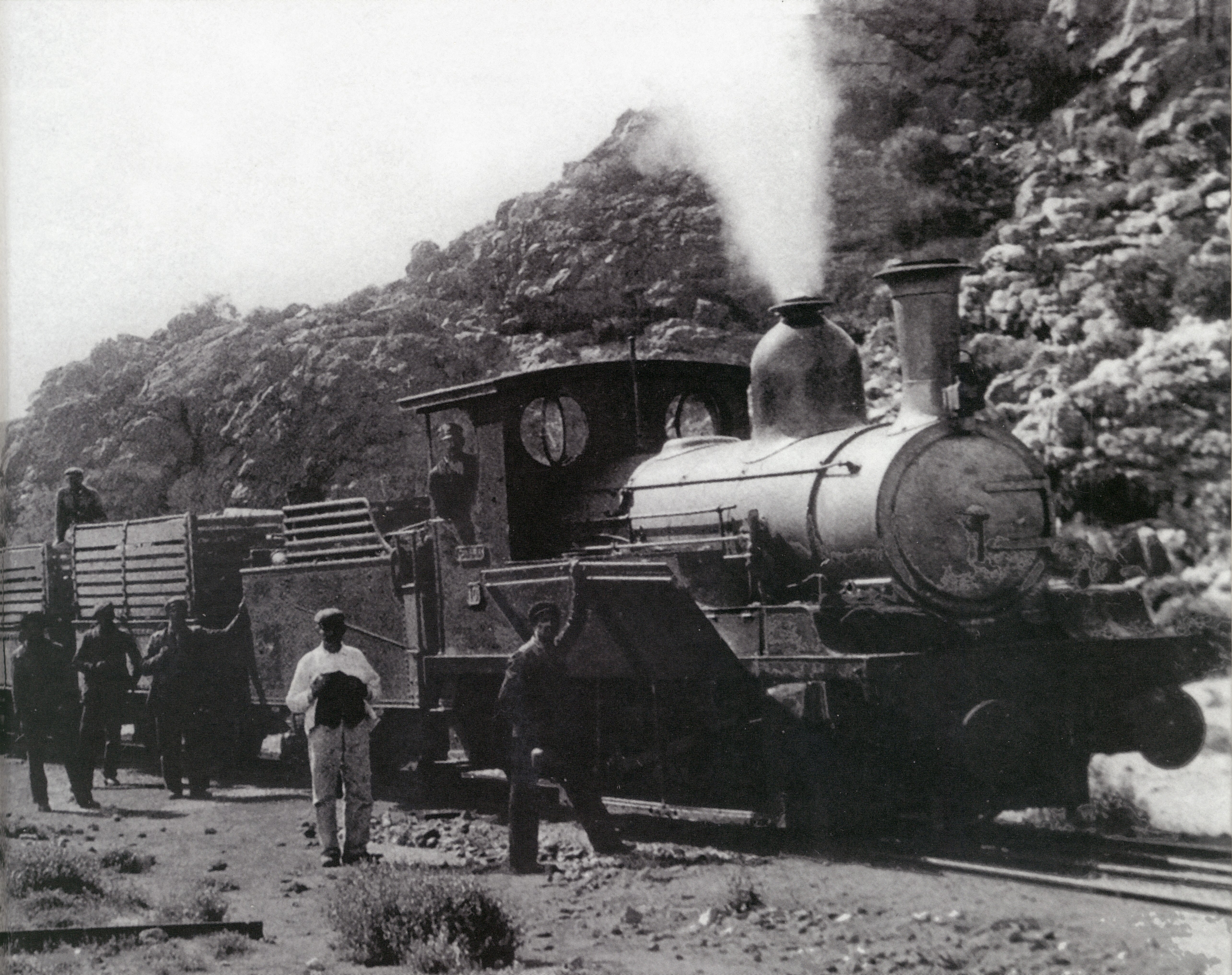
- Cape Copper Company 0-6-2 Scotia Class no. 10 Cambria at Ratelpoort, c. 1910
Type and origin
- ♠ - Locomotives no. 8, 9, 10 & 12 ♥ - Locomotives no. 14 & 15
- Power type: Steam
- Designer: Kitson and Company
- Builder: Kitson and Company
- Serial number: 3976, 4089, 4090, 4291, 4331, 4332
- Build date: 1900-1905
Specifications
- Configuration
  - Whyte: 0-6-2 (Branchliner)
  - UIC: C1'n2
- Driver: 3rd coupled axle
- Gauge: 2 ft 6 in (762 mm) Namaqualand
- Coupled dia.: 36 in (914 mm)
- Wheelbase: 11 ft 3 in (3,429 mm)
  - Coupled: 6 ft 3 in (1,905 mm)
- Loco weight: 25 LT 10 cwt (25,910 kg)
- Tender weight: 11 LT (11,180 kg)
- Total weight: 36 LT 10 cwt (37,090 kg)
- Tender type: 2-axle
- Fuel type: Coal
- Fuel capacity: 2 LT (2.0 t) as built 3 LT (3.0 t) modified
- Water cap.: 1,000 imp gal (4,550 L)
- Firebox
  - Type: Round-top ♠ 5 ft 9 in (1,753 mm) long 3 ft 9 5/16 in (1,151 mm) wide ♥ 5 ft 9 1/8 in (1,756 mm) long 3 ft 9 1/8 in (1,146 mm) wide
  - Grate area: 15 sq ft (1.4 m^{2})
- Boiler
  - Diameter: ♠♥ 3 ft 8 in (1,118 mm)
  - Tube plates: ♠ 8 ft 7 1/2 in (2,629 mm) ♥ 8 ft 7 7/16 in (2,627 mm)
  - Small tubes: 1 3/4 in (44 mm)
- Boiler pressure: 150 psi (1,034 kPa)
- Heating surface
  - Firebox: ♠ 73.5 sq ft (6.83 m^{2}) ♥ 72.5 sq ft (6.74 m^{2})
  - Tubes: See table for number & surface
  - Total surface: See table
- Cylinders: Two
- Cylinder size: 14 in (356 mm) bore 21 in (533 mm) stroke
- Valve gear: J. Hawthorn-Kitson
- Couplers: Buffers-and-chain
Performance figures
- Tractive effort: 12,860 lbf (57.2 kN) @ 75%
Career
- Operators: Cape Copper Company; South African Copper Company; O'okiep Copper Company
- Numbers: 8-10, 12, 14-15
- Official name: Scotia, Hibernia, Cambria, Canada, Australia & India
- Delivered: 1900-1905
- First run: 1900

The Cape Copper Company 0-6-2 Scotia Class of 1900 was a South African steam locomotive from the pre-Union era in the Cape of Good Hope.

Between 1900 and 1905, six more Mountain type tender locomotives with a 0-6-2 wheel arrangement were placed in service by the Cape Copper Company on its two-foot six inch gauge Namaqualand Railway between Port Nolloth and O'okiep in the Cape of Good Hope. Later described as the Scotia Class, they were similar to the earlier Clara Class locomotives, but with shorter boilers, longer fireboxes and larger firegrates.

== Namaqualand Railway ==
The Namaqualand Railway was constructed between 1869 and 1876 by the Cape Copper Mining Company, restructured as the Cape Copper Company in 1888. The railway from Port Nolloth on the West Coast to the copper mines around O'okiep was initially exclusively mule-powered, but in 1871 two 0-6-0T locomotives named John King and Miner were acquired by the mining company on an experimental basis. They were followed between 1886 and 1888 by three 0-4-0WT condensing locomotives, and from 1890 by four 0-6-2 Clara Class Mountain type tender locomotives.

== The Mountain locomotives ==
Between 1900 and 1905, six more 0-6-2 tender locomotives of the Mountain type were delivered to the Cape Copper Company from Kitson and Company. Since the first three locomotives of the Clara Class suffered major problems with their fireboxes and tubes as a result of the poor quality of water in the region and tough working conditions, a fourth locomotive, no. 7 named Albion, had been delivered in 1898 with a shorter boiler to make room for a longer firebox in an effort to overcome these issues. These six new locomotives were a further development in the same direction, also with larger fireboxes, but with slightly longer boilers than no. 7 Albion, which resulted in boiler-and-firebox assemblies which were about a foot longer than those of the earlier locomotives.

== Characteristics ==
These six locomotives were very similar in appearance to the earlier Clara Class, but could be visually identified by their steam domes which were located further forward, closer to their chimneys, as well as by the different shape of the cutaway at the rear of their frames above their trailing axles. They were named Scotia, Hibernia, Cambria, Canada, Australia and India respectively and were also numbered, in the range from 8 to 10, 12, 14 and 15. They were later described as the Scotia Class.

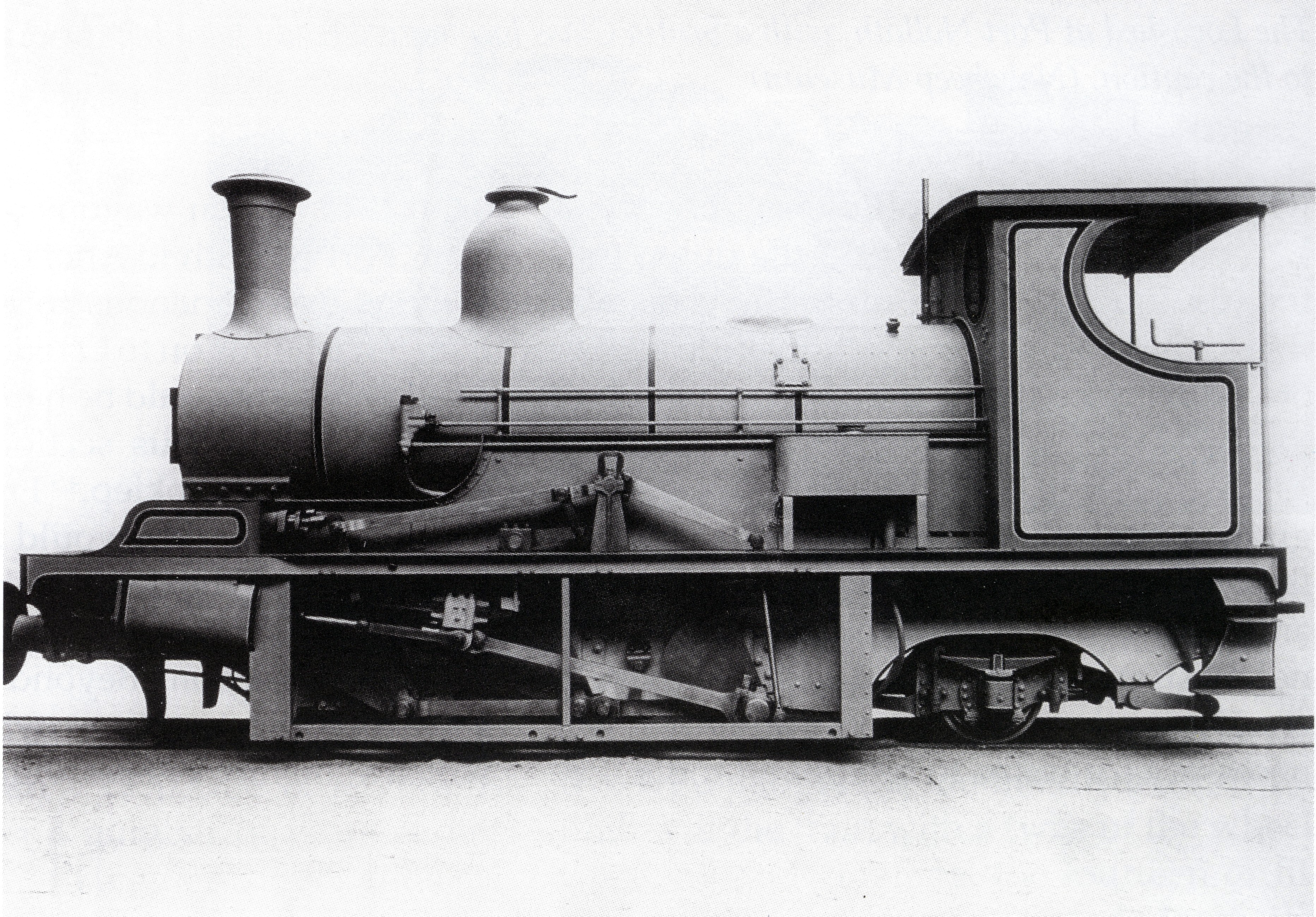
Scotia Class, either no. 9 Hibernia or no. 10 Cambria, sans tender, c. 1901

Like their predecessors, the condensing and Clara Class locomotives, they were equipped with sheet-metal casing above and below their running boards. This was to protect the motion and bearings, as well as working parts of the J. Hawthorn-Kitson valve gear which protruded above the running boards, from wind-blown sand. The bottom encasement was hinged to allow easy access to the motion. The picture alongside shows a Scotia Class locomotive without this casing.

Like the earlier locomotives, the Scotia Class was also delivered with copper boilers and fireboxes. Around April 1903, no. 8 Scotia was fitted with an experimental steel boiler and around 1907-1908 two more steel boilers with copper fireboxes were acquired as spare boilers for the Scotia Class.

== Service ==
A fall in copper prices at the end of the First World War resulted in the closure of the Cape Copper Company mines and in June 1922 the company was put into the hands of receivers and managers. In 1926, the South African assets of the company were optioned to the American Metal Company who, together with the Newmont Mining Corporation, formed the South African Copper Company in 1928 to hold the option, which was taken up in 1931. When the economic situation improved, the option holders and other interested parties formed the O'okiep Copper Company, which took over the assets and liabilities of the South African Copper Company and resumed mining in May 1937.

Little mining had been done during the depression years but, as a common carrier, the Namaqualand Railway was not closed and a skeleton service of two trains per week continued to operate. During the approximately nineteen years while the mines were closed, the railway was apparently run more or less by one man, Jack Meadows, the station master at O'okiep. He would also travel on the twice-weekly trains to Port Nolloth, acting as conductor and bookkeeper. At Port Nolloth, he would carry out the duties of port captain and supervise offloading and loading before returning to O'okiep the following day. As a result, the line was kept in good repair during the lean years.

The Cape Copper Company steam locomotives also passed into the hands of the O'okiep Copper Company. Whether all were still serviceable is doubtful, but seventeen engines were still shown as in stock in the Railway Year Books, until the 1938/1939 edition. The 1939/1940 edition, however, listed only three steam locomotives, the identity of which is not known.

== Specifications ==
The numbers, names, works numbers, years built, date of arrival, date in service, number of boiler tubes, heating surface of the boiler tubes and firebox and the total heating surface of the Scotia Class are listed in the table.

Cape Copper Company 0-6-2 Scotia Class
No.	Name	Works no.	Year built	Date arrived	Date in service	Boiler tubes	Heating surface, tubes	Heating surface, firebox	Heating surface, total
8	Scotia	3976	1900	Jan 1901	Jan 1901	132	544 1/5 sq ft (50.558 m^{2})	73 1/2 sq ft (6.828 m^{2})	617 7/10 sq ft (57.386 m^{2})
9	Hibernia	4089	1901	Nov 1901	Nov 1901	136	559 3/10 sq ft (51.961 m^{2})	73 1/2 sq ft (6.828 m^{2})	632 4/5 sq ft (58.789 m^{2})
10	Cambria	4090	1901	Nov 1901	Nov 1901	136	559 3/10 sq ft (51.961 m^{2})	73 1/2 sq ft (6.828 m^{2})	632 4/5 sq ft (58.789 m^{2})
12	Canada	4291	1904	Dec 1904	Dec 1904	137	563 1/2 sq ft (52.351 m^{2})	73 1/2 sq ft (6.828 m^{2})	637 sq ft (59.179 m^{2})
14	Australia	4331	1905	Sep 1905	Oct 1905	137	566 1/10 sq ft (52.592 m^{2})	72 1/2 sq ft (6.735 m^{2})	638 3/5 sq ft (59.328 m^{2})
15	India	4332	1905	Sep 1905	Oct 1905	137	566 1/10 sq ft (52.592 m^{2})	72 1/2 sq ft (6.735 m^{2})	638 3/5 sq ft (59.328 m^{2})

== Illustration ==
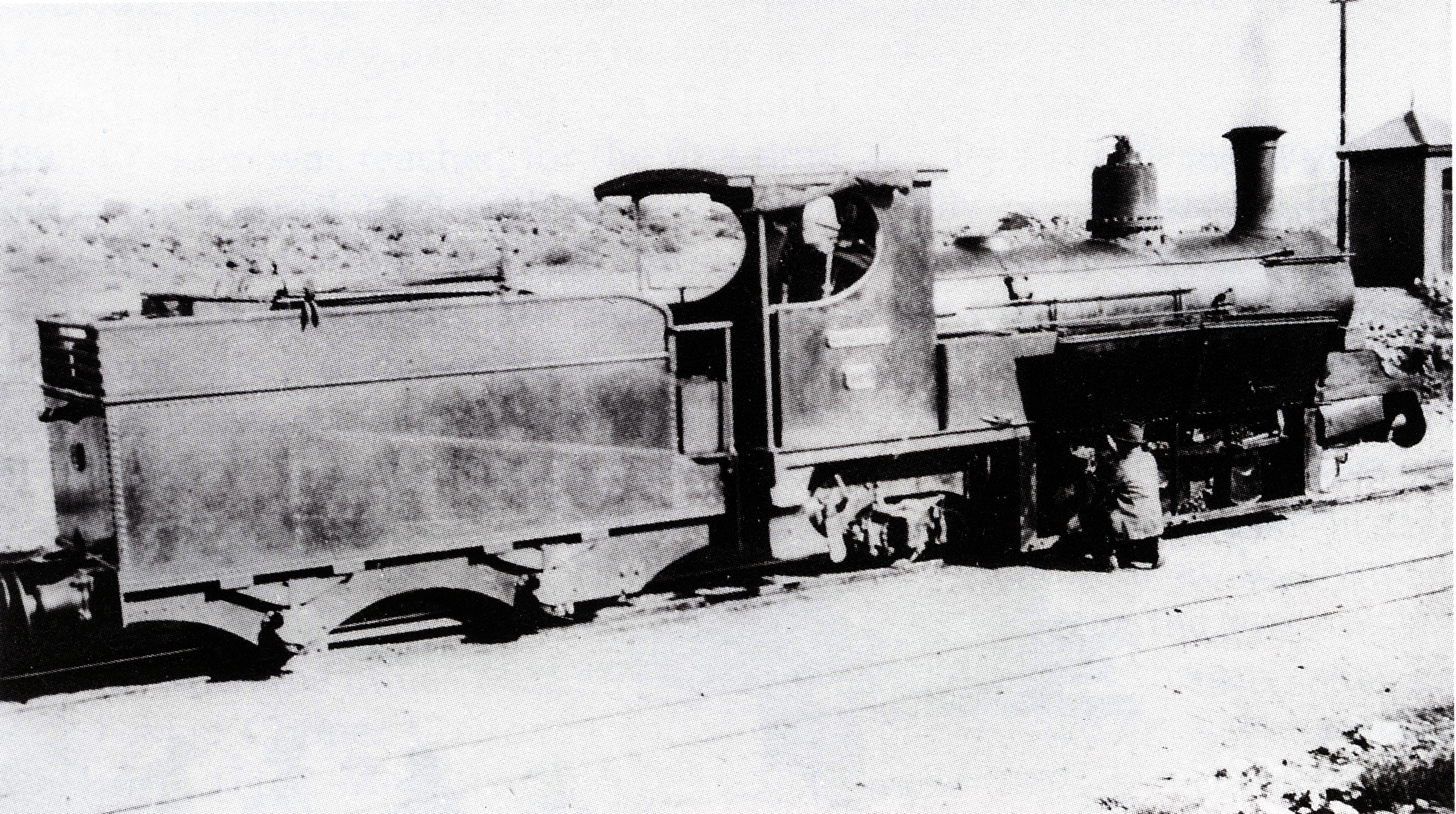
Scotia Class locomotive being oiled by its driver at Vrieskloof

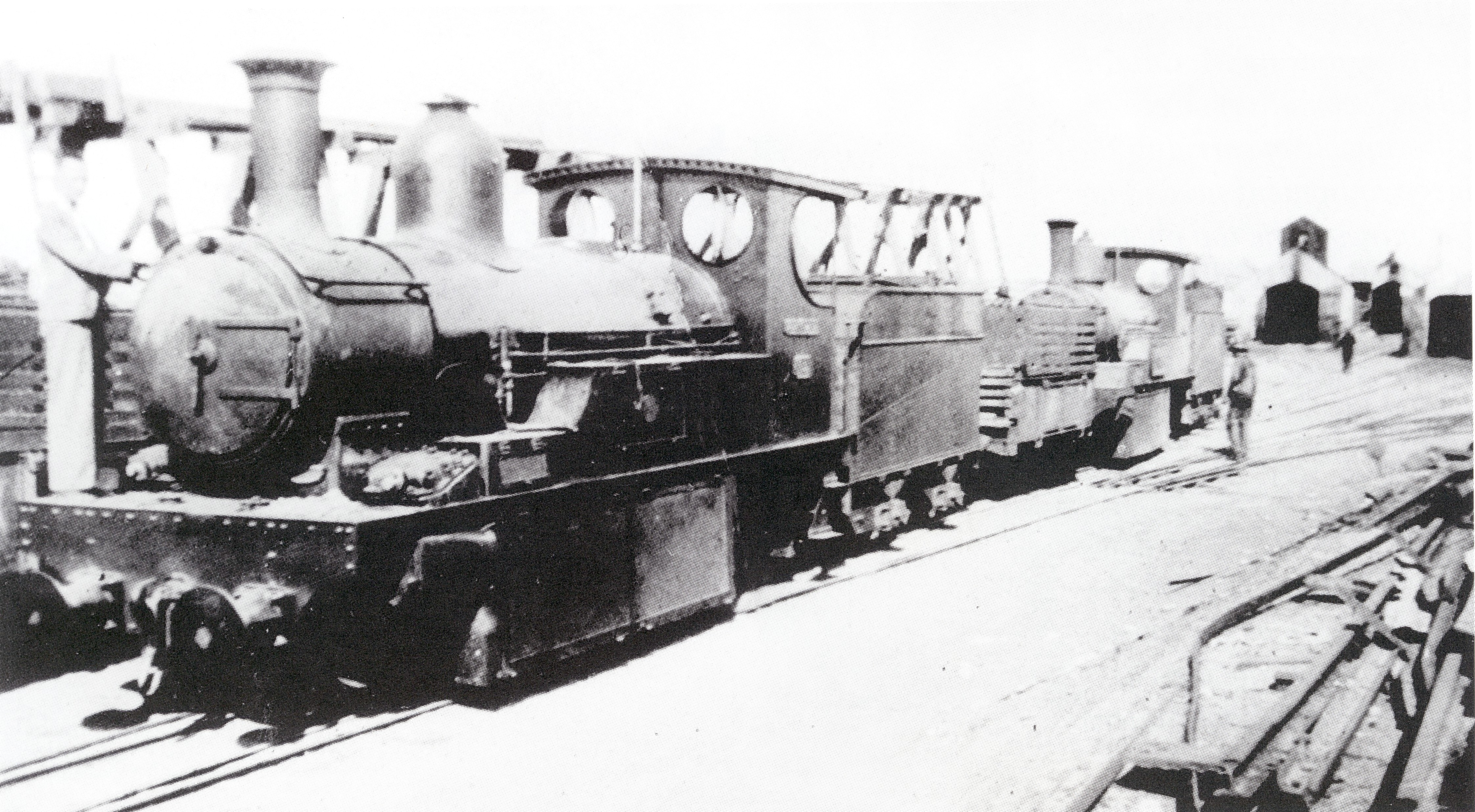
Scotia Class locomotives at Port Nolloth locomotive sheds

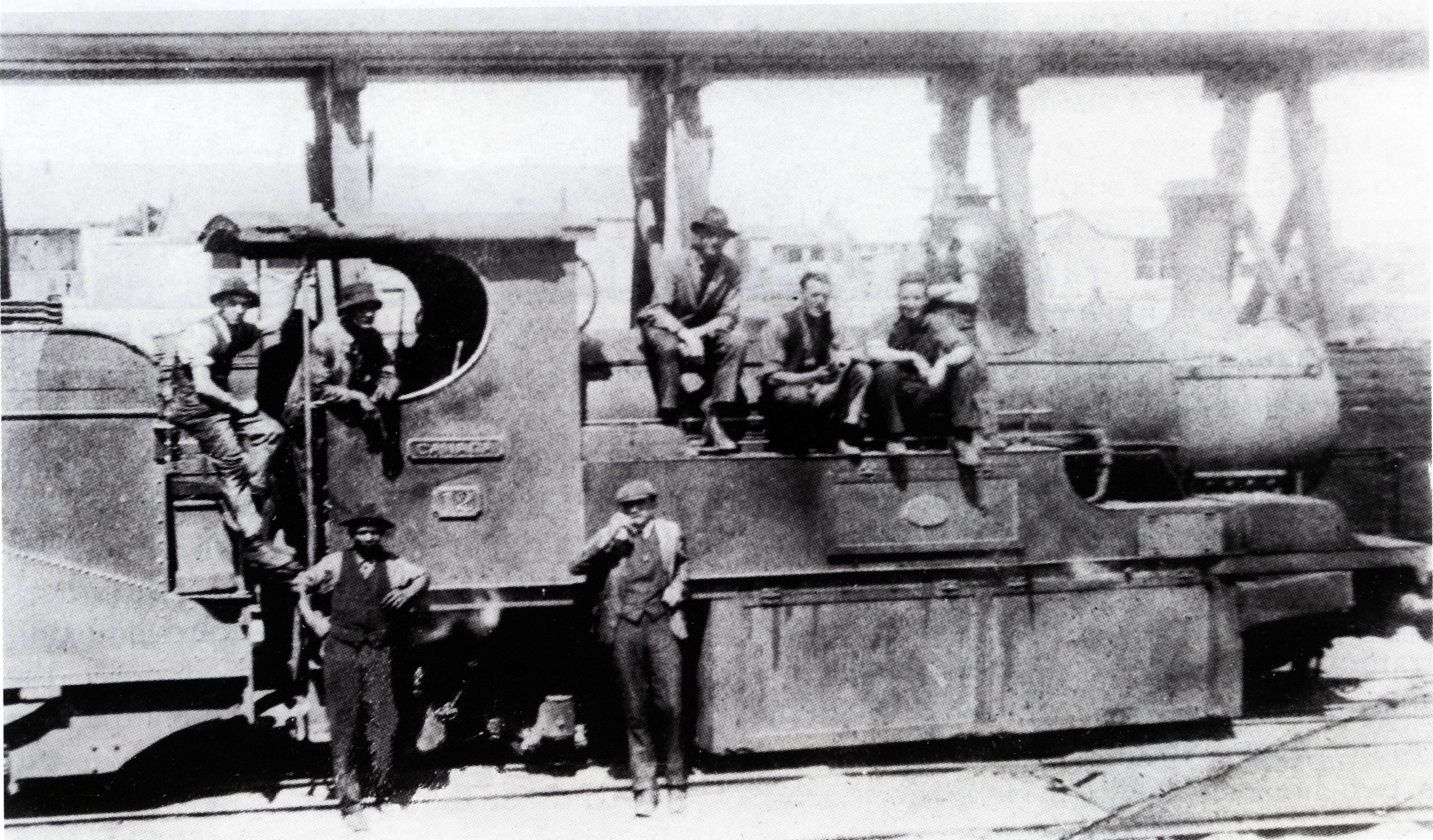
Scotia Class no. 12 Canada at Port Nolloth locomotive sheds
