= Namaqualand 0-6-2 Clara Class =

South African steam locomotive

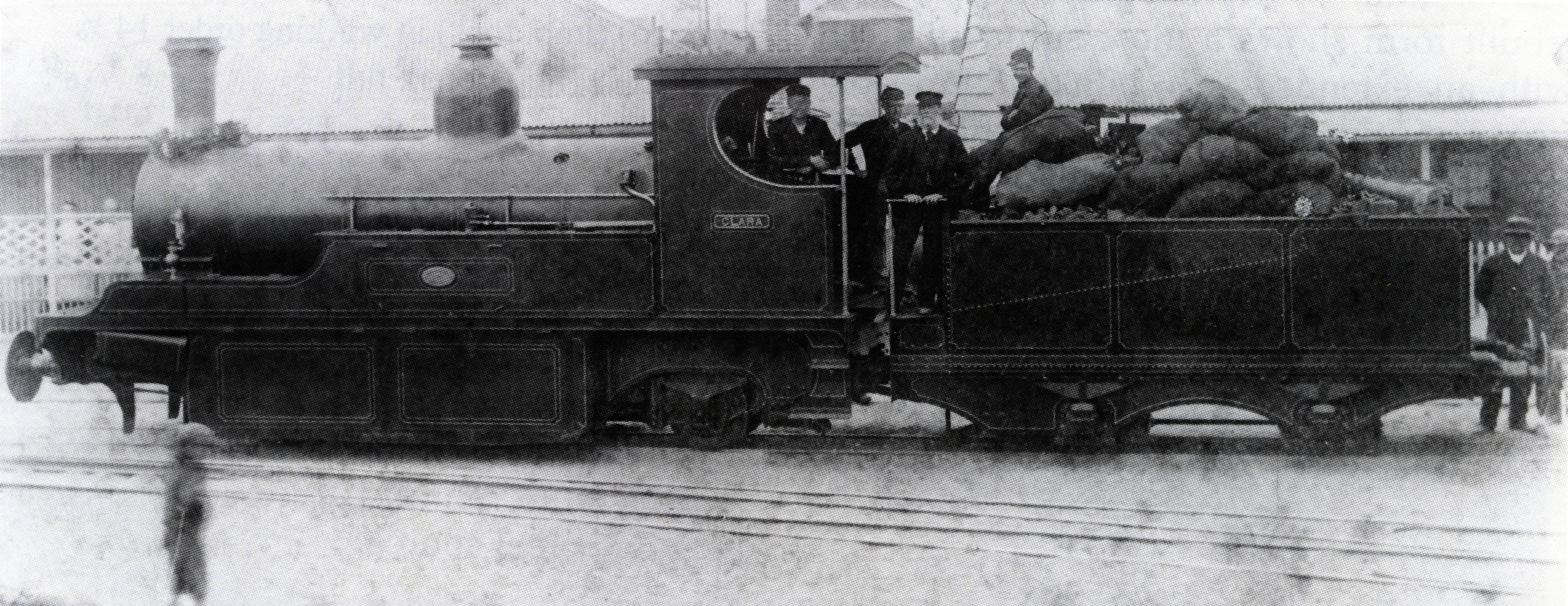
- Cape Copper Company no. 4 Clara, c. 1890
Type and origin
- ♠ - Clara, Marie & James Kitson ♥ - Albion
- Power type: Steam
- Designer: Kitson and Company
- Builder: Kitson and Company
- Serial number: ♠ T246, T258, T261 ♥ T287
- Build date: 1890-1898
Specifications
- Configuration
  - Whyte: 0-6-2 (Branchliner)
  - UIC: C1'n2
- Driver: 2nd coupled axle
- Gauge: 2 ft 6 in (762 mm) Namaqualand
- Coupled dia.: 36 in (914 mm)
- Wheelbase
  - Engine: 11 ft 3 in (3,429 mm)
  - Coupled: 6 ft 3 in (1,905 mm)
- Loco weight: 22 LT 12 cwt (22,960 kg)
- Tender weight: 11 LT (11,180 kg)
- Total weight: 33 LT 12 cwt (34,140 kg)
- Tender type: 2-axle
- Fuel type: Coal
- Fuel capacity: 2 LT (2.0 t) as built 3 LT (3.0 t) modified
- Water cap.: 1,000 imp gal (4,550 L)
- Firebox
  - Type: Round-top
  - Grate area: ♠ 11.5 sq ft (1.07 m^{2}) ♥ 13.6 sq ft (1.26 m^{2})
- Boiler
  - Diameter: ♠♥ 3 ft 8 in (1,118 mm)
  - Tube plates: ♠ 9 ft 1 1/4 in (2,775 mm) ♥8 ft 3 1/2 in (2,527 mm)
  - Small tubes: ♠ 136: 1 3/4 in (44 mm) ♥ 132: 1 3/4 in (44 mm)
- Boiler pressure: 150 psi (1,034 kPa)
- Heating surface
  - Firebox: ♠ 4 ft 2 in (1,270 mm) long 3 ft 9 5/16 in (1,151 mm) wide 58 sq ft (5.4 m^{2}) ♥ 4 ft 11 in (1,499 mm) long 3 ft 9 5/16 in (1,151 mm) wide 61.6 sq ft (5.72 m^{2})
  - Tubes: ♠ 559 sq ft (51.9 m^{2}) ♥ 521.4 sq ft (48.44 m^{2})
  - Total surface: ♠ 617 sq ft (57.3 m^{2}) ♥ 583 sq ft (54.2 m^{2})
- Cylinders: Two
- Cylinder size: 14 in (356 mm) bore 21 in (533 mm) stroke
- Valve gear: J. Hawthorn-Kitson
- Couplers: Buffers-and-chain
Performance figures
- Tractive effort: 12,860 lbf (57.2 kN) @ 75%
Career
- Operators: Cape Copper Company; South African Copper Company; O'okiep Copper Company
- Number in class: 4
- Numbers: 4-7
- Official name: Clara, Marie, James Kitson, Albion
- Delivered: 1890-1898
- First run: 1890

The Namaqualand 0-6-2 Clara Class of 1890 was a South African steam locomotive from the pre-Union era in the Cape of Good Hope.

Between 1890 and 1898, four tender locomotives with a 0-6-2 wheel arrangement were placed in service by the Cape Copper Company on its two-foot six-inch gauge Namaqualand Railway between Port Nolloth and O'okiep in the Cape of Good Hope. Acquired to meet the traffic needs of the upper mountainous section of the railway, they became known as the Mountain type. The first three of these locomotives were later described as the Clara Class, while the fourth was included in this Class by some and included in the subsequent Scotia Class by others.

== Namaqualand Railway ==
The Namaqualand Railway was constructed between 1869 and 1876 by the Cape Copper Mining Company, restructured as the Cape Copper Company in 1888. The 93 1/2-mile-long (150-kilometre) railway from Port Nolloth on the West Coast to the copper mines around O'okiep was initially exclusively mule-powered, but in 1871 two 0-6-0T locomotives named John King and Miner were acquired by the mining company on an experimental basis. They were followed between 1886 and 1888 by three 0-4-0WT condensing locomotives.

== The Mountain locomotives ==
In the early years when most of the traffic on the railway was still mule-powered, the high-grade copper ore with an average copper content of 20% was hand-sorted to make its transport to the coast as economical as possible. By 1867, the first smelter was opened at the mines to further reduce the tonnage which needed to be carried to the coast, and coke for the smelter began to be carried on the return journeys.

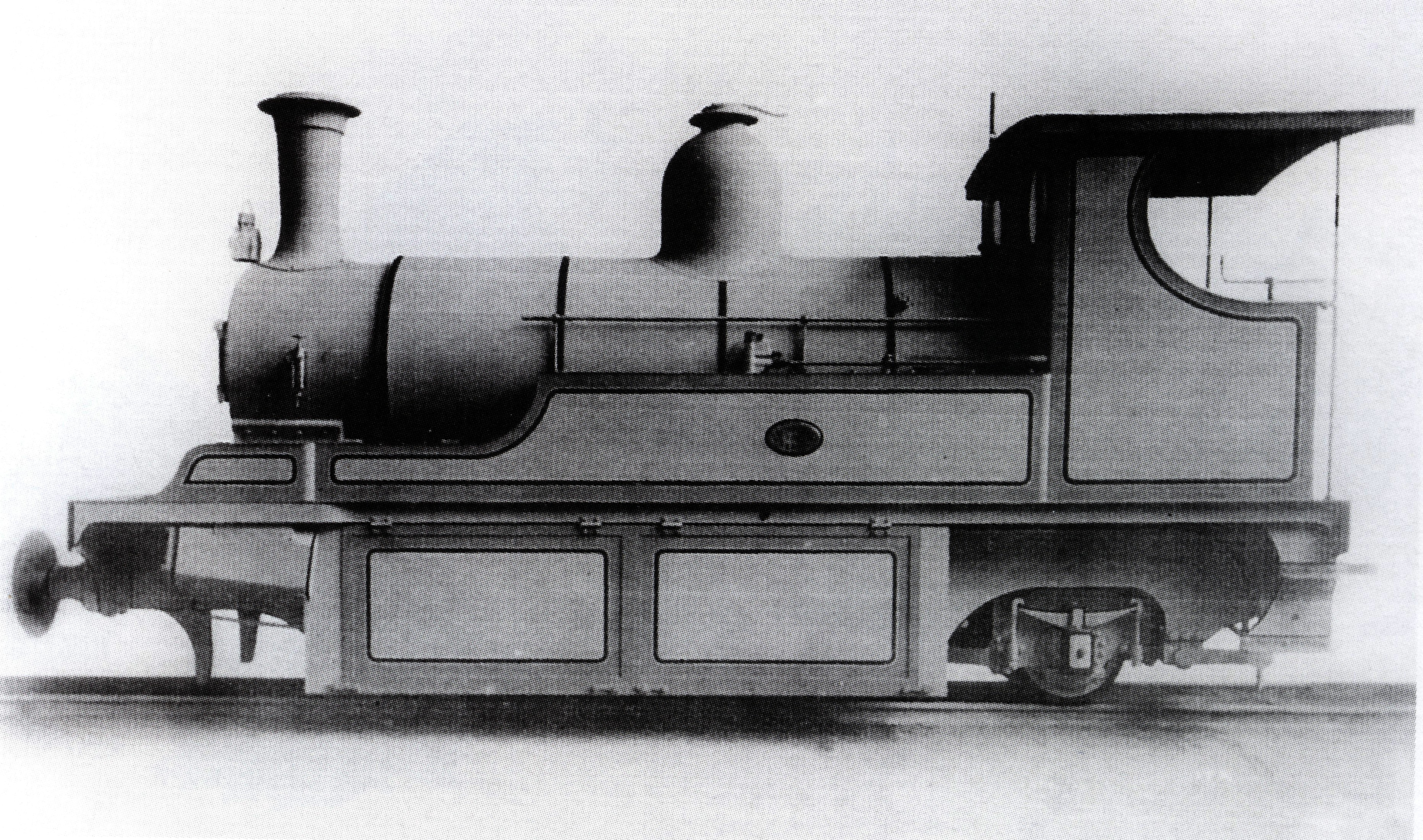
Clara Class no. 5 Marie without tender, c. 1891

As smelting capacity at the mines increased, tonnages of coke from the coast to the mine increased and the mules could no longer cope. To meet the needs of the upper mountainous section of the railway, Kitson and Company supplied a powerful 0-6-2 tender locomotive in 1890. Another engine entered service in 1892, and a third in 1893. These locomotives were numbered in the range from 4 to 6 and were named Clara, Marie and James Kitson respectively.

A fourth locomotive was delivered from Kitson in August 1898, numbered 7 and named Albion. It differed from the first three locomotives in some respects, mainly its shorter boiler, longer firebox and a larger firegrate area.

Like their predecessor condensing locomotives, these tender locomotives were equipped with sheet-metal casing above and below the running boards. This was to protect the motion and bearings as well as working parts of the J. Hawthorn-Kitson valve gear above the running boards from wind-blown sand. The bottom encasement was hinged to allow easy access to the motion. The engines all had copper boilers.

== Service ==
After undergoing trials on the lower section in September 1890, the engine Clara started work on the upper section on 2 October 1890 with a special train to the summit of the Klipfontein Mountain, where celebrations had been arranged and the engine Clara was christened. The main picture, showing the engine Clara with a garland around the chimney, was possibly taken on the occasion of this inaugural mountain run.

On 15 May 1893, with the upper section upgraded for locomotive operation and the first three Mountain locomotives in service, it was possible to introduce a through steam-hauled service from the coast to O'okiep. The older condensing locomotives were then relegated to lesser duties, mostly restricted to the lower section near the coast.

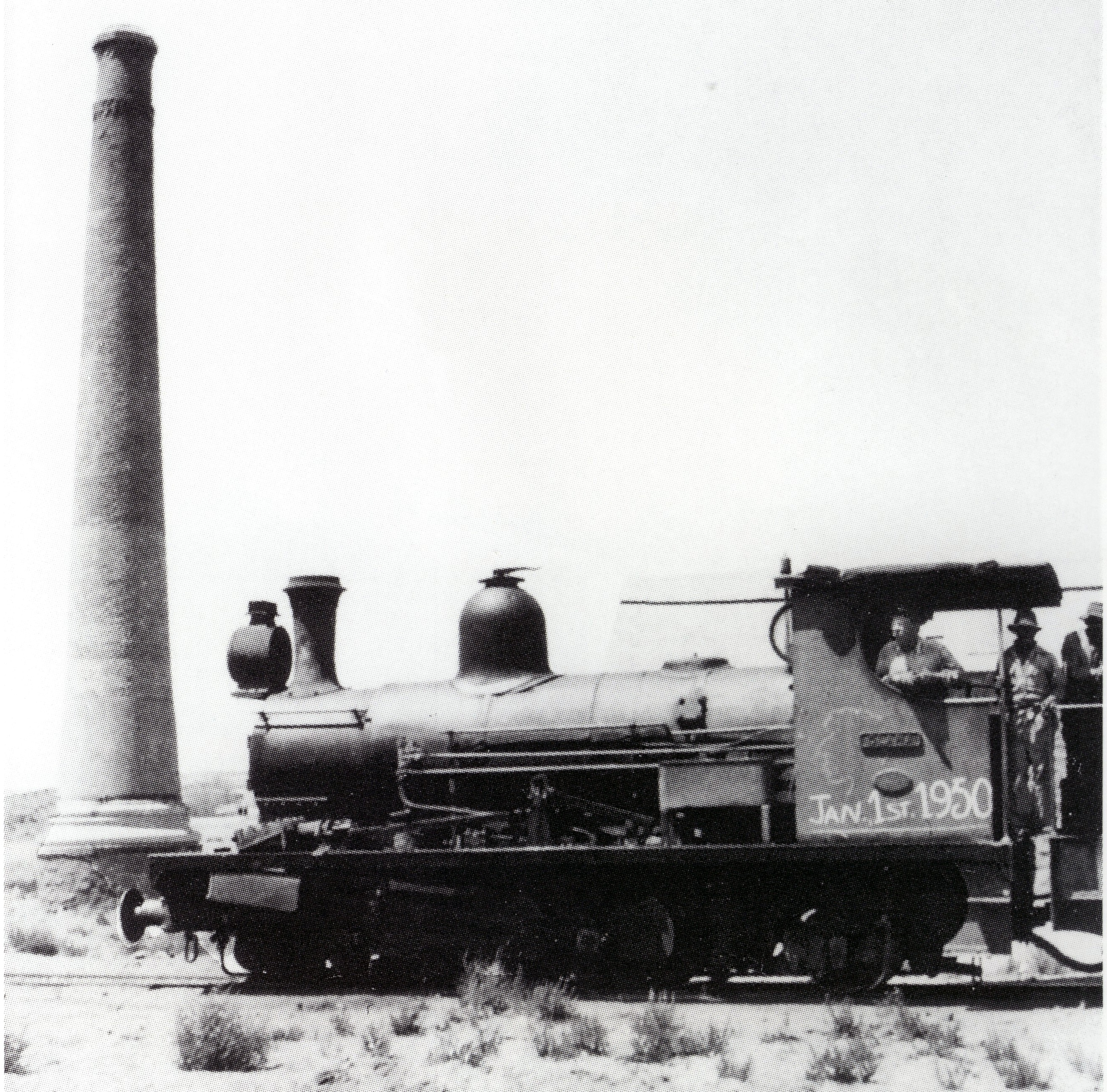
No. 4 Clara on the shunt at the O'okiep Stack on 1 January 1950

As a result of the poor quality of water in the region and tough working conditions, the first three locomotives, like their predecessors, suffered major problems with their fireboxes and tubes. In an effort to overcome these issues, the fourth locomotive, no. 7 Albion, was delivered in 1898 with a shorter boiler to make room for a longer firebox. In November 1900, a spare boiler, similar to the engine Albion's with an enlarged firebox, was purchased to speed up repairs. It was fitted to the engine Albion and, after that, it was possible to exchange reconditioned boilers between locomotives as needed.

After the Cape Copper Company ceased mining and passed into the hands of receivers in 1922, all four locomotives survived to see service with the South African Copper Company from 1928 and the O'okiep Copper Company from 1937. Two or three of them were withdrawn and scrapped by 1942. Engine no. 4 Clara survived and was still employed in shunting and local service on the section between Nababeep and O'okiep as late as 1950. It was withdrawn from service in March 1950 and was eventually plinthed at the entrance to the Nababeep mine workings in 1966. Later, when the Peter Philip Museum was established in the town in 1978, it was moved to the museum.

The numbers, names, works numbers, years built, dates of arrival and dates in service of the Clara Class are listed in the table.

Cape Copper Company 0-6-2 Clara Class
No.	Name	Works no.	Year built	Date arrived	Date in service
4	Clara	T246	1890	Jun 1890	Sep 1890
5	Marie	T258	1891	Nov 1891	Feb 1892
6	James Kitson	T261	1892	Dec 1892	Mar 1893
7	Albion	T287	1898	Aug 1898	Sep 1898

== Preservation ==
The engine Clara is still on display outside the Nababeep Museum. Judging from the location of the steam dome it would seem that, at the time of its retirement, the locomotive was equipped with one of the later boilers with a longer firebox, originally fitted on engine no. 7 Albion.

A live steam replica/model was constructed by Davey McFarlane, a member of the Bloemfontein Society of Model Engineers and was run as a club loco at Modenso Park in Bloemfontein.

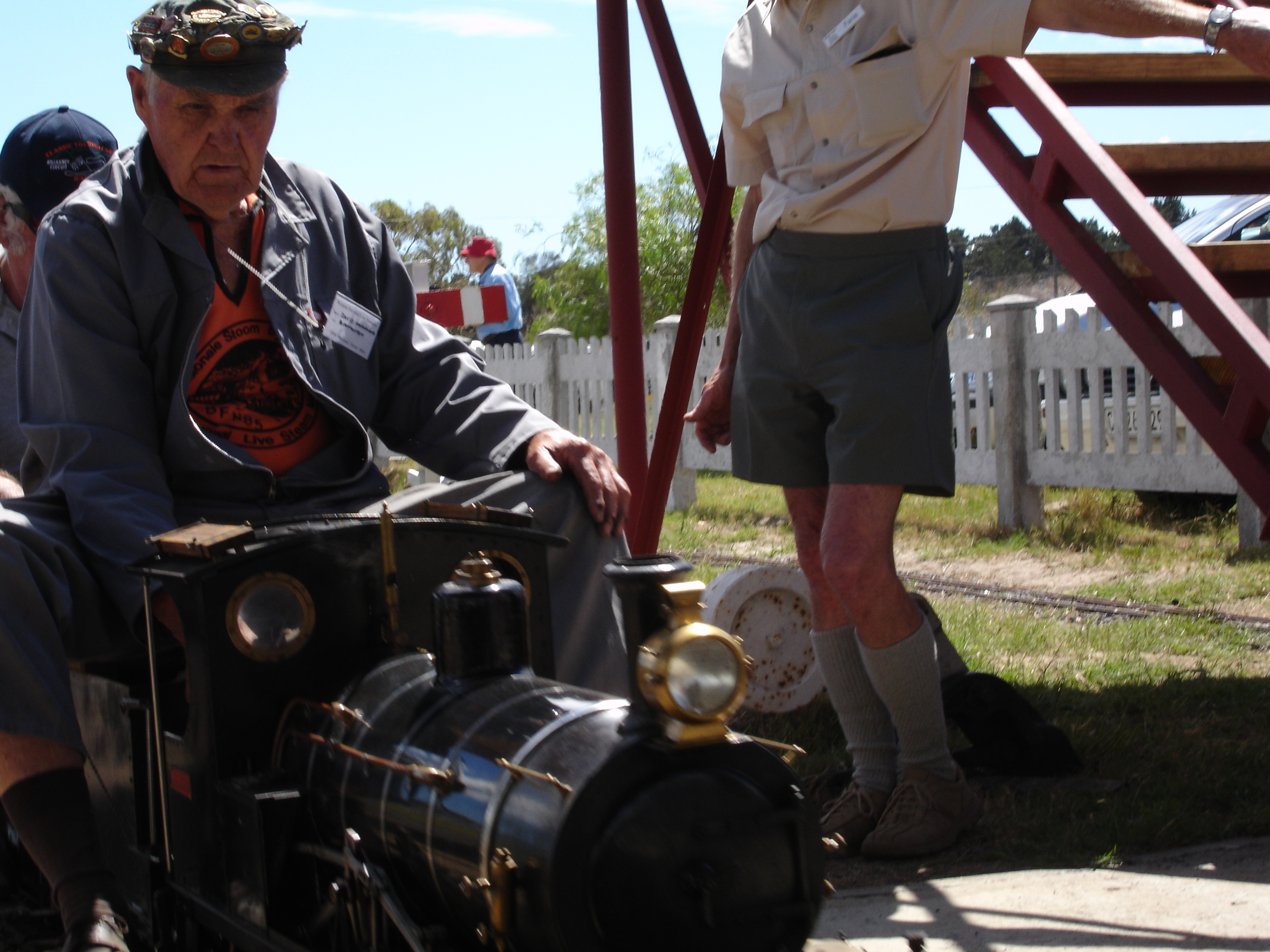
Clara - Live Steam Model As Constructed and Driven by Davey McFarlane
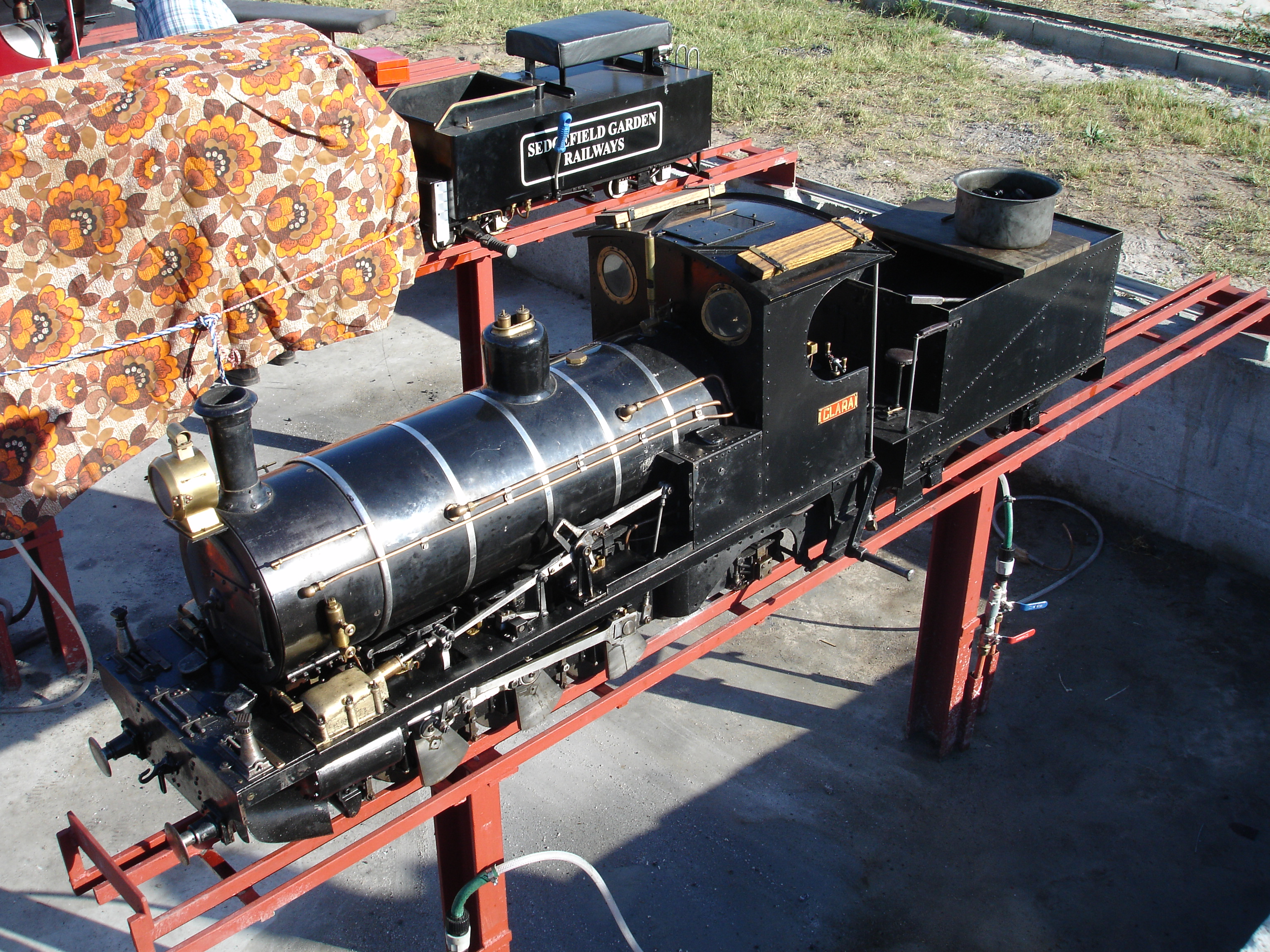
Clare Live Steam Model - As Constructed By Davey McFarlane
