= Namaqualand 0-4-0WT Condenser =

South African steam locomotive

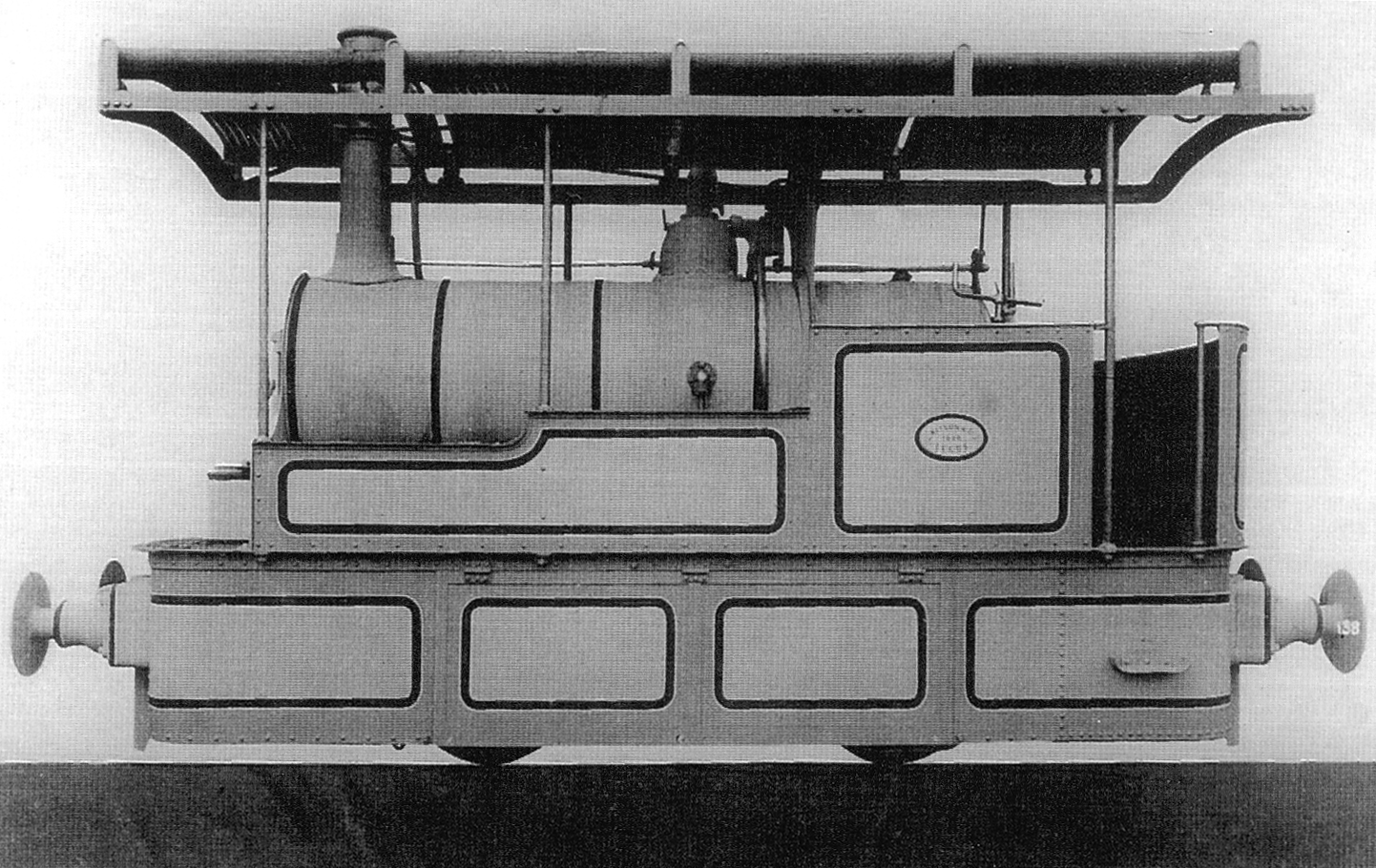
- Kitson works picture of no. 1 John Taylor, c. 1886
Type and origin
- Power type: Steam
- Designer: Kitson and Company
- Builder: Kitson and Company
- Serial number: T198, T220, T234
- Build date: 1886-1888
Specifications
- Configuration
  - Whyte: 0-4-0WT
  - UIC: Bn2t
- Driver: 2nd coupled axle
- Gauge: 2 ft 6 in (762 mm) Namaqualand
- Coupled dia.: 34 in (864 mm)
- Wheelbase: 6 ft (1,829 mm)
- Adhesive weight: 14 LT 4 cwt (14,430 kg)
- Loco weight: 14 LT 4 cwt (14,430 kg)
- Tender weight: 8 LT 18 cwt (9,043 kg)
- Tender type: 2-axle
- Fuel type: Coal
- Fuel capacity: 16 cu ft (0.45 m^{3})
- Coolant cap.: 423 sq ft (39.3 m^{2}) cond. surface
- Water cap.: 386 imp gal (1,750 L)
- Firebox
  - Type: Round-top
  - Grate area: 7.3 sq ft (0.68 m^{2})
- Boiler pressure: 150 psi (1,034 kPa)
- Heating surface
  - Firebox: 30 sq ft (2.8 m^{2})
  - Tubes: 157.6 sq ft (14.64 m^{2})
  - Total surface: 187.6 sq ft (17.43 m^{2})
- Cylinders: Two
- Cylinder size: 9 in (229 mm) bore 15 in (381 mm) stroke
- Valve gear: Stephenson
- Couplers: Buffers-and-chain
Performance figures
- Tractive effort: 4,020 lbf (17.9 kN) @ 75%
Career
- Operators: Cape Copper Mining Company; Cape Copper Company
- Number in class: 3
- Numbers: 1-3
- Official name: John Taylor, Juanita & Jackal
- Delivered: 1886-1888
- First run: 1886

The Cape Copper Mining Company 0-4-0WT Condenser of 1886 was a South African steam locomotive from the pre-Union era in the Cape of Good Hope.

Between 1886 and 1888, three 0-4-0WT condensing locomotives were placed in service by the Cape Copper Mining Company on its 2 ft 6 in (762 mm) gauge Namaqualand Railway between Port Nolloth and O'okiep in the Cape of Good Hope. They were the first condensing steam locomotives to enter service in South Africa.

== Namaqualand Railway ==
The Namaqualand Railway was constructed between 1869 and 1876 by the Cape Copper Mining Company, restructured as the Cape Copper Company in 1888. The 93 1/2-mile-long (150-kilometre) railway from Port Nolloth on the West Coast to the copper mines around O'okiep was initially exclusively mule-powered, but in 1871 two 0-6-0T locomotives named John King and Miner were acquired by the mining company on an experimental basis. Their use appears to have been restricted mainly to the coastal section of the railway. By July 1887 both of them were permanently out of service.

== The Kitson condensers ==
Between 1886 and 1888, three 0-4-0Tcondensing locomotives were acquired from Kitson and Company. They were named John Taylor, Juanita and Jackal respectively and, like the earlier 0-6-0T locomotives, they were operated with tenders due to the scarcity of water along the line. The tenders for the first two locomotives seem to have been acquired separately.

The condensing equipment was mounted overhead in a roof-like frame and consisted of copper coils which formed an atmospheric radiator. Condensed steam was fed back for re-use into the large water tank underneath the locomotive's copper boiler. To protect the motion and bearings as well as working parts of the valve gear above the running boards from wind-blown sand, the locomotive was equipped with sheet-metal casing above and below the running boards, with the centre part of the bottom encasement hinged to allow access to the motion.

The builder's picture of the locomotive shows it without a cab and with only a spectacle plate for crew protection, but in photographs of the locomotives in service, they have cab roofs installed underneath the overhead condensing coils.

=== The engine John Taylor ===
The first condensing locomotive, no. 1, named John Taylor after a director of the Cape Copper Mining Company, was built in 1886 with Kitson works number T198. It was delivered in mid-1886 and commenced trial runs in July 1886 before entering service on the 22-mile-long (35-kilometre) section from Port Nolloth to Abbevlaack in August 1886.

=== The engine Juanita ===
Engine no. 2, named Juanita, was also built in 1886 with Kitson works number T220, and was delivered in March 1887. When it entered service, the working range of the two condensing locomotives was extended to Anenous, a distance of 47 1/2 miles (76 kilometres) from Port Nolloth, and possibly all the way to Steinkopf at 59 miles (95 kilometres). Gross train weights, excluding tenders, for the section to Anenous were 67 tons up and 155 tons down, with 34 trucks in a train.

=== The engine Jackal ===
Engine no. 3, named Jackal, built in 1888 with Kitson works number T234, was delivered in December of that year and entered service in January 1889. Unlike the other two, it was delivered with a tender. In May 1894, the engine Jackal took the record for the fastest run between O'okiep and Port Nolloth, hauling a one-coach special in just under four hours at an average speed of about 23 miles per hour (37 kilometres per hour).

== Service ==
After the arrival of their successor tender locomotives beginning in 1890, it was possible to introduce a through steam-hauled service from the coast to O'okiep from 15 May 1893. The condensing locomotives were then relegated to lesser duties, mainly ballast, sand clearing and other work trains. They also served as standby power to cover breakdowns and overhauls of the new mainline locomotives.

From December 1896, one of them was allocated to O'okiep for shunting and local work, including service as construction locomotive while the Nababeep branchline was being built, and then as branchline power after the line was opened in late 1898 or early 1899. The locomotives were rotated occasionally and all three had service spells as the O'okiep engine. By 1910 they were no longer used on the Nababeep line since the trains had become too heavy.

As a result of the poor quality of water in the region and tough working conditions, the three locomotives suffered major problems with their fireboxes and tubes and replacements were required fairly frequently. As an example, the engine Juanita required a new boiler and firebox in 1895, just eight years after entering service. The condensing system was also never successful due to the high ambient temperatures in the region.

They remained in service on lower section traffic on the mainline until at least 1899. At some stage between then and late 1906, after they had been replaced on mainline service, their condensing equipment was removed, they lost their tenders and they were equipped with more substantial cabs and extended coal bunkers. According to the Cape Copper Company annual report on the year ending 30 April 1916, all three locomotives were still in service at that time.

== Illustration ==
The pictures serve to illustrate the Condensers in service, as well as some of the modifications which were done to them.

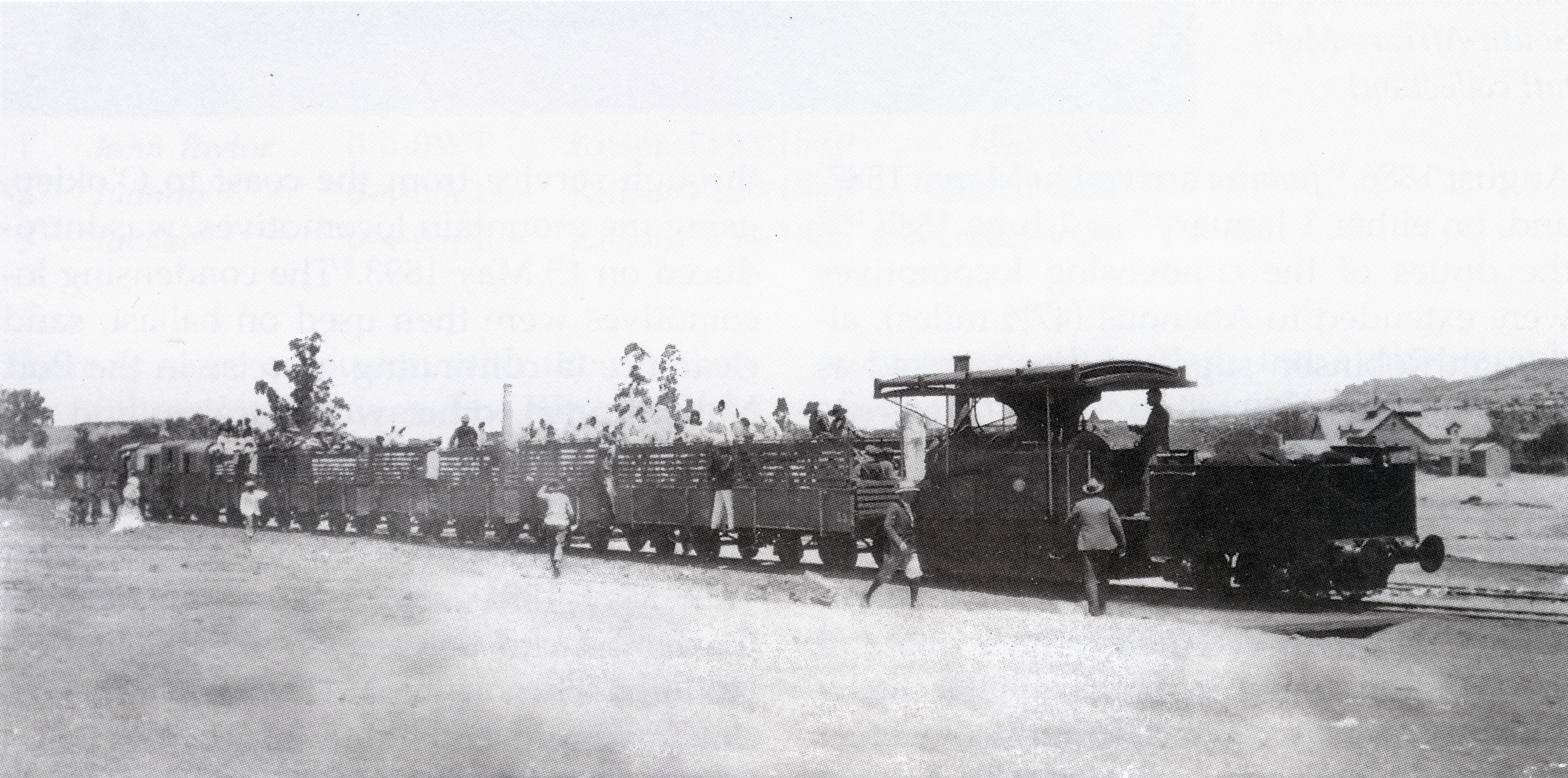
A condenser with tender working a company picnic train at O'okiep, c. 1890

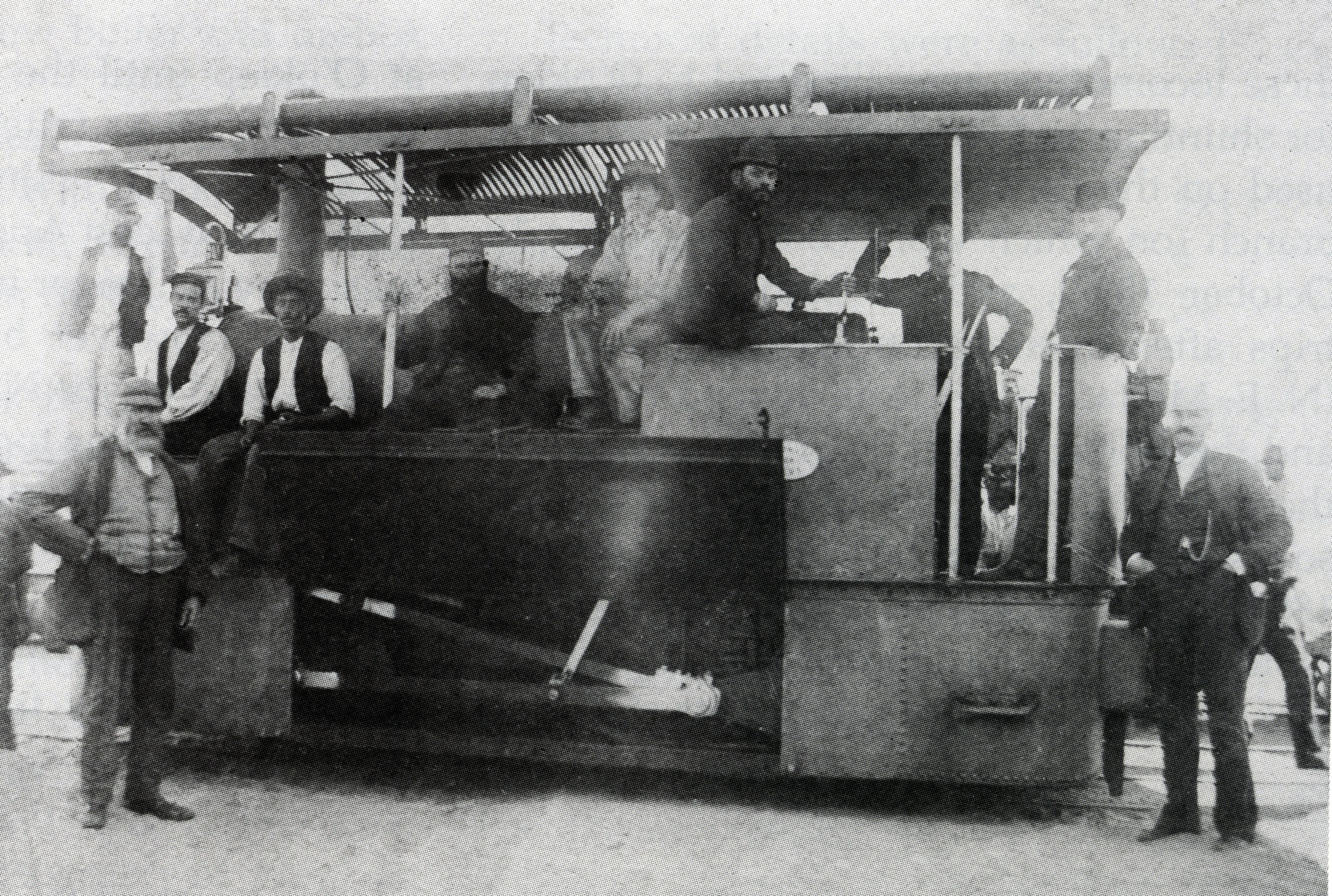
Possibly John Taylor, with cab roof installed and motion exposed, c. 1886

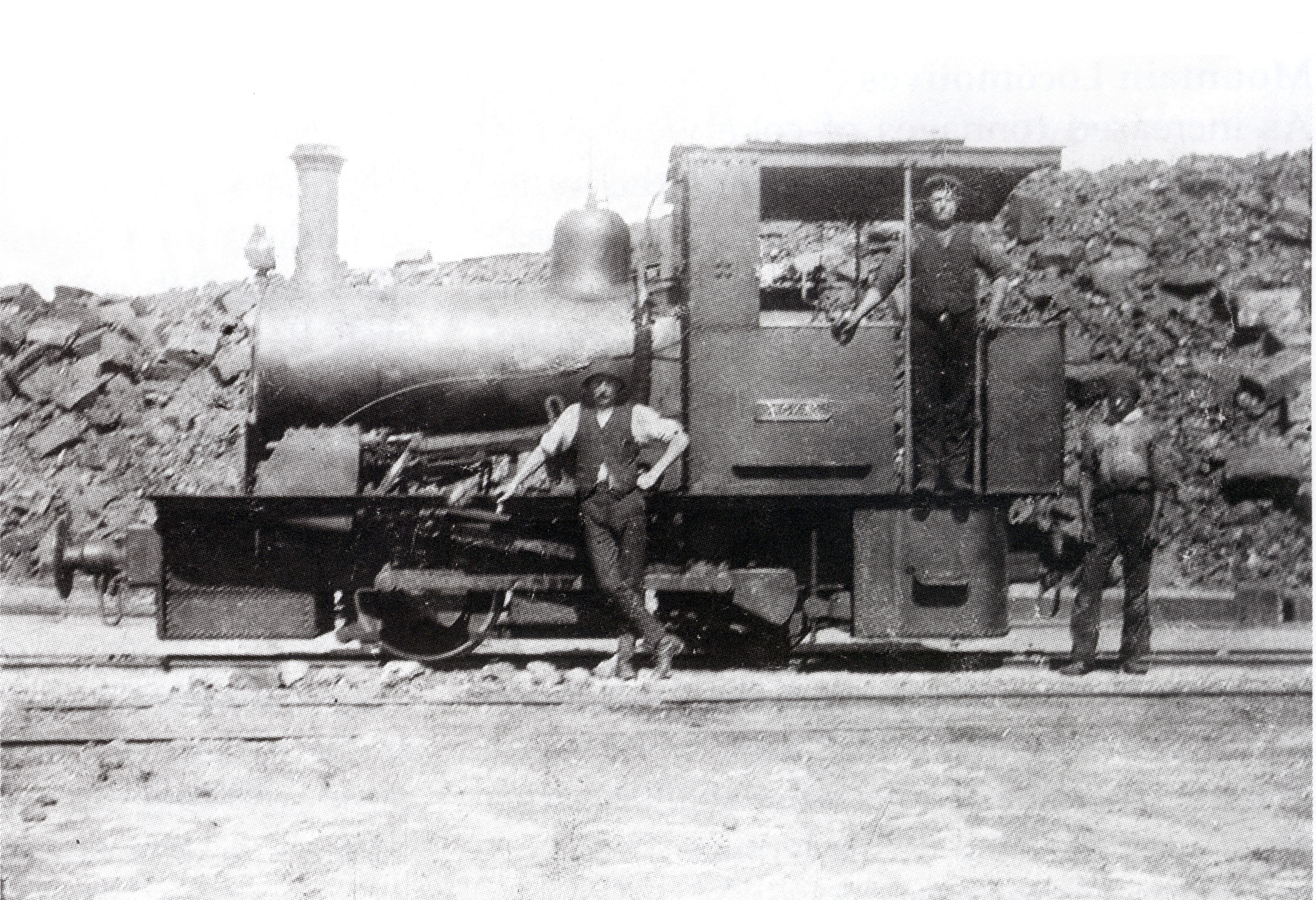
Jackal modified to non-condensing, with an extended bunker and altered cab, c. 1920
