= Namaqua =

Namaqua may refer to:

- Nama people of southern Africa
- Namaqua rain frog (Breviceps namaquensis)
- Namaqua dove (Oena capensis)
- Namaqua chameleon (Chamaeleo namaquensis)
- Namaqua darkling beetles, species in the genus Cryptochile
- Namaqua National Park, national park in South Africa
- Namaqua plated lizard (Gerrhosaurus typicus), is a species of lizard
- Namaqua sandgrouse (Pterocles namaqua), is a species of ground-dwelling bird
- Fort Namaqua, was a trading post from 1858 or 1859, Loveland, Colorado
- Herero and Nama genocide, campaign of ethnic extermination and collective punishment waged in German South West Africa (now Namibia)

== See also ==
- Namaqualand (disambiguation)
