= Nababeep =

- Location within Northern Cape Location within South Africa
- Coordinates: 29.59°S 17.784°E
- Country: South Africa
- Province: Northern Cape
- District: Namakwa
- Municipality: Nama Khoi

Area
  - Total: 123.13 km^{2} (47.54 sq mi)

Population (2011)
  - Total: 5,374
  - Density: 43.64/km^{2} (113.0/sq mi)

Racial makeup (2011)
  - Black African: 3.9%
  - Coloured: 91.2%
  - Indian/Asian: 0.5%
  - White: 4.2%
  - Other: 0.2%

First languages (2011)
  - Afrikaans: 96.2%
  - Xhosa: 1.5%
  - Other: 2.3%
- Time zone: UTC+2 (SAST)
- Postal code (street): 8265
- PO box: 8265

Nababeep is a town in Namakwa District Municipality in the Northern Cape province of South Africa.

Nababeep is an old copper-mining town in Namaqualand, 19 km north-west of Springbok. Founded in 1860 by the Okiep Copper Company. The name is of Khoekhoen origin and means ‘rhinoceros place’.
