= Okiep =

Okiep O'okiep
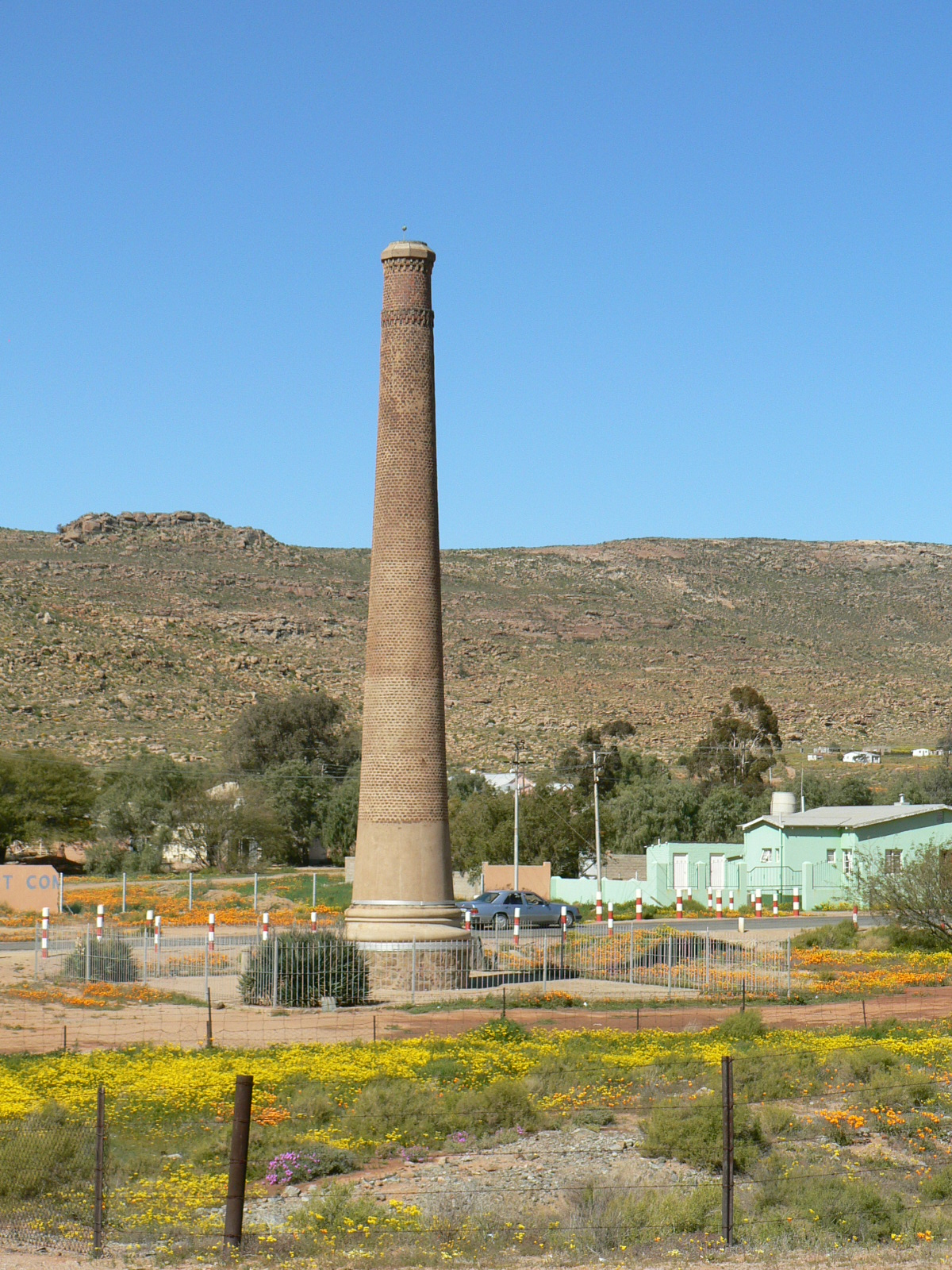
- Ventilation shaft built by the Cape Copper Company in 1880

- Location within Northern Cape Location within South Africa
- Coordinates: 29°35′45″S 17°52′51″E
- Country: South Africa
- Province: Northern Cape
- District: Namakwa
- Municipality: Nama Khoi

Area
  - Total: 38.63 km^{2} (14.92 sq mi)

Population (2011)
  - Total: 6,304
  - Density: 163.2/km^{2} (422.7/sq mi)

Racial makeup (2011)
  - Black African: 3.8%
  - Coloured: 93.8%
  - Indian/Asian: 0.3%
  - White: 1.1%
  - Other: 1.0%

First languages (2011)
  - Afrikaans: 96.2%
  - Xhosa: 1.0%
  - Other: 2.7%
- Time zone: UTC+2 (SAST)
- Postal code (street): 8270
- PO box: 8270
- Area code: 027

Okiep is a small town in the Northern Cape province of South Africa, and was in the 1870s ranked as having the richest copper mine in the world. The town is on the site of a spring that was known in the Khoekhoe language of the Nama people as U-gieb (large brackish place) and was originally spelled as O'okiep.

== History ==
Early settlers in the Cape Colony heard rumors of mountains in the north-west that were fabulously rich in copper. Governor Simon van der Stel was inclined to believe these tales when, in 1681, a group of Namas visited the Castle in Cape Town and brought along some pure copper. Van der Stel himself led a major expedition in 1685 and reached the fabled mountains on 21 October. Three shafts were sunk and revealed a rich lode of copper ore; the shafts exist to this day. For almost 200 years nothing was done about the discovery, largely because of its remote location. The explorer James Alexander was the first to follow up on van der Stel's discovery. In 1852 he examined the old shafts, discovered some other copper outcrops and started mining operations. Prospectors, miners, and speculators rushed to the area, but many companies collapsed when the logistical difficulties became apparent.

The first miners were Cornish, and brought with them the expertise of centuries of tin-mining in Cornwall. The ruins of the buildings they constructed, as well as the stonework of the bridges and culverts of the railway built to transport the ore to Port Nolloth, can still be seen. The Namaqualand Railway started operating in 1876 and lasted for 68 years, carrying ore to Port Nolloth and returning with equipment and provisions. The carriages were initially pulled by mules and horses, which were later replaced by steam locomotives — the last of these, the Clara, stands at Nababeep. Nowadays, road transport is used to convey the ore to the railhead at Bitterfontein. The other principal mines of the area are at Carolusberg and Nababeep.

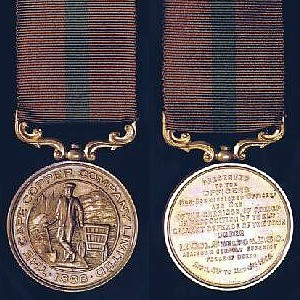
The Cape Copper Company Medal for the Defence of O'okiep

Okiep’s mine saw action on 4 April 1902 during the Anglo-Boer war when some 700 officers and men of the 3rd Battalion Queen's Royal Regiment, 5th Royal Warwickshire Regiment, Namaqualand Border Scouts, the Town Guard, and the Cape Garrison Artillery withstood a 30-day siege by Jan Smuts’ forces. The village of Concordia, with a garrison of 100 men, surrendered a day after the siege started. On 4 May 1902 a British relief column arrived from Port Nolloth and ended the siege. A ruined blockhouse is still visible on a hill north-east of the town.

As with most metals, copper suffered mixed fortunes, and in the early 20th century, the copper price dropped below the profitable level, so that mining operations ceased, but were resumed when prices rose.

== See also ==
- Cape Copper Company Medal for the Defence of O'okiep
