= Namaqualand 0-6-0T =

Type of steam locomotive

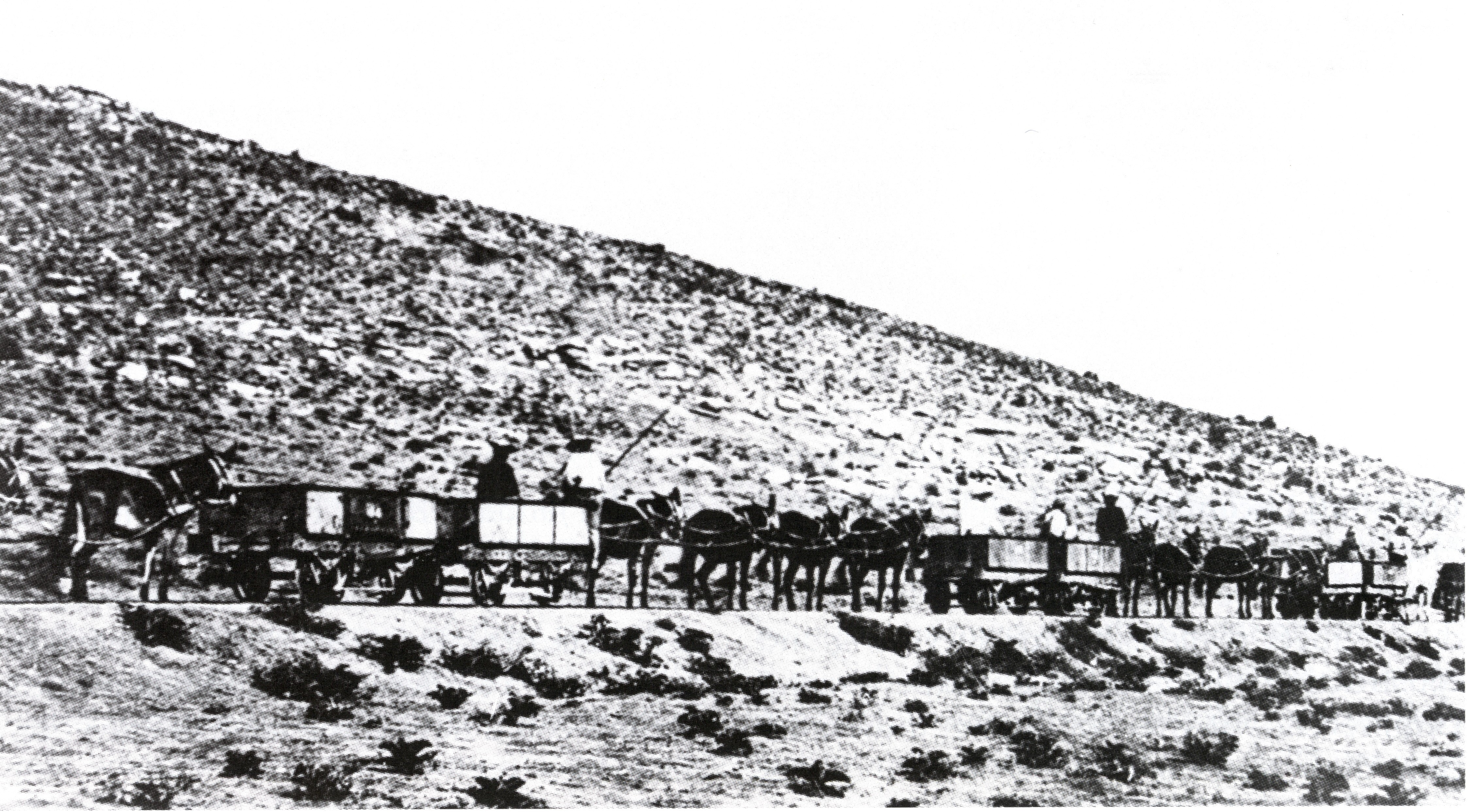
- Namaqualand Railway mule train, c. 1876
Type and origin
- Power type: Steam
- Designer: Lilleshall Company
- Builder: Lilleshall Company
- Serial number: 171, 190
- Build date: 1870, 1871
Specifications
- Configuration
  - Whyte: 0-6-0T
  - UIC: Cn2t
- Gauge: 2 ft 6 in (762 mm) Namaqualand
- Coupled dia.: 22 in (559 mm)
- Adhesive weight: 6 LT 10 cwt (6,604 kg)
- Loco weight: 6 LT 10 cwt (6,604 kg)
- Tender weight: 3 LT (3,048 kg)
- Fuel type: Coal
- Boiler pressure: 100 psi (689 kPa) normal working 120 psi (827 kPa) maximum
- Cylinders: Two
- Cylinder size: John King: 6 in (152 mm) bore 12 in (305 mm) stroke Miner: 7 in (178 mm) bore 14 in (356 mm) stroke
Performance figures
- Tractive effort: 1,473 lbf (6.55 kN) @ 100 psi (689 kPa); 1,760 lbf (7.8 kN) @ 120 psi (827 kPa)
Career
- Operators: Cape Copper Mining Company
- Number in class: 2
- Official name: John King & Miner
- Delivered: 1871
- First run: 1871

The Namaqualand 0-6-0T of 1871 were two South African steam locomotives from the pre-Union era in the Cape of Good Hope.

In 1871, two 2 ft 6 in (762 mm) gauge 0-6-0T locomotives were placed in service by the Cape Copper Mining Company. They were the first steam locomotives to enter service on the hitherto mule-powered Namaqualand Railway between Port Nolloth and the Namaqualand copper mines around O'okiep in the northwestern Cape of Good Hope.

== Cape Copper Company ==
The Cape Copper Company had its origin in the Cape Copper Mining Company, which was established in 1862 or 1863 as the Cape of Good Hope Copper Mining Company, to take over the copper mining properties of Phillips & King, an enterprise which had been involved in copper mining in Namaqualand since the 1850s. John King, one of the members of the defunct Phillips & King, was appointed a director of the new mining company. The Cape Copper Mining Company was restructured as the Cape Copper Company in 1888.

== Namaqualand Railway ==
Copper ore had to be transported by ox wagon from the mines around O'okiep to the harbour at Port Nolloth on the West Coast. The poor roads through mountainous areas hindered development of the mines and the already high transport cost was often aggravated by droughts and animal sickness. This eventually led to the decision by the mining company to build a light railway between the port and the mines, on advice from civil engineer R. Thomas Hall, Superintendent of the narrow gauge Redruth and Chacewater Railway in Cornwall.

The proposed construction of a narrow gauge railway in the Cape of Good Hope dates back to 1854, when the board of the Cape Town Railway and Dock Company considered a proposal to construct a railway between Port Nolloth and O'okiep in Namaqualand. Since they were not empowered to authorise such construction, the proposal was forwarded to the London board with a recommendation for its favourable consideration.

The first 48 miles (77 kilometres) long section of the Namaqualand Railway, from Port Nolloth to Nonams, was authorised by the Cape Government under Act no. 4 of 1869 and construction of the 2 ft 6 in (762 mm) gauge railway commenced on 4 September 1869. Anenous, to the west of Nonams, was reached on 1 January 1871. Nonams was bypassed by the railway and Steinkopf was reached in 1873. The 93 1/2 miles (150 kilometres) long line between Port Nolloth and O'okiep was opened for mule traction on 1 January 1876.

The line passed through sandy terrain from the coast and then made a rapid ascent of 2,000 feet (610 metres), about 35 miles (56 kilometres) inland, with a very steep gradient en route in Dick's Cutting.

Since the railway was to be mule-powered, it was constructed using iron bridge rails, mounted on longitudinal sleepers in order to allow free passage to the animals that worked the line. Typical mule trains were made up of ten pairs of wagons, each pair hauled by four mules harnessed in tandem.

== The Lilleshall locomotives ==
Even though the Act of 1869, which authorised the construction of the first section of the railway to Nonams, near Anenous, did not provide for the use of steam power on the line, two "illegal" tank locomotives were acquired by the mining company on an experimental basis in 1871. They were built by Lilleshall Company of Oakengates in Shropshire in 1870 and 1871. To date, no photographs or drawings of either of the locomotives have been found, but they are known to have been non-identical six-wheeled side-tank engines.

The first section of 22 miles (35 kilometres) from Port Nolloth was only officially opened for steam traction on 1 August 1886, a further 26 miles (42 kilometres) on 1 June 1887 and the line through to O’okiep on 15 March 1893.

=== The engine John King ===
The first locomotive, named John King after the company director and former head of the defunct Phillips & King, arrived in Port Nolloth on the ship Ocean King in December 1870 or January 1871. It was a six-coupled tank engine, which was used with a separate tender because of the shortage of water along the line. It is unclear whether the tender was also imported or constructed locally. The locomotive had cylinders of 6 inches (152 millimetres) bore and 12 inches (305 millimetres) stroke.

The engine John King entered service on 1 February 1871, making daily round trips from Port Nolloth to the 35 Miles Station, hauling as many as ten wagons with gross train weights of 20 tons up and 35 tons down.

=== The engine Miner ===
The second locomotive, named Miner, arrived in September 1871. This locomotive was larger, with cylinders of 7 inches (178 millimetres) bore and 14 inches (356 millimetres) stroke. Apart from the cylinder size, no other details about this locomotive are known and the rest of the specifications as shown in the table are all applicable to the engine John King only. While the engine Miner was also six-wheeled, it has not been confirmed that it was also six-coupled and it could therefore possibly have been of a 0-4-2 or 2-4-0 wheel arrangement. The fact that it was larger than the engine John King, however, makes it likely that it was also of a 0-6-0 wheel arrangement. It is presumed to also have been used in a tank-and-tender configuration.

== Service ==
The locomotives were less than successful. They turned out to be too light, were adversely affected by the sandy conditions and suffered frequent boiler tube failures. At one stage in 1873, only two years after entering service, both locomotives were reported as being under repair, with mules handling all traffic. Both engines were withdrawn from mainline service in 1876 and relegated to hauling ballast trains and emergency use. By 1884, the engine Miner was dismantled, awaiting boiler repairs which never happened. The engine John King was still at work in May 1887, but in July its boiler was borrowed to replace the failed boiler of the tug Nolloth. The borrowed boiler was returned in November 1887, but the engine John King was never repaired again.
