= Port Nolloth =

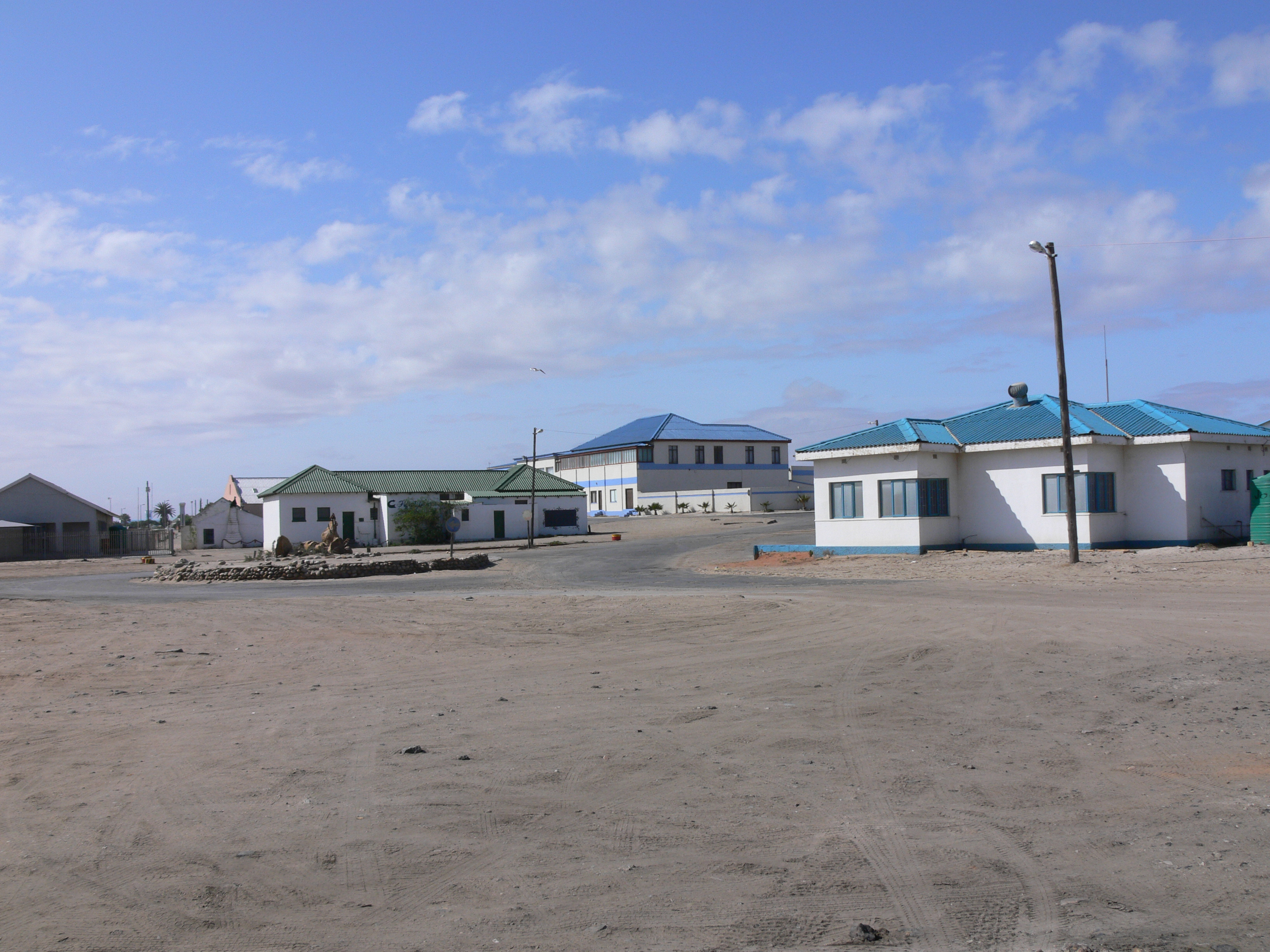
- Port Nolloth town, 2005

- Location within Northern Cape Location within South Africa
- Coordinates: 29°15′S 16°52′E
- Country: South Africa
- Province: Northern Cape
- District: Namakwa
- Municipality: Richtersveld
- Established: 1854

Area
  - Total: 30.32 km^{2} (11.71 sq mi)

Population (2011)
  - Total: 6,092
  - Density: 200.9/km^{2} (520.4/sq mi)

Racial makeup (2011)
  - Black African: 16.2%
  - Coloured: 72.0%
  - Indian/Asian: 0.6%
  - White: 10.2%
  - Other: 1.0%

First languages (2011)
  - Afrikaans: 85.2%
  - Xhosa: 7.0%
  - English: 3.5%
  - Sotho: 1.1%
  - Other: 3.1%
- Time zone: UTC+2 (SAST)
- Postal code (street): 8280
- PO box: 8280
- Area code: 027

Port Nolloth is a town and seaport in the Namaqualand region on the northwestern coast of South Africa, 144 kilometres (89 mi) northwest of Springbok. It is the seat of the Richtersveld Local Municipality.

The port was previously a transshipment point for copper from the Okiep mines and diamonds from the Namaqua coast. Since the 1970s, the main seagoing activities have been fishing and small-vessel tourism. Today the town is a commercial hub with several holiday homes and a caravan park at the adjacent McDougalls Bay. It is also a gateway to the Richtersveld National Park, located 160 kilometres (99 mi) to the north along the Orange River.

== History ==
The bay where the port is located was known by the indigenous Nama people as Aukwatowa ('Where the water took away the old man'). Its location was marked by Portuguese explorer Bartolomeu Dias on his voyage around the Cape of Good Hope in 1487. It was the last landfall he sighted before a wild storm blew his ship off course and out to sea for 30 days.

The land surrounding the bay remained virtually uninhabited until James Alexander's discovery in 1852 of copper at Okiep, 160 kilometres (99 mi) inland from the bay. The Cape Colony administration immediately commenced a survey of the coastline to locate a suitable harbour from which to ship the copper ore. Aukwatowa Bay was surveyed in 1854, and selected for a future port based largely on its sheltered aspect from offshore winds.

=== Copper shipments ===
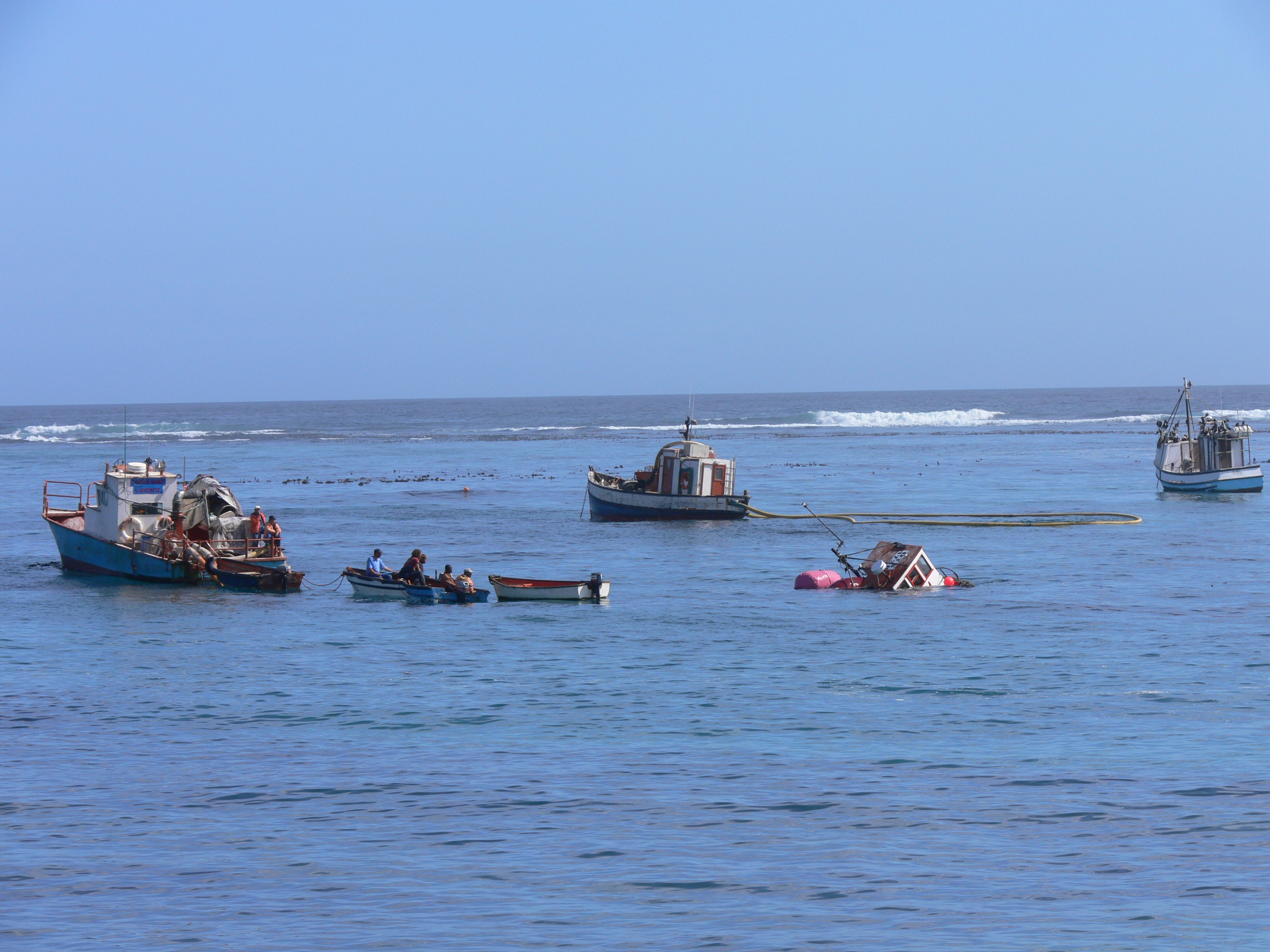
Fishing vessels and diamond prospectors in Port Nolloth harbour

A rudimentary quay was built in 1855, wide enough to accommodate the horse-drawn wagons that carried the copper ore from Okiep to the port. A small service town rapidly developed and was named Port Nolloth by Cape Colony Governor Sir George Grey, in honour of its surveyor, Captain M.S. Nolloth.

In 1874, the wagons were replaced by the 154 km (96 mi) long Namaqualand Railway between the mine and the port and the quay was lengthened to 67 m (220 ft). However, while the railway significantly improved overland transport to the port, the increasing size of ore carriers began to create navigational difficulties in the bay. By the early 1900s, the sheltered aspect that had attracted surveyors fifty years before was proving too difficult for larger vessels, several of which ran aground on a coastal reef extending across the channel. The difficulties of the harbour and expensive ship repairs encouraged the development of an alternative transport route and by 1910 most Okiep ore was being carried by truck to the railhead at Bitterfontein in preference to shipments direct from the port.

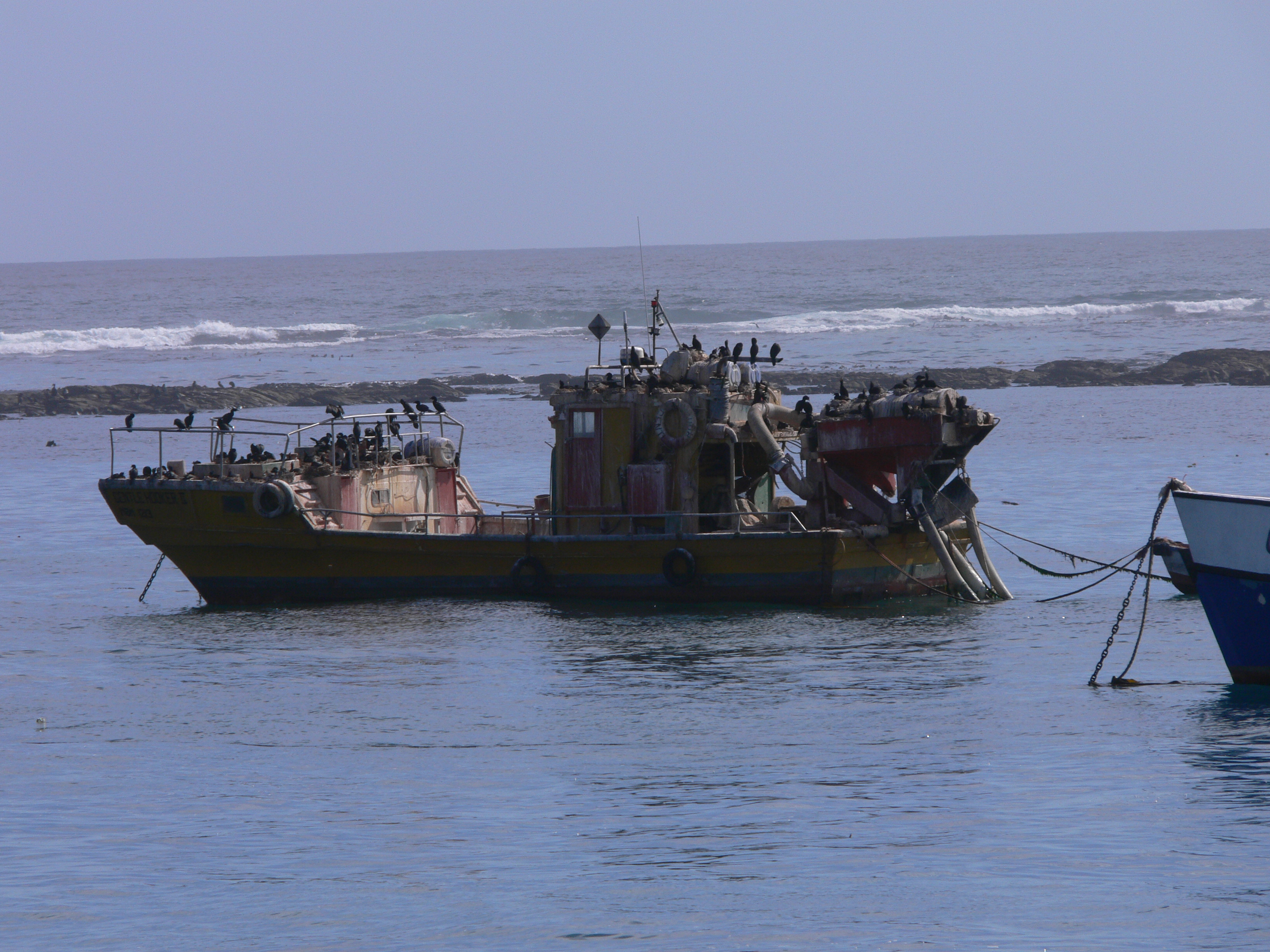
An abandoned trawler, damaged on the reef across the mouth of the Port channel

=== Diamond mining ===
With ore shipments declining, the Port was revived in 1926 with the discovery of alluvial diamonds along the coast to the north and south of the town. A rush of prospectors and investment re-established Port Nolloth as a substantial service centre, even as copper shipments ceased altogether in 1944.

The inability of larger vessels to enter the port led to a series of disasters as ships attempted to anchor offshore rather than seek shelter in poor weather. In April 1947, the 205-ton South African freighter Border ran aground to the south of the port while attempting to ride out a storm. In December 1950, the 400-ton freighter Bechuana suffered a similar fate.

In the years following these wrecks, efforts were made to improve port access with the underwater blasting of the coastal reef. The attempt was partially successful but the bay remained a challenging prospect. Demand for port access also declined in the 1970s as the volume of diamond exports decreased.

Income now averages between R30 000 and R40 000 per month for the more experienced divers.

=== Closure of the Port ===
After 1976, large-scale shipping at Port Nolloth was reduced to a single tanker, the Oranjemund, which visited the port fortnightly to exchange supplies for fish and diamonds. 61 metres long with a draft of 4.4 metres, the Oranjemund was well-suited for the navigational difficulties of the bay. However, the gradual reduction in diamond discoveries made the long voyage from Cape Town uneconomic, and the Oranjemund was withdrawn from service in 2006. Port activity now consists of minor fishing vessels and recreational boating. Silting of the harbour floor has further reduced the draft, and the smallest vessels can access the 67-metre quay.

== Climate ==
The cold Benguela Current in the Atlantic Ocean off the west coast of South Africa impacts the climate of the coastal region. The average daily maximum in summer is just above 20 °C (68 °F) with a variation of less than 4 degrees between the hottest and coldest months of the year at Port Nolloth. On average the temperature reaches 30 °C (86 °F) on 15 days per year, compared to an average of 220 days per year at Vioolsdrif, less than 100 kilometres (62 mi) to the north-east. The west coast is regularly frequented by a thick fog bank rolling in from the cold ocean, a phenomenon locally known as the Malmokkie.

Port Nolloth is located in the southern part of the Namib desert and on average receives about 72 millimetres (2.8 in) of precipitation per year.

Climate data for Port Nolloth
Month	Jan	Feb	Mar	Apr	May	Jun	Jul	Aug	Sep	Oct	Nov	Dec	Year
Mean daily maximum °C (°F)	20.3 (68.5)	20.2 (68.4)	19.9 (67.8)	19.4 (66.9)	19.2 (66.6)	19.1 (66.4)	17.9 (64.2)	17.4 (63.3)	17.6 (63.7)	18.1 (64.6)	19.1 (66.4)	19.8 (67.6)	19.0 (66.2)
Daily mean °C (°F)	16.4 (61.5)	16.5 (61.7)	15.9 (60.6)	15.1 (59.2)	14.2 (57.6)	13.9 (57.0)	12.9 (55.2)	12.8 (55.0)	13.3 (55.9)	14.1 (57.4)	15.2 (59.4)	16.1 (61.0)	14.7 (58.5)
Mean daily minimum °C (°F)	12.6 (54.7)	12.8 (55.0)	11.9 (53.4)	10.9 (51.6)	9.3 (48.7)	8.8 (47.8)	8.0 (46.4)	8.2 (46.8)	9.0 (48.2)	10.1 (50.2)	11.3 (52.3)	12.5 (54.5)	10.4 (50.7)
Average precipitation mm (inches)	2 (0.1)	2 (0.1)	4 (0.2)	9 (0.4)	8 (0.3)	13 (0.5)	11 (0.4)	9 (0.4)	4 (0.2)	5 (0.2)	2 (0.1)	3 (0.1)	72 (3)
Source: Climate-Data.org

== Tourism ==
=== Port Nolloth Museum ===
The Port Nolloth Museum was situated within Port Nolloth. The building which housed the museum was built in 1880 and was transformed into a museum in the 2000s. The museum closed down after the owner and curator George Moyses died on Friday, September 30, 2022. He was a local legend and is still mourned by the community. :

Relics at the museum showcased the history and culture of Port Nolloth, including:

- porcelain shards from shipwrecks,
- slave bracelets that washed up on the port of the town from a ship called HMS Black Joke,
- antique medicine bottles that contain citronella oil and liquorice powder,
- an antique Nama bible,
- ostrich-shell fragments used by the Khoi and San for water containers,
- Khoi clay pot pieces.

The museum also contained a large collection of photographs and artifacts from the time of copper ore shipments between 1854 and 1920. With the development of mining, the Port Nolloth harbour became of greater significance as one of two harbours used for the export of copper ore and more importantly, for the import of food and capital equipment.

The museum also contained photos and artifacts of the diamond mining period. The town declined in the early 1900s but was revived with the discovery of alluvial diamonds in the area in 1926. The harbour was deepened and enlarged in the 1970s and diamond mines, diamond diving and fishery continue to operate in the area

=== Old train tracks ===
The old train tracks in Port Nolloth, constructed in the late 19th century, played a pivotal role in the region's copper mining industry. This narrow-gauge railway, spanning over 150 kilometers, connected the mining town of Okiep to the port, facilitating the transportation of copper ore to international markets. The railway's construction began in 1869 under the supervision of engineer Richard Thomas Hall. By December 1870, the line had reached Muishondfontein, 77 kilometers from the sea. Initially, the tramway was designed for animal-drawn traffic, utilizing a 30-inch gauge with light rails bolted to longitudinal sleepers, allowing animals to traverse the line freely. Okiep, in the 1870s, was renowned for having the richest copper mine globally, and the railway was instrumental in exporting copper to international markets, significantly contributing to the local economy. Due to the scarcity of water along the route, steam locomotives were initially impractical, leading to the use of animal-drawn carriages. Although the main railway line between Port Nolloth and Okiep remained operational until 1945, it was eventually decommissioned, and much of the line was sold as scrap. However, sections between Nababeep and Okiep continued in service until 1950, when improved road infrastructure rendered the railway obsolete.

Today, remnants of the old train tracks are still visible in Port Nolloth's main road.

=== The salt pan ===
The Port Nolloth Salt Pan is located north of the town. Historically, the salt pan served multiple community purposes, including being used as a cricket field and as a landing spot for light aircraft. Ecologically, the salt pan provides a habitat for various bird species, including the lesser flamingo and the Cape shoveler, which are attracted by its saline environment that supports feeding and nesting. Archaeological studies around the salt pan have uncovered isolated historical artifacts such as glass and ceramics, particularly along its eastern margin, suggesting human activity in the area.

=== The “Sloepe” ===
The "Sloepe" is a geological site located in McDougalls Bay, approximately 5 kilometers from the center of Port Nolloth. This area features skewed rocks indicative of the metamorphic events that took place within the Namaqua-Natal Province. During the Neoproterozoic era, the region experienced significant tectonic and metamorphic events that led to the formation of various rock types, including orthoquartzites, feldspathic quartzites, arkoses, and volcanics. These formations are evident along the coastal strip from Kleinzee to Cliff Point, where the "Sloepe" is located.

=== Fishing industry and factory ruins in Port Nolloth ===
For much of the 20th century, fishing served as a key economic driver for the town. The establishment of fish processing factories in the area helped support this industry. However, over time, economic challenges and changes in the fishing sector led to the decline of these factories. By 1993, many of the fish processing facilities had ceased operations. Factory ruins remain along the town's coast. Climate-adaptation work in the Port Nolloth area has included safety-at-sea tracking systems for small-scale fishers, supported through the Community Adaptation Small Grants Facility in which Conservation South Africa acted as the Namakwa facilitating agency.

=== Port Nolloth Lighthouse ===
The Port Nolloth Lighthouse is a structure located on the western shore of Port Nolloth, Northern Cape, South Africa. It is the northernmost lighthouse on the western coast of South Africa. The lighthouse is 11 meters tall, constructed from aluminium lattice, and features a distinctive triangular day marker painted in black and white stripes.

The Port Nolloth Lighthouse was first commissioned in 1906 after a petition was submitted to the Cape colonial government for the establishment of a permanent coastal light at Port Nolloth. The lighthouse also incorporated a fog signal, which was introduced in 1909. The original lighthouse tower was an 18.5-meter cast-iron red column, supported by four heavy steel wire guys anchored in concrete. To reach the small balcony at the top of the tower, one had to climb an inclined ladder. During the town's economic changes, the lighthouse continued to serve as an navigation aid.

In the 1970s, the lighthouse was automated and replaced by the current aluminium lattice tower. The new lighthouse was relocated about 50 meters inland, while the original tower was decommissioned. Today, the lighthouse still serves its purpose, with a lighting system that flashes either red or white to indicate whether there is enough water over the reefs outside the bay to safely enter the harbor.

=== KaiKai Wall of Expression ===
The KaiKai Wall of Expression is a mosaic wall located in Port Nolloth. It was created as part of the development of the KaiKai residential estate. The name "KaiKai" is derived from the Nama language, meaning "to cultivate, to elevate with praise, or to nurture with pride."

Designed in a Gaudi-esque style, the wall features a series of mosaic installations and columns interspersed with open spaces, rather than a solid structure. This design approach is meant to symbolize the fluidity and interconnectedness of the community. Local residents were invited to participate in the creation of the mosaics. The project also provided employment and artistic training to many individuals in the area.

=== KaiKai Parkrun ===
The KaiKai parkrun is a 5-kilometer event held every Saturday at 8:00 AM in Port Nolloth. It is the westernmost parkrun event in South Africa. It is part of the global parkrun initiative, which encourages people of all ages and fitness levels to participate in regular physical activity. The event is open to everyone, whether participants wish to run, jog, walk, or volunteer.
