= Scully (surname) =

Scully is a surname from Gaelic name Ó Scolaidhe, which means "student".

Notable people with the surname include:

== People ==
- Francis Scully, American sailor
- Carl Scully, Australian politician
- Cornelius D. Scully, American politician, mayor of Pittsburgh
- Frank Scully, American journalist and UFO author
- Frank Scully (politician), Australian politician
- Gary Scully (1933–2011), Australian journalist and foreign correspondent
- Hugh Scully, British TV presenter
- James Scully (disambiguation), several people
- John Scully (journalist), Canadian journalist (BBC, CBC, TVNZ), author of Am I Dead Yet? a journalist's perspective on terror
- Iceman John Scully, John "Iceman" Scully, American professional boxer
- Kevin Scully (New Hampshire politician)
- Kevin Scully (Vermont politician)
- Marlan Scully, American physicist
- Matthew Scully, American journalist and speechwriter
- Maurice Scully, Irish poet
- Mike Scully, American television producer
- Pat Scully, Irish football player and manager
- Paul Scully, British Conservative Party politician, Member of Parliament
- Paul Scully (Australian politician), NSW Labor party politician
- Peter Scully, Australian criminal
- Reina Scully, Japanese-American YouTuber
- Rock Scully (1941–2014), American manager of the Grateful Dead
- Samantha Scully, American actress
- Sean Scully, Irish-American painter
- Sean Scully (actor), Australian actor
- Steve Scully, American journalist
- Terry Scully, British actor
- Thomas A. Scully, American healthcare administrator
- Thomas J. Scully, U.S. Congressmen for the state of New Jersey
- Tim Scully, American computer engineer and LSD producer
- Vin Scully, American sportscaster
- Vincent Scully (1920–2017), American architectural history professor and writer
- Vincent Scully (MP) (1810–1871), Irish politician
- William Scully (disambiguation), several people

== Fictional characters ==
- Dana Scully, on the American TV series The X-Files
- Felicity Scully, on the Australian soap opera Neighbours
- Francis Scully, title character of Scully, a British television programme broadcast on Channel 4
- Jack Scully, on Neighbours
- Sgt. Jack Scully, a recurring character on the American TV series M*A*S*H
- Jake Scully, protagonist of the 1984 American film Body Double
- Joe Scully, on Neighbours
- Lyn Scully, on Neighbours
- Michelle Scully, on Neighbours
- Norm Scully, on Brooklyn Nine-Nine
- Oscar Scully, on Neighbours

== See also ==
- Sculley (surname)
- Skully (disambiguation), includes those with given name and surname Skully
