= William Scully =

William Scully may refer to:

- William Charles Scully (1855–1943), South African author
- William Scully (Australian politician) (1883–1966), Australian politician and farmer
- William Scully (director) (1889–1949), American filmmaker and director
- William Scully (bishop) (1894–1969), American Roman Catholic bishop of Albany
- William Scully (Irish-American landlord) (1821–1906), wealthy Irish-American land owner in the Corn Belt region

== Fictional characters ==
- William "Bill" Scully, the name of several characters The X-Files related to Dana Scully: her father, brother and son
