= Sculley (surname) =

Sculley is a surname. Notable people with the name include:

- David Sculley, American businessman
- John Sculley (born 1939), American businessman and entrepreneur
- Sheryl Sculley (born 1952), American politician

== See also ==
- Scully (surname)
- Skully (disambiguation), includes people with the surname Skully
