= AGZ =

AGZ may refer to:

- Aggeneys Airport (IATA code), Aggeneys, Northern Cape, South Africa
- Antiquarische Gesellschaft in Zürich (Antiquarian Society of Zürich)
- Mount Iriga Agta language (ISO-639-3 code), a Bikol language spoken in the Philippines
- Volkswagen's 2.3 VR5 110-125 kW engine; see List of discontinued Volkswagen Group petrol engines
- Wagner Municipal Airport, Wagner, South Dakota, US (FAA location identifier AGZ)
