= Geography of South Africa =

- Continent: Africa
- Region: Southern Africa
- Coordinates: 29°00′S 24°00′E
- Area: Ranked 25th
  - Total: 1,220,813 km^{2} (471,359 sq mi)
- Coastline: 2,798 km (1,739 mi)
- Borders: Total land borders: 4,862 km Botswana 1,840 km, Lesotho 909 km, Mozambique 491 km, Namibia 967 km, Eswatini 430 km, Zimbabwe 225 km
- Highest point: Mafadi; 3,450 metres (11,320 ft)
- Lowest point: Sea level 0 m
- Longest river: Orange River; 2,200 kilometres (1,400 mi)
- Largest lake: Lake Chrissie
- Exclusive economic zone: 1,535,538 km^{2} (592,875 mi^{2})

South Africa occupies the southern tip of Africa, its coastline stretching more than 2,850 kilometres (1,770 miles) from the desert border with Namibia on the Atlantic (western) coast southwards around the tip of Africa and then northeast to the border with Mozambique on the Indian (eastern) coast. The low-lying coastal zone is narrow for much of that distance, soon giving way to a mountainous escarpment (Great Escarpment) that separates the coast from the high inland plateau. In some places, notably the province of KwaZulu-Natal in the east, a greater distance separates the coast from the escarpment. Although much of the country is classified as semi-arid, it has considerable variation in climate as well as topography. The total land area is 1,220,813 km^{2} (471,359 mi^{2}). It has the 23rd largest Exclusive Economic Zone of 1,535,538 km^{2} (592,875 mi^{2}).

The South African central plateau contains only two major rivers: the Limpopo (a stretch of which is shared with Zimbabwe), and the Orange (with its tributary, the Vaal) which runs with a variable flow across the central landscape from east to west, emptying into the Atlantic Ocean at the Namibian border.

The eastern and southern coastal regions are drained by numerous shorter rivers. There are very few coastal rivers along the arid west coast north of 31°30′S.

In such a dry country, dams and irrigation are extremely important: the largest dam is the Gariep on the Orange River.

== Topographical divisions ==
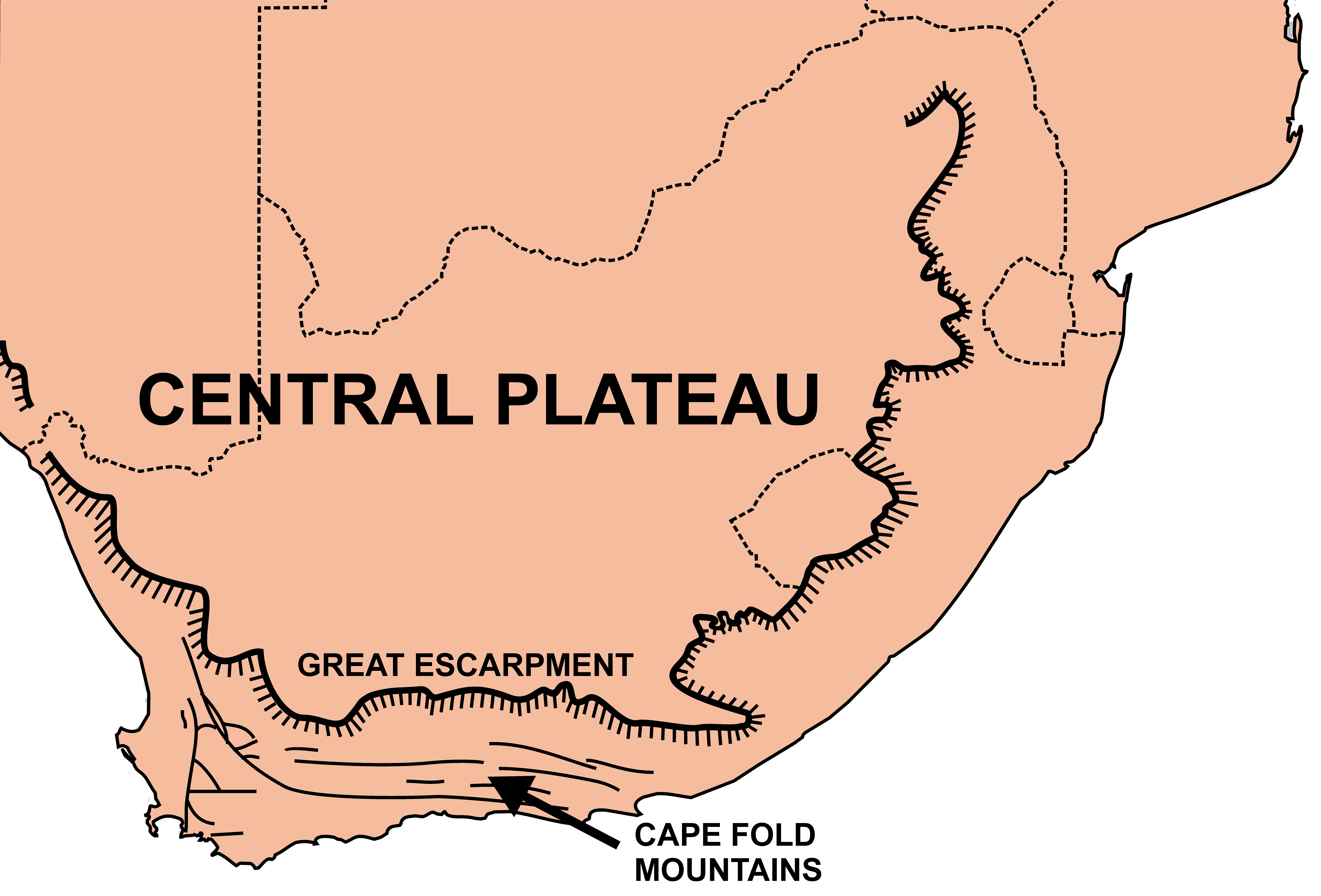
The Southern African Central Plateau edged by the Great Escarpment.

Like much of the African continent south of the Sahara, South Africa's landscape is dominated by a high Central Plateau surrounded by coastal lowlands. This plateau is rimmed by the Great Escarpment which extends northwards to about 10° south of the Equator (i.e. into Angola in the west, and the Muchinga Escarpment in Zambia in the east.)

=== Great Escarpment ===
In South Africa the plateau is at its highest in the east where its edge varies in altitude between 2,000 m and 3,300 m. This edge of the plateau, as the land drops sharply to the coastal plain, forms a very high, steep escarpment known as the Drakensberg Mountains. The southern and western extents of the escarpment are not so high as Drakensberg, but also are known by a wide variety of local names, all termed "mountains" (or "berge" in Afrikaans), in spite of being parts of an escarpment whose top is the central plateau, such as Groenberg Mountain. From the coastal plain the escarpment does, however, look like a range of mountains, hence the names.

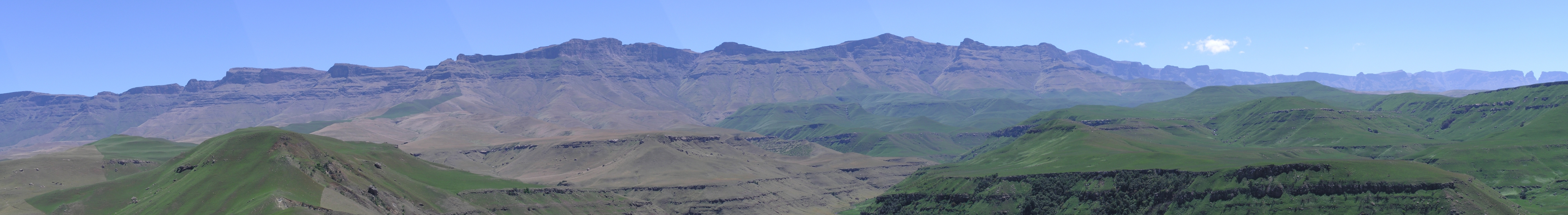
Panorama of the Giant's Castle region of the Drakensberg, the highest section of the Great Escarpment. Here the Escarpment is capped by a 1,400 m layer of erosion-resistant lava, which once covered most of Southern Africa 182 million years ago. Only a small remnant of this lava layer remains on the plateau, covering only part of Lesotho, and accounting for the Great Escarpment's great height on the Lesotho/KwaZulu-Natal border.

The portion of the Great Escarpment that could be designated a "mountain" is where it forms the international border between KwaZulu-Natal and Lesotho. The Lesotho Highlands form a localized high spot on the Central Plateau. This is because it is capped by a 1,400 m thick layer of erosion resistant lava which welled up and spread across most of Southern Africa when it was still part of Gondwana. Most of this lava has eroded away together with a layer of Karoo sedimentary rocks several kilometres thick on top of which the lava was poured out 182 million years ago. Only a small patch of this lava remains and covers much of Lesotho. It has been deeply eroded by the tributaries of the Orange River which drain these highlands towards the south-west (i.e. away from the Escarpment). This gives this high region its very rugged, mountainous appearance.

=== Central plateau ===
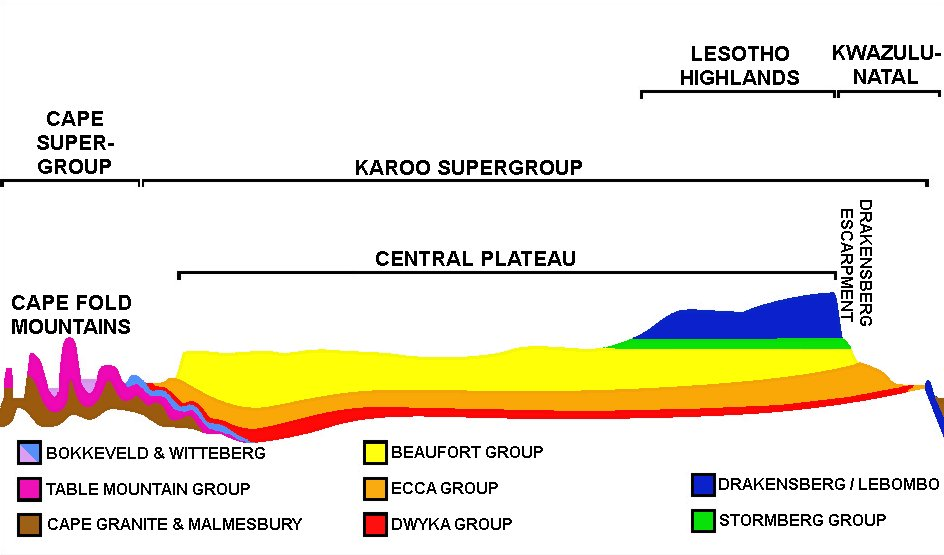
An approximate SW-NE cross section through South Africa with the Cape Peninsula (with Table Mountain) on left, and north-eastern KwaZulu-Natal on the right. Diagrammatic and only roughly to scale. It shows the major geological structures (coloured layers) that dominate the southern and eastern parts of the country, as well as the relationship between the Central Plateau, the Cape Fold Mountains, and the Drakensberg escarpment.

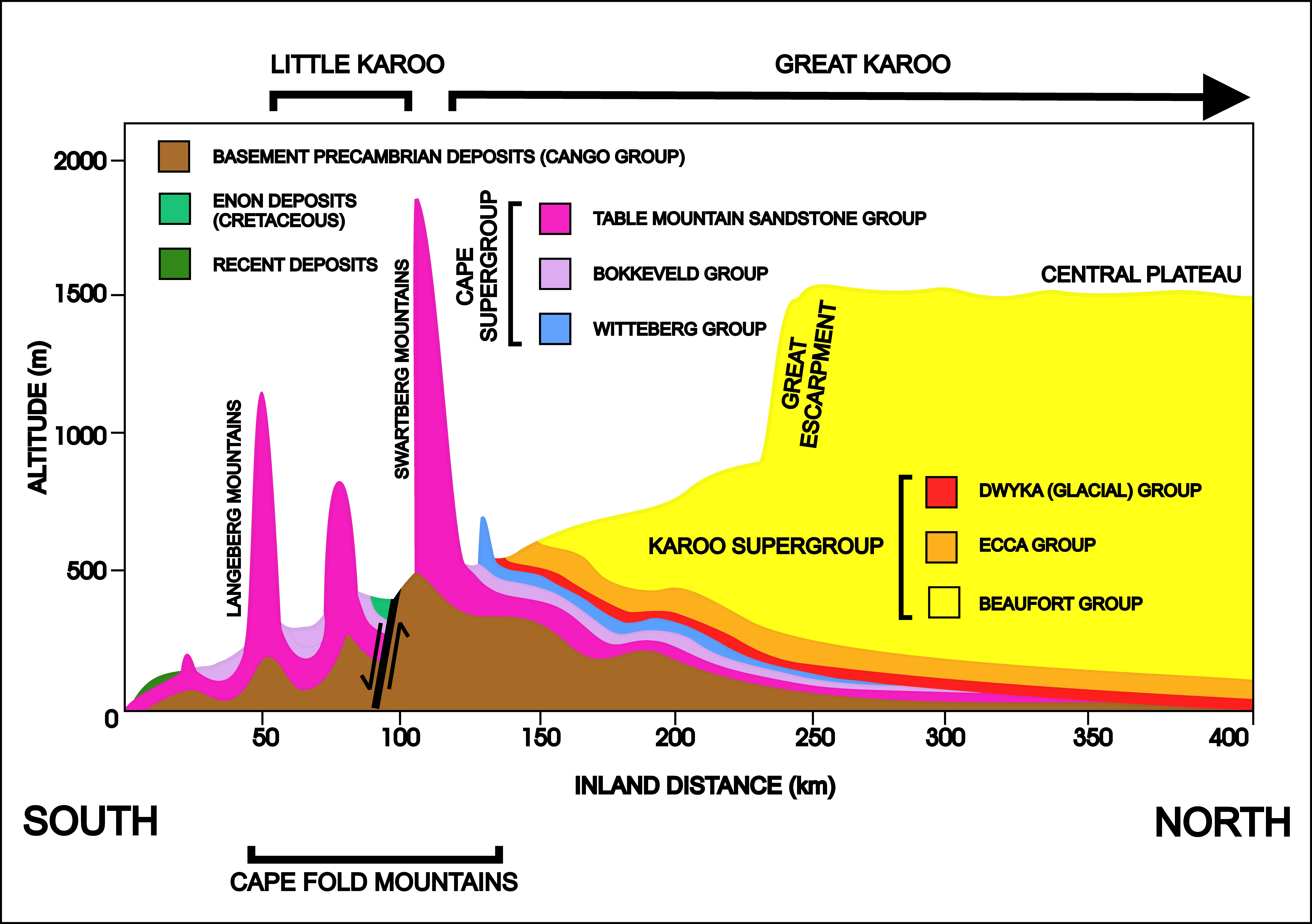
A diagrammatic 400 km north–south cross-section through the southern portion of the country near Calitzdorp in the Little Karoo (approximately 21° 30' E), showing the relationship between the Cape Fold Mountains (and their geological structure) and the geology of the Little and Great Karoo, as well as the position of the Great Escarpment. The colour code for the geological layers is the same as those used in the diagram on the left. The heavy black line flanked by opposing arrows is the fault that runs for nearly 300 km along the southern edge of the Swartberg Mountains. The Swartberg Mountain range owes some of its great height to upliftment along this fault line. The subsurface structures are not to scale.

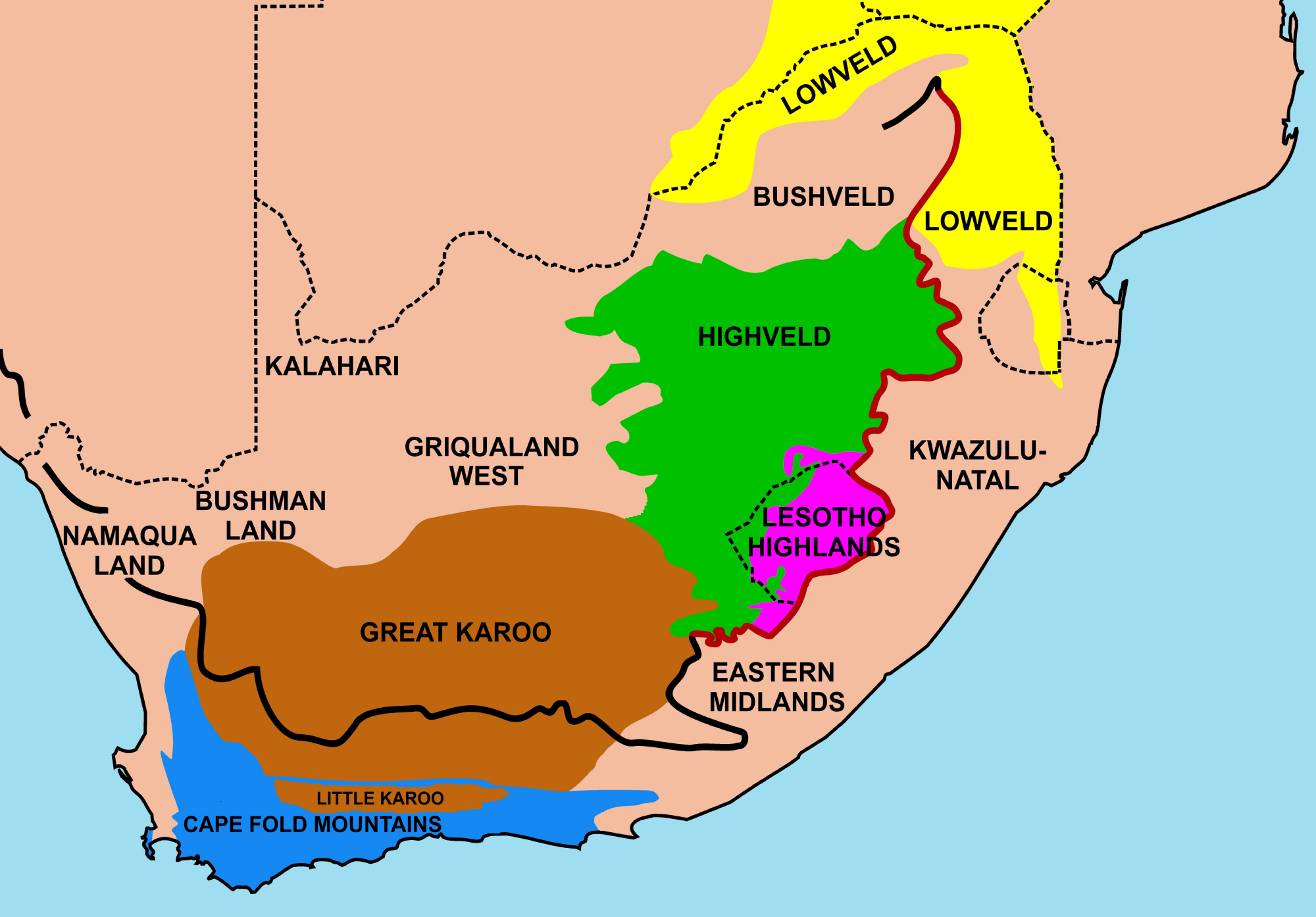
Important geographical regions in South Africa. The thick line traces the course of the Great Escarpment which edges the central plateau. The eastern portion of this line, coloured red, is known as the Drakensberg. The Escarpment rises to its highest point, at over 3,000 m, where the Drakensberg forms the border between KwaZulu-Natal and Lesotho. None of the regions indicated on the map have sharp well-defined borders, except where the Escarpment, or a range of mountains forms a clear dividing line between two regions.

The central plateau (apart from the Lesotho Highlands) forms a largely flat, tilted surface which, as indicated above, is highest in the east, sloping gently downwards to the west (at about 1,000 m above sea level). The downward slope to the south is less pronounced (the southern and south-western edges of the plateau are at about 1600 to 1900 m above sea level). The plateau also slopes downwards, northwards from about the 25° 30' S line of latitude, into a 150‑million-year-old failed rift valley which cuts into the central plateau and locally obliterates the Great Escarpment, forming what is today known as the Limpopo Lowveld at less than 500 m above sea level. The rivers which drain the plateau therefore run west, ultimately, via the Orange River, into the Atlantic Ocean. North of the Witwatersrand, where the land starts to slope down towards the north, the drainage is into the Limpopo River and from there into the Indian Ocean.

=== Coastal plain ===
The coastal plain, which varies in width from about 60 km in the north-west to over 250 km in the north-east, generally slopes gently downwards from the foot of the escarpment to the coast. Numerous relatively small rivers drain the area, being more numerous in the KwaZulu-Natal and Eastern Midlands regions, where they arise on the well watered slopes of the high escarpment, than elsewhere. In the west there are very few such rivers because of the aridity of the region.

=== Cape Fold Mountains ===
In the south and south-west the coastal plain contains a series of mountain ranges that run parallel to the coastline. These are the Cape Fold Mountains, whose rocks were laid down 510 – 350 million years ago, and were then crumpled into a series of parallel folds by the collision of the Falkland Plateau into the south of what was to become Africa when it was part of Gondwana. These series of parallel folds are in the form of an "L", with the western section running north–south, and the eastern section running east–west, for a total length of about 800 km. The right angle of the "L" occurs in the south-western corner of the country, just inland from the Cape Peninsula and Cape Town. These folds lie along the coastline in the south and are not much more than 100 km wide in total along most of their length. In the west they are separated from the coast by a pronounced coastal plain.

The floors of the long valleys between the parallel mountains ranges consist of fertile soils composed of weathered mudstones belonging to the Bokkeveld Group of the Cape Supergroup, as opposed to the nutrient-poor, sandy soils on the quartzitic sandstone mountains, on either side of the valleys. However, the rainfall is, in general, low, bordering on the semiarid (or frankly semiarid in, for instance, the Little Karoo). Agriculture, which includes viniculture and fruit-growing, therefore depends on irrigation from rivers with sources in the mountains, which are frequently covered in snow during winter. The Little Karoo is known for its ostrich farming. Since the late 1800s this was centered on their feathers, but has developed to include leather and their lean meat.

The Cape Fold Mountains are separated from the Great Escarpment by an approximately 100–150 km wide plain known as the Lower Karoo (not to be confused with the "Little Karoo") at an altitude of about 600–800 m above sea level. Geologically and geographically the Cape Fold Mountains and the Great Escarpment are quite different and independent entities.

=== Coastline ===
South Africa's coastline is remarkably smooth, with very few natural harbours. The reason is that Southern Africa has been continuously uplifted for the past 180 million years, and especially so during the past 20 million years. The present coastline was therefore once part of the underwater continental shelf, which contains very few deep ravines or gorges. In contrast, a subsiding coastline, like Norway's, tends to become deeply indented where the sea has flooded old river gorges and glacial valleys.

== Regional divisions ==
=== Highveld ===
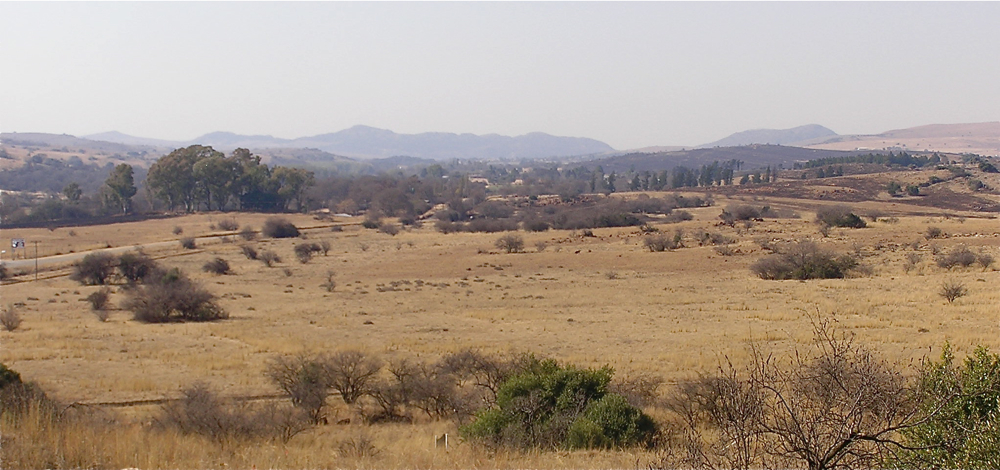
Highveld in winter in Gauteng Province north of Johannesburg. The hills in the background are the Magaliesberg, which are generally regarded as the local northern boundary of the Highveld, with the Bushveld beyond.

The Central Plateau is divided into several distinctly different regions (though with very vague boundaries), largely as a result of the rainfall distribution across South Africa: wet in the east and increasingly drier and more arid in the west. The wettest and most fertile portion of the Central Plate is the Highveld, which occupies the central eastern portion of the Plateau. It is generally between 1,500 – 2,100 m above sea level, highest on the edge of the Escarpment to the east (the Mpumalanga Drakensberg), and sloping downwards to the south and west. Its southern boundary is often taken to be the Orange River, from where the continuation of the plateau is known as the Great Karoo, except for a small strip just south of Lesotho which is often included in the Highveld. To the west the Highveld fades into the dry savannah of Griqualand West, beyond which lies the Kalahari desert. This boundary is very vague. The Highveld therefore encompasses the entire Free State, and an adjoining strip of the Provinces to the north of it. It receives between 400 and 1200 mm of rain annually, and is largely a flat grassland plain. Much of the area is devoted to commercial farming, but it also contains South Africa's largest conurbation in Gauteng Province, the centre of the gold mining industry. But there are also important coal mines on the Highveld which are associated with South Africa's major electricity generating power stations.

The land is generally flat or gently undulating. Only a few rocky ridges protrude from this flatness: the Vredefort Dome, the Witwatersrand Ridge and the Magaliesberg just north of Pretoria, from where the Highveld gives way to the Bushveld to the north.

=== Lowveld ===
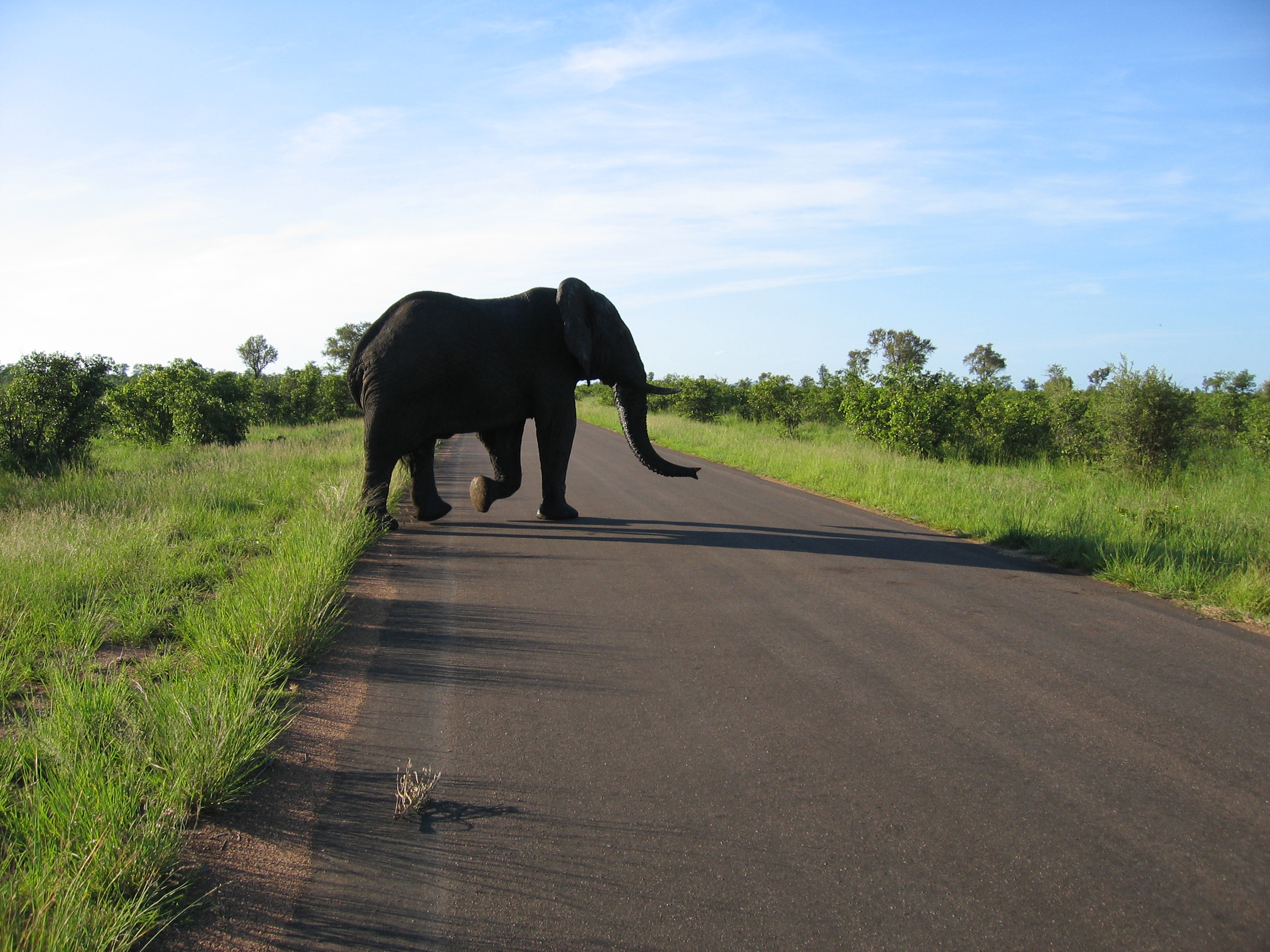
An elephant in the Kruger National Park in the Lowveld

The South African portion of the coastal strip between the Limpopo and Mpumalanga Drakensberg and the ocean, together with the Limpopo River valley, is called the Lowveld. These lowlands, below about 500 m (1,640 ft) altitude, form South Africa's northern border with Botswana and Zimbabwe, where a 180‑million-year-old failed rift valley cuts into Southern Africa's central plateau and locally obliterates the Great Escarpment. The Limpopo and Save rivers run from the central African highlands via the Lowveld into the Indian Ocean to the east. The Limpopo Lowveld extends southwards, east of the Drakensberg escarpment through Mpumalanga Province and ultimately into eastern Eswatini. This southern limb of the Lowveld is bounded by South Africa's border with Mozambique to the east, and the north-eastern part of the Drakensberg to the west. This region is generally hotter and less intensely cultivated than the Highveld.

The Lowveld used to be known as "fever country" because malaria, carried by mosquitoes, was endemic to almost the entire area. Before the middle of the 20th century, the Lowveld was also home to the tsetse fly, which transmits sleeping sickness to humans and nagana to animals, especially the horses of the travelers trying to reach the Highveld and Witwatersrand Gold Fields from Maputo.

The Lowveld is known for its high concentration of big game, including the larger animals, like African elephants, rhino, African buffalo, the big cats (lions, leopards, and cheetahs), the plains zebra, and a wide variety of antelope, while the slow-flowing streams and wetlands of the Lowveld are a haven for the hippos and crocodiles. The bird life is also astoundingly abundant and varied. This wildlife is particularly concentrated in the Kruger National Park located in the eastern Lowveld areas of Mpumalanga and Limpopo Provinces, along almost the entire border with Mozambique. But many private game farms and game reserves can also be found elsewhere in the Lowveld.

=== Bushveld ===
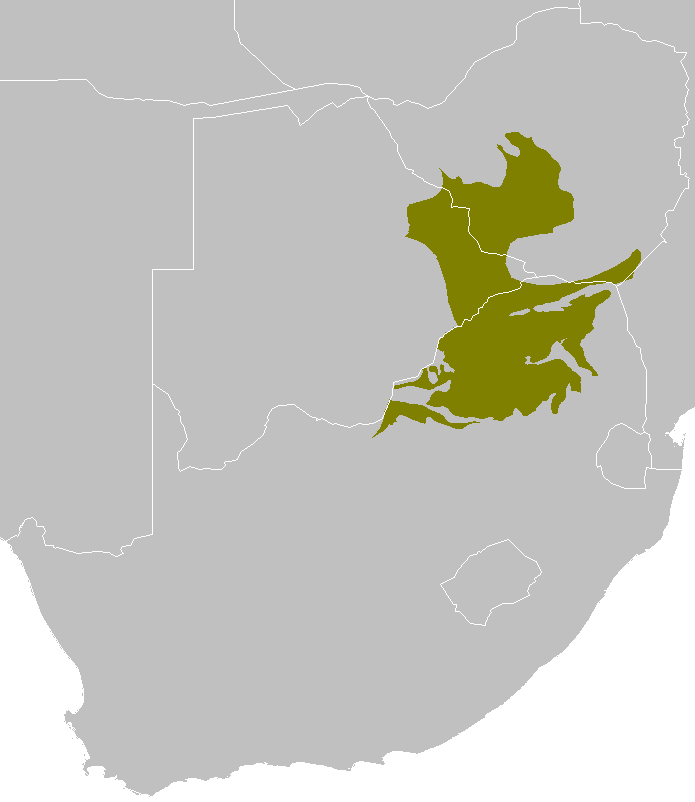
A map of the Bushveld biome in northeastern South Africa. Being defined botanically, it includes much of the Lowveld, and is therefore more extensive than the geographical region generally termed the Bushveld.

The Lowveld partly overlaps with a dry savanna ecoregion known as the Bushveld, a basin characterized by open grasslands with scattered trees and bushes. Elevation varies between 600 metres and about 900 metres above sea level. The Bushveld is one of the largest and best known layered igneous mineral complexes in the world. Covering an area roughly 350 kilometres by 150 kilometres, the Bushveld has extensive deposits of platinum and chromium and significant reserves of copper, fluorspar, gold, nickel, and iron.

The northern edge of the Bushveld, where the plains rise to a series of high plateaus and low mountain ranges, form the southern edge of the Lowveld and the Limpopo River Valley in Northern Province. These mountains include the Waterberg, and the Soutpansberg Range. The Soutpansberg Range reaches an elevation of 1,700 meters before dropping off into the Limpopo River Valley and the border between South Africa and Zimbabwe. West of the Bushveld, Highveld, and Lowveld is the southern basin of the Kalahari Desert, which borders Namibia and Botswana at an elevation of 600 meters to 900 meters.

=== Karoo ===
The western section of South Africa on the inland side of the Cape Fold Mountains is dominated by the Great Karoo, a semi-desert region that is divided by the Great Escarpment into the Upper Karoo (at an elevation of 1,100–1,600 m) and the Lower Karoo (at an elevation of 600–800 m). Separated from the Great Karoo by the Swartberg mountain range is the Little Karoo.

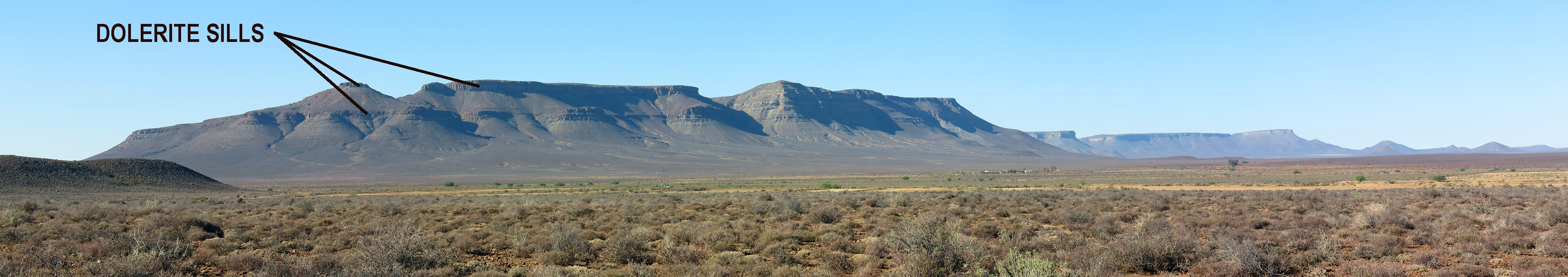
Flat topped hills (called Karoo Koppies) are highly characteristic of the southern and southwestern Great Karoo landscape (especially on the Central Plateau). These hills are capped by hard, erosion resistant dolerite sills. This is solidified lava that was forced under high pressure between the horizontal strata of the sedimentary rocks that make up most of the Karoo's geology. This occurred about 182 million years ago, when huge volumes of lava were extruded over most of Southern Africa and adjoining regions of Gondwana, both on the surface and deep below the surface between the sedimentary strata. The resultant bulging of what later became Southern Africa heralded the break-up of Gondwana. Since this massive extrusion of lava, Southern Africa has undergone a prolonged period of erosion exposing the older softer rocks, except where they were protected by a cap of dolerite. This photograph was taken in the western region of the Upper Karoo near Calvinia. Note the general flatness of the arid plains between the koppies.

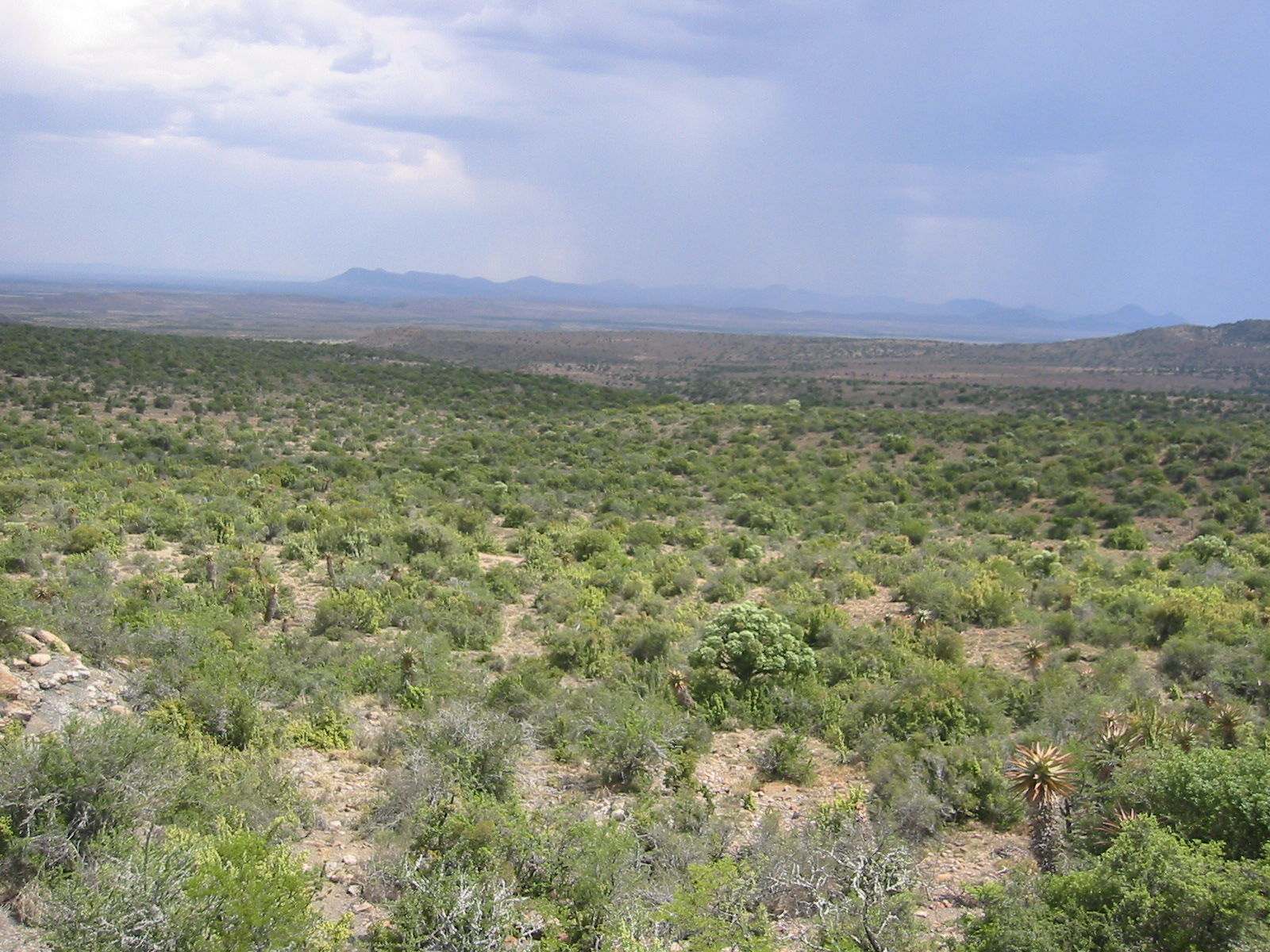
Karoo landscape, showing the shrubland that characterizes most of the Karoo. The mountain range in the far distance is the Nuweberg section of the Great Escarpment. The view is from the Lower Karoo looking northwards.

In the southwest, running parallel to the coastline, the mountains of the Cape Fold Belt form a series of ranges that run in the form of an "L" by a series running north–south, and another set running east–west, with the junction between the two at the Cape Peninsula. The north–south ranges, paralleling the Atlantic coastline, include the Cederberg and the Groot Winterhoek and have peaks close to 2,000 metres high. The east–west ranges, paralleling the southern coastline, include the Swartberg and the Langeberg with peaks exceeding 2,200 metres. The mountains of the Cape Fold Belt form the southern and western boundaries of the Great Karoo. The other boundaries of the Great Karoo are arbitrary and ill-defined. To the north the Karoo grades into even more arid Bushmanland. To the north-east, the Orange River is often regarded as the boundary between Karoo and the Highveld. To the east the Karoo fades into the grasslands of the Eastern Midlands.

The town of Sutherland is located in the Roggeveld region of the Upper Karoo, with midwinter temperatures as low as −15 °C, and is thought to be the coldest inhabited place in South Africa.

The Little Karoo is separated from the Great Karoo by the Swartberg mountain range. It lies in a 290 km long, narrow (40–60 km wide) valley in of the Cape Fold Mountains, with the Swartberg range to the north and the Langeberg-Outeniqua range to the south. It is as arid as the Great Karoo, except along the foothills of the Swartberg, which are well-watered by streams that cascade down the mountains. The Little Karoo is the centre of the Ostrich farming industry, especially around the town of Oudtshoorn.

=== KwaZulu-Natal ===
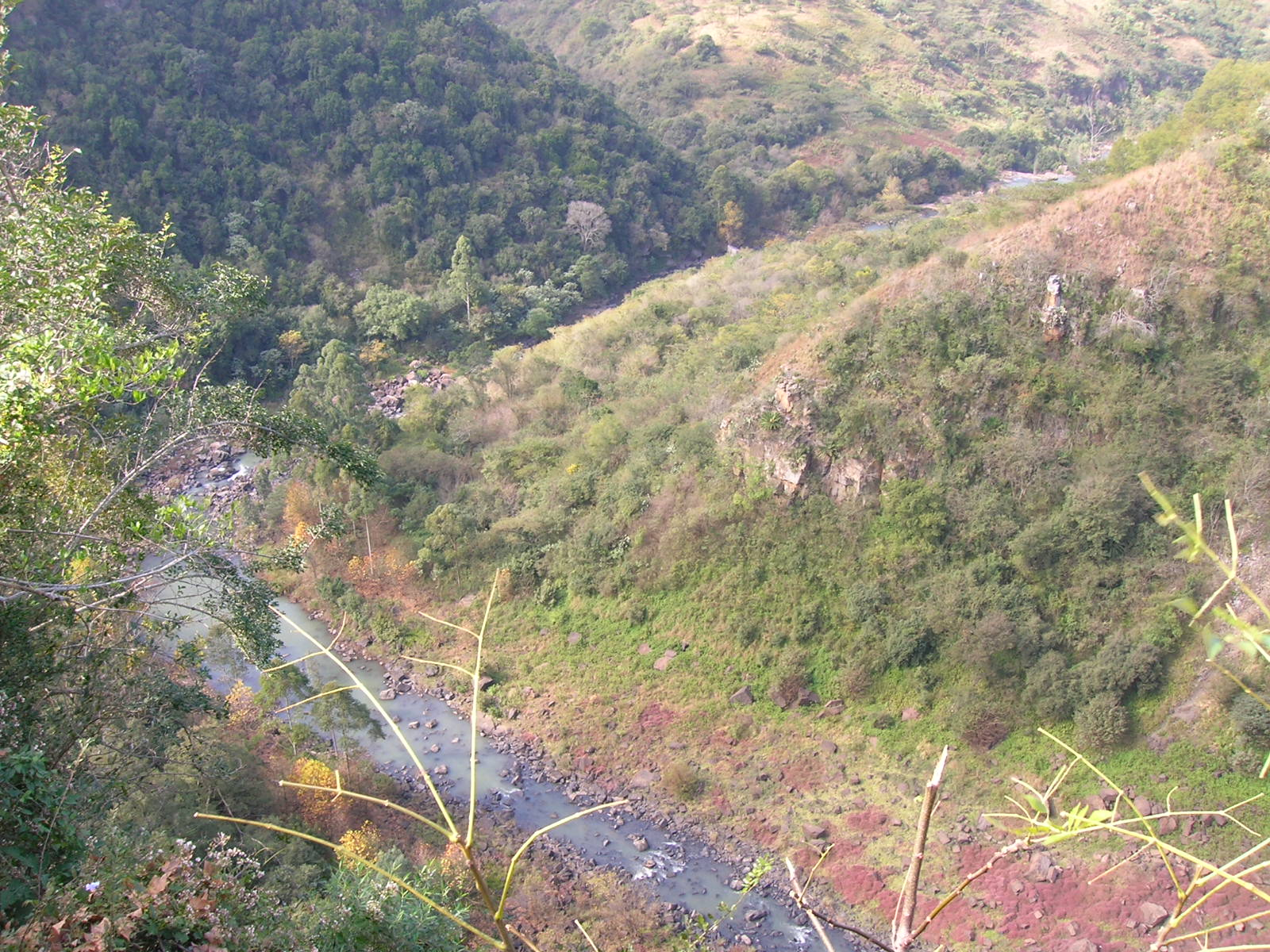
A view of the Mngeni River valley near Howick Falls.

KwaZulu-Natal is a South African Province that lies entirely below the Great Escarpment, which forms its western and south-western boundaries. It therefore constitutes part of the South African "Coastal Belt", which is, over much of this region, more than 220 km wide. The region can be subdivided into three distinct geographic areas. The lowland region along the Indian Ocean coast is extremely narrow in the south, widening in the northern part of the province, while the central Natal Midlands consist of an undulating hilly, 1,000 m high plateau, rising to 1,500 m towards the west, at the foot of the Great Escarpment. The Great Escarpment, known here as the Drakensberg, together with the Lebombo Mountains in the north form the mountainous regions of the province.

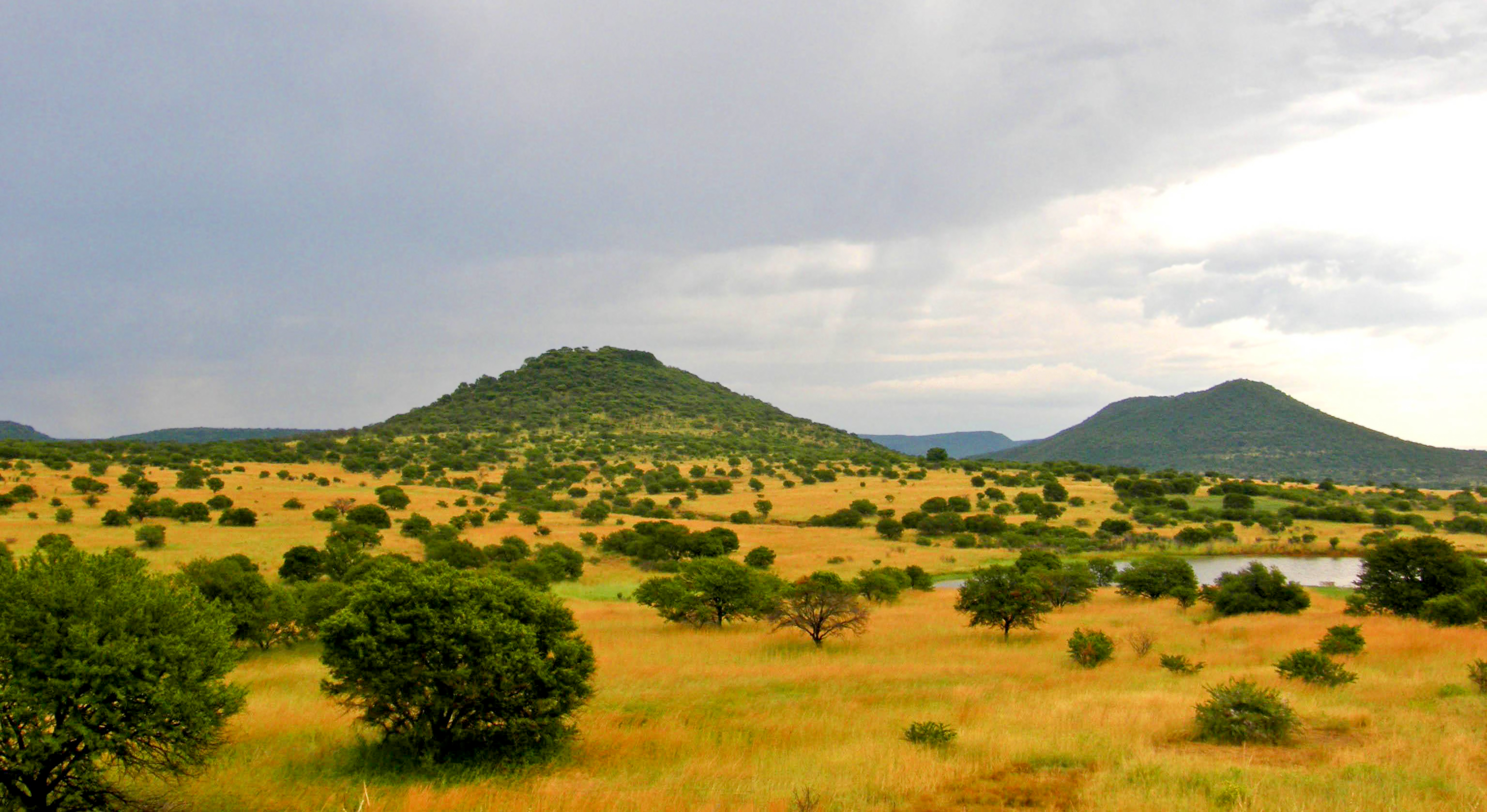
Upland savannah near Pietermaritzburg.

The coastal regions are typically covered with subtropical thickets, while the deeper ravines and steep slopes of the river valleys host Afromontane Forest. The midlands are covered in moist grasslands with isolated pockets of Afromontane Forest. The north consists, in the main, of moist savanna habitat, whilst the Drakensberg region hosts mostly alpine grassland.

Most of the KwaZulu-Natal Drakensberg are at an altitude of 2,000 m, but where they form the border with Lesotho they rise to over 3,000 m. The Lebombo mountains are a long narrow range, not much higher than 700 m, that runs along Mozambique's border with South Africa and Eswatini. From Eswatini the range continues south-eastwards for about 40 km into KwaZulu-Natal.

A great number of rivers arise in the Drakensberg. These have cut fairly deep valleys, and occasionally gorges, into the KwaZulu-Natal landscape giving the province a very hilly appearance. The Valley of a Thousand Hills, between Durban and Pietermaritzburg, is particularly spectacular. The largest of the rivers is the Tugela, portion of whose waters are pumped over the escarpment on to the Highveld to supplement the water supply to the large industrial cities of Gauteng.

The province contains rich areas of biodiversity of a range of flora and fauna. The iSimangaliso Wetland Park and the uKhahlamba Drakensberg Park have been declared UNESCO World Heritage Sites. The iSimangaliso Wetland Park, along with uKhahlamba Drakensberg Park and Ndumo, are wetlands of international importance for migratory species, and are designated as Ramsar sites. South Africa signed the 1971 Ramsar Convention to try to conserve and protect important wetlands because of their importance to habitats and numerous species.

San Lameer Resort

The region has a varied yet verdant climate thanks to its diverse, complex topography. Generally, the coast is subtropical with inland regions becoming progressively cooler in winter, but hotter in summer (except on the Escarpment). Durban on the coast has an average annual rainfall of 1010 mm. The average midday temperature during summer (January–March) is 28 °C, with the minimum temperatures in the early morning averaging 21 °C. In winter (June–August) the average maximum temperature is 23 °C, and the minimum is 11 °C. The summer temperatures in Pietermaritzburg are similar to those in Durban, but it is considerably cooler in winter. The temperature in Ladysmith, further inland, in the Tugela River Valley, reaches 30 °C in the summer, but may drop below freezing point on winter evenings. The Drakensberg can experience heavy winter snow, with light snow occasionally experienced on the highest peaks in summer. The Zululand coastal region, in the north of the province, has a tropical climate with high humidities, supporting many sugar cane farms.

Beaches of KwaZulu-Natal are of world-class quality. The warm coastal climate means that visitors are attracted to them all year round. Some of the visitors, however, come for the annual late-autumn or early-winter "sardine run" along the KwaZulu-Natal coastline, south of Durban. Referred to as "the greatest shoal on earth", the sardine run occurs when millions of sardines migrate from their spawning grounds south of the southern tip of Africa northward along the Eastern Cape coastline toward KwaZulu-Natal. They follow a route close inshore, often resulting in many fish washing up on beaches. The huge shoal of tiny fish can stretch for many kilometres; it is preyed upon by thousands of predators, including game fish, sharks, dolphins, and seabirds. Usually the shoals break up and the fish disappear into deeper water around Durban. Scientists have been unable to answer many questions surrounding this exceptional seasonal event.

=== Bushmanland ===
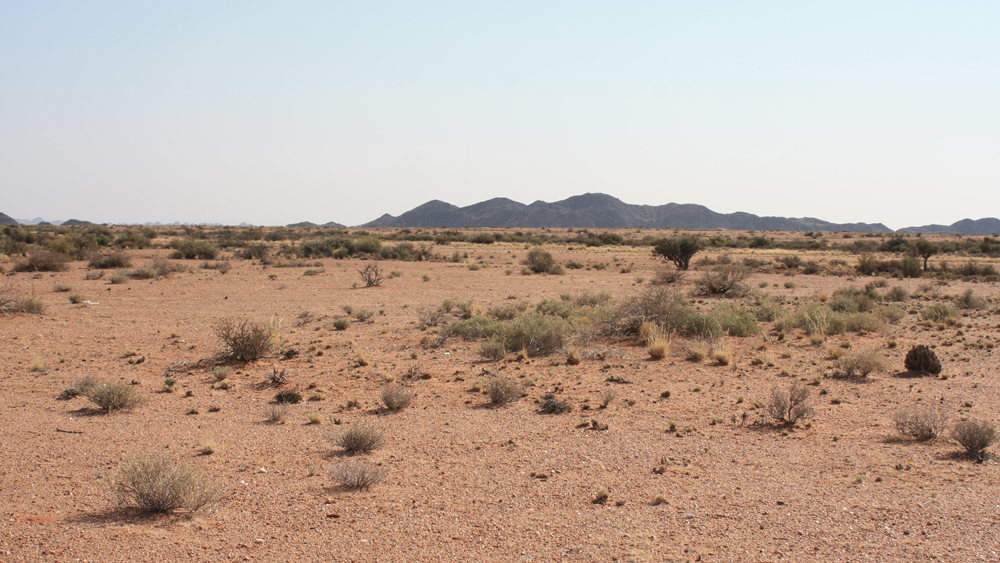
Typical Bushmanland landscape, emphasising its aridity and overall peneplain flatness. The hills in the background are formed by dolerite-like, erosion-resistant intrusions or dykes of unknown, but probably very ancient, age which have partially withstood the erosion of the rest of Bushmanland over the past 150 million ago.

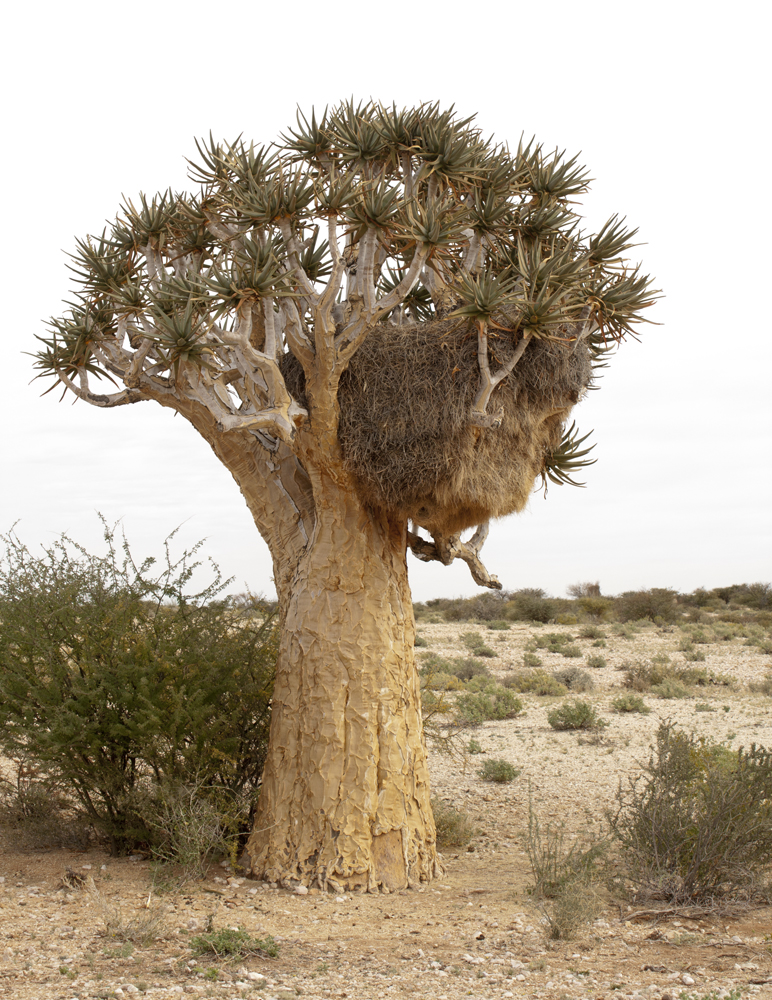
A sociable weavers' (Philetairus socius) nest in a quiver tree (or kokerboom) (Aloe dichotoma). Quiver trees only occur in Bushmanland, and neighbouring Namaqualand, and Southern Namibia, usually widely scattered across the arid landscape, but occasionally in dense enough stands to qualify as quiver tree "forests", for instance on the outskirts of Kenhardt. Sociable weaver nests are highly characteristic of Bushmanland, but usually on the telephone poles along the roads. In the absence of telephone poles in the treeless plains of Bushmanland quiver trees are favourite nesting sites for sociable weavers.

Bushmanland is an arid area inland from Namaqualand (see below). Its northern boundary is the Orange River beyond which lies Namibia. In the south it grades into the north-western part of the Great Karoo. To the west lies Griqualand West. It is probably the most inhospitable area in South Africa, because of its aridity, infertile soil and highly saline groundwater. Together with the Kalahari Desert to the north-east, its rainfall is the most highly variable (in percentage deviation from the annual average), and its temperature range the greatest (difference between the average temperature in January and in July) in South Africa. Its wildlife however, both fauna and flora, though sparse, is full of interest. Although the veld is too arid to bloom like that of the West Coast of Namaqualand, even when there is some spring rain, what does appear is highly unusual and often hauntingly beautiful.

A highly productive base metal mine on the Aggeneys Farm close to the N14 highway between Upington and Springbok exploits an ore rich in zinc, lead, copper, and silver since 1977. Close by, to the east, is Ghaamsberg which has very large zinc deposits, but the ore is low-grade and, therefore, at present, unprofitable to large scale mining.

Vaalputs, a nuclear waste repository, has been sited between Bushmanland and the north-west of the Great Karoo, and acts as a de facto nature reserve.

=== Namaqualand ===
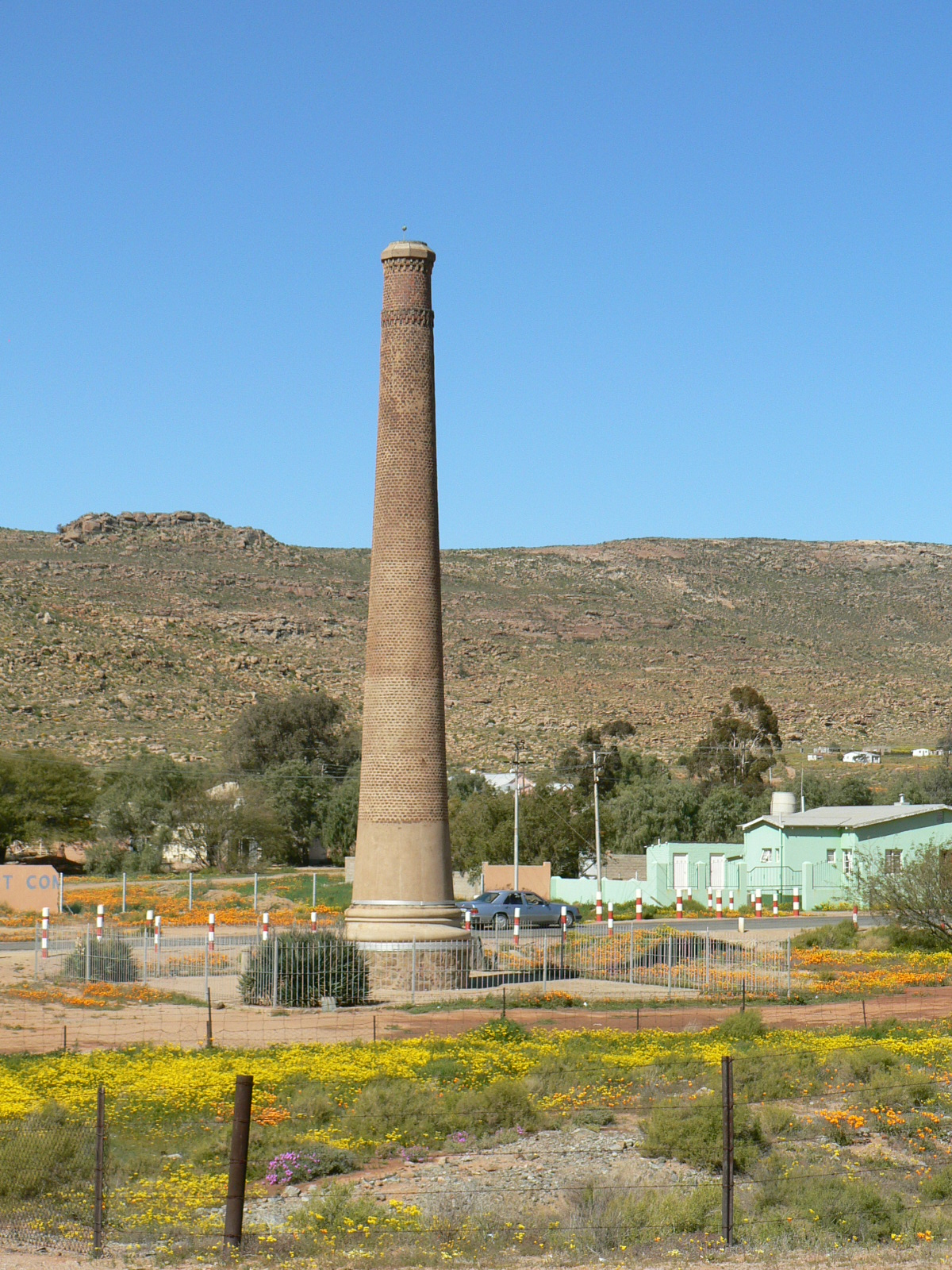
Ventilation shaft erected by the Cape Copper Mining Company in 1880 in Okiep

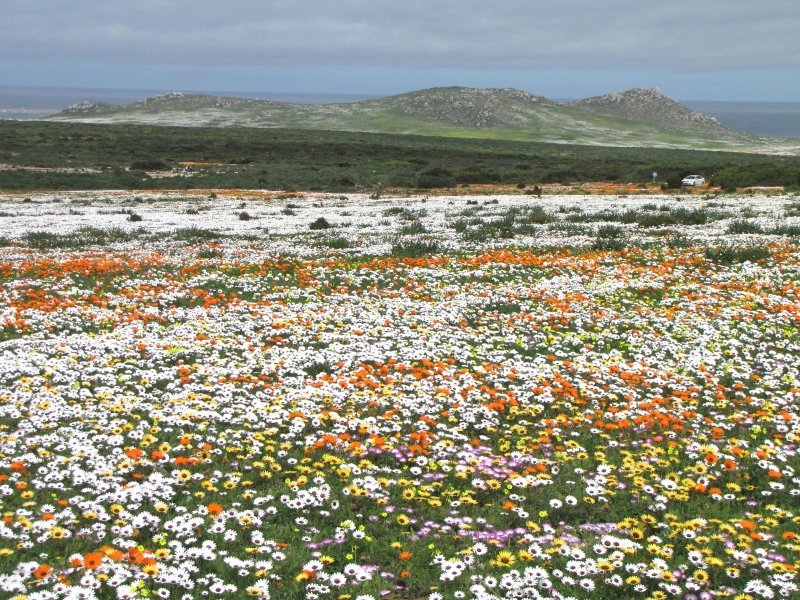
Spring flowers in Namaqualand

This is the arid region along the north-western coastline (northwards from approximately the 31°S line of latitude) of South Africa, partly above and partly below the Great Escarpment. The region extends into Namibia, north of the Orange River, where it is known as "Great Namaqualand", or "Namaland". The South African portion of Namaqualand is known as "Little Namaqualand", and falls within the Northern Cape Province. The region is sparsely populated, mainly by Afrikaans speaking people of Nama, and Khoikhoi descent. The original Nama and Khoikhoi languages are spoken in only a few remote areas. The main economic activities are mining, and fishing along the coast.

Some of the more prominent towns in this area are Springbok, being the capital of this region, as well as Kleinzee and Koiingnaas, both private mining towns owned by De Beers Diamond Mines. This area is rich in alluvial diamonds, deposited along the coast by the Orange River. Oranjemund is another mining town along this coast, situated in Namibia, but very much on the border. As the name suggests, it is at the mouth of the Orange River which forms the border between South Africa and Namibia. The town of Alexander Bay is located on the opposite side of the river mouth (i.e. in South Africa) and is linked to Oranjemund by the Ernest Oppenheimer Bridge. Other links crossing the river further upstream are a reintroduced pontoon at Sendelingsdrift in the Richtersveld National Park, and road bridges at Vioolsdrif (the main border crossing between the two countries) and at the remote border crossing of Onseepkans.

A vibrant fishing industry is found along this stretch of the South African west coast, especially in Port Nolloth, which is also a major resort town for people living in the interior of South Africa (e.g. Gauteng), and Hondeklipbaai, (or Dogstonebay), so called because of a large boulder outside the town which, when viewed correctly, looks vaguely like a dog sitting down.

The copper bangles worn by the Khoikhoi aroused the interests of the Dutch officials of the Dutch settlement established by Jan van Riebeeck in the Cape in 1652. Several expeditions were consequently mounted to find the source of this copper. A mineshaft was dug in the "Copper Mountains" in northern Namaqualand in 1685, which still can be seen near the disused Carolusberg mine a few kilometers east of Springbok. However commercial mining was only started in 1859, and over the next 140 years vast quantities of ore have been extracted from 23 mines in the area. Springbok and its surrounding towns (Nababeep and Okiep) were the center of this mining activity. But, in the early 2000s the last mine was closed. However, about 115 km further inland, in Bushmanland (see above), a large new mine is extracting copper, lead, zinc, and silver from the "Black Mountain" (originally "Swartberg") deposits at Aggeneys since 1977. High grade granite is mined in several places (e.g. near Kamieskroon, and Concordia) in this granite-rich landscape.

Namaqualand is popular with both local and international tourists during early springtime (August - September), when for a short period this normally arid area becomes covered with a kaleidoscope of colour during the flowering season. This is known throughout South Africa as the Namaqualand daisy season, when orange and white daisies, as well as hundreds of other flowering species, spring up from a previously barren landscape. A part of Little Namaqualand, known as the Richtersveld, is a national park and a World Heritage Site, while the often-visited Namaqua National Park and the Goegap Nature Reserve are located short distances from Kamieskroon and Springbok, respectively.

=== Surrounding oceans ===
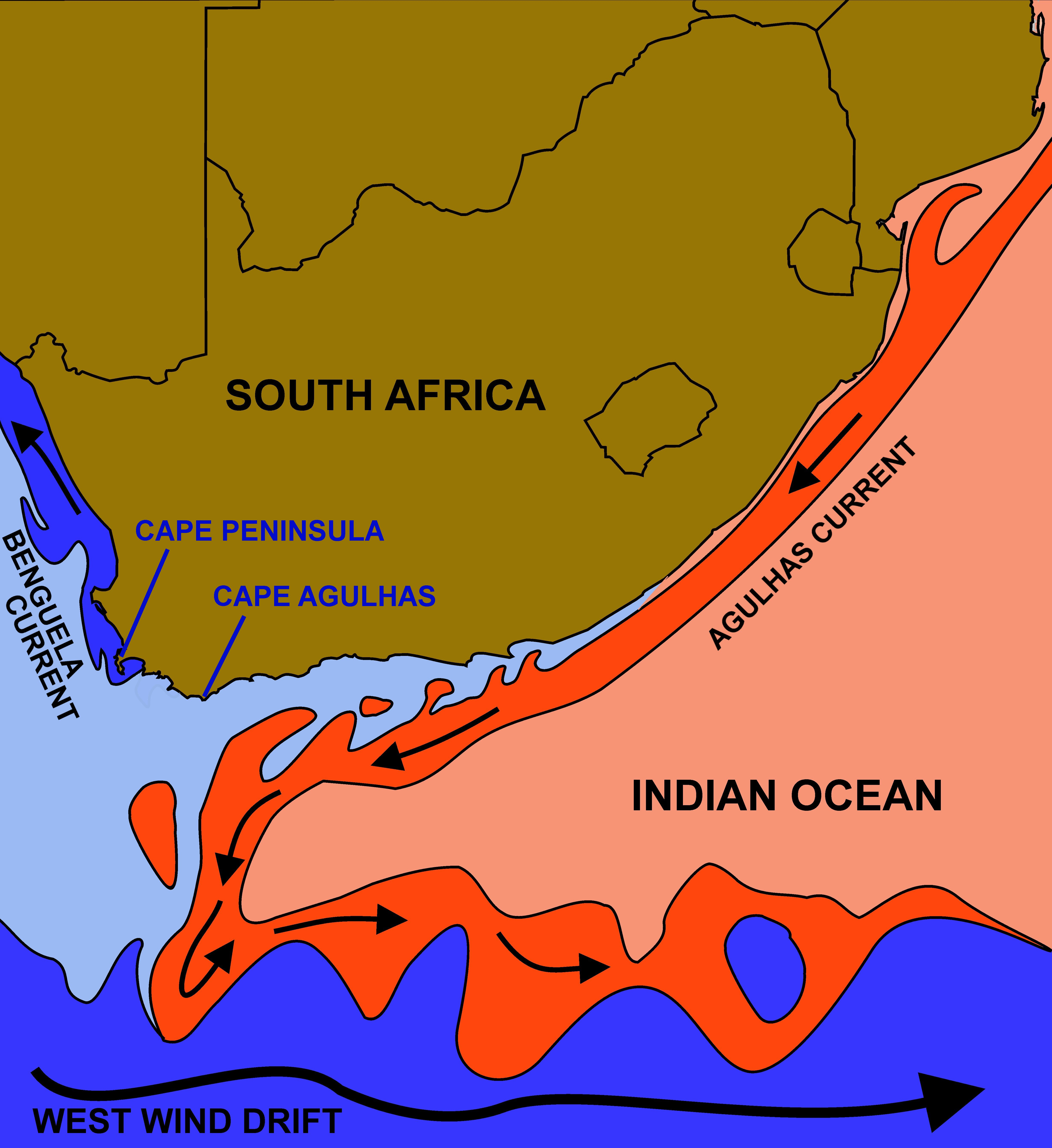
The courses of the warm Agulhas current (red) along the east coast of South Africa, and the cold Benguela current (blue) along the west coast. Note that the Benguela current does not originate from Antarctic waters in the South Atlantic Ocean, but from upwelling of water from the cold depths of the Atlantic Ocean against the west coast of the continent. The two currents do not "meet" anywhere along the south coast of Africa.

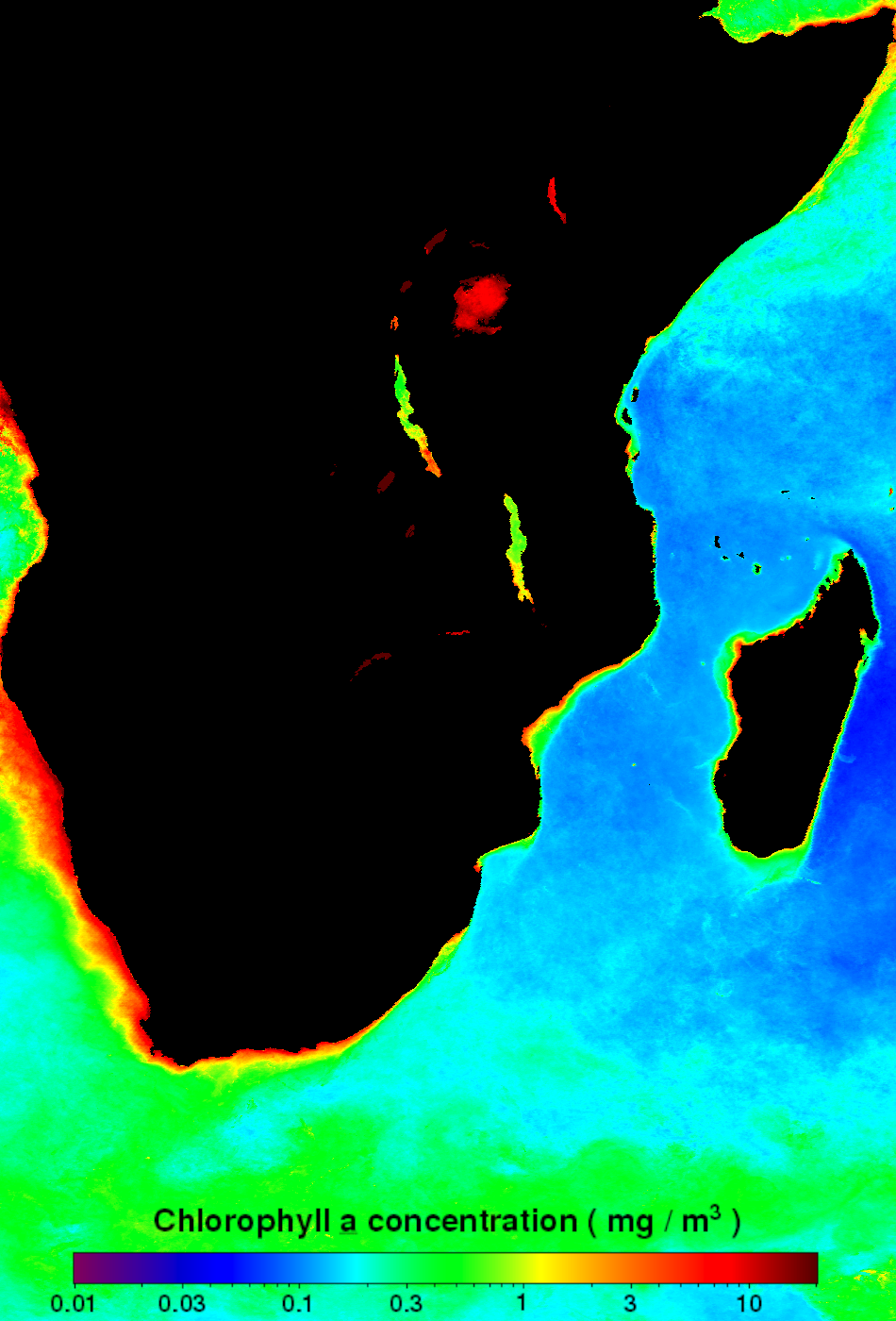
The chlorophyll concentration (or plankton density) in the oceans surrounding Southern Africa. Note the very high plankton density (the red colour) in the cold waters off the western coast. The temperature of the water and its fertility is due to its upwelling, along the coast.

The vast majority of South Africa's border consists of the ocean—or two oceans, which, according to the International Hydrographic Organization, officially meet at Cape Agulhas, the most southern point of Africa. Its territory includes Marion and Prince Edward Islands, nearly 2,000 km (1,243 mi) south of Cape Town in the sub-antarctic Indian Ocean.

The cold Benguela current is a mineral-rich upwelling current, which flows away to the north along the western coastline, after having come up from the cold depths of the Atlantic Ocean. Plankton grow in these fertile waters, and support large numbers of fish, and therefore a prosperous (in the past) fishing industry. Over-fishing has, however, reduced the importance of this fishing industry both for the local as well as the country's economy. The east coast has the north-to-south Mozambique/Agulhas Current, which provides warm waters. These two currents have a major effect on the country's climate, the ready evaporation of the eastern seas providing generous rainfall while the Benguela current retains its moisture to cause desert conditions in the west.

Several small rivers run into the sea along the coastline, but none is navigable and none provides useful natural harbours. The coastline itself, being fairly smooth, provides only one good natural harbour at Saldanha Bay north of Cape Town. A lack of fresh water, however, prevented permanent settlement here until relatively recently. The Bay of Natal looks, on the map, like a good natural harbour, but, in its natural state, it was dry at low tide. Nevertheless, busy harbours now exist at Cape Town, Port Elizabeth, East London, Durban in the Bay of Natal, and Richards Bay. Saldanha Bay is today an important harbour at the end of the Sishen–Saldanha railway line for the export of Iron ore from the interior.

== Climate ==
South Africa map of Köppen climate classification zones

Average temperatures in °C
City	Summer	Winter
Cape Town	20.1	12.6
Durban	23.8	17
Johannesburg	19.2	11.1
Pretoria	22.2	12.9

South Africa is largely a dry country, with most of its western regions being semi-desert. The rainfall increases in the east, (the Highveld, KwaZulu-Natal, and the Eastern Midlands), and falls primarily in summer. The narrow southern coastal strip receives all-year rainfall in the east (the Garden Route), and winter rainfall in the west (on the Cape Peninsula and its surrounds). The summers are warm to hot, while the winter temperatures can vary, depending on locality from bitterly cold to cool. Thus the Karoo, which occupies a large part of the western Central Plateau, has a climate which is extremely hot in summer and bitterly cold in winter. In contrast, the eastern coastline on the Indian Ocean is lush, well watered and warmed by the Mozambique Current; patches of Southern Africa mangroves grow along this coast.

The southern coast, part of which is known as the Garden Route, is temperate and green. The Cape Peninsula and surrounds have a Mediterranean climate, with cool, wet winters and warm, dry summers (becoming hotter in interior valleys). Snow commonly falls in winter on the higher ground of the Cape Fold Mountains, during winter. The Cape Peninsula has a reputation for its wind: the dry "South-Easter" which blows almost incessantly in summer (December–February), and the "North-Wester" which accompanies the cold fronts that roll in from the Atlantic during winter (June–August). The vegetation of the Cape area consists of fynbos, some grassland and Albany thickets.

The eastern section of the Karoo does not extend as far north as the western part, giving way to the flat landscape of the Free State, which – though still semi-arid – receives somewhat more rain. North of the Vaal River the Highveld is better watered, with an annual rainfall of 760 mm (29.9 in) and a high altitude (around 1,750 m (5,741 ft)) which mitigates the extremes of heat of an inland area at this latitude. Winters are cold, though snow is rare.

Further north and to the east, especially where a drop in altitude beyond the escarpment gives the Lowveld its name, the temperature rises. The Tropic of Capricorn slices through the extreme north. Here one finds the typical South African Bushveld.

There is skiing in winter in the high mountainous regions: the Drakensberg mountains that form the eastern escarpment along the KwaZulu-Natal/Lesotho border, and on the Hex River Mountains of the Cape Fold Belt, but the coldest place in the country is Sutherland in the western Roggeveld region of the Upper Karoo, with minimum midwinter temperatures as low as −15 °C. The deep interior provides the hottest temperatures: in 1948 the mercury hit 51.7 °C (125.06 °F) in the Northern Cape Kalahari near Upington.

== Climate change ==
Climate change in South Africa is expected to bring considerable warming and drying to much of this already semi-arid region, with greater frequency and intensity of extreme weather events such as heatwaves, flooding and drought. According to computer generated climate modelling produced by the South African National Biodiversity Institute parts of southern Africa will see an increase in temperature by about one degree Celsius along the coast to more than four degrees Celsius in the already hot hinterland such as the Northern Cape in late spring and summertime by 2050. The Cape Floral Kingdom, identified as one of the global biodiversity hotspots, is predicted to be hit very hard by climate change. Drought, increased intensity and frequency of fire and climbing temperatures are expected to push many rare species towards extinction.

Multiple entities are working to combat the effects of degradation and drought. In the Port Elizabeth region, national NGO Living Lands had in cooperation with an agricultural insurance company, planted 3.7 million trees as of late 2015, in order to restore the water catchment system and halt erosion.

== Environmental issues ==
South Africa has lost a large area of natural habitat in the last four decades, primarily due to overpopulation, sprawling development patterns and deforestation during the 19th century. South Africa is one of the worst affected countries in the world when it comes to invasion by alien species with many (e.g. black wattle, Port Jackson willow, Hakea, Lantana and Jacaranda) posing a significant threat to the native biodiversity and the already scarce water resources. The original temperate forest found by the first European settlers was exploited ruthlessly until only small patches remained. Currently, South African hardwood trees like real yellowwood (Podocarpus latifolius), stinkwood (Ocotea bullata), and South African black ironwood (Olea laurifolia) are under government protection. Statistics from the South African Environmental Affairs department show a record 1215 rhinos were killed in 2014.

=== Tree cover extent and loss ===
Global Forest Watch publishes annual estimates of tree cover loss and 2000 tree cover extent derived from time-series analysis of Landsat satellite imagery in the Global Forest Change dataset. In this framework, tree cover refers to vegetation taller than 5 m (including natural forests and tree plantations), and tree cover loss is defined as the complete removal of tree cover canopy for a given year, regardless of cause.

For South Africa, country statistics report cumulative tree cover loss of 1,640,152 ha (16,401.52 km^{2}) from 2001 to 2024 (about 27.4% of its 2000 tree cover area). For tree cover density greater than 30%, country statistics report a 2000 tree cover extent of 5,983,121 ha (59,831.21 km^{2}). The charts and table below display this data. In simple terms, the annual loss number is the area where tree cover disappeared in that year, and the extent number shows what remains of the 2000 tree cover baseline after subtracting cumulative loss. Forest regrowth is not included in the dataset.

Annual tree cover loss in South Africa, 2001–2024. View chart definition.
Tree cover extent in 2000 minus cumulative tree cover loss in South Africa, 2001–2024 (loss-only residual; does not account for gain). View chart definition.

Annual tree cover extent and loss
Year	Tree cover extent (km2) (Note: This residual measure does not include forest regrowth.)	Annual tree cover loss (km2)
2001	59,054.75	776.46
2002	58,577.94	476.81
2003	57,652.21	925.73
2004	56,926.20	726.01
2005	55,879.67	1,046.53
2006	54,830.23	1,049.44
2007	54,359.17	471.06
2008	53,545.42	813.75
2009	52,872.63	672.79
2010	52,255.05	617.58
2011	51,558.88	696.17
2012	50,709.92	848.96
2013	50,146.24	563.68
2014	49,449.57	696.67
2015	48,748.00	701.57
2016	48,012.53	735.47
2017	47,071.99	940.54
2018	46,435.32	636.67
2019	45,673.91	761.41
2020	45,051.45	622.46
2021	44,530.77	520.68
2022	44,120.97	409.80
2023	43,825.26	295.71
2024	43,429.69	395.57

== Extreme points ==
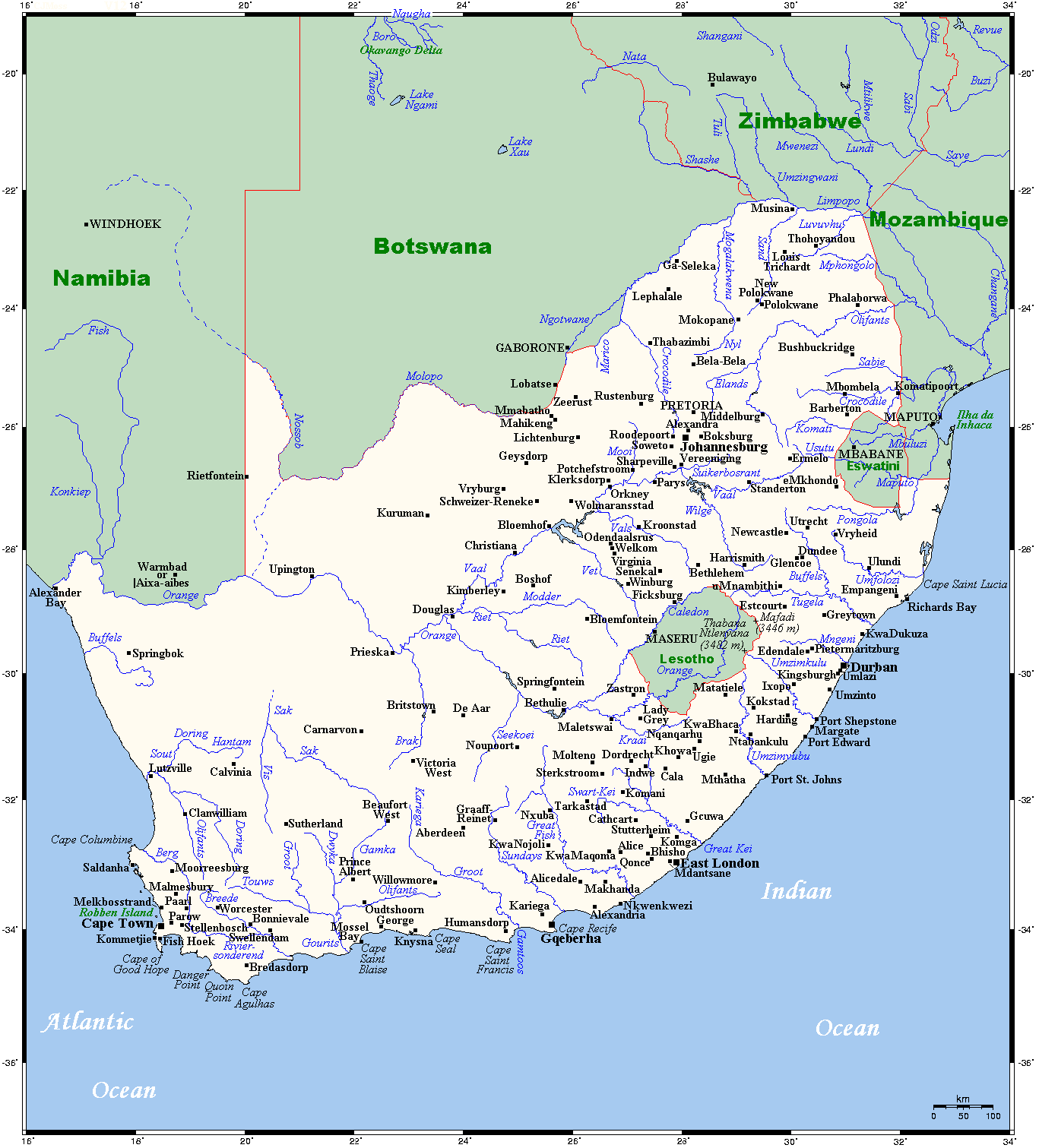
South Africa's cities and main towns

This is a list of the extreme points of South Africa, the points that are farther north, south, east or west than any other location in the country.

Including the Prince Edward Islands

- Northernmost Point: Over Vlakte farm, Vhembe District Municipality, Limpopo Province (22°7′40″S 29°39′20″E)
- Southernmost Point: Marion Island, Prince Edward Islands (46°58′55″S 37°49′45″E)
- Westernmost Point: Orange River Mouth (near Alexander Bay), Northern Cape (28°37′50″S 16°27′0″E)
- Easternmost Point: Prince Edward Island, Prince Edward Islands (46°38′25″S 38°0′5″E)

South African mainland

- Northernmost Point: Over Vlakte farm, Limpopo Province
- Southernmost Point: Cape Agulhas, Western Cape (34°50′0″S 20°0′0″E)
- Westernmost Point: Orange River Mouth, Northern Cape
- Easternmost Point: beach below Monte Ouro (near Kosi Bay), KwaZulu-Natal (26°51′30″S 32°53′30″E)
- South-Westernmost Point: Cape of Good Hope, Western Cape (34.833235°S 19.998571°E)
- South Easternmost Point: Eastern Cape (32°34′20″S 28°33′4″E)

== See also ==
- List of vegetation types of South Africa
- Provinces of South Africa
- Districts of South Africa
- Municipalities of South Africa
- List of mountains in South Africa
- List of rivers of South Africa
- Summary of South Africa's Geography
