= Scully =

Scully may refer to:

- Scully (surname)
- Scully (TV series), British television drama
- Scully Recording Instruments, recording equipment company

== See also ==
- Leon Sculy Logothetides (1853–1912), Romanian politician and surgeon
- Skully (disambiguation)
