= Ghaamsberg =

- Location within South Africa

Highest point
- Elevation: 1,148 m (3,766 ft)
- Listing: List of mountains in South Africa
- Coordinates: 29°14′45″S 18°58′7″E

Geography
- Location: Northern Cape

Ghaamsberg is a mountain in South Africa. situated just east of Aggeneys, in the Namakwa District Municipality of the Northern Cape province, 33 km to the south of the border with Namibia. Its summit is 1148 metres above sea level.

It is noted for its biological diversity. The unique ecologies on the various inselbergs, peaks, hills and plains in the vicinity, having varied rocky and shallow soil substrates, support a wide diversity of plants, animals, birds and insects, including rare and endemic species, a number of them threatened. The writer William Charles Scully wrote that, “for sheer uncompromising aridity, for stark grotesque naked horror, these mountains stand probably unsurpassed on the face of the globe.”

This mountain should not be confused with Gamsberg, a mountain in Namibia.

== Gamsberg Mine ==
In 2006, there were proposals for an open-cast zinc mine on its summit.

In 2011, the Vedanta Resources bought the undeveloped mine from Anglo American.

The first blast off of Phase 1 was in July 2015, with an access ramp being completed in April 2017.

In November 2017, Vedanta Zinc International (VZI) announce a collaboration with General Electric and mining software developer MineRP. The initial stage of this collaboration will be part of the "Smart Ore Movement" launch at the Gamsberg mine.

The mine was officially opened on Thursday 28 February 2019 by South African President Cyril Ramaphosa.

=== Gamsberg Mine Landslide ===
On 17 November 2020, a mining-related "geotechnical incident" caused a landslide and 10 miners to become trapped; with mining halted, eight miners were rescued, one died and one body was missing. On 18 January 2021, a press release stated mining operations had resumed.
