= Corn Belt =

Agricultural or cultural region of the Midwestern United States

Coordinates: 41°N 90°W

- Agricultural or cultural region of the United States
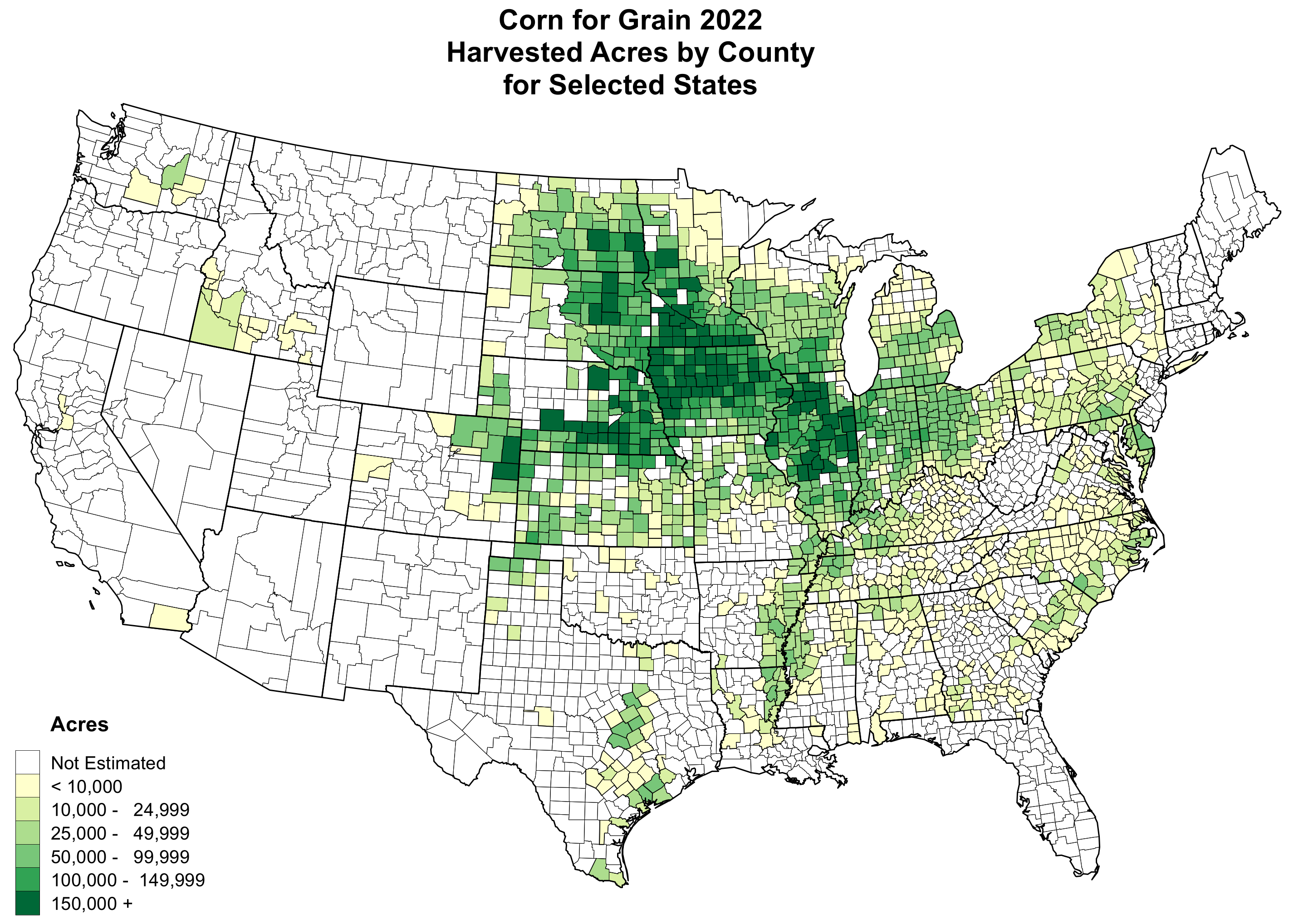
- 2022 production of corn in the United States
- Country: United States
- States: Illinois; Indiana; Iowa; Kansas; Kentucky; Michigan; Minnesota; Missouri; Nebraska; North Dakota; Ohio; South Dakota; Wisconsin

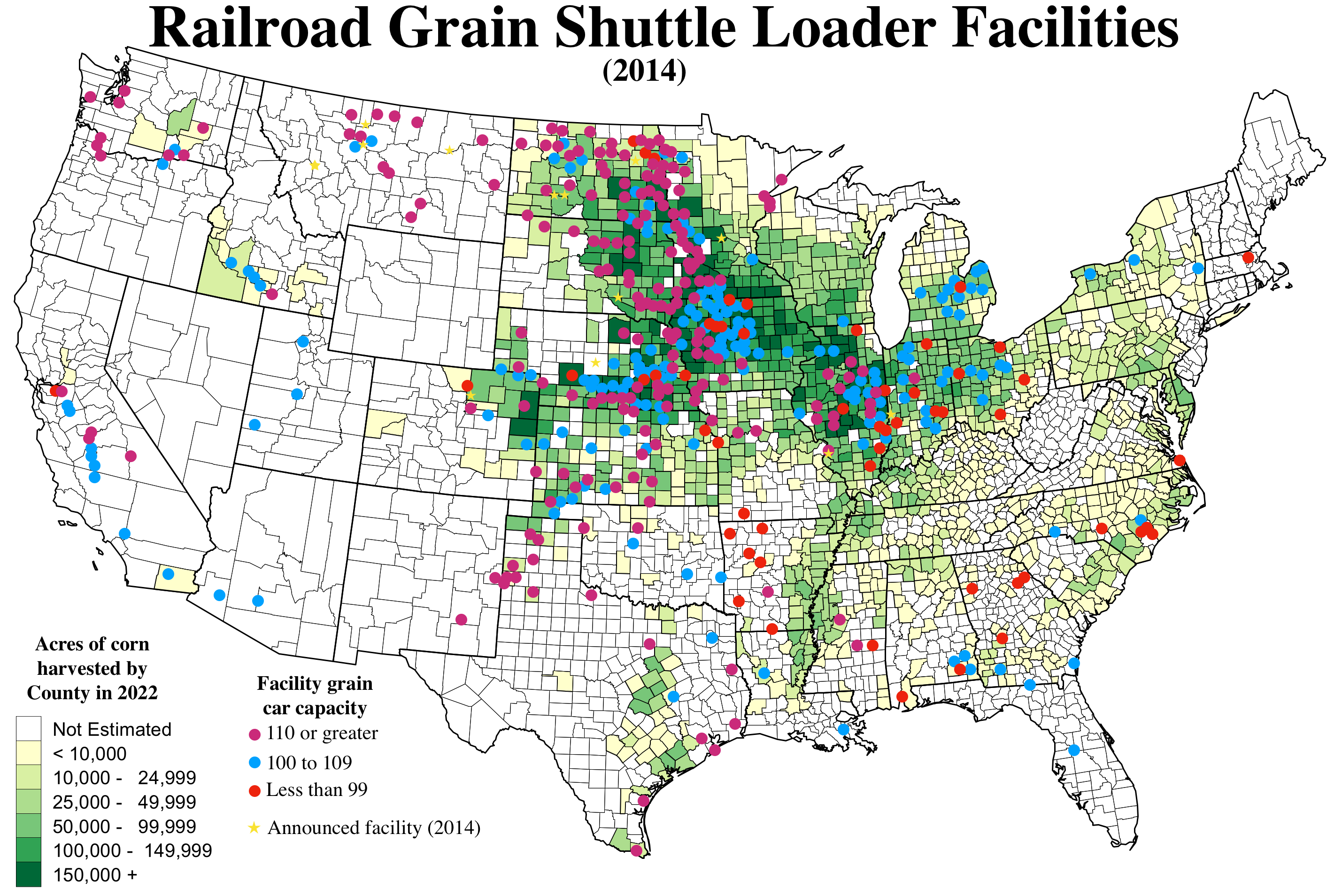
Railroad grain elevator facilities (2014) 110 or greater grain car 100 to 109 Less than 99 Announced facility (2014)

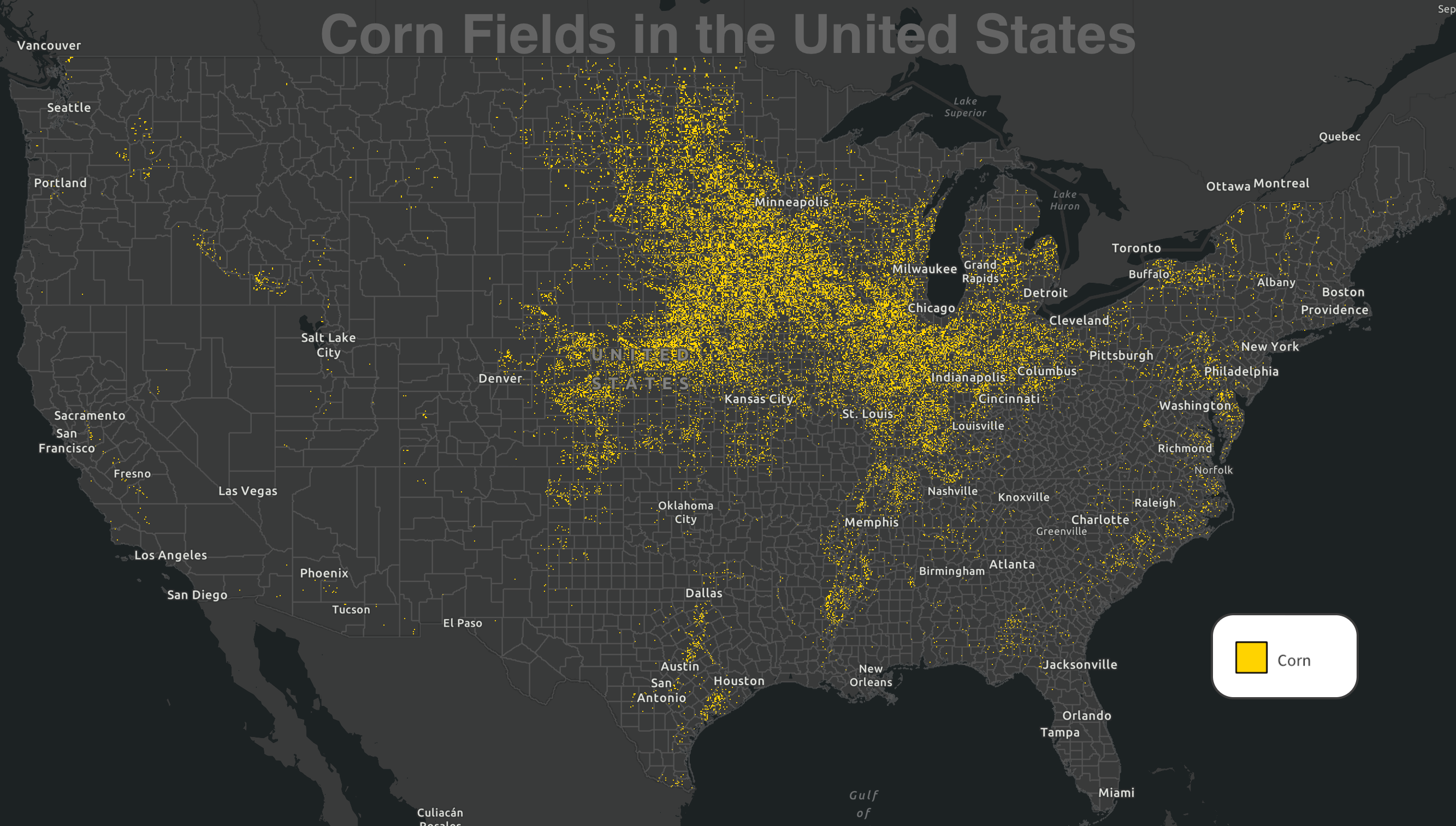
Corn fields in the United States

The Corn Belt is a region of the Midwestern United States and part of the Southern United States that, since the 1850s, has dominated corn production in the United States. In North America, corn is the common word for maize. More generally, the concept of the Corn Belt connotes the area of the Midwest dominated by farming and agriculture, though it stretches down into the South as well reaching into Kentucky.

== Geography ==
There is lack of consensus regarding the constituents of the Corn Belt, although it often includes Iowa, Illinois, Indiana, southern Michigan, western Ohio, eastern Nebraska, eastern Kansas, southern Minnesota, and parts of Missouri. It also sometimes includes South Dakota, North Dakota, all of Ohio, Wisconsin, all of Michigan, and Kentucky.

The region is characterized by level land and deep fertile soils with high concentrations of organic material and nitrogen.

As of 2008, the top four corn-producing states were Iowa, Illinois, Nebraska, and Minnesota, accounting for more than half of the corn growth in the U.S.

More recently, the Corn Belt was mapped at the county level using the Land use and Agricultural Management Practices web-Service (LAMPS), along with animated maps of changes in time (2010–2016).

== History ==
William Scully (1821–1906), from a wealthy landowning Catholic family in West Tipperary, Ireland, immigrated to Chicago in 1851. He bought up hundreds of thousands of acres of prime Corn Belt farmland in the Midwest, and rented it to tenants. By 1906 he owned 225,000 acres in Illinois, Kansas, Nebraska, and Missouri, renting it out to 1200 tenants.

On account of new agricultural technology developments between 1860 and 1970, the Corn Belt went from producing mixed crops and livestock into becoming an area focused strictly on wheat-cash planting. After 1970, increased crop and meat production required an export outlet, but global recession and a strong dollar reduced exports and created serious problems even for the best farm managers.

In 1956, former Vice President Henry A. Wallace, a pioneer of hybrid seed, declared that the Corn Belt had developed the "most productive agricultural civilization the world has ever seen".

Most corn grown today is fed to livestock, especially hogs and poultry. In recent decades, soybeans have grown in importance.

By 1950, 99% of corn has been grown from hybrids.

== EPA ecoregion ==
In 1997, the USEPA published its report on the United States' ecoregions, in part based on "land use". Its "Level III" region classification contains three contiguous "Corn Belt" regions, Western (47), Central (54), and Eastern (55), stretching from Indiana to eastern Nebraska.

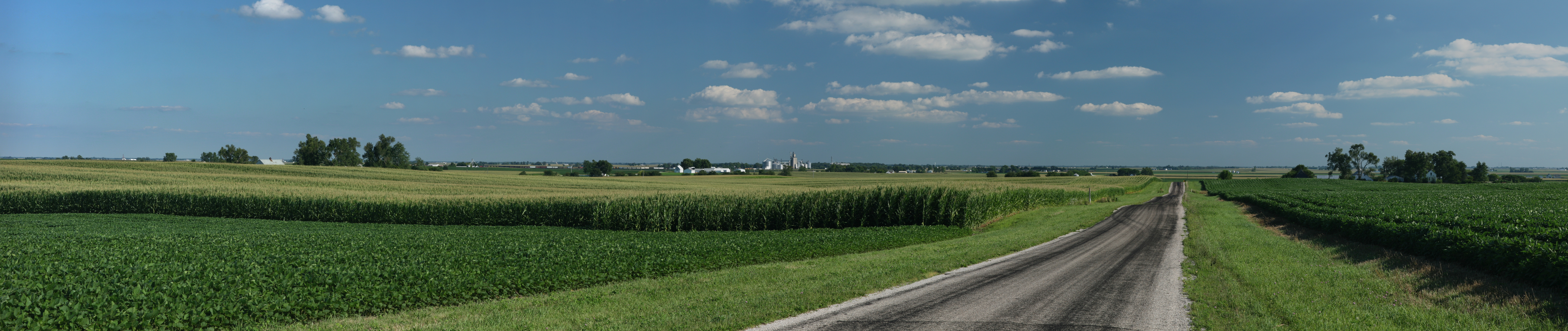
Corn fields near Royal, Illinois

== See also ==
- Breadbasket
- Canadian Prairies, Canada's 'Breadbasket'
- Central Black Earth Region, segment of the Eurasian chernozem belt that lies within Central Russia
- Grain elevator
- Palliser's Triangle, Canada's semi-arid grain production region
- Peak wheat
- William Scully (Irish-American landlord), by 1900 the largest landowner in the Corn Belt and the USA
