= Marcus Weller =

American entrepreneur

Marcus Weller (born July 14, 1984), is an American entrepreneur and inventor of the Skully motorcycle helmet.

== Career ==
Weller attended Wayne State University and studied psychology. A motorcycle accident inspired him to found Skully in 2013. Marcus now holds a Ph.D. in Industrial Psychology.

== Skully Helmet ==
Weller invented the Skully AR-1. The AR-1 was to be the first vertically integrated, smart, Heads-Up Display (HUD) helmet for consumers. The HUD system displays at a virtual distance of 10 feet (3.0 m) in front of the rider. The AR-1 was to feature a near 180-degree rear-view camera, turn-by-turn GPS navigation, smartphone pairing and voice control. Weller also served as Skully CEO until July 2016, and the company shut down later the same month.

Weller with his brother and co-founder, Mitch Weller, were sued by Isabelle Faithauer, a former executive assistant, for fraudulently using Skully's corporate funds for personal use. The lawsuit was later dropped.

Since 2014 Marcus has spent more than a decade advancing U.S. interests as a Science Diplomat for the Humboldt Foundation, author and speaker on AI and foreign policy, adviser on AI and Data Policy for ATARC, and Senior Commercialization Adviser to DARPA.

In 2025 Dr Marcus Weller and his brother Mitch Weller formed Deepinvent.ai Deepinvent.ai is the creator of the first AI Innovator capable of inventing and advancing intellectual property in any industry.
