= Johannes Hendricus Meiring Beck =

The Honourable Johannes Hendricus Meiring Beck FRSE

Minister of Communications, Telecommunications and Postal Services of South Africa
- In office 1915–1919
- Prime Minister: Louis Botha
- Preceded by: Watt, T.
- Succeeded by: Orr, T.

Personal details
- Born: 28 November 1855 Worcester
- Died: 15 May 1919 (aged 63) Cape Town
- Party: South African Party
- Spouse: Emily Mary Kuys
- Children: 3
- Profession: Physician, politician

Sir Johannes Hendricus Meiring Beck, FRSE (28 November 1855, Worcester - 15 May 1919, Cape Town) was a Cape and later South African physician and politician. He was a member of the Cape Colony delegation to the National Convention between 1908 and 1909, which led to the creation of the Union of South Africa, and held various memberships of medical-professional and scholarly bodies in South Africa and the British realm. He was an early occupier of the office of the Minister of Posts and Telegraphs in South Africa.

Beck was knighted in 1911 for his participation in the National Convention.

== Personal life and education ==
Beck was born in Worcester in the Cape Colony to Cornelius Beck, an auctioneer and general agent, and Johanna Elisabeth Meiring on 28 November 1855. He attend school at the South African College and went on to study at the University of the Cape of Good Hope, where he graduated in 1874.

He studied medicine in Edinburgh, Scotland, and graduated with first-class honours with a Bachelor of Medicine and a Master in Surgery. In 1880, he was admitted as a member of the Royal College of Physicians of Edinburgh and appointed as a house surgeon and physician at the Royal Infirmary of Edinburgh for 2 years. During this time, Beck also studied at hospitals in Berlin and Vienna.

He was awarded a Doctor of Medicine in absentia by the University of Edinburgh in 1890, and became a member of the Royal Society of Edinburgh the next year.

Beck married Emily Mary Kuys in 1885. The couple had 3 daughters.

He died in Cape Town on 15 May 1919, at the age of 63.

== Medical practice ==
Beck was licensed to practice medicine in the Cape Colony in April 1881, practicing first in Kimberley and then in his hometown of Worcester, joining the practice of John Cloete. In September 1882, Beck was elected to the South African Philosophical Society, which would later become the Royal Society of South Africa, and remained a member for life. He was also a regular contributor to the then-South African Medical Journal.

He was appointed as Worcester district surgeon in 1883, but moved to Rondebosch near Cape Town in 1886, where he would remain for 20 years, becoming an additional district surgeon. He played a leading role in establishing the Rondebosch Cottage Hospital.

Beck was elected a member of the University of the Cape of Good Hope's council and served from 1886 to 1916, and served on the Cape Colonial Medical Council (today, the Health Professions Council of South Africa) between 1892 and 1903. He became President of the Cape Town branch of the British Medical Association in 1894. In 1903, he became a member of the South African Association for the Advancement of Science, of which he remained a part until at least 1906.

== Political career ==
In 1898 or 1899, a bill initially sponsored by Sir Gordon Sprigg, but now championed by Prime Minister William Philip Schreiner, enlarged the Cape House of Assembly by 15 members, one seat of which represented the constituency of Worcester. Beck won this seat right at the outset of the Second Boer War, and despite his sympathies with the Boer republics, remained loyal to the Cape and Britain.

In the immediate aftermath of the war, Beck was responsible for the treatment of the former State President of the Orange Free State, Martinus Theunis Steyn, who would later also be a delegate at the National Convention. He retired from his medical practice in 1903 and moved to Tulbagh.

Beck once joined John Xavier Merriman, Jan Christiaan Smuts and James Barry Munnik Hertzog on a trek to visit Robertson. He was also close friends with Louis Botha, who would become the first Prime Minister of South Africa.

After the Union of South Africa was established, Beck became a member of the Senate for the South African Party. He contested the race for the President of the Senate with Francis William Reitz (another former president of the Orange Free State), with Reitz winning the election after Beck withdrew as a favor to William Philip Schreiner. It was thought that one of the former leaders of the Boer republics should lead the Senate for symbolic and sentimental reasons.

Beck later became the Minister of Posts and Telegraphs in Louis Botha's second ministry, serving from 1915 to 1919. William Charles Scully wrote that "there was an urgent need for the extension of postal, telegraph and telephone facilities," but the Second World War made the necessary material expensive and difficult to obtain.

== Known works ==
Beck's known works include:

- Meiring Beck, JH. "An enquiry into the cause of camp fever at Kimberley". (1883). 3 Transactions. 48-52.
- Meiring Beck, JH. "Pathology from an 'evolution' point of view". (1885). 4 Transactions. 34-39, 40-44.
