= Aggeneys =

- Location within Northern Cape Location within South Africa
- Coordinates: 29°12′S 18°51′E
- Country: South Africa
- Province: Northern Cape
- District: Namakwa
- Municipality: Khâi-Ma

Area
  - Total: 205.68 km^{2} (79.41 sq mi)

Population (2011)
  - Total: 2,262
  - Density: 11.00/km^{2} (28.48/sq mi)

Racial makeup (2011)
  - Black African: 23.1%
  - Coloured: 61.8%
  - Indian/Asian: 0.6%
  - White: 14.3%
  - Other: 0.3%

First languages (2011)
  - Afrikaans: 81.5%
  - Xhosa: 10.3%
  - Tswana: 3.3%
  - English: 2.9%
  - Other: 2.0%
- Time zone: UTC+2 (SAST)
- PO box: 8893
- Area code: 054

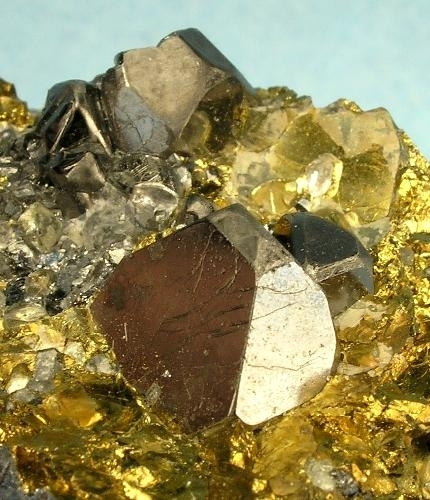
An unusual specimen of Aggeneys chalcopyrite (golden) and magnetite (dark), the latter well-crystallized in truncated octahedrons up to 1 cm.

Aggeneys is a mining town established in 1976 on a farm of that name, situated between Pofadder and Springbok in the Northern Cape, South Africa.

== Origin of the name ==
It has been stated that "no-one is quite certain of the origin of the name Aggeneys". Derived from the Nama language, suggested meanings include "Place of Blood", "Place of Red Clay" or "Place of Reeds". One author favours the last of these: the Nama word ‡a means "reed" while !keis means "place".

== Mining and geological contexts ==
Aggeneys the town, on a farm of that name, was founded to service the Black Mountain Mine, an underground base metal operation nearby, currently employing over 600 permanent staff. This zinc/lead/copper/silver mine is just to the west of the town. The produce of the mine is transported by truck to the nearest railway line, located 150 km (90 mi) to the south-east along a virtually straight gravel (dirt) road. The diversified ore is then railed down to Saldanha Bay where it is exported out in 50,000-ton vessels from a 250-metre-long quay built for the purpose in 1978. A major zinc deposit has been identified in the nearby Gamsberg inselberg, also set to be mined.

The areas hills, mountains and inselbergs display some of the most diverse and complex geology in Southern Africa including some of the rich concentrations of copper, lead and zinc.

== Environmental setting ==
In a semi-desert landscape, lawns and trees planted when the town was established accentuate the sense of ‘oasis’ and one of the town's principal attractions is its golf course. The town's water wants are greater than could be supplied by any nearby springs, however, and all is kept green by water pumped up from the Orange River some 40 km to the north.

But beyond the edges of town the arid conditions and the unique ecologies on the various peaks ,hills and plains, with their varied rocky and shallow soil substrate, support a wide range of plants, animals, birds and insects, including rare and endemic species. The writer William Charles Scully wrote that, “for sheer uncompromising aridity, for stark grotesque naked horror, these mountains stand probably unsurpassed on the face of the globe.”

Average, but variable, annual rainfall at the town is about 112 mm, with greatest precipitation occurring between January and April. The lowest recorded annual rainfall (11 mm) was measured in 1992, while the ‘wettest’ year (220 mm) was recorded in 2006. Temperatures average between 15 °C and 38 °C in summer and between 0 °C and 18 °C in winter.

Close by is the mountain of Ghaamsberg which is thought to house some of the last known indigenous Bushman tribes.

== Transportation ==
The town is served by an airstrip known as the Aggeneys Airport. No scheduled flights operate to and from this airstrip.
