= Skully =

Skully may refer to:

== People ==
=== In music ===
- David 'Skully' Sullivan Kaplan (born 1979), drummer of Razorlight
- Noel Simms (1935–2017), ska/reggae singer-percussionist
- Vin Skully, hip-hop producer of Styles of Beyond
- Allan 'Skully' Skolski, vocalist of U.S. Chaos

=== Other people and characters ===
- John Skully (fl. 1388 – c. 1407), English politician
- Skully, a fictional anthropomorphic parrot in Jake and the Never Land Pirates

== Other uses ==
- Skully (game), a children's street game
- Skully (helmet), a motorcycle headgear brand

== See also ==
- Skuły, Poland
- Scully (disambiguation)
