= Skully (helmet) =

Motorcycle helmet brand

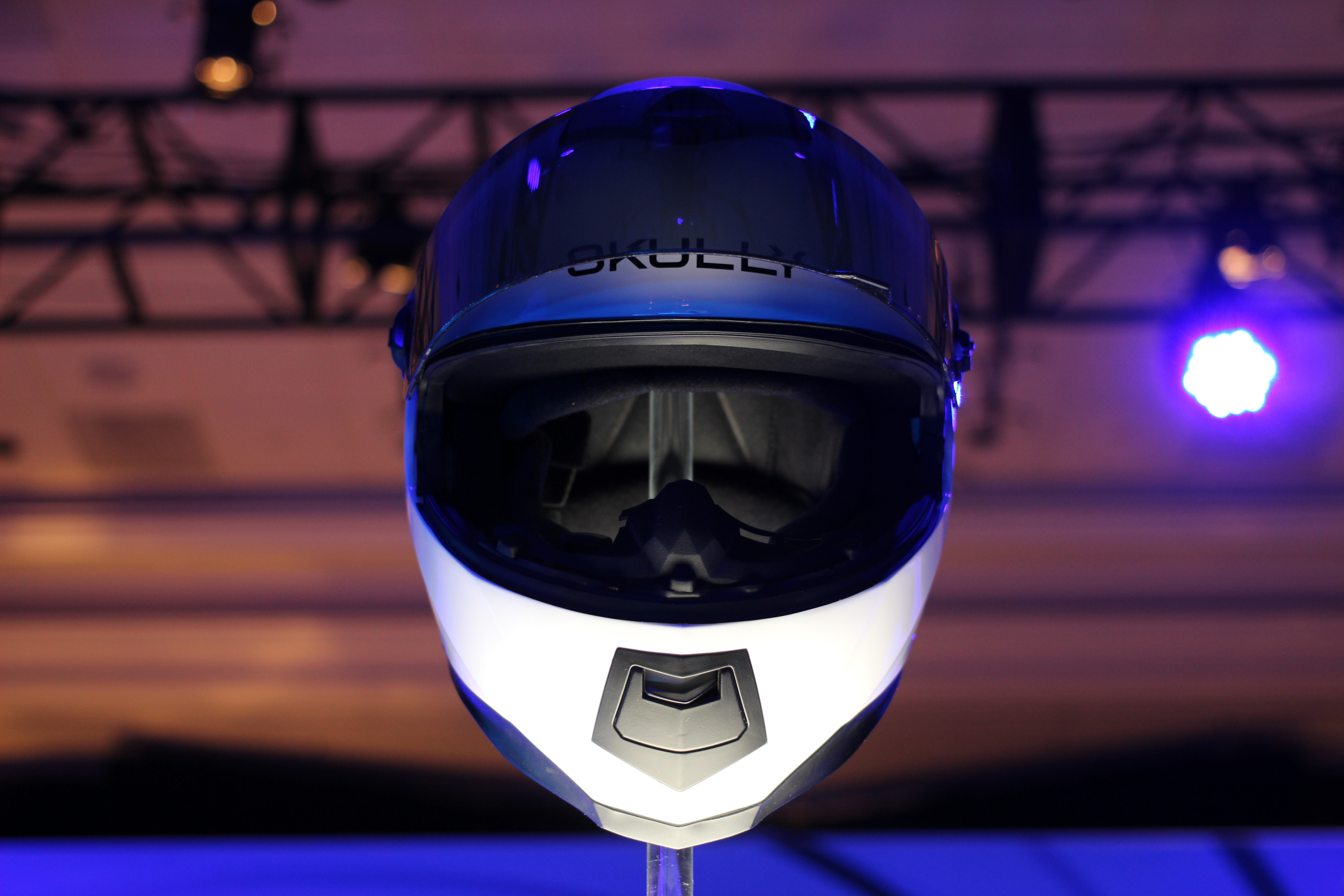
- Skully AR-1 Helmet
- Inception: 2013
- Manufacturer: Skully Technologies
- Available: Pre-orders August, 2014
- Current supplier: none
- Last production year: unknown
- Website: skullytechnologies.com

Skully was a brand of motorcycle helmet with a heads-up display and a rear-facing camera.

== Skully Helmets Inc ==
The helmet was invented by Marcus Weller who also served as the company chief executive officer. As of July 12, 2016 Marcus Weller was removed as CEO and replaced by Martin Fitcher. Fichter was an executive at mobile device company HTC's American subsidiary in Bellevue, Washington. The helmet's software is based on the Android platform, and can be controlled with voice commands. Users can see rearward through the heads-up display and the rear camera. The helmet also includes Bluetooth functionality, allowing music streaming from smartphones.

As of August, 2014, the manufacturer was taking preorders for the helmet. The company also had the fastest fully funded Indiegogo crowdfunding campaign to-date, raising $1.1 million. However, there were significant production delays with the helmet including company insider accounts estimating no more than 20 to 100 shipped units as of July 12, 2016.

Skully Helmets Inc shut down in July 2016 and was expected to declare bankruptcy shortly afterward. Despite having raised $2.5 million through the Indiegogo crowdfunding campaign, and an additional $11 million in venture capital from Intel and others, the company was unable to secure additional funding. Former executive assistant, Isabelle Faithauer, sued Skully Helmets Inc and the founders, Marcus and Mitchell Weller, for fraudulently using corporate funds for personal use, although Marcus Weller denied the claims of the lawsuit. The lawsuit was later dropped.

Skully Helmets Inc was also sued by supplier Flextronics for over $1 million in unpaid inventory expenses. The case was stayed during bankruptcy proceedings, and the assets were sold to Skully Technologies.

== Skully Technologies ==
The assets of Skully Helmets Inc were acquired in 2017 by Ivan and Rafael Contreras, renaming the company Skully Technologies and relocating it to Atlanta, Georgia. The new owners demonstrated a new prototype at the 2018 Consumer Electronics Show, with plans to begin shipping that summer. The new company also promised to provide a helmet to anyone who had ordered one through the IndieGoGo campaign. The company sent confirmation emails on Friday September 21, 2018 to IndieGoGo campaign supporters that paid for the helmet in 2014. As of March 2020, neither those who have been promised a helmet through the IndieGoGo campaign or have made new orders have received a helmet from the Company. In February 2020 the new web site was closed, the App Stores dropped the Skully app, the corporate phone number was turned off, and although the Facebook page still exists, no one answers questions. It seems that the second Skully company has also failed.
