= Aggeneys Airport =

- IATA: AGZ; ICAO: FAAG

Summary
- Airport type: Public
- Serves: Aggeneys (Namakwa District Municipality), Northern Cape, South Africa
- Elevation AMSL: 2,648 ft (807 m)
- Coordinates: 29°16′54″S 018°48′49″E

Map
- Location in the Northern Cape AGZ (South Africa)

Runways
| Direction | Length | | Surface |
| Direction | m | ft | Surface |
|---|---|---|---|
| 07/25 | 2,080 | 6,824 | Asphalt |
- Source: DAFIF

Aggeneys Airport (IATA: AGZ, ICAO: FAAG) is an airport serving Aggeneys, a town in the Northern Cape, South Africa.

== Facilities ==
The airport resides at an elevation of 2,648 feet (807 m) above mean sea level. It has one runway designated 07/25 with an asphalt surface measuring 2,080 by 20 metres (6,824 ft × 66 ft).The nearest airport to it is Randburg Heliport Airport.

== See also ==
- List of airports in South Africa
