= James Scully =

James or Jim Scully may refer to:

- James Scully (GC) (1909–1974), of the Pioneer Corps; awarded the George Cross
- James Scully (poet) (born 1937), American poet
- Skull the Slayer (James Patrick Scully), a comic book character
- Jim Scully (public servant), Australian public servant
- James Scully (actor) (born 1992), American actor
