= William Scully (Irish-American landlord) =

Irish-American landlord of farming land in the United States

- Born: 1821; County Tipperary, Ireland
- Died: 1906 (aged 84–85); United States
- Occupation: Landlord
- Known for: Being the largest American landowner in his day

William Scully (1821–1906) was an Irish-American landlord who inherited lands in Ireland then moved to the United States in 1850. He bought large amounts of land in the Corn Belt, and leased it to tenants in. He became a target of farmer grievances. He was the largest American landowner in his day, and his descendants still control major properties.

== Early life ==
Scully was the fifth son and ninth child of Denys and Catherine Scully, members of a prominent Catholic family of landowners involved in bitter disputes in County Tipperary, Ireland. His oldest brother was murdered in one of these disputes.

== Career ==
Scully began by buying unused land warrants given to veterans of the Mexican-American War. He then worked with new railroads which had land grants and needed farmers on their lands. Scully was attractive to them because he bought large quantities of land and promptly set up farms for tenants to rent.

In 1851, he added more than twenty-one thousand acres to his Illinois holdings, which became the basis of his tremendous wealth. By the time of his death in 1906, he owned 225,000 acres in Illinois, Kansas, Nebraska, and Missouri making him the largest landowner in the United States. His field agents worked with 1,200 tenants who paid cash rent for one year at a time; most of whom were saving to buy land from someone willing to sell.

His reputation was that of a strict, legalistic and harsh landlord, which created resentment. He demanded that tenants keep up with the latest technical innovations. His descendants continue to own the properties.

== See also ==
- Corn Belt
- History of Kansas
