= William Charles Scully =

South African writer (1855–1943)

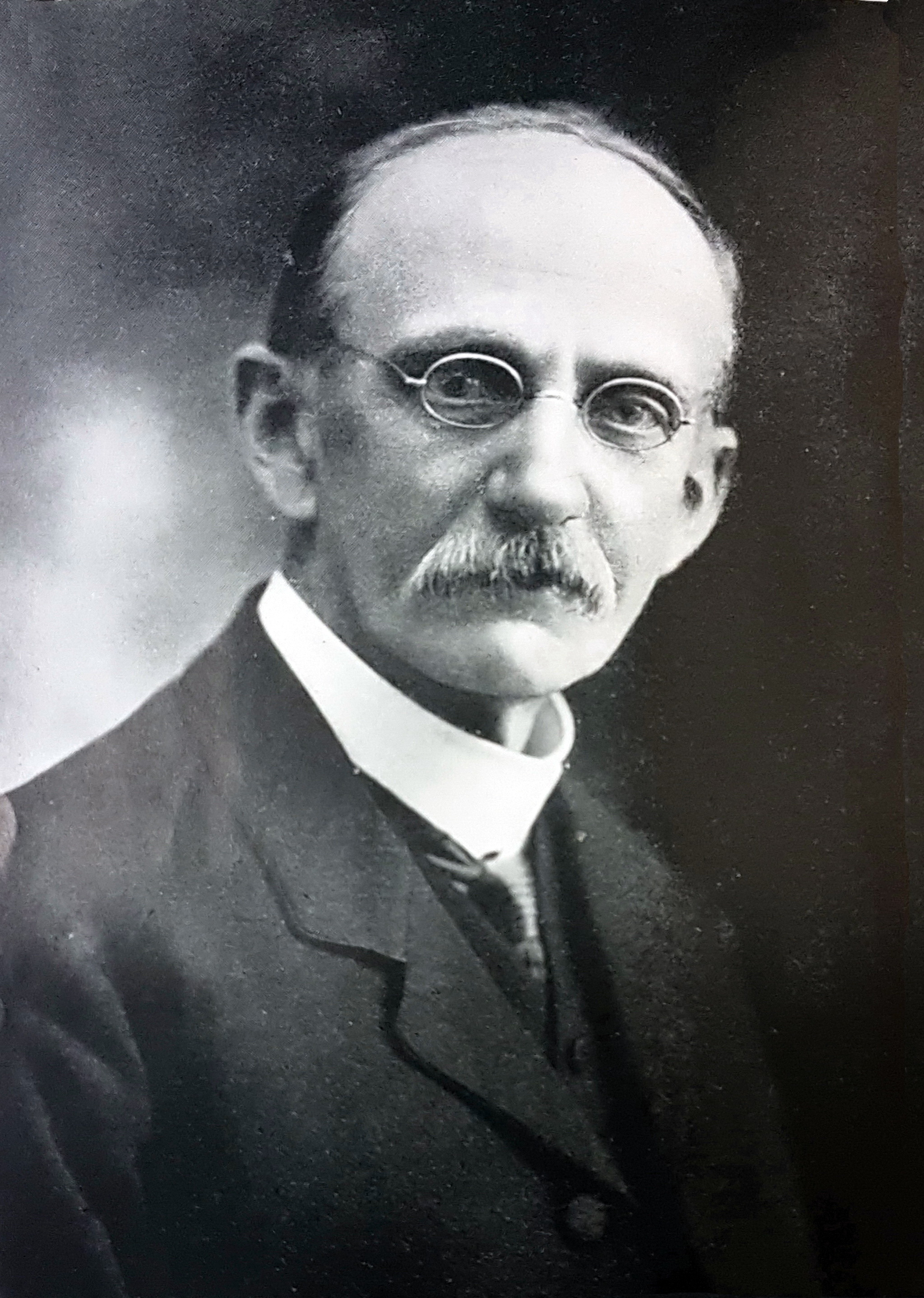
- Born: 29 October 1855; Dublin, Ireland
- Died: 25 August 1943 (aged 87); Umbogintwini, South Africa
- Occupations: author, prospector, magistrate
- Notable work: Daniel Vananda, The Harrow
- Spouse(s): Ellen Doveton; Honoria (Nora) Emily Richards
- Children: Elaine Scully; Gerald Creagh Scully; Ernest Richard Scully; Miriam Power Scully; Lillah Lucy Madeline Scully; Elizabeth Ethne Scully

Signature
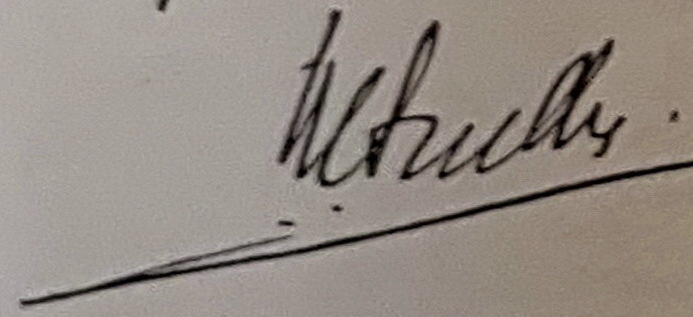

William Charles Scully (29 October 1855 – 25 August 1943) is one of South Africa's best-known authors, although little known outside South Africa. In addition to his work as an author, his paid work was principally as a magistrate in Springfontein, South Africa, as well as in Namaqualand and the Transkei. His last position before retirement was as Chief Magistrate of Port Elizabeth, one of South Africa's larger cities. He organised the building of "New Brighton", a township for aboriginal African people in Port Elizabeth. At the time it was regarded as very progressive—a pleasant place to live.

Scully was born in Dublin, Ireland, raised in Cashel, County Tipperary, and then emigrated to southern Africa with his parents in 1867. During 1871 he prospected for diamonds with Cecil Rhodes in Africa. His daughter, Miriam Power (born 1893), married Dr John A. Ryle; their children included Sir Martin Ryle, Nobel laureate and Astronomer Royal from 1972 to 1982. Scully died in Umbogintwini on KwaZulu-Natal's coast in 1943; his second wife (Nora) also died that same year.

His novel Daniel Vananda describes the violence engendered by the ethnic legislation of the time. Similarly, Kafir Stories contains stories that are generally sympathetic with the aboriginal African peoples of South Africa.

After the Boer War, Scully was appointed chair of a commission to investigate war crimes by the British forces in the Cape Province. (The main war crimes were committed in the Transvaal and the Free State.) After this he wrote The Harrow, which was fictional but based on cases which the commission had investigated. He supplied the publishers with a key to every incident in the book—but with the proviso that this should never be published. Years later he regretted writing the book.

== Works ==
His published works include:

- Poems, London, Unwin, 1885
- The Wreck of the Grosvenor, and other South African poems. South Africa, 1886.
- (Anon.) Poems. 1892.
- Kafir Stories. (2nd ed.) London: T. Fisher Unwin, 1895
- The White Hecatomb, and other stories. London: Methuen, 1897
- Between Sun and Sand: a Tale of an African Desert. 1898.
- A Vendetta of the Desert. London: Methuen, 1898
- By Veldt and Kopje. London: T. Fisher Unwin, 1907
- The Ridge of the White Waters: "Witwatersrand", or, Impressions of a Visit to Johannesburg: with some notes of Durban, Delagoa Bay and the low country. London: Stanley Paul, nd (c. 1912)
- Reminiscences of a South African Pioneer. London: T. Fisher Unwin, 1913
- Further Reminiscences of a South African Pioneer. London: T Fisher Unwin, 1913
- Lodges in the Wilderness. London: H. Jenkins, 1915
- A History of South Africa: From the earliest days to union. London and New York: Longmans, Green, and Company, 1915
- ”The South African Chacma Baboon", The Atlantic Monthly Vol. 124, 1919, pp. 809.
- Sir J. H. Meiring Beck: A Memoir compiled by William Charles Scully, with an introduction by John X. Merriman. Cape Town: Maskew Miller, nd (c. 1921)
- The Harrow: South Africa, 1900–1902: a novel. Cape Town: De Nationale Pers, 1921
- Daniel Vananda: The Life Story of a Human Being. Cape Town: Juta Ltd, 1923
- Scopolamine in Africa, or Pharmacy and Politics, Kimberley, Creer & Co., 1937
- Voices of Africa, Durban, Knox, 1943

== Sources ==
- Doyle, John Robert Jr., 1978. William Charles Scully. Twayne Publishing, 1978
