= Khâi-Ma Local Municipality elections =

South African political elections

The Khâi-Ma Local Municipality council consists of eleven members elected by mixed-member proportional representation. Six councillors are elected by first-past-the-post voting in six wards, while the remaining five are chosen from party lists so that the total number of party representatives is proportional to the number of votes received. In the election of 1 November 2021 the African National Congress (ANC) won a majority of six seats.

== Results ==
The following table shows the composition of the council after past elections.

Event	ANC	COPE	DA	Other	Total
2000 election	5	—	2	—	7
2006 election	5	—	1	1	7
2011 election	4	2	1	—	7
2016 election	4	1	2	0	7
2021 election	6	1	1	3	11

== December 2000 election ==
The following table shows the results of the 2000 election.

Party	Ward			List			Total seats
Party	Votes	%	Seats	Votes	%	Seats	Total seats
African National Congress	2,322	71.82	4	2,331	72.01	1	5
Democratic Alliance	911	28.18	0	906	27.99	2	2
Total	3,233	100.00	4	3,237	100.00	3	7
Valid votes	3,233	98.54		3,237	98.66		
Invalid/blank votes	48	1.46		44	1.34		
Total votes	3,281	100.00		3,281	100.00		
Registered voters/turnout	5,055	64.91		5,055	64.91		

== March 2006 election ==
The following table shows the results of the 2006 election.

Party	Ward			List			Total seats
Party	Votes	%	Seats	Votes	%	Seats	Total seats
African National Congress	2,728	77.97	3	2,731	78.14	2	5
Democratic Alliance	507	14.49	1	506	14.48	0	1
Independent Democrats	264	7.55	0	258	7.38	1	1
Total	3,499	100.00	4	3,495	100.00	3	7
Valid votes	3,499	98.70		3,495	98.59		
Invalid/blank votes	46	1.30		50	1.41		
Total votes	3,545	100.00		3,545	100.00		
Registered voters/turnout	6,104	58.08		6,104	58.08		

== May 2011 election ==
The following table shows the results of the 2011 election.

Party	Ward			List			Total seats
Party	Votes	%	Seats	Votes	%	Seats	Total seats
African National Congress	2,710	58.13	4	2,718	58.30	0	4
Congress of the People	1,338	28.70	0	1,329	28.51	2	2
Democratic Alliance	614	13.17	0	615	13.19	1	1
Total	4,662	100.00	4	4,662	100.00	3	7
Valid votes	4,662	98.98		4,662	99.02		
Invalid/blank votes	48	1.02		46	0.98		
Total votes	4,710	100.00		4,708	100.00		
Registered voters/turnout	6,873	68.53		6,873	68.50		

== August 2016 election ==
The following table shows the results of the 2016 election.

Party	Ward			List			Total seats
Party	Votes	%	Seats	Votes	%	Seats	Total seats
African National Congress	2,328	56.60	4	2,362	57.37	0	4
Democratic Alliance	1,011	24.58	0	991	24.07	2	2
Congress of the People	272	6.61	0	279	6.78	1	1
Khai-Ma Onafhanklike Kandidate Koalisie	279	6.78	0	245	5.95	0	0
Die Forum	124	3.01	0	113	2.74	0	0
Economic Freedom Fighters	50	1.22	0	79	1.92	0	0
Freedom Front Plus	49	1.19	0	48	1.17	0	0
Total	4,113	100.00	4	4,117	100.00	3	7
Valid votes	4,113	100.00		4,117	100.00		
Invalid/blank votes	0	0.00		0	0.00		
Total votes	4,113	100.00		4,117	100.00		
Registered voters/turnout	7,129	57.69		7,129	57.75		

== November 2021 election ==
The following table shows the results of the 2021 election.

Party	Ward			List			Total seats
Party	Votes	%	Seats	Votes	%	Seats	Total seats
African National Congress	2,199	50.42	6	2,204	50.67	0	6
Namakwa Civic Movement	820	18.80	0	889	20.44	2	2
Democratic Alliance	512	11.74	0	507	11.66	1	1
Economic Freedom Fighters	272	6.24	0	275	6.32	1	1
Congress of the People	255	5.85	0	247	5.68	1	1
Freedom Front Plus	147	3.37	0	143	3.29	0	0
National Economic Fighters	52	1.19	0	61	1.40	0	0
Independent candidates	89	2.04	0				0
African Transformation Movement	11	0.25	0	19	0.44	0	0
South African Royal Kingdoms Organization	4	0.09	0	5	0.11	0	0
Total	4,361	100.00	6	4,350	100.00	5	11
Valid votes	4,361	98.71		4,350	98.33		
Invalid/blank votes	57	1.29		74	1.67		
Total votes	4,418	100.00		4,424	100.00		
Registered voters/turnout	7,799	56.65		7,799	56.73		
