= Palfuria gibbosa =

Scientific classification
- Kingdom: Animalia
- Phylum: Arthropoda
- Subphylum: Chelicerata
- Class: Arachnida
- Order: Araneae
- Infraorder: Araneomorphae
- Family: Zodariidae
- Genus: Palfuria
- Species: P. gibbosa

Binomial name
- Palfuria gibbosa (Lessert, 1936)

Species of spider

Palfuria gibbosa is a spider species of the family Zodariidae.

The closest relatives of P. gibbosa are P. spirembolus and P. hirsuta.

== Distribution ==
P. gibbosa occurs in Mozambique.
