= Nama Khoi Local Municipality elections =

The Nama Khoi Local Municipality council consists of seventeen members elected by mixed-member proportional representation. Nine councillors are elected by first-past-the-post voting in nine wards, while the remaining eight are chosen from party lists so that the total number of party representatives is proportional to the number of votes received. In the election of 1 November 2021 no party won a majority on the council, with the African National Congress (ANC) winning the largest number of seats, seven.

== Results ==
The following table shows the composition of the council after past elections.

Event	ANC	COPE	DA	Other	Total
2000 election	10	—	7	0	17
2006 election	9	—	2	6	17
2011 election	8	3	6	0	17
2016 election	8	1	7	1	17
2021 election	7	0	5	5	17

== December 2000 election ==
The following table shows the results of the 2000 election.

Party	Ward			List			Total seats
Party	Votes	%	Seats	Votes	%	Seats	Total seats
African National Congress	6,991	54.24	8	7,108	55.47	2	10
Democratic Alliance	5,421	42.06	1	5,707	44.53	6	7
Independent candidates	476	3.69	0				0
Total	12,888	100.00	9	12,815	100.00	8	17
Valid votes	12,888	98.31		12,815	97.76		
Invalid/blank votes	221	1.69		294	2.24		
Total votes	13,109	100.00		13,109	100.00		
Registered voters/turnout	22,304	58.77		22,304	58.77		

== March 2006 election ==
The following table shows the results of the 2006 election.

Party	Ward			List			Total seats
Party	Votes	%	Seats	Votes	%	Seats	Total seats
African National Congress	7,228	51.87	8	7,207	51.68	1	9
Independent Democrats	4,711	33.80	1	4,683	33.58	5	6
Democratic Alliance	1,830	13.13	0	1,907	13.68	2	2
African Christian Democratic Party	167	1.20	0	148	1.06	0	0
Total	13,936	100.00	9	13,945	100.00	8	17
Valid votes	13,936	98.59		13,945	98.65		
Invalid/blank votes	200	1.41		191	1.35		
Total votes	14,136	100.00		14,136	100.00		
Registered voters/turnout	25,779	54.84		25,779	54.84		

== May 2011 election ==
The following table shows the results of the 2011 election.

Party	Ward			List			Total seats
Party	Votes	%	Seats	Votes	%	Seats	Total seats
African National Congress	8,871	48.90	6	8,868	48.94	2	8
Democratic Alliance	6,293	34.69	3	6,455	35.62	3	6
Congress of the People	2,978	16.41	0	2,798	15.44	3	3
Total	18,142	100.00	9	18,121	100.00	8	17
Valid votes	18,142	99.15		18,121	99.24		
Invalid/blank votes	156	0.85		139	0.76		
Total votes	18,298	100.00		18,260	100.00		
Registered voters/turnout	27,265	67.11		27,265	66.97		

== August 2016 election ==
The following table shows the results of the 2016 election.

Party	Ward			List			Total seats
Party	Votes	%	Seats	Votes	%	Seats	Total seats
African National Congress	7,812	46.75	7	7,792	46.71	1	8
Democratic Alliance	6,737	40.32	2	6,958	41.71	5	7
Khoisan Revolution	855	5.12	0	865	5.19	1	1
Congress of the People	633	3.79	0	628	3.76	1	1
Economic Freedom Fighters	295	1.77	0	296	1.77	0	0
Independent candidates	273	1.63	0				0
Freedom Front Plus	105	0.63	0	143	0.86	0	0
Total	16,710	100.00	9	16,682	100.00	8	17
Valid votes	16,710	99.45		16,682	99.27		
Invalid/blank votes	93	0.55		123	0.73		
Total votes	16,803	100.00		16,805	100.00		
Registered voters/turnout	28,971	58.00		28,971	58.01		

== November 2021 election ==
The following table shows the results of the 2021 election.

Party	Ward			List			Total seats
Party	Votes	%	Seats	Votes	%	Seats	Total seats
African National Congress	6,625	42.36	7	6,513	41.66	0	7
Democratic Alliance	4,665	29.83	1	4,739	30.31	4	5
Namakwa Civic Movement	3,229	20.65	1	3,290	21.04	3	4
Freedom Front Plus	223	1.43	0	234	1.50	1	1
Khoisan Revolution	213	1.36	0	225	1.44	0	0
Good	145	0.93	0	147	0.94	0	0
Patriotic Alliance	123	0.79	0	168	1.07	0	0
Congress of the People	131	0.84	0	143	0.91	0	0
Economic Freedom Fighters	115	0.74	0	120	0.77	0	0
National Economic Fighters	132	0.84	0				0
Independent Civic Organisation of South Africa	34	0.22	0	31	0.20	0	0
African Transformation Movement	1	0.01	0	19	0.12	0	0
South African Royal Kingdoms Organization	4	0.03	0	6	0.04	0	0
Total	15,640	100.00	9	15,635	100.00	8	17
Valid votes	15,640	98.90		15,635	98.87		
Invalid/blank votes	174	1.10		179	1.13		
Total votes	15,814	100.00		15,814	100.00		
Registered voters/turnout	29,072	54.40		29,072	54.40		

Following the election, the Democratic Alliance (DA) and Namakwa Civic Movement (NCM) formed a coalition.

=== By-elections from November 2021 ===
The following by-elections were held to fill vacant ward seats in the period since the election in November 2021.

Date	Ward	Party of the previous councillor	Party of the newly elected councillor
14 May 2025	5	Namakwa Civic Movement	African National Congress
28 May 2025	6	African National Congress	African National Congress

After the 14 May 2024 by-election, the council was reconfigured as below:

Party	Seats		
Party	Ward	List	Total
African National Congress	8	0	8
Democratic Alliance	1	4	5
Namakwa Civic Movement	0	3	3
Freedom Front Plus	0	1	1
Total	9	8	17

The Freedom Front Plus (FF+) became the kingmaker and a required member for any governing coalition.
