= Crassothonna agaatbergensis =

Scientific classification
- Kingdom: Plantae
- Clade: Tracheophytes
- Clade: Angiosperms
- Clade: Eudicots
- Clade: Asterids
- Order: Asterales
- Family: Asteraceae
- Genus: Crassothonna
- Species: C. agaatbergensis

Binomial name
- Crassothonna agaatbergensis Swanepoel

Species of plant

Crassothonna agaatbergensis is a species of the genus Crassothonna in the family Asteraceae, and is found only in the northern part of the Skeleton Coast (Namib Desert) in the Kaokoveld Centre of Endemism, northwestern Namibia.

== Description ==
This species is described as a shrublet up to 150 mm high with cylindrical or clavate leaves 10–70 mm long and 2–7 mm in diameter. Yellow flowers on a long stalk. Bulbous, partially buried caudex.

== Taxonomy ==
It was described by Swanepoel in 2019, as a new species during work done as part of the SCIONA project (Skeleton Coast Transfrontier Conservation Area of Angola and Namibia). Morphometrically, this new species appears to be closely related to Crassothonna clavifolia and Crassothonna protecta.

== Distribution and habitat ==
This species grows on basalt at the peak of Agaatberg Mountain. Only known from this single location in the Skeleton Coast National Park. Based on IUCN Red List categories and criteria, a conservation assessment of Endangered (EN D) was recommended for the new species by Swanepoel and De Cauwer.
