= Hantam Local Municipality elections =

The Hantam Local Municipality council consists of thirteen members elected by mixed-member proportional representation. Seven councillors are elected by first-past-the-post voting in seven wards, while the remaining six are chosen from party lists so that the total number of party representatives is proportional to the number of votes received. In the election of 1 November 2021 the African National Congress (ANC) lost its majority, but still remained the largest party, with six seats.

== Results ==
The following table shows the composition of the council after past elections.

Event	ANC	DA	Other	Total
2000 election	6	4	—	10
2006 election	6	3	0	9
2011 election	4	4	1	9
2016 election	5	4	—	9
2021 election	6	4	3	13

== December 2000 election ==
The following table shows the results of the 2000 election.

Party	Ward			List			Total seats
Party	Votes	%	Seats	Votes	%	Seats	Total seats
African National Congress	3,651	56.38	4	3,703	57.01	1	5
Democratic Alliance	2,825	43.62	1	2,792	42.99	3	4
Total	6,476	100.00	5	6,495	100.00	4	9
Valid votes	6,476	98.99		6,495	98.92		
Invalid/blank votes	66	1.01		71	1.08		
Total votes	6,542	100.00		6,566	100.00		
Registered voters/turnout	9,260	70.65		9,260	70.91		

== March 2006 election ==
The following table shows the results of the 2006 election.

Party	Ward			List			Total seats
Party	Votes	%	Seats	Votes	%	Seats	Total seats
African National Congress	4,078	64.75	5	4,081	65.16	1	6
Democratic Alliance	1,882	29.88	0	1,915	30.58	3	3
African Christian Democratic Party	278	4.41	0	267	4.26	0	0
Independent candidates	60	0.95	0				0
Total	6,298	100.00	5	6,263	100.00	4	9
Valid votes	6,298	98.34		6,263	98.27		
Invalid/blank votes	106	1.66		110	1.73		
Total votes	6,404	100.00		6,373	100.00		
Registered voters/turnout	10,826	59.15		10,826	58.87		

== May 2011 election ==
The following table shows the results of the 2011 election.

Party	Ward			List			Total seats
Party	Votes	%	Seats	Votes	%	Seats	Total seats
African National Congress	4,179	49.64	4	4,111	48.65	0	4
Democratic Alliance	3,493	41.49	1	3,618	42.81	3	4
Congress of the People	747	8.87	0	722	8.54	1	1
Total	8,419	100.00	5	8,451	100.00	4	9
Valid votes	8,419	98.70		8,451	99.02		
Invalid/blank votes	111	1.30		84	0.98		
Total votes	8,530	100.00		8,535	100.00		
Registered voters/turnout	12,330	69.18		12,330	69.22		

== August 2016 election ==
The following table shows the results of the 2016 election.

Party	Ward			List			Total seats
Party	Votes	%	Seats	Votes	%	Seats	Total seats
African National Congress	4,166	47.74	3	4,222	49.85	2	5
Democratic Alliance	3,163	36.24	2	3,201	37.79	2	4
Congress of the People	354	4.06	0	349	4.12	0	0
Freedom Front Plus	321	3.68	0	319	3.77	0	0
Independent candidates	382	4.38	0				0
Khoisan Revolution	154	1.76	0	177	2.09	0	0
Economic Freedom Fighters	102	1.17	0	98	1.16	0	0
Hantam Ontwikkelings Forum	85	0.97	0	104	1.23	0	0
Total	8,727	100.00	5	8,470	100.00	4	9
Valid votes	8,727	99.01		8,470	98.11		
Invalid/blank votes	87	0.99		163	1.89		
Total votes	8,814	100.00		8,633	100.00		
Registered voters/turnout	13,339	66.08		13,339	64.72		

== November 2021 election ==
In 2021, the ANC lost its majority, but was supported by the Patriotic Alliance, allowing it to retain control.

The following table shows the results of the 2021 election.

Party	Ward			List			Total seats
Party	Votes	%	Seats	Votes	%	Seats	Total seats
African National Congress	3,660	44.54	5	3,637	44.52	1	6
Democratic Alliance	2,322	28.26	2	2,359	28.88	2	4
Patriotic Alliance	602	7.33	0	623	7.63	1	1
Freedom Front Plus	604	7.35	0	587	7.19	1	1
Namakwa Civic Movement	338	4.11	0	390	4.77	1	1
Good	240	2.92	0	254	3.11	0	0
Congress of the People	144	1.75	0	216	2.64	0	0
Independent candidates	207	2.52	0				0
Economic Freedom Fighters	75	0.91	0	82	1.00	0	0
African Christian Democratic Party	26	0.32	0	21	0.26	0	0
Total	8,218	100.00	7	8,169	100.00	6	13
Valid votes	8,218	98.08		8,169	97.94		
Invalid/blank votes	161	1.92		172	2.06		
Total votes	8,379	100.00		8,341	100.00		
Registered voters/turnout	13,732	61.02		13,732	60.74		

=== By-elections from November 2021 ===
The following by-elections were held to fill vacant ward seats in the period from the election in November 2021.

Date	Ward	Party of the previous councillor	Party of the newly elected councillor
18 Dec 2024	7	Democratic Alliance	African National Congress
26 Nov 2025	7	African National Congress	African National Congress
