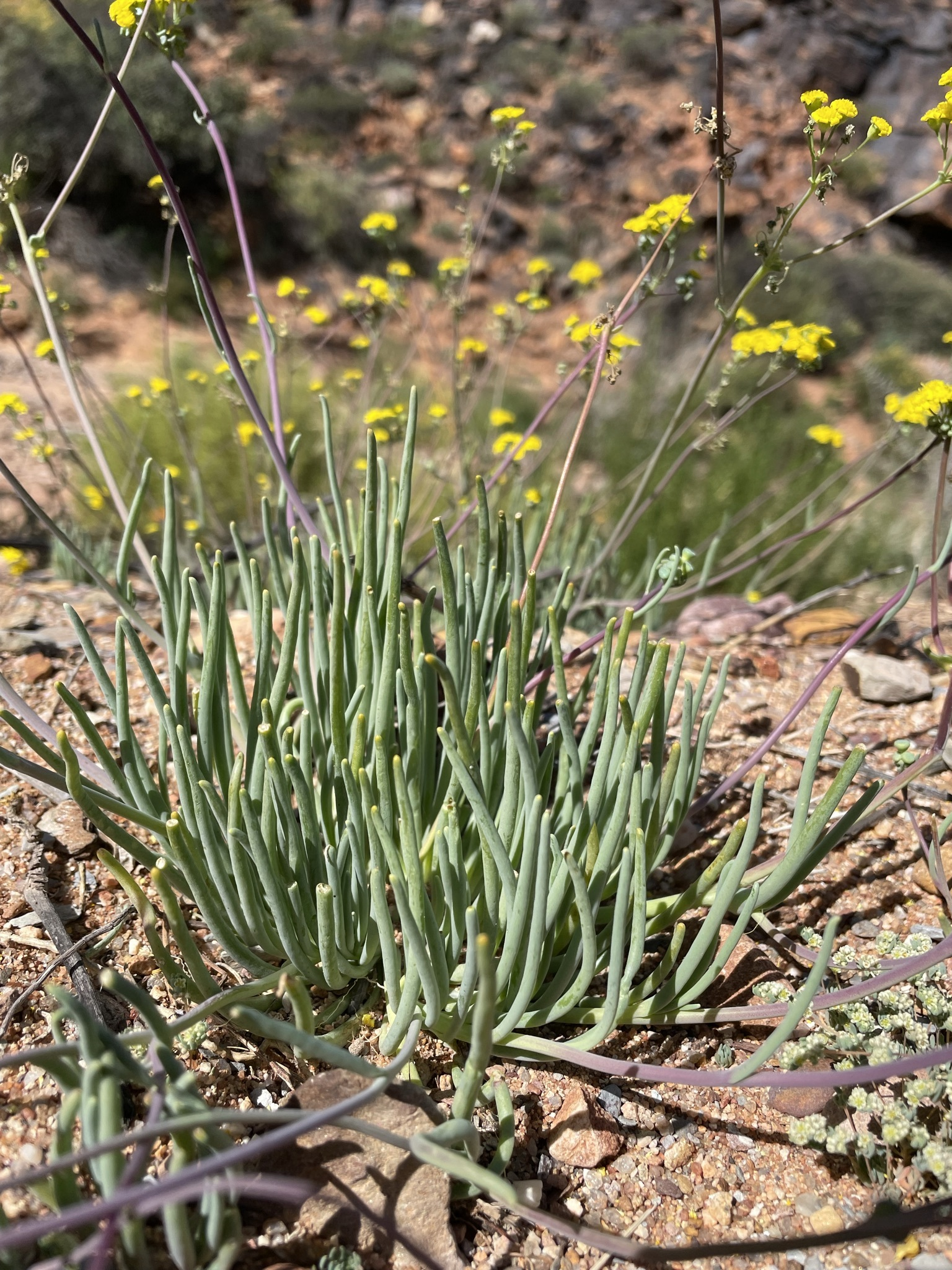
- Gymnodiscus linearifolius
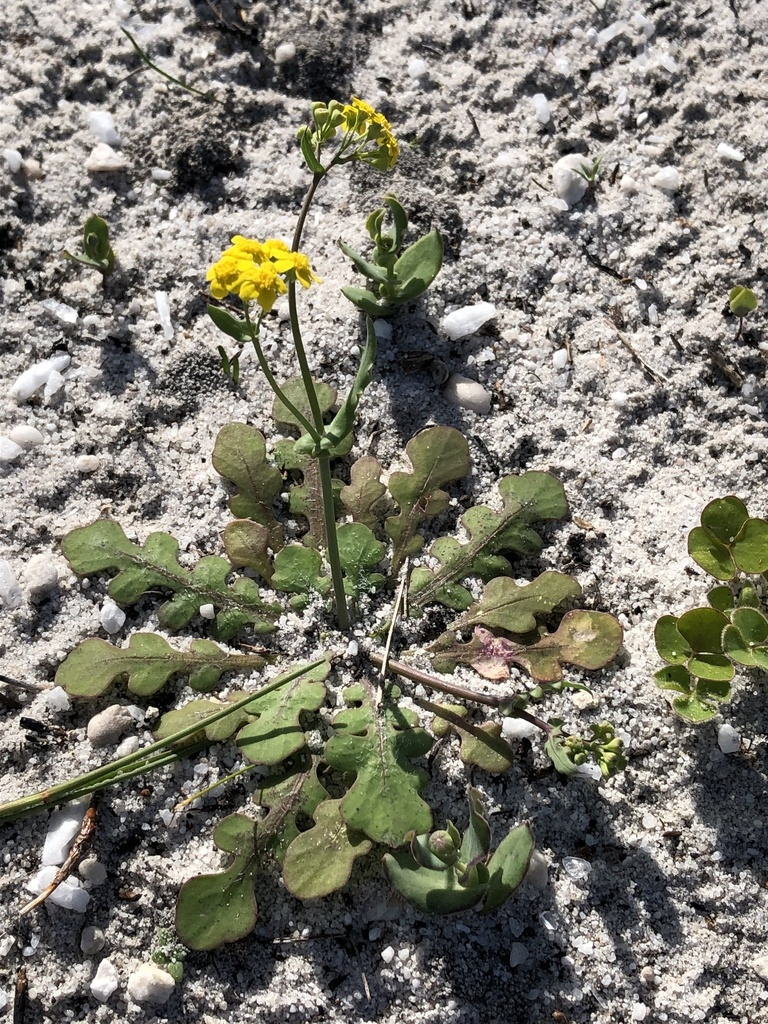
- Gymnodiscus capillaris

Scientific classification
- Kingdom: Plantae
- Clade: Embryophytes
- Clade: Tracheophytes
- Clade: Spermatophytes
- Clade: Angiosperms
- Clade: Eudicots
- Clade: Asterids
- Order: Asterales
- Family: Asteraceae
- Subfamily: Asteroideae
- Tribe: Senecioneae
- Genus: Gymnodiscus; Less.

Type species
- Othonna capillaris L.f.

= Gymnodiscus =

Genus of flowering plants

Gymnodiscus is a genus of two species of annual flowering plants in the sunflower family. Both have yellow flowerheads with both ray and disc florets and very short pappus, with only the ray florets setting seed. The leaves are in a basal rosette. The genus is called geelkruid in Afrikaans and hair daisy in English. The continued survival of both species is considered to be of least concern.

== Description ==
The species of geelkruid are annual herbs of usually up to 20 cm (7.9 in) tall, with a leaf rosette at their base, with peduncles that branch from base, with cobweb hairs in its heart and with a slender taproot. All leaves are set in a circle at the plants foot, laying flat on the ground or spreading to more or less upright but recurving. The leaves are either succulent and spindle-shaped, or leathery and inverted egg- to spathula-shaped to inverted lance-shaped or with a large terminal lobe and smaller rounded lobes toward its base. The leaves are often mottled purple or purple on the underside. The midvein extends at the tip in a sharp point. There are one to several peduncles rising from the leaf rosette that branche higher up, carrying few bracts. Sometimes there are also peduncles emerging sideways from the axils of the leaf-like bracts, the bracts higher up are small and line- to heart-shaped. The flowerheads (or capitula) have both central disk florets and ray florets along the rim. The flowerheads appear in small clusters approximately in a curved plain, and several of these cluster jointly form a aggregated panicle-like inflorescences. The involucre of green bracts surrounding the yellow florets in each flowerhead is bell- to almost globe-shaped. It consists of one row of five to eight, rarely nine free bracts. These are lance-shaped to elliptic, hairless, chaff-like along the margins and have darker tips. The base of the flowerhead on which the individual florets are implanted is cone-shaped, pitted where the florets sit, hairless and without scales. The five to nine ray florets are functionally bisexual and yellow in colour, and elliptic to oval above the split of the tube at the base. The ovary is elliptic to inverted egg-shaped, hairless or with very short, fine and scarcely visible downy twin-hairs. The style is cylindrical above the slightly thickened base and splits near the top in two branches with two distinct lateral stigmas, the tips narrowly egg-shaped and shortly grainy in structure. The dark brown, one-seeded fruits are elliptic to inverted egg-shaped, 0.8–1.5 mm (0.031–0.059 in) long, with 5 ribs, and hairless or with the adpressed puberulous twin-hairs as in the ovary. The pappus consists of white, short barbed bristles that are united at their base and are about a quarter of the length of the fruit and are not shed. The few to many, yellow, disc florets are functionally male, with a funnel-shaped perianth tube that splits into five spreading lobes. The anthers blunt at their base and have oval appendages at their tips. The five filaments with swollen bases and a narrow neck form a collar.The ovary is narrowly ellipsoid and hairless and is topped by a simple style with a cone-shaped tip and without pappus.

=== Differences between the species ===
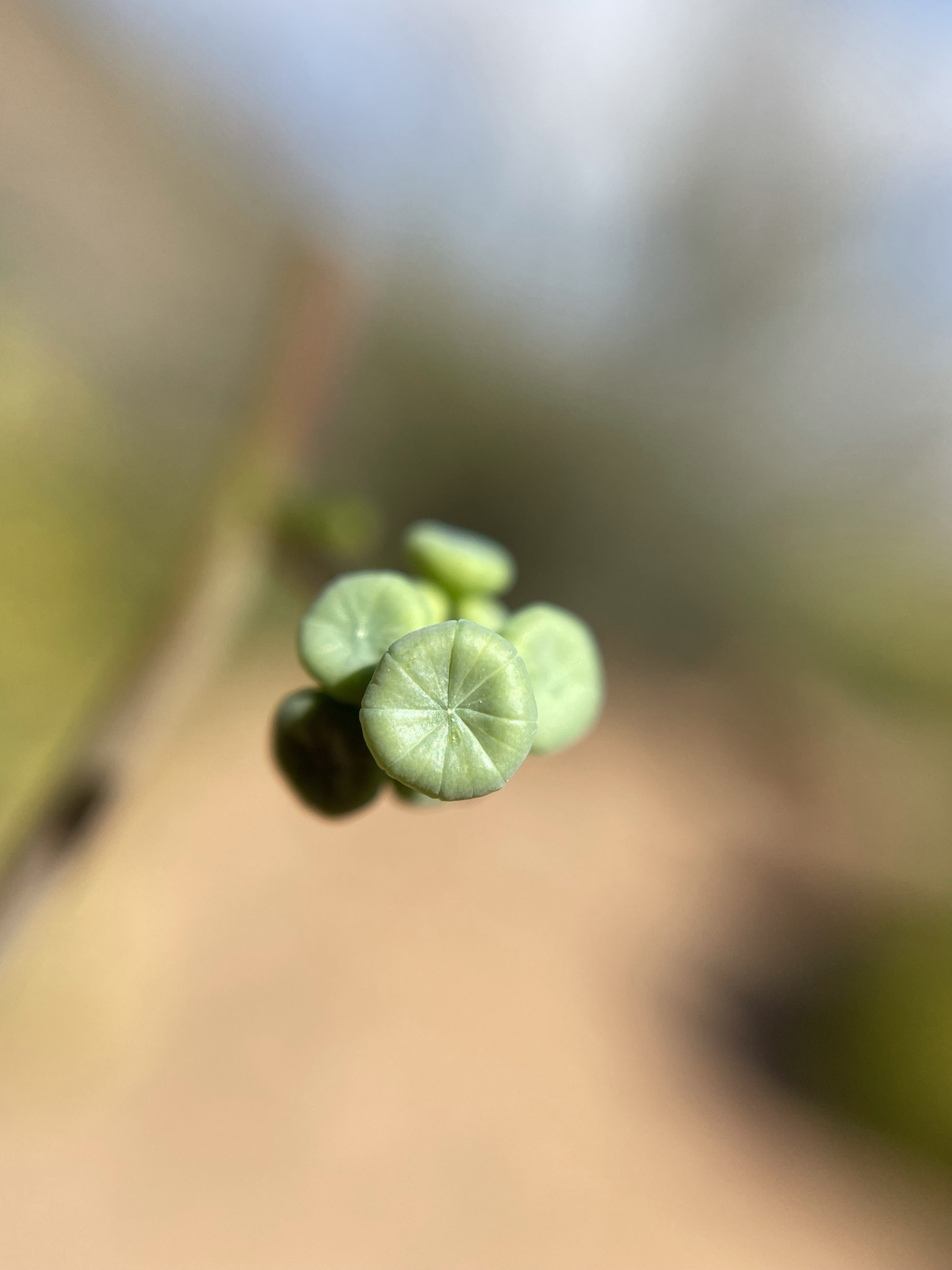
flowerhead bud of Gymnodiscus linearifolius showing eight involucral bracts

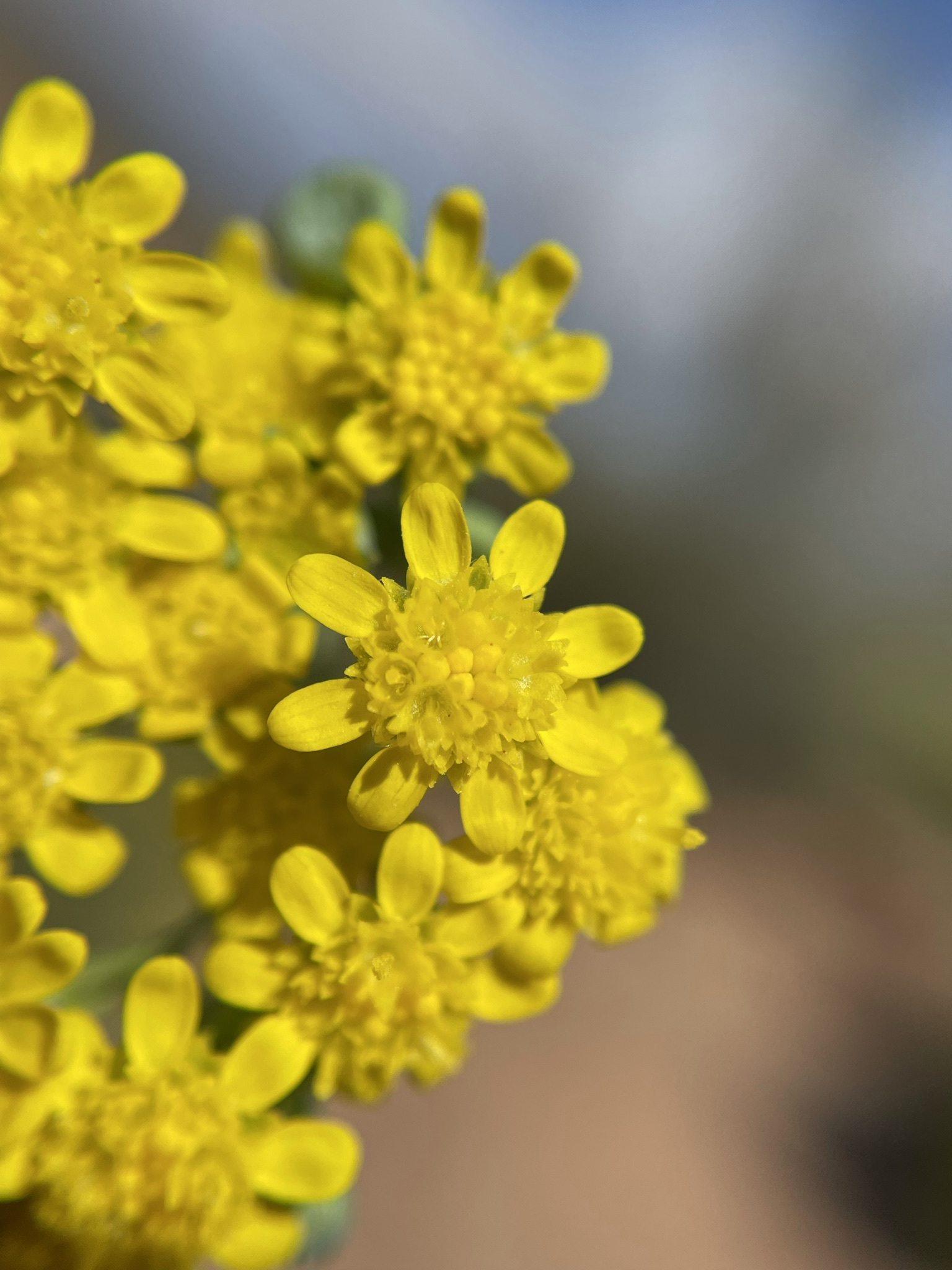
flowerhead of Gymnodiscus linearifolius

Gymnodiscus capillaris has green, leathery, inverted egg- to spatula-shaped, or lobed, lyre-shaped leaves that often have a purple underside. The five ray florets have a short tube of 0.3–0.5 mm (0.012–0.020 in) long, and the style branches clearly above the entrance to the perianth tube. The fruits of the ray florets are covered in soft, fine, adpressed twin hairs. There are 12-13 disc florets. Gymnodiscus linearifolius on the other hand has bluish succulent, cylindrical leaves. The eight or nine ray florets in this species have perianth tubes of 1.0–1.5 mm (0.039–0.059 in), while the style branches just below the mouth of the perianth tube. The fruits of the ray florets are hairless. There may be up to 30 disc florets.

=== Differences with Othonna ===
Geelkruid differs from bobbejaankool (Othonna) in lacking pappus in its disc florets, in having only very short pappus of up to 2 mm (0.079 in) long in its ray florets, a character it shares with the new genus Crassothonna, while this is much longer, usually 5–15 mm (0.20–0.59 in), in species of Othonna. In addition, both species of geelkruid are annuals with their leaves in a rosette.

== Taxonomy ==
Geelkruid was first scientifically described by Carl Linnaeus the Younger in 1782 and he called it Othonna capillaris. The German botanist Christian Friedrich Lessing in 1831 considered the species sufficiently different to be in another genus which he called Gymnodiscus and made the new combination Gymnodiscus capillaris. In 1838, the French botanist Augustin Pyramus de Candolle described Gymnodiscus linearifolius.

== Distribution, ecology and conservation ==
Gymnodiscus capillaris is a wide-spread species that can be found in both the Western Cape and Northern Cape provinces of South Africa, between the Cape Peninsula in the west and Mosselbay in the east, to Steinkopf in the north. Gymnodiscus linearifolius has a more limited distribution occurring in Namaqualand which is part of the Northern Cape province of South Africa between Springbok, Kamieskroon and Aggeneys. Both species generally occur on sandy soil on flatlands or gentile slopes. The continued survival of both species is of least concern according to the Redlist of South African Plants.
