= Palfuria retusa =

Scientific classification
- Kingdom: Animalia
- Phylum: Arthropoda
- Subphylum: Chelicerata
- Class: Arachnida
- Order: Araneae
- Infraorder: Araneomorphae
- Family: Zodariidae
- Genus: Palfuria
- Species: P. retusa

Binomial name
- Palfuria retusa Simon, 1910

Species of spider

Palfuria retusa is a species of spider in the family Zodariidae. It is the type species of the genus Palfuria and is found in Namibia and South Africa.

== Distribution ==
Palfuria retusa occurs in southern Africa, with records from Namibia and the Northern Cape province of South Africa. South African localities include Steinkopf, Richtersveld Transfrontier National Park, and Kgalagadi Transfrontier Park.

== Habitat ==
The species is a very small, rare ground dweller that inhabits the Desert and Succulent Karoo biomes at altitudes ranging from 250 to 988 metres above sea level. It has been collected using pitfall traps.

== Description ==
Palfuria retusa is known from a subadult female holotype. The subadult female has a total length of 1.98 mm. The carapace is pale brown with a dark margin, and the chelicerae are pale brown. The sternum is pale yellow, and legs are pale yellow with dark stripes on the femora. The carapace is finely granulated with a raised cephalic area that does not slant back. The opisthosoma has a pale sepia dorsum with pale stripes posteriorly.

== Conservation ==
The species is listed as Data Deficient due to taxonomic reasons. It is protected in Richtersveld Transfrontier National Park and Kgalagadi Transfrontier Park. More sampling is needed to collect adult and male specimens.
