= Richtersveld Local Municipality elections =

The Richtersveld Local Municipality council consists of eleven members elected by mixed-member proportional representation. Six councillors are elected by first-past-the-post voting in six wards, while the remaining five are chosen from party lists so that the total number of party representatives is proportional to the number of votes received. In the election of 1 November 2021 the African National Congress (ANC) won a majority of six seats.

== Results ==
The following table shows the composition of the council after past elections.

Event	ANC	DA	Other	Total
2000 election	5	3	—	8
2006 election	5	1	2	8
2011 election	5	3	0	8
2016 election	4	3	0	7
2021 election	6	3	2	11

== December 2000 election ==
The following table shows the results of the 2000 election.

Party	Ward			List			Total seats
Party	Votes	%	Seats	Votes	%	Seats	Total seats
African National Congress	1,935	67.21	4	1,969	68.13	1	5
Democratic Alliance	944	32.79	0	921	31.87	3	3
Total	2,879	100.00	4	2,890	100.00	4	8
Valid votes	2,879	97.30		2,890	97.80		
Invalid/blank votes	80	2.70		65	2.20		
Total votes	2,959	100.00		2,955	100.00		
Registered voters/turnout	6,131	48.26		6,131	48.20		

== March 2006 election ==
The following table shows the results of the 2006 election.

Party	Ward			List			Total seats
Party	Votes	%	Seats	Votes	%	Seats	Total seats
African National Congress	2,078	62.68	4	2,095	62.99	1	5
Independent Democrats	546	16.47	0	601	18.07	2	2
Democratic Alliance	528	15.93	0	523	15.72	1	1
African Christian Democratic Party	89	2.68	0	107	3.22	0	0
Independent candidates	74	2.23	0				0
Total	3,315	100.00	4	3,326	100.00	4	8
Valid votes	3,315	98.11		3,326	98.43		
Invalid/blank votes	64	1.89		53	1.57		
Total votes	3,379	100.00		3,379	100.00		
Registered voters/turnout	6,929	48.77		6,929	48.77		

== May 2011 election ==
The following table shows the results of the 2011 election.

Party	Ward			List			Total seats
Party	Votes	%	Seats	Votes	%	Seats	Total seats
African National Congress	2,552	57.62	4	2,666	60.10	1	5
Democratic Alliance	1,331	30.05	0	1,464	33.00	3	3
Congress of the People	293	6.62	0	306	6.90	0	0
Independent candidates	253	5.71	0				0
Total	4,429	100.00	4	4,436	100.00	4	8
Valid votes	4,429	98.93		4,436	98.93		
Invalid/blank votes	48	1.07		48	1.07		
Total votes	4,477	100.00		4,484	100.00		
Registered voters/turnout	7,096	63.09		7,096	63.19		

== August 2016 election ==
The following table shows the results of the 2016 election.

Party	Ward			List			Total seats
Party	Votes	%	Seats	Votes	%	Seats	Total seats
African National Congress	2,297	52.51	2	2,317	52.90	2	4
Democratic Alliance	2,030	46.41	2	2,021	46.14	1	3
Economic Freedom Fighters	47	1.07	0	42	0.96	0	0
Total	4,374	100.00	4	4,380	100.00	3	7
Valid votes	4,374	98.85		4,380	98.94		
Invalid/blank votes	51	1.15		47	1.06		
Total votes	4,425	100.00		4,427	100.00		
Registered voters/turnout	7,374	60.01		7,374	60.04		

== November 2021 election ==
The following table shows the results of the 2021 election.

Party	Ward			List			Total seats
Party	Votes	%	Seats	Votes	%	Seats	Total seats
African National Congress	2,066	46.54	6	2,116	48.05	0	6
Democratic Alliance	1,129	25.43	0	1,379	31.31	3	3
Economic Freedom Fighters	324	7.30	0	329	7.47	1	1
Independent candidates	522	11.76	0				0
National Economic Fighters	143	3.22	0	293	6.65	1	1
Namakwa Civic Movement	147	3.31	0	193	4.38	0	0
Freedom Front Plus	108	2.43	0	94	2.13	0	0
Total	4,439	100.00	6	4,404	100.00	5	11
Valid votes	4,439	98.97		4,404	99.28		
Invalid/blank votes	46	1.03		32	0.72		
Total votes	4,485	100.00		4,436	100.00		
Registered voters/turnout	7,420	60.44		7,420	59.78		
