= Hertia =

Hertia may refer to:

- Hertia (plant), a genus of plants in the family Asteraceae
- Hertia, a character in Sonic X
