= Babiana gariepensis =

Scientific classification
- Kingdom: Plantae
- Clade: Tracheophytes
- Clade: Angiosperms
- Clade: Monocots
- Order: Asparagales
- Family: Iridaceae
- Genus: Babiana
- Species: B. gariepens

Binomial name
- Babiana gariepens Goldblatt & J.C.Manning

Species of flowering plant

Babiana gariepensis is a species of geophytic, perennial flowering plant in the family Iridaceae. It is part of the fynbos and Succulent Karoo. The species is native to the Northern Cape and Namibia. It occurs in the Richtersveld, from the southwestern part of Namibia, across the Orange River to Steinkopf.
