= Kamiesberg Local Municipality elections =

The Kamiesberg Local Municipality council consists of eleven members elected by mixed-member proportional representation. Six councillors are elected by first-past-the-post voting in six wards, while the remaining five are chosen from party lists so that the total number of party representatives is proportional to the number of votes received. In the election of 1 November 2021 the African National Congress (ANC) won a majority of six seats.

== Results ==
The following table shows the composition of the council after past elections.

| Event | ANC | DA | Other | Total |
|---|---|---|---|---|
| 2000 election | 4 | 3 | 0 | 7 |
| 2006 election | 4 | 1 | 2 | 7 |
| 2011 election | 4 | 2 | 1 | 7 |
| 2016 election | 4 | 2 | 1 | 7 |
| 2021 election | 6 | 3 | 2 | 11 |

== December 2000 election ==
The following table shows the results of the 2000 election.

| Party | Ward | | | List | | | Total seats |
| Party | Votes | % | Seats | Votes | % | Seats | Total seats |
|---|---|---|---|---|---|---|---|
| African National Congress | 2,176 | 60.14 | 3 | 2,177 | 60.10 | 1 | 4 |
| Democratic Alliance | 1,375 | 38.00 | 1 | 1,445 | 39.90 | 2 | 3 |
| Independent candidates | 67 | 1.85 | 0 | | | | 0 |
| Total | 3,618 | 100.00 | 4 | 3,622 | 100.00 | 3 | 7 |
| Valid votes | 3,618 | 98.21 | | 3,622 | 98.32 | | |
| Invalid/blank votes | 66 | 1.79 | | 62 | 1.68 | | |
| Total votes | 3,684 | 100.00 | | 3,684 | 100.00 | | |
| Registered voters/turnout | 5,368 | 68.63 | | 5,368 | 68.63 | | |

== March 2006 election ==
The following table shows the results of the 2006 election.

| Party | Ward | | | List | | | Total seats |
| Party | Votes | % | Seats | Votes | % | Seats | Total seats |
|---|---|---|---|---|---|---|---|
| African National Congress | 2,111 | 55.33 | 4 | 2,135 | 55.79 | 0 | 4 |
| Independent Democrats | 1,376 | 36.07 | 0 | 1,334 | 34.86 | 2 | 2 |
| Democratic Alliance | 328 | 8.60 | 0 | 358 | 9.35 | 1 | 1 |
| Total | 3,815 | 100.00 | 4 | 3,827 | 100.00 | 3 | 7 |
| Valid votes | 3,815 | 98.58 | | 3,827 | 98.86 | | |
| Invalid/blank votes | 55 | 1.42 | | 44 | 1.14 | | |
| Total votes | 3,870 | 100.00 | | 3,871 | 100.00 | | |
| Registered voters/turnout | 6,494 | 59.59 | | 6,494 | 59.61 | | |

== May 2011 election ==
The following table shows the results of the 2011 election.

| Party | Ward | | | List | | | Total seats |
| Party | Votes | % | Seats | Votes | % | Seats | Total seats |
|---|---|---|---|---|---|---|---|
| African National Congress | 2,701 | 54.26 | 2 | 2,705 | 54.40 | 2 | 4 |
| Democratic Alliance | 1,705 | 34.25 | 2 | 1,719 | 34.57 | 0 | 2 |
| Congress of the People | 572 | 11.49 | 0 | 548 | 11.02 | 1 | 1 |
| Total | 4,978 | 100.00 | 4 | 4,972 | 100.00 | 3 | 7 |
| Valid votes | 4,978 | 98.57 | | 4,972 | 98.57 | | |
| Invalid/blank votes | 72 | 1.43 | | 72 | 1.43 | | |
| Total votes | 5,050 | 100.00 | | 5,044 | 100.00 | | |
| Registered voters/turnout | 6,938 | 72.79 | | 6,938 | 72.70 | | |

== August 2016 election ==
The following table shows the results of the 2016 election.

| Party | Ward | | | List | | | Total seats |
| Party | Votes | % | Seats | Votes | % | Seats | Total seats |
|---|---|---|---|---|---|---|---|
| African National Congress | 3,086 | 62.60 | 4 | 3,083 | 62.43 | 0 | 4 |
| Democratic Alliance | 1,379 | 27.97 | 0 | 1,387 | 28.09 | 2 | 2 |
| Economic Freedom Fighters | 365 | 7.40 | 0 | 350 | 7.09 | 1 | 1 |
| Freedom Front Plus | 68 | 1.38 | 0 | 73 | 1.48 | 0 | 0 |
| Congress of the People | 32 | 0.65 | 0 | 45 | 0.91 | 0 | 0 |
| Total | 4,930 | 100.00 | 4 | 4,938 | 100.00 | 3 | 7 |
| Valid votes | 4,930 | 99.24 | | 4,938 | 99.24 | | |
| Invalid/blank votes | 38 | 0.76 | | 38 | 0.76 | | |
| Total votes | 4,968 | 100.00 | | 4,976 | 100.00 | | |
| Registered voters/turnout | 7,335 | 67.73 | | 7,335 | 67.84 | | |

== November 2021 election ==
The following table shows the results of the 2021 election.

| Party | Ward | | | List | | | Total seats |
| Party | Votes | % | Seats | Votes | % | Seats | Total seats |
|---|---|---|---|---|---|---|---|
| African National Congress | 2,695 | 52.32 | 5 | 2,712 | 52.58 | 1 | 6 |
| Democratic Alliance | 1,208 | 23.45 | 1 | 1,238 | 24.00 | 2 | 3 |
| National Economic Fighters | 427 | 8.29 | 0 | 430 | 8.34 | 1 | 1 |
| Namakwa Civic Movement | 375 | 7.28 | 0 | 397 | 7.70 | 1 | 1 |
| Economic Freedom Fighters | 271 | 5.26 | 0 | 259 | 5.02 | 0 | 0 |
| Freedom Front Plus | 126 | 2.45 | 0 | 122 | 2.37 | 0 | 0 |
| Patriotic Alliance | 40 | 0.78 | 0 | | | | 0 |
| Independent candidates | 9 | 0.17 | 0 | | | | 0 |
| Total | 5,151 | 100.00 | 6 | 5,158 | 100.00 | 5 | 11 |
| Valid votes | 5,151 | 99.08 | | 5,158 | 99.12 | | |
| Invalid/blank votes | 48 | 0.92 | | 46 | 0.88 | | |
| Total votes | 5,199 | 100.00 | | 5,204 | 100.00 | | |
| Registered voters/turnout | 7,484 | 69.47 | | 7,484 | 69.54 | | |
