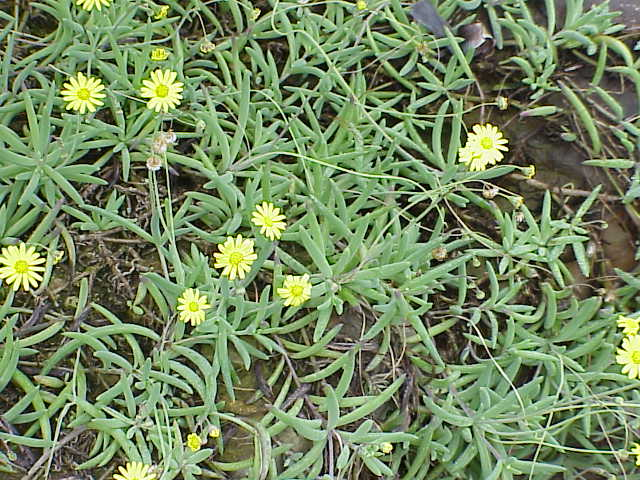

Scientific classification
- Kingdom: Plantae
- Clade: Tracheophytes
- Clade: Angiosperms
- Clade: Eudicots
- Clade: Asterids
- Order: Asterales
- Family: Asteraceae
- Genus: Crassothonna
- Species: C. capensis

Binomial name
- Crassothonna capensis (L.H.Bailey) B.Nord.

Synonyms
- Othonna capensis L.H.Bailey; Othonna crassifolia Harv., nom. illeg.; Othonna filicaulis Eckl. ex Harv.

= Crassothonna capensis =

Species of flowering plant

Crassothonna capensis (previously Othonna capensis), also known as little pickles (USA), ruby necklace (Australia), Cape aster, Cape Othonna, and Bobbejaankool (Afrikaans), is a species of the genus Crassothonna previously (Othonna) in the family Asteraceae, and is a native of the Eastern Cape of South Africa. It is a native highveld species that originates from the southern Drakensberg region.

== Description ==
This species is a low-growing, succulent, spreading ground cover with finger-like, blue-grey leaves, spirally arranged, which become tipped with maroon in dry conditions. It has yellow daisy-like flowers on long, slender stems.

== Taxonomy ==
It was described by L.H. Bailey in 1901 and published in the Cyclopedia of American Horticulture replacing the original description and name from 1865 Othonna crassifolia Harv. In turn, the genus was changed from Othonna by Nordenstam et al., who erected the new genus Crassothonna for the clade of Othonna species O. sedifolia, O. alba and O. capensis. The new name for this species is therefore Crassothonna capensis (L.H.Bailey) B.Nord.

== Distribution and habitat ==
This species is endemic to the Eastern Cape Province in semi-arid Karoo scrub and dry, rocky flats, often in the partial protection of surrounding vegetation or rocks.

== Cultivation ==
In cultivation, the species is commonly called little pickles in the USA or ruby necklace in Australia and is used for rockeries, terrariums, indoor hanging pots and outside xeriscaping.
