= Henkries =

- Location within Northern Cape Location within South Africa
- Coordinates: 28.957°S 18.105°E
- Country: South Africa
- Province: Northern Cape
- District: Namakwa
- Municipality: Nama Khoi
- Time zone: UTC+2 (SAST)

Henkries is a village in Nama Khoi, Northern Cape, South Africa, 13 km west of Goodhouse.
