= Palfuria gladiator =

Scientific classification
- Kingdom: Animalia
- Phylum: Arthropoda
- Subphylum: Chelicerata
- Class: Arachnida
- Order: Araneae
- Infraorder: Araneomorphae
- Family: Zodariidae
- Genus: Palfuria
- Species: P. gladiator

Binomial name
- Palfuria gladiator Szüts & Jocqué, 2001

Species of spider

Palfuria gladiator is a spider species of the family Zodariidae.

== Etymology ==
The epithet refers to the shape of the male carapace and the big tarsal claw on the male palp.

== Distribution ==
P. gladiator is only known from Namibia.
