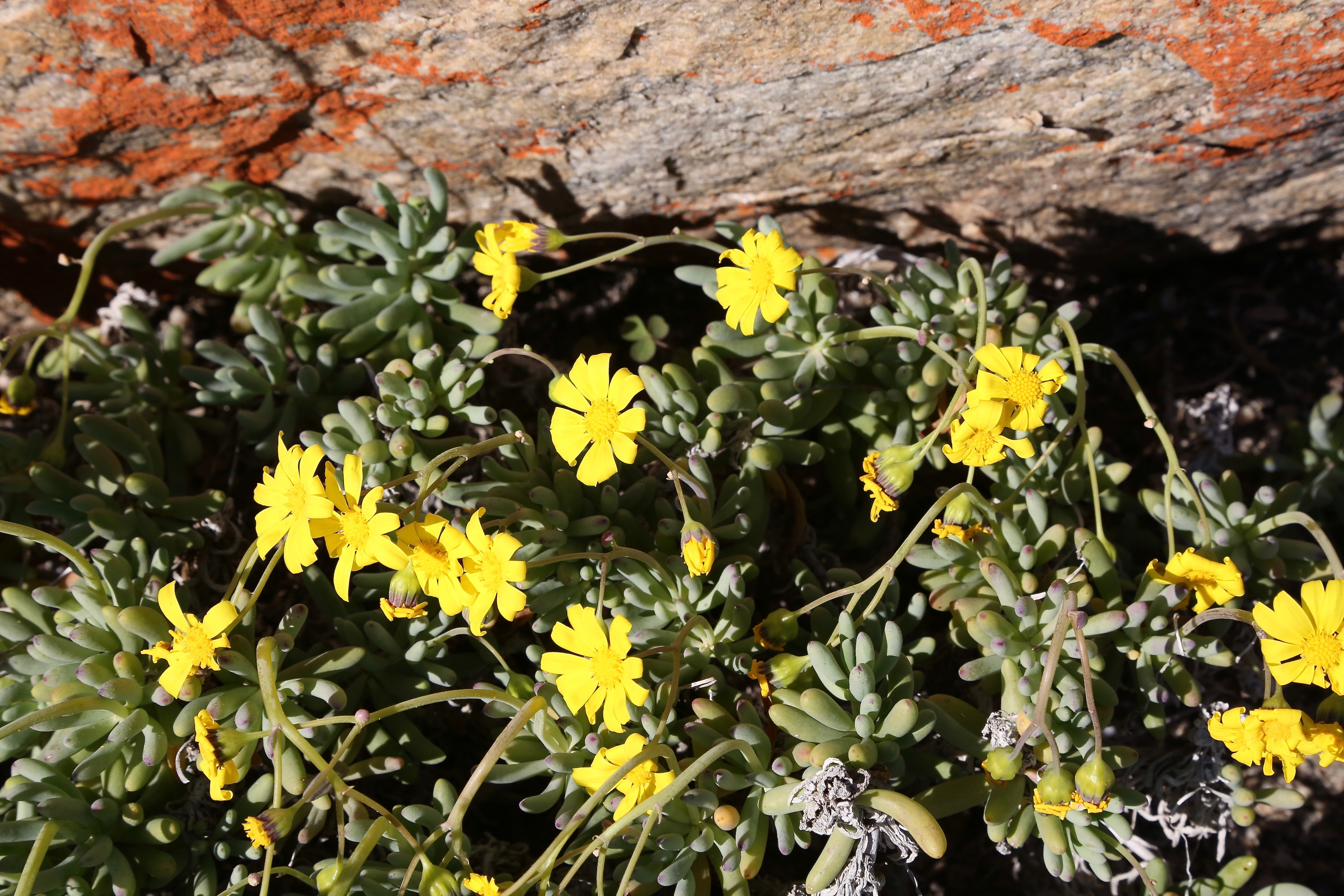
- Crassothonna cylindrica (Asteraceae).jpg

Scientific classification
- Kingdom: Plantae
- Clade: Tracheophytes
- Clade: Angiosperms
- Clade: Eudicots
- Clade: Asterids
- Order: Asterales
- Family: Asteraceae
- Subfamily: Asteroideae
- Tribe: Senecioneae
- Genus: Crassothonna; B.Nord.

= Crassothonna =

Genus of flowering plants

Crassothonna is a genus of flowering plants belonging to the family Asteraceae. The species assigned to Crassothonna are hairless herbaceous or woody plants with alternate, simple, cylindrical to globose, succulent, green to bluish or greyish leaves. The flowerheads may consist of only yellow disc florets or combine central yellow disc florets with yellow or in one species white ray florets around the margin. The central florets are functionally male with the style tip conical. The marginal florets set seed and the tip of the style is slightly forked.

== Description ==
The species assigned to the genus Crassothonna are hairless perennial herbs, shrublets or shrubs with little- to much-branched, thin or thick cylindrical stems that are fleshy and bottle-shaped in some species. The simple, green, glaucous, frosted or minutely papillose, distinctly succulent, more or less circular, egg-, or sausage-shaped leaves. The leaves are seated or on a short leaf stalk and alternately set along the stem. The leaf tip is rounded or blunt, in some species the midrib extends in a small point beyond the leaf. The flowerheads sit individually or in a few- to many headed corymb at the ending of the stems. The flowerheads are on a thin, short or long stalk with a single or few very small bracts. The flowerheads are enclosed by a single row of five to eight soft, herbaceous bracts, each with 3-5 veins and thin and transparent margins, that are merged at their base and form a bell-shaped involucre. In some species consist solely of disc florets, while in others central disc florets are encircled by ray florets. The central florets are functionally male with a conical style tip, the marginal flowers are functionally bisexual and the style tip is slightly forked. The base of the flowerhead on which the individual florets grow is finely pitted, flat or a bit convex without hairs or scales. The yellow or rarely white corolla of the ray florets is shortly cylindrical tube at its base, above which it opens into a strap-shaped, sometimes tube-shaped tongue, or the tongue is absent. The style of the ray florets is forked, have an abruptly transverse end or are blunt, with short hairs just below the tip that sweep up the pollen. The inferior, one seeded fruits are spindle- to inversely egg-shaped 2–5 mm (0.079–0.197 in) long, 1–3 mm (0.039–0.118 in) wide, ribbed or veined, hairless, are covered in very fine hairs or a dense layer of silvery-white hairs pressed against the surface of the fruit that create a slimy layer when wet. In Asteraceae, the calyx is called pappus and in many species consist of bristle-like hairs. In Crassothonna species these bristles are numerous, minutely barbed, white in colour, and may not be firmly fixed and easily lost. The central disc florets are functionally male, in which case the style is unforked and have a conical tip. In species that lack ray florets, the outer disc floret are functionally bisexual, the styles are forked with conical or flat-topped branches and the stigma on the inside of the style branches. Just below the tip are short hairs that have collected the pollen from the anthers before the bud opened. The corolla is tube to bell-shaped, ends in five lobes with a sometimes barely discernible midvein. The five anthers that are fused to form a hollow tube through which the style is pushed out when the floret opens is blunt at their base, without tail-like extensions, but the appendages at the tip of the anther are flat and oval to oblong. The five filaments that connect the anthers to the corolla tube form a collar, are swollen at their base and taper to a narrow neck. Only the fruits of fertilised, functionally bisexual florets may develop.

Most species have ten pair of homologous chromosomes (2n=20), but Crassothonna reichingeri is a hexaploid (6n=60). The karyology of Crassothonna discoidea has not been determined thus far.

== Taxonomy ==
The genus Crassothonna was described by the Swedish botanist Rune Bertil Nordenstam in 2012. The species now assigned to Crassothonna were before regarded as a group within the large genus Othonna. These species can be distinguished by their succulent and cylindrical to globe-shaped leaves and the absence of tubers. DNA of two species have been demonstrated to be more akin to the small annuals belonging to the genus Gymnodiscus.

Species:

- Crassothonna agaatbergensis Swanepoel
- Crassothonna alba (Compton) B.Nord.
- Crassothonna cacalioides (L.f.) B.Nord.
- Crassothonna capensis (L.H.Bailey) B.Nord.
- Crassothonna clavifolia (Marloth) B.Nord.
- Crassothonna cylindrica (Lam.) B.Nord.
- Crassothonna discoidea (Oliv.) B.Nord.
- Crassothonna floribunda (Schltr.) B.Nord.
- Crassothonna opima (Merxm.) B.Nord.
- Crassothonna patula (Schltr.) B.Nord.
- Crassothonna protecta (Dinter) B.Nord.
- Crassothonna rechingeri (B.Nord.) B.Nord.
- Crassothonna sedifolia (DC.) B.Nord.
- Crassothonna sparsiflora (S.Moore) B.Nord.

== Distribution ==
Its native range is Southern Africa.

== Conservation ==
The continued survival of the species of Crassothonna is considered to be of least concern according to the Redlist of South African Plants except for Crassothonna clavifolia that is endangered and Crassothonna opima that is critically endangered.
