= Palfuria panner =

Scientific classification
- Kingdom: Animalia
- Phylum: Arthropoda
- Subphylum: Chelicerata
- Class: Arachnida
- Order: Araneae
- Infraorder: Araneomorphae
- Family: Zodariidae
- Genus: Palfuria
- Species: P. panner

Binomial name
- Palfuria panner Jocqué, 1991

Species of spider

Palfuria panner is a spider species of the family Zodariidae.

== Distribution ==
P. panner occurs in Namibia.
