= Buffelsrivier =

- Location within Northern Cape Location within South Africa
- Coordinates: 29.696°S 17.601°E
- Country: South Africa
- Province: Northern Cape
- District: Namakwa
- Municipality: Nama Khoi

Area
  - Total: 0.64 km^{2} (0.25 sq mi)

Population (2001)
  - Total: 1,123
  - Density: 1,800/km^{2} (4,500/sq mi)

Racial makeup (2001)
  - Coloured: 100.0%

First languages (2001)
  - Afrikaans: 100%
- Time zone: UTC+2 (SAST)
- PO box: 8251

Buffelsrivier is a town in Namakwa District Municipality in the Northern Cape province of South Africa.
