= Othonna purpurascens =

Scientific classification
- Kingdom: Plantae
- Clade: Tracheophytes
- Clade: Angiosperms
- Clade: Eudicots
- Clade: Asterids
- Order: Asterales
- Family: Asteraceae
- Genus: Othonna
- Species: O. purpurascens

Binomial name
- Othonna purpurascens Harv.

Species of plant

Othonna purpurascens is a species of flowering plant in the family Asteraceae. It is endemic to the Cape Provinces of South Africa.

== Description ==
This plant has a scrubby succulent stem. The leaves are flat and fleshy. They are smooth and covered with a whitish bloom, but the lower parts of the stems have woolly scars from dropping leaves. The two headed flowers are purplish in colour and the seeds that they produce are silky.

== Distribution and habitat ==
This species is known from Mastenberg in South Africa.
