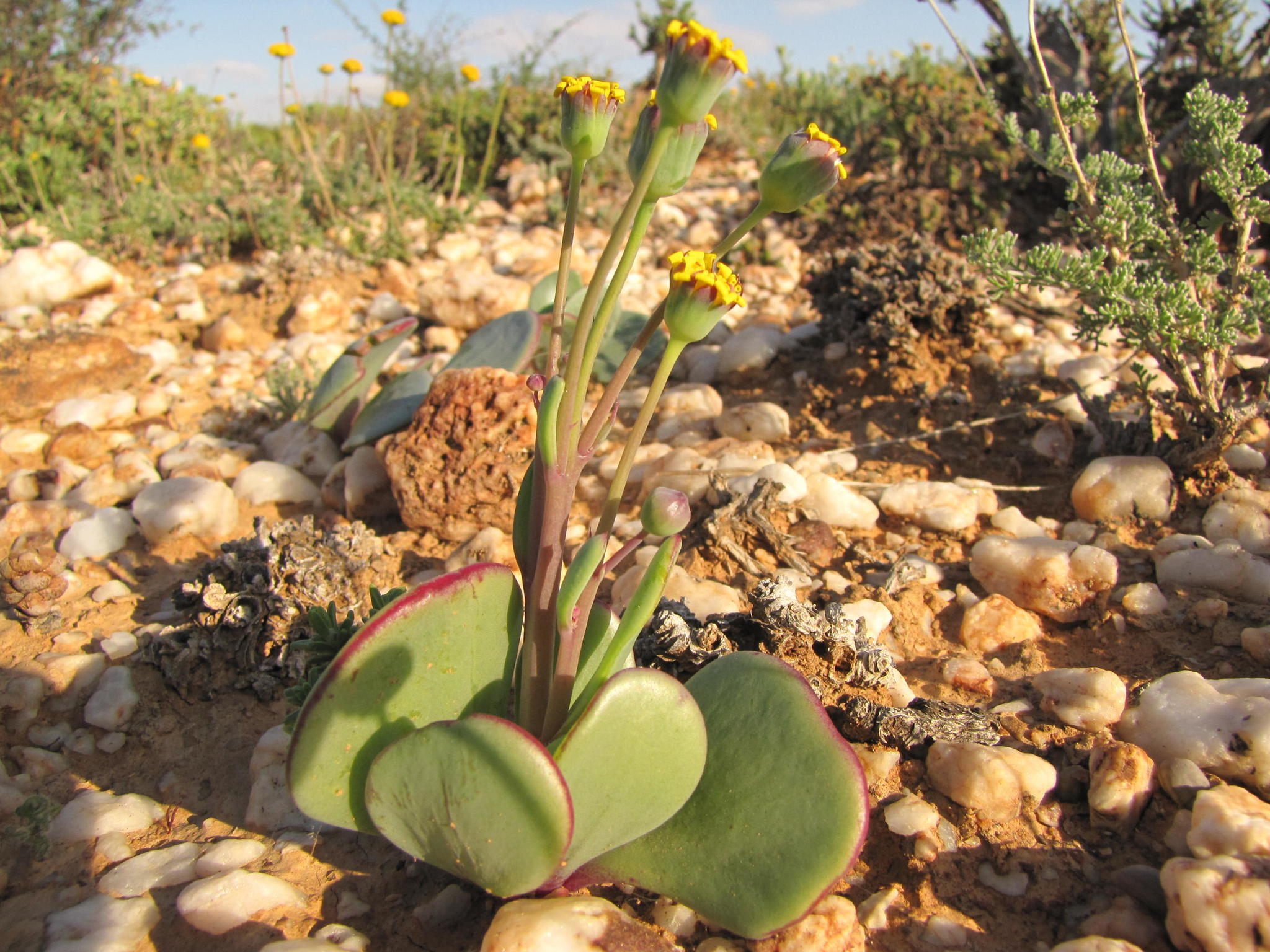

Scientific classification
- Kingdom: Plantae
- Clade: Embryophytes
- Clade: Tracheophytes
- Clade: Spermatophytes
- Clade: Angiosperms
- Clade: Eudicots
- Clade: Asterids
- Order: Asterales
- Family: Asteraceae
- Genus: Othonna
- Species: O. intermedia

Binomial name
- Othonna intermedia Compton

= Othonna intermedia =

Species of plant

Othonna intermedia is a species of plant from South Africa.

== Description ==
This tuberous geophyte has no stem or a short stem. It grows to be up to 150 cm (59 in) tall with a woolly crown. The leaves are concerntrated at the base of the plant. Up to three leafy bracts are found around the flower stems. The flowers are yellow.

== Distribution and habitat ==
This plant is known from the Northern Cape and Western Cape of South Africa. It has an area of occurrence of 6,914 km^{2} (2,670 sq mi), in which it is found at 15-20 locations. It is common on quartz patches in the Knersvlakte.

== Conservation ==
This species is considered to be near threatened by the South African National Biodiversity Institute. It is declining due to urbanisation, agriculture and mining in its habitat.
