= Palfuria helichrysorum =

Scientific classification
- Kingdom: Animalia
- Phylum: Arthropoda
- Subphylum: Chelicerata
- Class: Arachnida
- Order: Araneae
- Infraorder: Araneomorphae
- Family: Zodariidae
- Genus: Palfuria
- Species: P. helichrysorum

Binomial name
- Palfuria helichrysorum Szüts & Jocqué, 2001

Species of spider

Palfuria helichrysorum is a spider species of the family Zodariidae.

== Etymology ==
The species name is derived from the rosette bearing Asteraceae Helichrysum, which serves as a retreat for night active spiders.

== Distribution ==
P. helichrysorum occurs in Malawi.
