= Palfuria harpago =

Scientific classification
- Kingdom: Animalia
- Phylum: Arthropoda
- Subphylum: Chelicerata
- Class: Arachnida
- Order: Araneae
- Infraorder: Araneomorphae
- Family: Zodariidae
- Genus: Palfuria
- Species: P. harpago

Binomial name
- Palfuria harpago Szüts & Jocqué, 2001

Species of spider

Palfuria harpago is a spider species of the family Zodariidae.

== Etymology ==
The species name harpago means harpoon in Latin. It refers to the shape of the dorsal tibial apophysis as seen from the dorsolateral side.

== Distribution ==
P. harpago is only known from Ovamboland, Namibia.
