= Palfuria =

Scientific classification
- Kingdom: Animalia
- Phylum: Arthropoda
- Subphylum: Chelicerata
- Class: Arachnida
- Order: Araneae
- Infraorder: Araneomorphae
- Family: Zodariidae
- Genus: Palfuria; Simon, 1910

Species
- See text

Diversity
- 9 species

Genus of spiders

Palfuria is a spider genus of the family Zodariidae with nine described species from southern Africa.

== Distribution ==
Five species (P. retusa, P. spirembolus, P. gladiator, P. panner, P. harpago) are known from the southwestern part of the continent, the other species (P. gibbosa, P. helichrysorum, P. hirsuta, P. caputlari) from the eastern part. The last species is from as far north as northern Tanzania.

As in many other genera, there is a tendency for the embolus to increase in length. Both the most basal (Palfuria panner) and the most derived species (Palfuria spirembolus) are found in Namibia.

== Species ==
As of September 2025, this genus includes nine species:

- Palfuria caputlari Szűts & Jocqué, 2001 – Tanzania, South Africa
- Palfuria gibbosa (Lessert, 1936) – Mozambique
- Palfuria gladiator Szűts & Jocqué, 2001 – Namibia
- Palfuria harpago Szűts & Jocqué, 2001 – Namibia
- Palfuria helichrysorum Szűts & Jocqué, 2001 – Malawi
- Palfuria hirsuta Szűts & Jocqué, 2001 – Zambia
- Palfuria panner Jocqué, 1991 – Namibia
- Palfuria retusa Simon, 1910 – Namibia, South Africa (type species)
- Palfuria spirembolus Szűts & Jocqué, 2001 – Namibia, South Africa
