= Palfuria caputlari =

Hunchback Palfuria zodariid

Conservation status
- Least Concern (SANBI Red List)

Scientific classification
- Kingdom: Animalia
- Phylum: Arthropoda
- Subphylum: Chelicerata
- Class: Arachnida
- Order: Araneae
- Infraorder: Araneomorphae
- Family: Zodariidae
- Genus: Palfuria
- Species: P. caputlari

Binomial name
- Palfuria caputlari Szűts & Jocqué, 2001

Species of spider

Palfuria caputlari is a species of spider in the family Zodariidae. It is found in Tanzania and South Africa and is commonly known as the Hunchback Palfuria zodariid.

== Etymology ==
The epithet is composed of two Latin nouns: caput = "head" and lari from larus = "gull". It refers to the shape of the median apophysis as seen from the side.

== Distribution ==
Palfuria caputlari has been recorded from Tanzania and the Limpopo province of South Africa, including localities in the Vhembe Biosphere Reserve and Nwanedi Game Reserve.

== Habitat ==
The species is a very small ground dweller that inhabits the Savanna biome at altitudes ranging from 622 to 763 metres above sea level. It has been collected using pitfall traps.

== Description ==
Palfuria caputlari is easily recognized by the strongly elevated cephalic part of the carapace and the presence of dorsolateral circumferential folds on the opisthosoma.

Males have a total length of 2.24 mm while females measure 2.44 mm. The carapace is medium to dark brown with some darker striae in the thoracic area and a dark brown cephalic lobe with paler spots. Legs are paler, with coxae being pale yellow and femora dark brown. The opisthosoma has a dark sepia dorsum with yellow folds contrasting with the pale yellow venter.

== Conservation ==
The species is listed as Least Concern by the South African National Biodiversity Institute due to its wide geographical range in Africa. It is protected in Nwanedi Game Reserve.
