= Khâi-Ma Local Municipality =

Khâi-Ma
- Local municipality
- Seal

- Location in the Northern Cape
- Coordinates: 29°30′S 19°15′E
- Country: South Africa
- Province: Northern Cape
- District: Namakwa
- Seat: Pofadder
- Wards: 6

Government
  - Type: Municipal council
  - Mayor: Lindie Bruintjies-Groenewald

Area
  - Total: 16,628 km^{2} (6,420 sq mi)

Population (2022)
  - Total: 8,510
  - Density: 0.512/km^{2} (1.33/sq mi)

Racial makeup (2022)
  - Black African: 8.9%
  - Coloured: 85.6%
  - Indian/Asian: 0.6%
  - White: 4.7%

First languages (2011)
  - Afrikaans: 83.3%
  - Tswana: 10.9%
  - Xhosa: 2.2%
  - English: 1.2%
  - Other: 2.4%
- Time zone: UTC+2 (SAST)
- Municipal code: NC067

Khâi-Ma Municipality (Afrikaans: Khâi-Ma Munisipaliteit; Tswana: Mmasepala wa Khâi-Ma) is a local municipality within the Namakwa District Municipality, in the Northern Cape province of South Africa. Khâi-Ma is a Khoekhoe word meaning "to stand up".

== Main places ==
The 2011 census divided the municipality into the following main places:

Place	Code	Area (km^{2})	Population
Aggeneys	368006	205.7	2,262
Onseepkans	368001	27.7	2,090
Pella	368004	477.8	2,470
Pofadder	368005	162.1	3,287
Witbank	368003	0.4	210
Remainder	368002	15,754.2	2,148
Total		16,628.0	12,465

== Demographics ==
According to the 2022 South African census, the population of the municipality decreased to 8,510 people from 12,446 in 2011. Of those, 85.6% identified as "Coloured," 8.9% as "Black African," and 4.7% as "White."

== Politics ==
The municipal council consists of eleven members elected by mixed-member proportional representation. Six councillors are elected by first-past-the-post voting in six wards, while the remaining five are chosen from party lists so that the total number of party representatives is proportional to the number of votes received. In the election of 1 November 2021 the African National Congress (ANC) won a majority of six seats on the council. The following table shows the results of the election.

Khâi-Ma local election, 1 November 2021
Party	Votes				Seats		
Party	Ward	List	Total	%	Ward	List	Total
African National Congress	2,199	2,204	4,403	50.5%	6	0	6
Namakwa Civic Movement	820	889	1,709	19.6%	0	2	2
Democratic Alliance	512	507	1,019	11.7%	0	1	1
Economic Freedom Fighters	272	275	547	6.3%	0	1	1
Congress of the People	255	247	502	5.8%	0	1	1
Freedom Front Plus	147	143	290	3.3%	0	0	0
National Economic Fighters	52	61	113	1.3%	0	0	0
Independent candidates	89	–	89	1.0%	0	–	0
African Transformation Movement	11	19	30	0.3%	0	0	0
South African Royal Kingdoms Organization	4	5	9	0.1%	0	0	0
Total	4,361	4,350	8,711		6	5	11
Valid votes	4,361	4,350	8,711	98.5%			
Spoilt votes	57	74	131	1.5%			
Total votes cast	4,418	4,424	8,842				
Voter turnout	4,430						
Registered voters	7,799						
Turnout percentage	56.8%						
