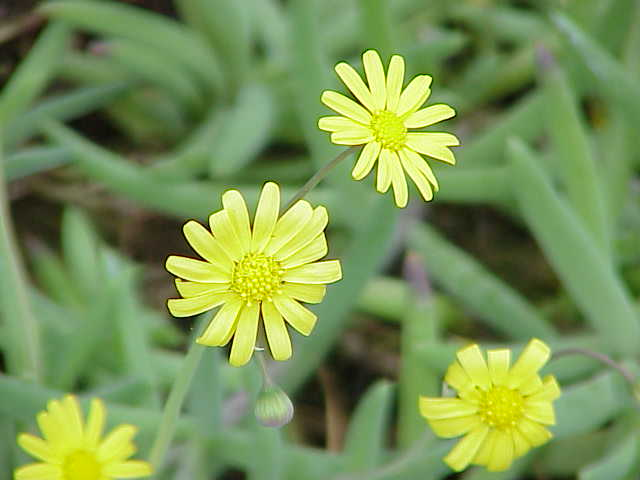
- Othonna capensis

Scientific classification
- Kingdom: Plantae
- Clade: Tracheophytes
- Clade: Angiosperms
- Clade: Eudicots
- Clade: Asterids
- Order: Asterales
- Family: Asteraceae
- Subfamily: Asteroideae
- Tribe: Senecioneae
- Genus: Othonna; L. (1753)

Type species
- Othonna coronopifolia L.

Synonyms
- Doria Thunb.; Ceradia Lindl.; Calthoides B.Juss. ex DC.; Aristotela Adanson

= Othonna =

Genus of plants

Othonna is a genus of approximately 90 species of succulent or subsucculent perennial herbs or shrubs, with its center of diversity in the Greater Cape Floristic Region (GCFR) of South Africa but some species' ranges include southern Namibia, Angola, and Zimbabwe. The genus was established by Linnaeus in 1753 containing 14 species, however, of those original species, only four are still retained in Othonna, while the others have been transferred to different genera including Cineraria, Euryops, Hertia, Ligularia, Senecio, and Tephroseris. The genus Othonnna is known to be monophyletic. In 2012, a new genus Crassothonna B. Nord. was erected with 13 species transferred from Othonna. A complete modern taxonomic treatment of the genus is being undertaken by the Compton Herbarium and the South African National Biodiversity Institute. The first part, a revision of the Othonnna bulbosa group (those species that are geophytic with an aerial stem), was published in 2019.

The name Othonna is derived from the Ancient Greek ὄθοννα and the Latin othone, which is a linen cloth or napkin, in allusion to the downy covering of some of the earlier known species.

Several species in the Othonna and Crassothonna are commonly called bobbejaankool in Afrikaans which translates to baboon cress or baboon cabbages.

Species in the Othonna bulbosa group

- Othonna bulbosa
- Othonna cakilefolia
- Othonna cuneata
- Othonna hederifolia
- Othonna heterophylla
- Othonna intermedia
- Othonna lilacina
- Othonna lyrata
- Othonna nigromontana
- Othonna oleracea
- Othonna petiolaris
- Othonna pinnata
- Othonna rosea
- Othonna rotundiloba
- Othonna sinuata
- Othonna stenophylla
- Othonna tephrosioides
- Othonna perfoliata
- Othonna rufibarbis
- Othonna undulosa
- Othonna digitata
- Othonna gymnodiscus
- Othonna linearifolia
- Othonna revoluta

Species

- Othonna arborescens
- Othonna arbuscula
- Othonna armiana
- Othonna auriculifolia
- Othonna bulbosa
- Othonna burttii
- Othonna cacalioides
- Othonna cakilefolia
- Othonna chromochaeta
- Othonna ciliata
- Othonna coronopifolia
- Othonna cremnophila
- Othonna cuneata
- Othonna cyclophylla
- Othonna daucifolia
- Othonna dentata
- Othonna digitata
- Othonna divaricata
- Othonna diversifolia
- Othonna eriocarpa
- Othonna euphorbioides
- Othonna frutescens
- Othonna furcata
- Othonna graveolens
- Othonna gymnodiscus
- Othonna hallii
- Othonna hederifolia
- Othonna herrei
- Othonna heterophylla
- Othonna humilis
- Othonna intermedia
- Othonna lasiocarpa
- Othonna lepidocaulis
- Othonna leptodactyla
- Othonna lineariifolia
- Othonna lobata
- Othonna lyrata
- Othonna macrophylla
- Othonna macrosperma
- Othonna membranifolia
- Othonna mucronata
- Othonna multicaulis
- Othonna natalensis
- Othonna obtusiloba
- Othonna oleracea
- Othonna opima
- Othonna osteospermoides
- Othonna ovalifolia
- Othonna pachypoda
- Othonna papaveroides
- Othonna parviflora
- Othonna pavelkae
- Othonna pavonia
- Othonna perfoliata
- Othonna petiolaris
- Othonna pinnata
- Othonna pluridentata
- Othonna primulina
- Othonna pteronioides
- Othonna purpurascens
- Othonna pygmaea
- Othonna quercifolia
- Othonna quinquedentata
- Othonna quinqueradiata
- Othonna ramulosa
- Othonna reticulata
- Othonna retrofracta
- Othonna retrorsa
- Othonna rhamnoides
- Othonna rosea
- Othonna rotundifolia
- Othonna rufibarbis
- Othonna sonchifolia
- Othonna spinescens
- Othonna stenophylla
- Othonna taraxacoides
- Othonna tephrosioides
- Othonna trinervia
- Othonna triplinervia
- Othonna umbelliformis
- Othonna undulosa
- Othonna viminea
- Othonna wrinkleana
