= Swanepoel =

Swanepoel is an Afrikaans surname, derived from the Dutch Zwaenepoel. Notable people with the surname include:

- Candice Swanepoel, South African supermodel
- Chris Swanepoel, South African golfer
- Corney Swanepoel, New Zealand swimmer
- Landi Swanepoel, South African model
- Pieter Swanepoel, South African cricketer
- Stephan Swanepoel, Namibian cricketer
- Tiaan Swanepoel, Namibian rugby union player
- Werner Swanepoel, South African rugby player

== See also ==
- Swanepoelspoort - a mountain pass in South Africa
