= Steinkopf, South Africa =

Steinkopf
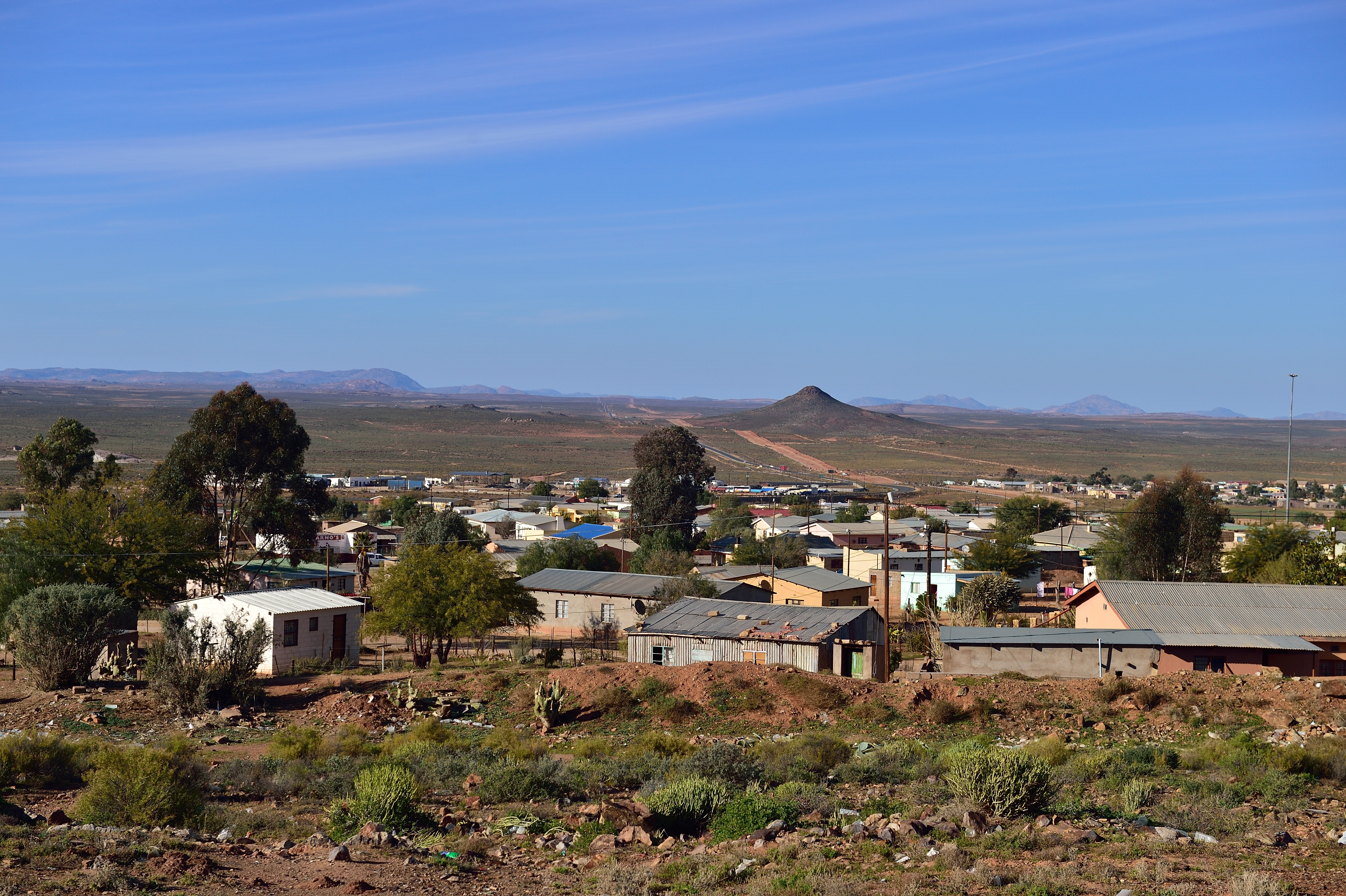

- Location within Northern Cape Location within South Africa
- Coordinates: 29.261389°S 17.733611°E
- Country: South Africa
- Province: Northern Cape
- District: Namakwa
- Municipality: Nama Khoi

Area
  - Total: 7.59 km^{2} (2.93 sq mi)

Population (2011)
  - Total: 7,842
  - Density: 1,030/km^{2} (2,680/sq mi)

Racial makeup (2011)
  - Black African: 3.3%
  - Coloured: 95.4%
  - Indian/Asian: 0.2%
  - White: 0.4%
  - Other: 0.6%

First languages (2011)
  - Afrikaans: 98.2%
  - Other: 1.8%
- Time zone: UTC+2 (SAST)
- Postal code (street): 8244
- PO box: 8244
- Area code: 027

Steinkopf is a town in Namakwa District Municipality in the Northern Cape province of South Africa.

The town is located about 45 km north-north-west of Springbok. Formerly known as Kookfontein, it was established as a mission station of the London Missionary Society, but was later taken over by the Rhenish Mission. It is named after Karl Steinkopf (de), foreign secretary on the British and Foreign Bible Society.

Steinkopf is the birthplace of Tholwana Mohale, winner of South Africa's Got Talent 2014.

== History ==
The Rev. Christiaan Albrecht of the London Missionary Society (LMS) secured permission from the Cape Colony authorities to minister to the area as early as 1809. The first local mission was founded near Besondermeid in 1817 by Rev. Heinrich Schmelen of the LMS in 1817, and he named it Steinkopf after his spiritual mentor in London, Dr. Karl Steinkopf. When the LMS began working in the area, it was ruled by the Nama chiefs Vigiland and Orlam, vice-captains of captain Kido Witbooi, at the time the predominant leader of Little Namaqualand between Buffelsrivier and the Orange River.

The Rev. Michael Wimmer moved the mission 5 km north of Besondermeid to Kookfontein Farm, where Steinkopf is today. The Rhenish Missionary Society (RMS) took over the LMS's work in 1840, when the latter left the area. Steinkopf became part of Cape Colony in 1847, when the colonial border shifted to the Orange River, but it was not until 1913, with the implementation of the Mission Stations and Communal Reserves Act of 1909, that direct state control was established. In 1934, the RMS left the region to the Dutch Reformed Church in South Africa (NGK) Mission Church, which in 1994 became part of the Uniting Reformed Church in Southern Africa (VGKSA).

In the early years of the mission, Steinkopf was wracked by violence between the San hunter-gatherers and pastoral communities. A mass grave of 32 Nama children at Kinderlê just north of town testifies to the bloody struggles that almost wiped out the San from the area.

When the railway was built to carry copper from the mines near Okiep, it passed through Steinkopf on the way to Port Nolloth, growing the mission town considerably. Steinkopf was also invaded by the Boer forces during the Second Boer War, under the leadership of Gen. Jan Smuts, and many fled to the refugee camp in Port Nolloth. Several local citizens served the British as part of the Town Guards and Border Scouts. Around 10 km north of town on the road to Port Nolloth, near Klipfontein, there remain graves of soldiers killed in the war and ruins of the railway station and hotel that served passengers on the copper line.

== The area today ==
The town has a population of around 7,850 and lies in the northernmost portion of the Namaqualand floral region, where winter rainfall is strongest but summer rains sometimes occur. Livestock are also pastured in the area, and the mountains around the town feature three distinct plant biomes, namely Cape fynbos, Kamiesberge, and Richtersveld. The town itself is in the Namaqualand Klein Koperberge, but the eastern pastures are part of Bushmanland and the western ones sandveld.

Most inhabitants either raise livestock communally or commute to mines in larger towns. At Henkries, about 50 km to the northeast, a state-run date farm operates; its produce is readily available in Steinkopf.

Steinkopf was once a major educational center and featured what was for decades the only high school in Namaqualand for those the National Party government deemed Cape Coloureds. The school drew students from far and wide. Today, organizations such as the E.J. Appies House old age home and the Immanuel Center for the Disabled here serve people from around Namaqualand.

== Sources ==
- Carstens, W.P. (1966). The Social Structure of Cape Coloured Reserve.
- Erasmus, B.P.J. 1995. Op Pad in Suid-Afrika. ISBN 1-86842-026-4
- Kieran, Brian L. (1995). The Defence and Relief of O'okiep Cape Colony, ISBN 976-8136-30-8
- Smalberger, John (1975). The History of Copper Mining in Namaqualand. ISBN 0 620 25473 4
- Trupper, Ursula. The Invisible Women Zara Schmelen. 2006. ISBN 3-905141-91-4
