= Palfuria spirembolus =

Namibia Palfuria zodariid spider

Conservation status
- Least Concern (SANBI Red List)

Scientific classification
- Kingdom: Animalia
- Phylum: Arthropoda
- Subphylum: Chelicerata
- Class: Arachnida
- Order: Araneae
- Infraorder: Araneomorphae
- Family: Zodariidae
- Genus: Palfuria
- Species: P. spirembolus

Binomial name
- Palfuria spirembolus Szűts & Jocqué, 2001

Species of spider

Palfuria spirembolus is a species of spider in the family Zodariidae. It is found in Namibia and South Africa and is commonly known as the Namibia Palfuria zodariid spider.

== Etymology ==
The epithet is a compound of Latin spira (spiral) and embolus, referring to the long large embolus.

== Distribution ==
Palfuria spirembolus occurs in southern Africa, with records from Namibia and the Limpopo and Mpumalanga provinces of South Africa. South African localities include Kruger National Park, Letaba, Legalameetse Nature Reserve, Olifantskamp, and the Skukuza-Malelane area.

== Habitat ==
The species is a very small, rare ground dweller that inhabits the Savanna biome at altitudes ranging from 208 to 687 m above sea level. It has been collected using pitfall traps.

== Description ==
Palfuria spirembolus is easily recognized by the strongly elevated cephalic part of the carapace and the presence of dorsolateral circumferential folds on the opisthosoma. The species is among the smaller members of the genus Palfuria, measuring 1.41–3.4 mm in total length.

== Conservation ==
The species is listed as Least Concern by the South African National Biodiversity Institute due to its wide geographical range in southern Africa. It is protected in Kruger National Park and Legalameetse Nature Reserve.
