= Palfuria hirsuta =

Scientific classification
- Kingdom: Animalia
- Phylum: Arthropoda
- Subphylum: Chelicerata
- Class: Arachnida
- Order: Araneae
- Infraorder: Araneomorphae
- Family: Zodariidae
- Genus: Palfuria
- Species: P. hirsuta

Binomial name
- Palfuria hirsuta Szüts & Jocqué, 2001

Species of spider

Palfuria hirsuta is a spider species of the family Zodariidae.

== Etymology ==
The epithet hirsuta (Latin for "hairy") refers to the hairy appearance.

== Distribution ==
P. hirsuta occurs in Zambia.
