= Goodhouse =

Town in Northern Cape, South Africa

Goodhouse Gádaos (Nama)
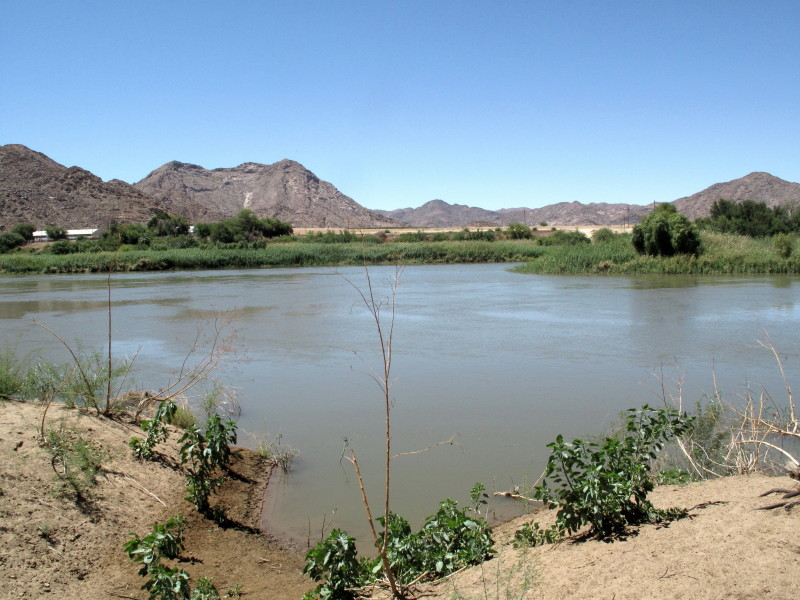
- Ford at Goodhouse

- Location within Northern Cape Location within South Africa
- Coordinates: 28.9°S 18.25°E
- Country: South Africa
- Province: Northern Cape
- District: Namakwa
- Municipality: Nama Khoi

Area
  - Total: 0.30 km^{2} (0.12 sq mi)

Population (2011)
  - Total: 171
  - Density: 570/km^{2} (1,500/sq mi)

Racial makeup (2011)
  - Black African: 0.6%
  - Coloured: 98.8%
  - Other: 0.6%

First languages (2011)
  - Afrikaans: 96.5%
  - English: 2.9%
  - Other: 0.6%
- Time zone: UTC+2 (SAST)

Goodhouse (Nama: Gádaos) is a town in Nama Khoi Local Municipality in the Northern Cape province of South Africa.

Locality with a landing-strip, on the southern bank of the Orange River, 60 km south-west of Warmbad and 60 km east-south-east of Vioolsdrif. The name is a folk etymological adaptation of the Khoekhoen Gudaos, 'sheep ford', said to be the place where the Namas crossed the Orange River with their sheep when they trekked from Little Namaqualand to Great Namaqualand.
