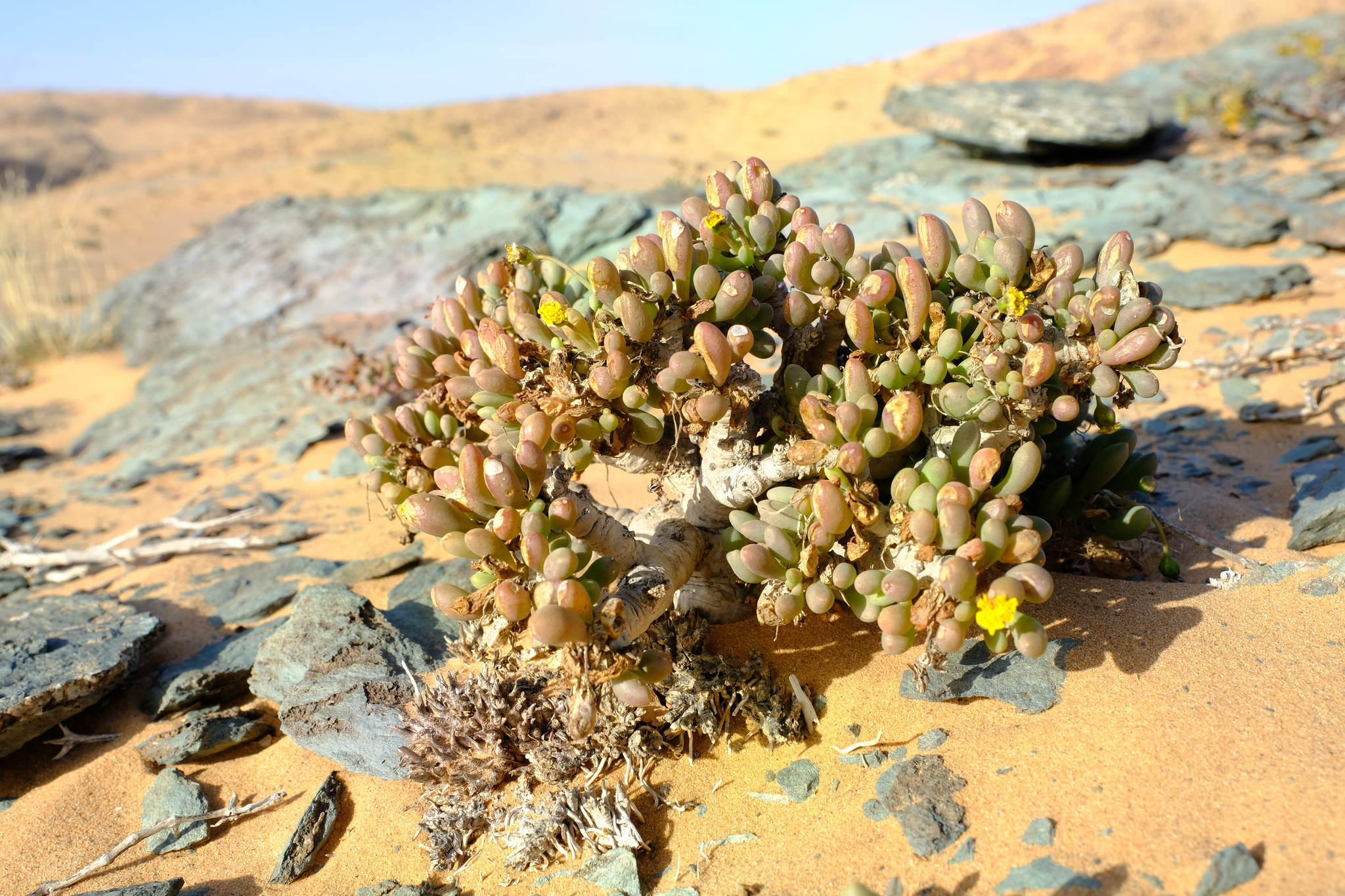

Conservation status
- Least Concern (IUCN 3.1)

Scientific classification
- Kingdom: Plantae
- Clade: Tracheophytes
- Clade: Angiosperms
- Clade: Eudicots
- Clade: Asterids
- Order: Asterales
- Family: Asteraceae
- Genus: Crassothonna
- Species: C. clavifolia

Binomial name
- Crassothonna clavifolia (Marloth) B.Nord.

Synonyms
- Homotypic Synonyms: Othonna clavifolia Marloth

= Crassothonna clavifolia =

Species of flowering plant

Crassothonna clavifolia (previously Othonna clavifolia) is a species of flowering plant in the family Asteraceae. It is endemic to Namibia. Its natural habitat is rocky areas. It is threatened by habitat loss.

== Description ==
This species is a low-growing succulent with grey, trailing branches and squat, cylindrical or barrel-like leaves. The yellow, daisy-like flowers grow on long stalks. The specific epithet, clavifolia, is from the Latin words clava meaning a club and folia meaning leaves, referring to the club-shape of the leaves.

== Taxonomy ==
This species was described by Hermann Wilhelm Rudolf Marloth in 1910 as Othonna clavifolia, however, the genus was changed from Othonna by Nordenstam et al., who erected the new genus Crassothonna for a distinct clade of Othonna species. The new name for this species is therefore Crassothonna clavifolia (Marloth) B.Nord.

== Distribution and habitat ==
This species is found from the northwest of the Richtersveld where the sandveld meets the Gariep River towards the southern Namibian coast. This succulent is found in sandy deserts sometimes growing among rocks.

== Threats and cultivation ==
The species was classified in 2004 by the IUCN as Least Concern, although recent concern has been expressed about commercial looting of this plant as part of the succulent plant market.
