= Hantam Local Municipality =

Hantam
- Local municipality
- Seal

- Location in the Northern Cape
- Coordinates: 31°15′S 19°45′E
- Country: South Africa
- Province: Northern Cape
- District: Namakwa
- Seat: Calvinia
- Wards: 7

Government
  - Type: Municipal council
  - Mayor: Roger Nieldo Swartz (ANC)

Area
  - Total: 36,128 km^{2} (13,949 sq mi)

Population (2022)
  - Total: 22,281
  - Density: 0.61672/km^{2} (1.5973/sq mi)

Racial makeup (2022)
  - Black African: 1.4%
  - Coloured: 87.5%
  - White: 10.5%

First languages (2011)
  - Afrikaans: 96.7%
  - English: 1.1%
  - Other: 2.2%
- Time zone: UTC+2 (SAST)
- Municipal code: NC065

Hantam Municipality (Afrikaans: Hantam Munisipaliteit) is a local municipality within the Namakwa District Municipality, in the Northern Cape province of South Africa.

Hantam is a Khoekhoe word that means "mountains where the bulbs grow". The municipality is named after the Hantam Mountains found in the area.

== Main places ==
The 2011 census divided the municipality into the following main places:

Place	Code	Population	Area (km^{2})
Brandvlei	366001	2,859	29.3
Calvinia	366005	9,680	154.5
Loeriesfontein	366003	2,744	34.5
Nieuwoudtville	366004	2,093	26.3
Tankwa Karoo National Park	366006	28	267.9
Remainder	366002	4,175	35,615.7
Total		21,578	36,128.0

== Demographics ==
According to the 2022 South African census, the municipality had a population of 22,281 people. Of these, 87.5% identified as "Coloured," 10.5% as "White," and 1.4% as "Black African."

== Finances ==
In the 2018/19 financial year, 78% of the council's expenditure was deemed unauthorised, irregular, fruitless and wasteful, down from 95% the previous year. At the end of the 2019 year, the council had a cash balance to cover its operating costs for ten days.

== Politics ==
The municipal council consists of thirteen members elected by mixed-member proportional representation. Seven councillors are elected by first-past-the-post voting in seven wards, while the remaining six are chosen from party lists so that the total number of party representatives is proportional to the number of votes received. In the election of 1 November 2021 no party obtained a majority of seats on the council. The following table shows the results of the election.

Hantam local election, 1 November 2021
Party	Votes				Seats		
Party	Ward	List	Total	%	Ward	List	Total
African National Congress	3,660	3,637	7,297	44.5%	5	1	6
Democratic Alliance	2,322	2,359	4,681	28.6%	2	2	4
Patriotic Alliance	602	623	1,225	7.5%	0	1	1
Freedom Front Plus	604	587	1,191	7.3%	0	1	1
Namakwa Civic Movement	338	390	728	4.4%	0	1	1
Good	240	254	494	3.0%	0	0	0
Congress of the People	144	216	360	2.2%	0	0	0
Independent candidates	207	–	207	1.3%	0	–	0
Economic Freedom Fighters	75	82	157	1.0%	0	0	0
African Christian Democratic Party	26	21	47	0.3%	0	0	0
Total	8,218	8,169	16,387		7	6	13
Valid votes	8,218	8,169	16,387	98.0%			
Spoilt votes	161	172	333	2.0%			
Total votes cast	8,379	8,341	16,720				
Voter turnout	8,393						
Registered voters	13,732						
Turnout percentage	61.1%						
