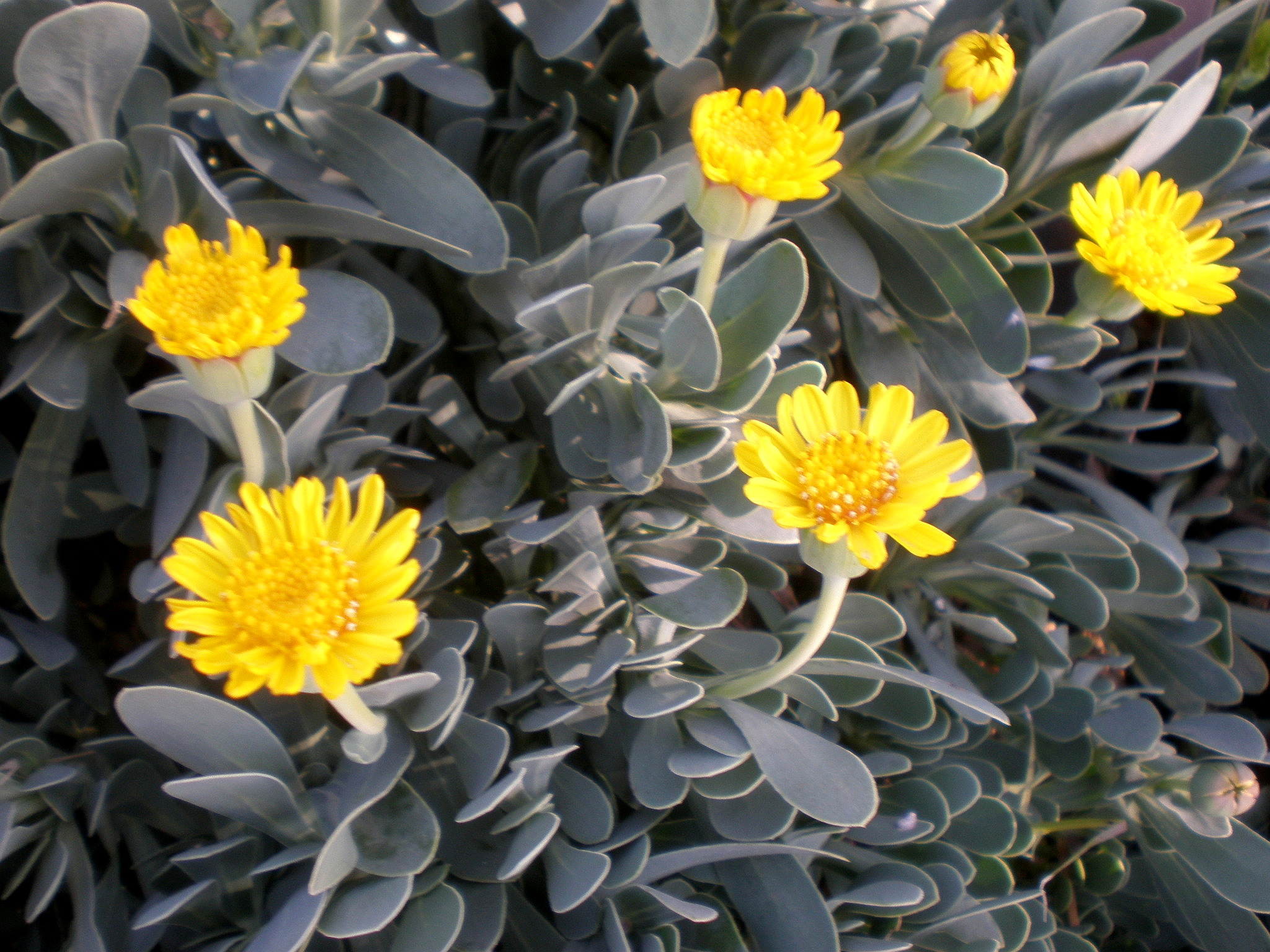
- Hertia cheirifolia

Scientific classification
- Kingdom: Plantae
- Clade: Embryophytes
- Clade: Tracheophytes
- Clade: Angiosperms
- Clade: Eudicots
- Clade: Asterids
- Order: Asterales
- Family: Asteraceae
- Subfamily: Asteroideae
- Tribe: Senecioneae
- Genus: Hertia; Less.

Synonyms
- Othonnopsis Jaub. & Spach

= Hertia (plant) =

Genus of flowering plants

Hertia is a genus of flowering plants in the sunflower family, native to Africa and southwestern Asia.

Species

- Hertia alata (Thunb.) Kuntze - Cape Province in South Africa
- Hertia angustifolia (DC.) Kuntze - Iran
- Hertia cheirifolia (L.) Kuntze - Algeria, Tunisia
- Hertia ciliata (Harv.) Kuntze - South Africa
- Hertia cluytiifolia (DC.) Kuntze - Cape Province in South Africa
- Hertia intermedia (Boiss.) Kuntze - Iran, Afghanistan
- Hertia kraussii (Sch.Bip.) Fourc. - South Africa
- Hertia maroccana (Batt.) Maire - Morocco
- Hertia pallens (DC.) Kuntze - South Africa
