= Nama Khoi Local Municipality =

Nama Khoi
- Local municipality
- Seal

- Location in the Northern Cape
- Coordinates: 29°30′S 18°00′E
- Country: South Africa
- Province: Northern Cape
- District: Namakwa
- Seat: Springbok
- Wards: 9

Government
  - Type: Municipal council
  - Mayor: Gustav Bock (NCM)

Area
  - Total: 17,989 km^{2} (6,946 sq mi)

Population (2022)
  - Total: 67,089
  - Density: 3.7294/km^{2} (9.6592/sq mi)

Racial makeup (2022)
  - Black African: 4.8%
  - Coloured: 88.9%
  - Indian/Asian: 0.6%
  - White: 5.2%

First languages (2011)
  - Afrikaans: 95.9%
  - Xhosa: 1.0%
  - Other: 3.1%
- Time zone: UTC+2 (SAST)
- Municipal code: NC062

Nama Khoi Municipality (Afrikaans: Nama Khoi Munisipaliteit) is a local municipality within the Namakwa District Municipality, in the Northern Cape province of South Africa. Its seat is Springbok.

== Main places ==
The 2011 census divided the municipality into the following main places:

Place	Code	Area (km^{2})	Population
Bulletrap	364006	1.8	415
Carolusberg	364013	123.6	1,336
Concordia	364007	4.8	4,988
Goodhouse	364004	0.3	171
Kleinzee	364009	9.1	728
Kleinzee Mine	364008	160.2	3
Komaggas	364014	2.6	3,116
Kotzehoop	364001	9.3	467
Nababeep	364010	123.1	5,374
Okiep	364011	38.6	6,304
Springbok	364012	37.6	12,790
Steinkopf	364005	7.6	7,842
Vioolsdrif	364003	2.0	599
Remainder	364002	17,468.1	2,909
Total		17,988.6	47,041

== Politics ==
The municipal council consists of seventeen members elected by mixed-member proportional representation. Nine councillors are elected by first-past-the-post voting in nine wards, while the remaining eight are chosen from party lists so that the total number of party representatives is proportional to the number of votes received. In the election of 1 November 2021 no party obtained a majority on the council. The Democratic Alliance and the Namakwa Civic Movement formed a coalition to govern the municipality,

Nama Khoi local election, 1 November 2021
Party	Votes				Seats		
Party	Ward	List	Total	%	Ward	List	Total
African National Congress	6,625	6,513	13,138	42.0%	7	0	7
Democratic Alliance	4,665	4,739	9,404	30.1%	1	4	5
Namakwa Civic Movement	3,229	3,290	6,519	20.8%	1	3	4
Freedom Front Plus	223	234	457	1.5%	0	1	1
Khoisan Revolution	213	225	438	1.4%	0	0	0
Good	145	147	292	0.9%	0	0	0
Patriotic Alliance	123	168	291	0.9%	0	0	0
Congress of the People	131	143	274	0.9%	0	0	0
Economic Freedom Fighters	115	120	235	0.8%	0	0	0
National Economic Fighters	132	–	132	0.4%	0	–	0
Independent Civic Organisation of South Africa	34	31	65	0.2%	0	0	0
African Transformation Movement	1	19	20	0.1%	0	0	0
South African Royal Kingdoms Organization	4	6	10	0.0%	0	0	0
Total	15,640	15,635	31,275		9	8	17
Valid votes	15,640	15,635	31,275	98.9%			
Spoilt votes	174	179	353	1.1%			
Total votes cast	15,814	15,814	31,628				
Voter turnout	15,814						
Registered voters	29,072						
Turnout percentage	54.4%						
