= Namakwa Civic Movement =

South African political party

- Abbreviation: NCM
- Leader: Richie Cloete
- Founded: February 2021; 4 years ago
- Headquarters: Address: 3 Koperberg str, Springbok, Northern Cape, South Africa
- Ideology: Namakwa regionalism
- Slogan: "Rise NCM rise. Move NCM move"
- Nama Khoi Local Municipality: 4 / 17
- Khâi-Ma Local Municipality: 2 / 11
- Kamiesberg Local Municipality: 1 / 11
- Hantam Local Municipality: 1 / 13

Website
- namakwacivic.org.za

The Namakwa Civic Movement (NCM), is a regional political party in Namakwa District Municipality in South Africa. It is led by Dr. Gustav Bock, leader and party chairperson.

It was formed in 2021.

== Election results ==
The party contested its first elections in 2021, winning 8 seats in several local municipalities in the Namakwa District.

=== Municipal elections ===
Election	Local Municipality	Votes	%	Seats
2021
2021	Nama Khoi	6,519	20.84%	4
2021	Hantam	728	4.44%	1
2021	Kamiesberg	772	7.49%	1
2021	Khâi-Ma	1,709	19.62%	2
2021	Richtersveld	340	3.84%	0
