= List of Anapidae species =

This page lists all described genera and species of the spider family Anapidae. As of March 2019, the World Spider Catalog accepts 235 species in 58 genera:

== A ==
=== Acrobleps ===
Acrobleps Hickman, 1979

- Acrobleps hygrophilus Hickman, 1979 (type) — Australia (Tasmania)

=== Algidiella ===
Algidiella Rix & Harvey, 2010

- Algidiella aucklandica (Forster, 1955) (type) — New Zealand (Auckland Is.)

=== Anapis ===
Anapis Simon, 1895

- Anapis amazonas Platnick & Shadab, 1978 — Colombia
- Anapis anabelleae Dupérré & Tapia, 2018 — Ecuador
- Anapis anchicaya Platnick & Shadab, 1978 — Colombia
- Anapis atuncela Platnick & Shadab, 1978 — Colombia
- Anapis calima Platnick & Shadab, 1978 — Colombia
- Anapis caluga Platnick & Shadab, 1978 — Peru
- Anapis carmencita Dupérré & Tapia, 2018 — Ecuador
- Anapis castilla Platnick & Shadab, 1978 — Peru, Brazil
- Anapis chiriboga Platnick & Shadab, 1978 — Ecuador
- Anapis choroni Platnick & Shadab, 1978 — Venezuela
- Anapis churu Dupérré & Tapia, 2018 — Ecuador
- Anapis circinata (Simon, 1895) — Venezuela
- Anapis digua Platnick & Shadab, 1978 — Colombia
- Anapis discoidalis (Balogh & Loksa, 1968) — Brazil
- Anapis felidia Platnick & Shadab, 1978 — Colombia
- Anapis guasca Platnick & Shadab, 1978 — Colombia
- Anapis heredia Platnick & Shadab, 1978 — Costa Rica
- Anapis hetschki (Keyserling, 1886) (type) — Brazil
- Anapis keyserlingi Gertsch, 1941 — Panama
- Anapis mariebertheae Dupérré & Tapia, 2018 — Ecuador
- Anapis meta Platnick & Shadab, 1978 — Colombia
- Anapis mexicana Forster, 1958 — Mexico, Belize
- Anapis minutissima (Simon, 1903) — Jamaica
- Anapis monteverde Platnick & Shadab, 1978 — Costa Rica
- Anapis naranja Dupérré & Tapia, 2018 — Ecuador
- Anapis nawchi Dupérré & Tapia, 2018 — Ecuador
- Anapis nevada Müller, 1987 — Colombia
- Anapis saladito Platnick & Shadab, 1978 — Colombia
- Anapis shina Dupérré & Tapia, 2018 — Ecuador

=== Anapisona ===
Anapisona Gertsch, 1941

- Anapisona aragua Platnick & Shadab, 1979 — Colombia, Venezuela
- Anapisona ashmolei Platnick & Shadab, 1979 — Ecuador
- Anapisona bolivari Georgescu, 1987 — Venezuela
- Anapisona bordeaux Platnick & Shadab, 1979 — Virgin Is., Brazil
- Anapisona furtiva Gertsch, 1941 — Panama
- Anapisona guerrai Müller, 1987 — Colombia
- Anapisona hamigera (Simon, 1898) — Panama, Colombia, Venezuela, St. Vincent
- Anapisona kartabo Forster, 1958 — Guyana
- Anapisona kethleyi Platnick & Shadab, 1979 — Mexico, Costa Rica
- Anapisona pecki Platnick & Shadab, 1979 — Ecuador
- Anapisona platnicki Brignoli, 1981 — Brazil
- Anapisona schuhi Platnick & Shadab, 1979 — Brazil
- Anapisona simoni Gertsch, 1941 (type) — Panama

=== Austropholcomma ===
Austropholcomma Rix & Harvey, 2010

- Austropholcomma florentine Rix & Harvey, 2010 (type) — Australia (Tasmania)
- Austropholcomma walpole Rix & Harvey, 2010 — Australia (Western Australia)

== B ==
=== Borneanapis ===
Borneanapis Snazell, 2009

- Borneanapis belalong Snazell, 2009 (type) — Borneo

== C ==
=== Caledanapis ===
Caledanapis Platnick & Forster, 1989

- Caledanapis dzumac Platnick & Forster, 1989 — New Caledonia
- Caledanapis insolita (Berland, 1924) — New Caledonia
- Caledanapis peckorum Platnick & Forster, 1989 (type) — New Caledonia
- Caledanapis pilupilu (Brignoli, 1981) — New Caledonia
- Caledanapis sera Platnick & Forster, 1989 — New Caledonia
- Caledanapis tillierorum Platnick & Forster, 1989 — New Caledonia

=== Chasmocephalon ===
Chasmocephalon O. Pickard-Cambridge, 1889

- Chasmocephalon acheron Platnick & Forster, 1989 — Australia (Victoria)
- Chasmocephalon alfred Platnick & Forster, 1989 — Australia (Victoria)
- Chasmocephalon eungella Platnick & Forster, 1989 — Australia (Queensland)
- Chasmocephalon flinders Platnick & Forster, 1989 — Australia (Western Australia)
- Chasmocephalon iluka Platnick & Forster, 1989 — Eastern Australia
- Chasmocephalon neglectum O. Pickard-Cambridge, 1889 (type) — Australia (Western Australia)
- Chasmocephalon pemberton Platnick & Forster, 1989 — Australia (Western Australia)
- Chasmocephalon tingle Platnick & Forster, 1989 — Australia (Western Australia)

=== Comaroma ===
Comaroma Bertkau, 1889

- Comaroma hatsushibai Ono, 2005 — Japan
- Comaroma maculosa Oi, 1960 — China, Korea, Japan
- Comaroma mendocino (Levi, 1957) — USA
- Comaroma nakahirai (Yaginuma, 1959) — Japan
- Comaroma simoni Bertkau, 1889 (type) — Europe
- Comaroma tongjunca Zhang & Chen, 1994 — China

=== Conculus ===
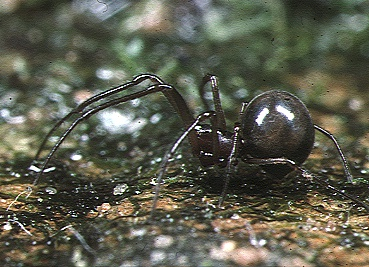
Conculus lyugadinus, female

Conculus Kishida, 1940

- Conculus grossus (Forster, 1959) — New Guinea
- Conculus lyugadinus Kishida, 1940 (type) — China, Korea, Japan
- Conculus simboggulensis Paik, 1971 — Korea

=== Crassanapis ===
Crassanapis Platnick & Forster, 1989

- Crassanapis calderoni Platnick & Forster, 1989 — Chile
- Crassanapis cekalovici Platnick & Forster, 1989 — Chile, Argentina
- Crassanapis chaiten Platnick & Forster, 1989 — Chile
- Crassanapis chilensis Platnick & Forster, 1989 (type) — Chile
- Crassanapis contulmo Platnick & Forster, 1989 — Chile

=== Crozetulus ===
Crozetulus Hickman, 1939

- Crozetulus minutus Hickman, 1939 (type) — Crozet Is.
- Crozetulus rhodesiensis Brignoli, 1981 — Namibia, Zimbabwe, South Africa
- Crozetulus rotundus (Forster, 1974) — Congo
- Crozetulus scutatus (Lawrence, 1964) — South Africa

== D ==
=== Dippenaaria ===
Dippenaaria Wunderlich, 1995

- Dippenaaria luxurians Wunderlich, 1995 (type) — South Africa

== E ==
=== Elanapis ===
Elanapis Platnick & Forster, 1989

- Elanapis aisen Platnick & Forster, 1989 (type) — Chile

=== Enielkenie ===
Enielkenie Ono, 2007

- Enielkenie acaroides Ono, 2007 (type) — Taiwan

=== Eperiella ===
Eperiella Rix & Harvey, 2010

- Eperiella alsophila Rix & Harvey, 2010 (type) — Chile
- Eperiella hastings Rix & Harvey, 2010 — Australia (Tasmania)

=== Epigastrina ===
Epigastrina Rix & Harvey, 2010

- Epigastrina fulva (Hickman, 1945) (type) — Australia (Tasmania)
- Epigastrina loongana Rix & Harvey, 2010 — Australia (Tasmania)
- Epigastrina typhlops Rix & Harvey, 2010 — Australia (Tasmania)

=== Eterosonycha ===
Eterosonycha Butler, 1932

- Eterosonycha alpina Butler, 1932 (type) — Australia (New South Wales, Victoria, Tasmania)
- Eterosonycha aquilina Rix & Harvey, 2010 — Australia (New South Wales, Victoria, Tasmania)
- Eterosonycha complexa (Forster, 1959) — Australia (New South Wales)
- Eterosonycha ocellata Rix & Harvey, 2010 — Australia (Victoria)

== F ==
=== Forsteriola ===
Forsteriola Brignoli, 1981

- Forsteriola proloba (Forster, 1974) (type) — Burundi, Rwanda
- Forsteriola rugosa (Forster, 1974) — Congo

== G ==
=== Gaiziapis ===
Gaiziapis Miller, Griswold & Yin, 2009

- Gaiziapis encunensis Lin & Li, 2012 — China
- Gaiziapis zhizhuba Miller, Griswold & Yin, 2009 (type) — China

=== Gertschanapis ===
Gertschanapis Platnick & Forster, 1990

- Gertschanapis shantzi (Gertsch, 1960) (type) — USA

=== Gigiella ===
Gigiella Rix & Harvey, 2010

- Gigiella milledgei Rix & Harvey, 2010 (type) — Australia (Victoria, Tasmania)
- Gigiella platnicki Rix & Harvey, 2010 — Chile

=== Guiniella ===
Guiniella Rix & Harvey, 2010

- Guiniella tropica (Forster, 1959) (type) — New Guinea

== H ==
=== Hickmanapis ===
Hickmanapis Platnick & Forster, 1989

- Hickmanapis minuta (Hickman, 1944) — Australia (Tasmania)
- Hickmanapis renison Platnick & Forster, 1989 (type) — Australia (Tasmania)

=== Holarchaea ===
Holarchaea Forster, 1955

- Holarchaea globosa (Hickman, 1981) — Australia (Tasmania)
- Holarchaea novaeseelandiae (Forster, 1949) (type) — New Zealand

== M ==
=== Mandanapis ===
Mandanapis Platnick & Forster, 1989

- Mandanapis cooki Platnick & Forster, 1989 (type) — New Caledonia

=== Maxanapis ===
Maxanapis Platnick & Forster, 1989

- Maxanapis bartle Platnick & Forster, 1989 (type) — Australia (Queensland)
- Maxanapis bell Platnick & Forster, 1989 — Australia (Queensland)
- Maxanapis bellenden Platnick & Forster, 1989 — Australia (Queensland)
- Maxanapis burra (Forster, 1959) — Australia (Queensland, New South Wales)
- Maxanapis crassifemoralis (Wunderlich, 1976) — Australia (Queensland, New South Wales)
- Maxanapis dorrigo Platnick & Forster, 1989 — Australia (New South Wales)
- Maxanapis mossman Platnick & Forster, 1989 — Australia (Queensland)
- Maxanapis tenterfield Platnick & Forster, 1989 — Australia (Queensland, New South Wales)
- Maxanapis tribulation Platnick & Forster, 1989 — Australia (Queensland)

=== Metanapis ===
Metanapis Brignoli, 1981

- Metanapis bimaculata (Simon, 1895) — South Africa
- Metanapis mahnerti Brignoli, 1981 (type) — Kenya
- Metanapis montisemodi (Brignoli, 1978) — Nepal
- Metanapis plutella (Forster, 1974) — Congo
- Metanapis tectimundi (Brignoli, 1978) — Nepal

=== Micropholcomma ===
Micropholcomma Crosby & Bishop, 1927

- Micropholcomma bryophilum (Butler, 1932) — Australia (Queensland to Tasmania)
- Micropholcomma caeligenum Crosby & Bishop, 1927 (type) — Australia (Victoria)
- Micropholcomma junee Rix & Harvey, 2010 — Australia (Tasmania)
- Micropholcomma linnaei Rix, 2008 — Australia (Western Australia)
- Micropholcomma longissimum (Butler, 1932) — Australia (Queensland to Tasmania)
- Micropholcomma mirum Hickman, 1944 — Australia (Tasmania)
- Micropholcomma parmatum Hickman, 1944 — Australia (Tasmania)
- Micropholcomma turbans Hickman, 1981 — Australia (Tasmania)

=== Minanapis ===
Minanapis Platnick & Forster, 1989

- Minanapis casablanca Platnick & Forster, 1989 — Chile
- Minanapis floris Platnick & Forster, 1989 — Chile
- Minanapis menglunensis Lin & Li, 2012 — China
- Minanapis palena Platnick & Forster, 1989 — Chile, Argentina
- Minanapis talinay Platnick & Forster, 1989 (type) — Chile

=== Montanapis ===
Montanapis Platnick & Forster, 1989

- Montanapis koghis Platnick & Forster, 1989 (type) — New Caledonia

== N ==
=== Normplatnicka ===
Normplatnicka Rix & Harvey, 2010

- Normplatnicka barrettae Rix & Harvey, 2010 — Australia (Western Australia)
- Normplatnicka chilensis Rix & Harvey, 2010 — Chile
- Normplatnicka lamingtonensis (Forster, 1959) (type) — Australia (Queensland, New South Wales, Victoria)

=== Nortanapis ===
Nortanapis Platnick & Forster, 1989

- Nortanapis lamond Platnick & Forster, 1989 (type) — Australia (Queensland)

=== Novanapis ===
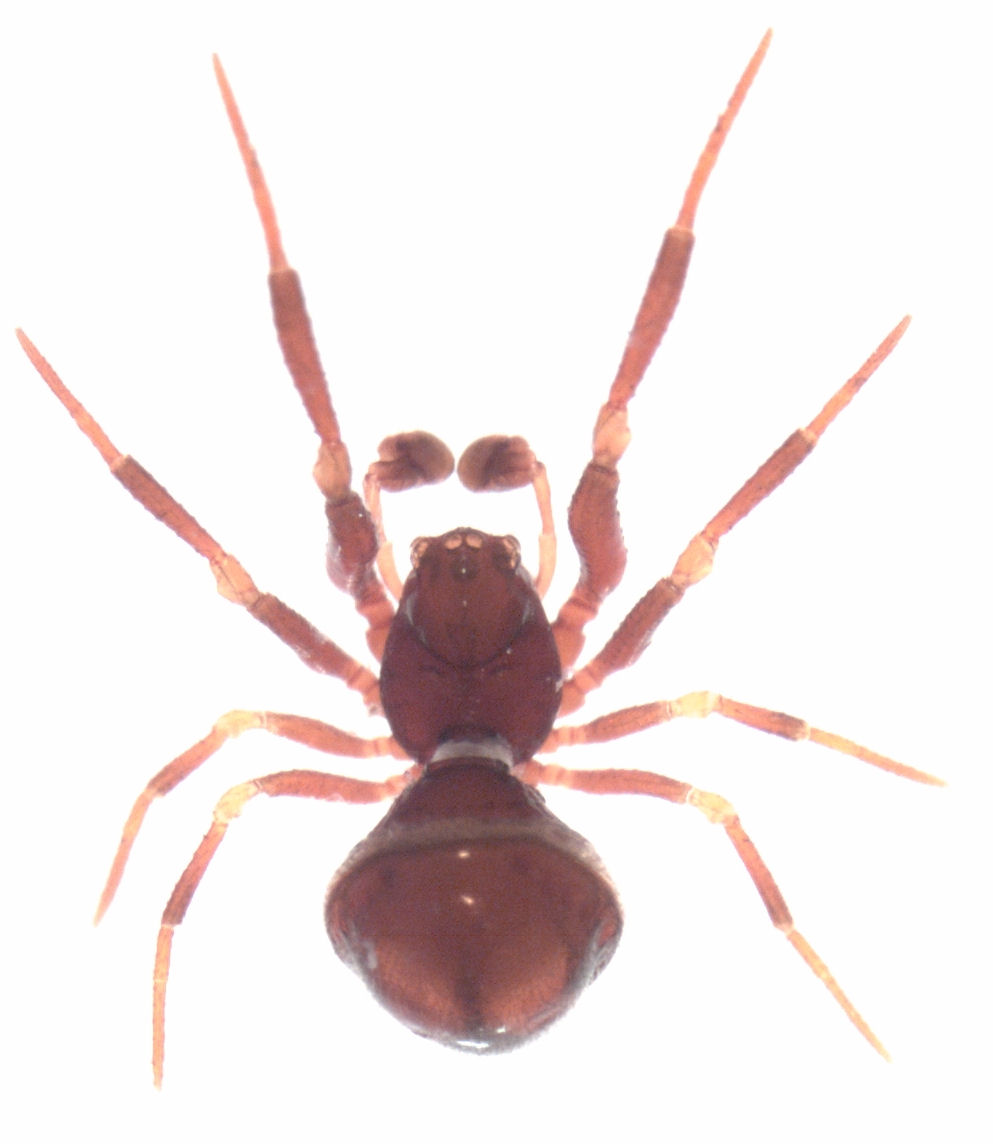
Novanapis spinipes, male dorsal

Novanapis Platnick & Forster, 1989

- Novanapis spinipes (Forster, 1951) (type) — New Zealand

== O ==
=== Octanapis ===
Octanapis Platnick & Forster, 1989

- Octanapis cann Platnick & Forster, 1989 (type) — Australia (New South Wales, Victoria)
- Octanapis octocula (Forster, 1959) — Australia (Queensland)

=== Olgania ===
Olgania Hickman, 1979

- Olgania cracroft Rix & Harvey, 2010 — Australia (Tasmania)
- Olgania eberhardi Rix & Harvey, 2010 — Australia (Tasmania)
- Olgania excavata Hickman, 1979 (type) — Australia (Tasmania)
- Olgania troglodytes Rix & Harvey, 2010 — Australia (Tasmania)
- Olgania weld Rix & Harvey, 2010 — Australia (Tasmania)

== P ==
=== Paranapis ===
Paranapis Platnick & Forster, 1989

- Paranapis insula (Forster, 1951) (type) — New Zealand
- Paranapis isolata Platnick & Forster, 1989 — New Zealand

=== Patelliella ===
Patelliella Rix & Harvey, 2010

- Patelliella adusta Rix & Harvey, 2010 (type) — Australia (Lord Howe Is.)

=== Pecanapis ===
Pecanapis Platnick & Forster, 1989

- Pecanapis franckei Platnick & Forster, 1989 (type) — Chile

=== Pseudanapis ===
Pseudanapis Simon, 1905

- Pseudanapis aloha Forster, 1959 — Japan, Hawaii, Caroline Is., Australia (Queensland). Introduced to Britain, Germany
- Pseudanapis amrishi (Makhan & Ezzatpanah, 2011) — Suriname
- Pseudanapis benoiti Platnick & Shadab, 1979 — Congo
- Pseudanapis domingo Platnick & Shadab, 1979 — Ecuador
- Pseudanapis gertschi (Forster, 1958) — Mexico, Costa Rica, Panama
- Pseudanapis hoeferi Kropf, 1995 — Brazil
- Pseudanapis namkhan Lin, Li & Jäger, 2013 — Laos
- Pseudanapis parocula (Simon, 1899) (type) — Laos, Malaysia, Indonesia (Sumatra, Java)
- Pseudanapis plumbea Forster, 1974 — Congo
- Pseudanapis schauenbergi Brignoli, 1981 — Mauritius, Réunion
- Pseudanapis serica Brignoli, 1981 — China (Hong Kong)
- Pseudanapis wilsoni Forster, 1959 — New Guinea

=== Pua ===
Pua Forster, 1959

- Pua novaezealandiae Forster, 1959 (type) — New Zealand

== Q ==
=== Queenslanapis ===
Queenslanapis Platnick & Forster, 1989

- Queenslanapis lamington Platnick & Forster, 1989 (type) — Australia (Queensland)

== R ==
=== Raveniella ===
Raveniella Rix & Harvey, 2010

- Raveniella apopsis Rix & Harvey, 2010 — Australia (New South Wales)
- Raveniella arenacea Rix & Harvey, 2010 — Australia (Western Australia)
- Raveniella cirrata Rix & Harvey, 2010 — Australia (Western Australia)
- Raveniella hickmani (Forster, 1959) — Australia (Tasmania)
- Raveniella janineae Rix & Harvey, 2010 — Australia (Western Australia)
- Raveniella luteola (Hickman, 1945) (type) — Australia (Queensland to Tasmania)
- Raveniella mucronata Rix & Harvey, 2010 — Australia (Western Australia)
- Raveniella peckorum Rix & Harvey, 2010 — Australia (Western Australia)
- Raveniella subcirrata Rix & Harvey, 2010 — Australia (Western Australia)

=== Rayforstia ===
Rayforstia Rix & Harvey, 2010

- Rayforstia antipoda (Forster, 1959) — New Zealand
- Rayforstia insula (Forster, 1959) — New Zealand
- Rayforstia lordhowensis Rix & Harvey, 2010 — Australia (Lord Howe Is.)
- Rayforstia mcfarlanei (Forster, 1959) — New Zealand
- Rayforstia plebeia (Forster, 1959) — New Zealand
- Rayforstia propinqua (Forster, 1959) — New Zealand
- Rayforstia raveni Rix & Harvey, 2010 — Australia (Queensland)
- Rayforstia salmoni (Forster, 1959) — New Zealand
- Rayforstia scuta (Forster, 1959) — New Zealand
- Rayforstia signata (Forster, 1959) — New Zealand
- Rayforstia vulgaris (Forster, 1959) (type) — New Zealand
- Rayforstia wisei (Forster, 1964) — New Zealand (Campbell Is.)

=== Risdonius ===
Risdonius Hickman, 1939

- Risdonius barrington Platnick & Forster, 1989 — Australia (New South Wales)
- Risdonius lind Platnick & Forster, 1989 — Australia (Victoria)
- Risdonius parvus Hickman, 1939 (type) — Australia (New South Wales to Tasmania)

== S ==
=== Sheranapis ===
Sheranapis Platnick & Forster, 1989

- Sheranapis bellavista Platnick & Forster, 1989 (type) — Chile
- Sheranapis quellon Platnick & Forster, 1989 — Chile
- Sheranapis villarrica Platnick & Forster, 1989 — Chile

=== Sinanapis ===
Sinanapis Wunderlich & Song, 1995

- Sinanapis crassitarsa Wunderlich & Song, 1995 (type) — China, Laos, Vietnam
- Sinanapis longituba Lin & Li, 2012 — China (Hainan)
- Sinanapis medogensis Zhang & Lin, 2018 — China
- Sinanapis wuyi Jin & Zhang, 2013 — China

=== Sofanapis ===
Sofanapis Platnick & Forster, 1989

- Sofanapis antillanca Platnick & Forster, 1989 (type) — Chile

=== Spinanapis ===
Spinanapis Platnick & Forster, 1989

- Spinanapis darlingtoni (Forster, 1959) — Australia (Queensland)
- Spinanapis frere Platnick & Forster, 1989 — Australia (Queensland)
- Spinanapis julatten Platnick & Forster, 1989 — Australia (Queensland)
- Spinanapis ker Platnick & Forster, 1989 (type) — Australia (Queensland)
- Spinanapis lewis Platnick & Forster, 1989 — Australia (Queensland)
- Spinanapis monteithi Platnick & Forster, 1989 — Australia (Queensland)
- Spinanapis thompsoni Platnick & Forster, 1989 — Australia (Queensland)
- Spinanapis thornton Platnick & Forster, 1989 — Australia (Queensland)
- Spinanapis yeatesi Platnick & Forster, 1989 — Australia (Queensland)

== T ==
=== Taliniella ===
Taliniella Rix & Harvey, 2010

- Taliniella nigra (Forster, 1959) (type) — New Zealand
- Taliniella vinki Rix & Harvey, 2010 — New Zealand

=== Taphiassa ===
Taphiassa Simon, 1880

- Taphiassa castanea Rix & Harvey, 2010 — Australia (Tasmania)
- Taphiassa globosa Rix & Harvey, 2010 — Australia (Western Australia)
- Taphiassa impressa Simon, 1880 (type) — New Caledonia
- Taphiassa magna Rix & Harvey, 2010 — Australia (Lord Howe Is.)
- Taphiassa punctata (Forster, 1959) — New Zealand
- Taphiassa punctigera Simon, 1895 — Sri Lanka
- Taphiassa robertsi Rix & Harvey, 2010 — Australia (Western Australia)

=== Tasmanapis ===
Tasmanapis Platnick & Forster, 1989

- Tasmanapis strahan Platnick & Forster, 1989 (type) — Australia (Tasmania)

=== Teutoniella ===
Teutoniella Brignoli, 1981

- Teutoniella cekalovici Platnick & Forster, 1986 — Chile
- Teutoniella plaumanni Brignoli, 1981 (type) — Brazil

=== Tinytrella ===
Tinytrella Rix & Harvey, 2010

- Tinytrella pusilla (Forster, 1959) (type) — New Zealand

=== Tricellina ===
Tricellina Forster & Platnick, 1989

- Tricellina gertschi (Forster & Platnick, 1981) (type) — Chile

== V ==
=== Victanapis ===
Victanapis Platnick & Forster, 1989

- Victanapis warburton Platnick & Forster, 1989 (type) — Australia (Victoria)

== Z ==
=== Zangherella ===
Zangherella Caporiacco, 1949

- Zangherella algerica (Simon, 1895) (type) — Italy, Algeria, Tunisia
- Zangherella apuliae (Caporiacco, 1949) — Italy, Greece, Turkey
- Zangherella relicta (Kratochvíl, 1935) — Montenegro, Bulgaria

=== Zealanapis ===
Zealanapis sp.

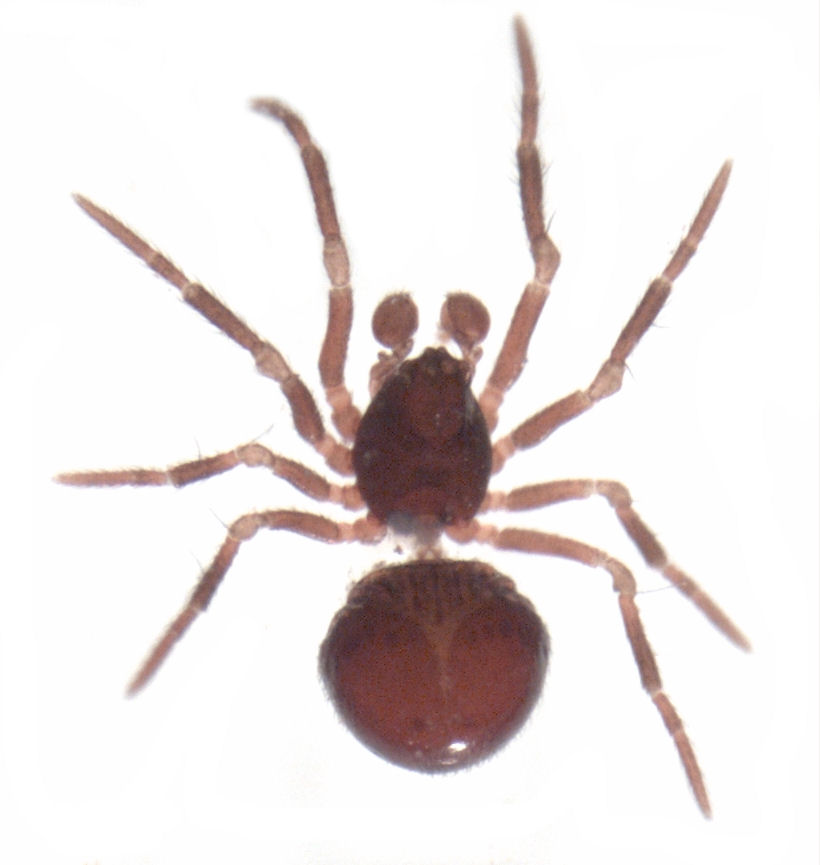
male, dorsal

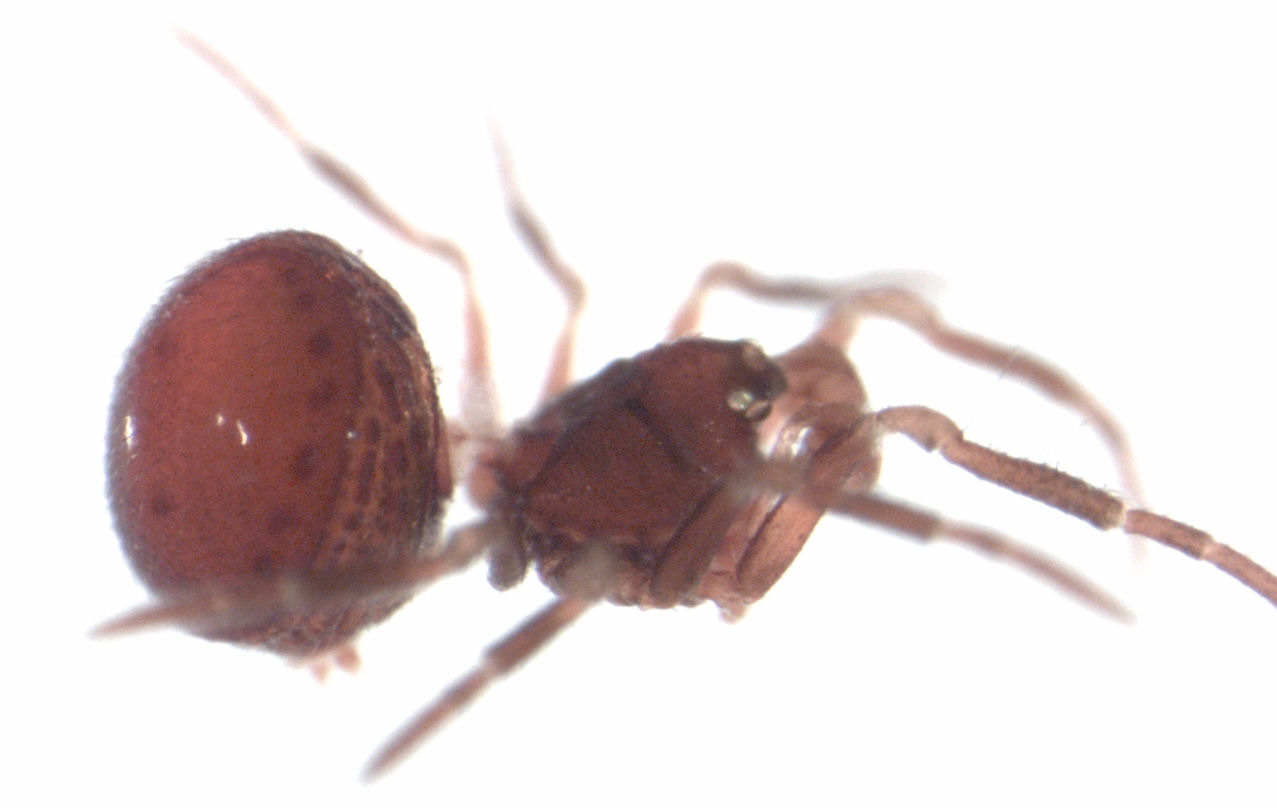
male, lateral

Zealanapis Platnick & Forster, 1989

- Zealanapis armata (Forster, 1951) (type) — New Zealand
- Zealanapis australis (Forster, 1951) — New Zealand
- Zealanapis conica (Forster, 1951) — New Zealand
- Zealanapis insula Platnick & Forster, 1989 — New Zealand
- Zealanapis kuscheli Platnick & Forster, 1989 — New Zealand
- Zealanapis matua Platnick & Forster, 1989 — New Zealand
- Zealanapis montana Platnick & Forster, 1989 — New Zealand
- Zealanapis otago Platnick & Forster, 1989 — New Zealand
- Zealanapis punta Platnick & Forster, 1989 — New Zealand
- Zealanapis waipoua Platnick & Forster, 1989 — New Zealand
