= Metanapis bimaculata =

Ground Orb-Web Spider

Scientific classification
- Kingdom: Animalia
- Phylum: Arthropoda
- Subphylum: Chelicerata
- Class: Arachnida
- Order: Araneae
- Infraorder: Araneomorphae
- Family: Anapidae
- Genus: Metanapis
- Species: M. bimaculata

Binomial name
- Metanapis bimaculata (Simon, 1895)

Synonyms
- Chasmocephalon bimaculatum Simon, 1895

Species of spider

Metanapis bimaculata is a species of spider in the family Anapidae. It is endemic to South Africa. The species was originally described in 1895 as Chasmocephalon bimaculatum by Eugène Simon before being transferred to the genus Metanapis by Paolo Marcello Brignoli in 1981.

== Etymology ==
The specific name bimaculata derives from the Latin bi- (two) and maculata (spotted), likely referring to two spots or markings on the spider.

== Distribution ==
Metanapis bimaculata has been recorded from the Western Cape province of South Africa. The original type locality was given only as "Prom. Cap. Bonae Spei" (Cape of Good Hope) with no exact locality specified. A male specimen was later illustrated by Louis Fage from Cape Town in 1937.

== Habitat ==
The species inhabits the Fynbos biome, where it constructs small orb webs in leaf litter.

== Description ==
Metanapis bimaculata is a small spider with a relatively unspecialized carapace and roundish, slightly sclerotized opisthosoma. The species exhibits the typical morphology of the genus Metanapis, with legs featuring normal femora without apophyses, elongated patellae with a single apophysis, and short tibiae that are shorter than the patellae and partially fused with the cymbium. Males possess an elongated cymbium and bulbus, with a large, more or less coiled embolus.

Both sexes are known, though only the male pedipalp has been illustrated in taxonomic literature.

== Conservation ==
The species is listed as Data Deficient due to limited distributional data. Since its original description in 1895, relatively few specimens have been collected, and more targeted microhabitat sampling is needed to determine its full range and conservation status.
