= Dippenaar =

Dippenaar is a surname, derived from the name Depner (meaning, pottery baker). The father of this surname was Johan Martin Dippenaar (1715-1790), that immigrated from Germany, to settle in Citrusdal (South Africa).

Notable people with the surname include:

- Ansie Dippenaar-Schoeman (born 1948), South African arachnologist
- Boeta Dippenaar (born 1977), South African cricketer
- Lauritz Dippenaar (born 1948), South African businessman, investor, and banker
- Stephan Dippenaar (born 1988), South African rugby union footballer

== See also ==
- Dippenaaria
