= Cenotextricella =

Cenotextricella Temporal range: Eocene

Scientific classification
- Kingdom: Animalia
- Phylum: Arthropoda
- Subphylum: Chelicerata
- Class: Arachnida
- Order: Araneae
- Infraorder: Araneomorphae
- Family: Anapidae
- Subfamily: Micropholcommatinae
- Genus: †Cenotextricella; Penney, 2007
- Species: †C. simoni

Binomial name
- †Cenotextricella simoni Penney, 2007

Extinct genus of spiders

Cenotextricella is a genus of fossil spiders with one described species, Cenotextricella simoni, found in Eocene amber (c. 53 million years ago) from the Paris Basin in France. The male is only about one millimeter long. A female has not yet been discovered. As of January 2023, it is the only fossil record of the subfamily Micropholcommatinae (now considered part of the Anapidae, but formerly recognized as a separate family). Recent species in the family only occur in the Southern Hemisphere, in Australia and South America.

The spider probably lived in semi-deciduous or deciduous woodland near a river, in a warm climate with wet and dry seasons.

Like all species of the subfamily it has eight eyes.

== Name ==
The genus name is a combination of ceno (from Cenozoic, where the type species originates), and the closely allied extant genus Textricella. The species is named in honor of famous French arachnologist Eugène Simon (1848–1924).
