= PUA =

PUA or Pua may refer to:

== Science and technology ==
- Potentially unwanted application, a type of privacy-invasive software
- Private Use Areas, in Unicode
- Pua novaezealandiae, a spider in the family Anapidae
- Pua Aloalo, Hawaiian hibiscus, the state flower of Hawaii
- Pua keni keni, Fagraea berteroana, or perfume flower tree, a small spreading tree which grows in the sub-tropics

== Other ==
- Anti-Communist Unification Party, defunct political party in Guatemala
- Malpua, an Indian dish
- Pandemic Unemployment Assistance, a type of unemployment insurance in the United States tailored specifically toward those who became unemployed due to the COVID-19 pandemic
- Pharos University in Alexandria, Egypt
- Pickup artist, individual practicing certain seduction techniques in pursuit of sexual success
- Primary urban area, definition used for comparing English cities
- Proto-Uto-Aztecan language, hypothesised reconstructed proto-language for the Uto-Aztecan language family
- Pua, Moana's pig in Moana
- Pua District, a district in Thailand
- PUA Publicaciones Universitarias Argentinas, an imprint of VDM Publishing
