= Zealanapis conica =

Conservation status
- Not Threatened (NZ TCS)

Scientific classification
- Kingdom: Animalia
- Phylum: Arthropoda
- Subphylum: Chelicerata
- Class: Arachnida
- Order: Araneae
- Infraorder: Araneomorphae
- Family: Anapidae
- Genus: Zealanapis
- Species: Z. conica

Binomial name
- Zealanapis conica (Forster, 1951)

Synonyms
- Chasmocephalon conicum Risdonius conicus

Species of spiders

Zealanapis conica is a species of Anapidae that is endemic to New Zealand.

== Taxonomy ==
This species was described as Chasmocephalon conicum in 1951 by Ray Forster from male and female specimens collected in Fiordland. In 1959 it was transferred to Risdonius. Then later in 1989 it was transferred to Zealanapis. The holotype is stored in Canterbury Museum.

== Description ==
The male is recorded at 1.06mm in length whereas the female is 0.91mm.

== Distribution ==
This species is only known from the South Island of New Zealand.

== Conservation status ==
Under the New Zealand Threat Classification System, this species is listed as "Not Threatened".
