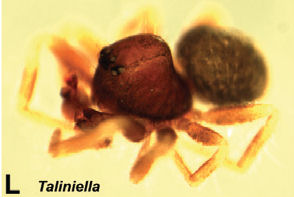

Conservation status
- Naturally Uncommon (NZ TCS)

Scientific classification
- Kingdom: Animalia
- Phylum: Arthropoda
- Subphylum: Chelicerata
- Class: Arachnida
- Order: Araneae
- Infraorder: Araneomorphae
- Family: Anapidae
- Genus: Taliniella
- Species: T. nigra

Binomial name
- Taliniella nigra (Forster, 1959)

Synonyms
- Textricella nigra

= Taliniella nigra =

Species of spider

Taliniella nigra is a species of Anapidae that is endemic to New Zealand.

== Taxonomy ==
This species was described as Textricella nigra in 1959 by Ray Forster from male and female specimens. The holotype is stored in Canterbury Museum.

== Description ==
The male is recorded at 1.21mm in length whereas the female is 1.13mm. The carapace is coloured dark brown. The legs are pale brown. The abdomen is dark bluish grey.

== Distribution ==
This species is only known from scattered localities throughout the North Island of New Zealand.

== Conservation status ==
Under the New Zealand Threat Classification System, this species is listed as "Naturally Uncommon".
