= Zangherella =

Scientific classification
- Kingdom: Animalia
- Phylum: Arthropoda
- Subphylum: Chelicerata
- Class: Arachnida
- Order: Araneae
- Infraorder: Araneomorphae
- Family: Anapidae
- Genus: Zangherella; Caporiacco, 1949

Type species
- Z. algerica (Simon, 1895)

Species
- Z. algerica (Simon, 1895) – Italy, Algeria, Tunisia; Z. apuliae (Caporiacco, 1949) – Italy, Greece, Turkey; Z. relicta (Kratochvíl, 1935) – Montenegro, Bulgaria

Genus of spiders

Zangherella is a genus of araneomorph spiders in the family Anapidae, first described by Lodovico di Caporiacco in 1949.As of October 2026 it contains only three species.
