= Taliniella vinki =

Conservation status
- Data Deficient (NZ TCS)

Scientific classification
- Domain: Eukaryota
- Kingdom: Animalia
- Phylum: Arthropoda
- Subphylum: Chelicerata
- Class: Arachnida
- Order: Araneae
- Infraorder: Araneomorphae
- Family: Anapidae
- Genus: Taliniella
- Species: T. vinki

Binomial name
- Taliniella vinki Rix & Harvey, 2010

Species of spider

Taliniella vinki is a species of Anapidae that is endemic to New Zealand.

== Taxonomy ==
This species was described in 2010 by Michael Rix and Mark Harvey from male specimens. The holotype is stored in Te Papa Museum under registration number AS.002488.

== Description ==
The male is recorded at 0.8mm in length. The cephalothorax and abdomen is coloured brown. The legs are dark tan yellow.

== Distribution ==
This species is only known from Christchurch, New Zealand.

== Conservation status ==
Under the New Zealand Threat Classification System, this species is listed as "Data Deficient" with the qualifiers of "Data Poor: Size", "Data Poor:Trend" and "One Location".
