= Anapis =

Scientific classification
- Kingdom: Animalia
- Phylum: Arthropoda
- Subphylum: Chelicerata
- Class: Arachnida
- Order: Araneae
- Infraorder: Araneomorphae
- Family: Anapidae
- Genus: Anapis; Simon, 1895

Type species
- A. hetschki (Keyserling, 1886)

Species
- 29, see text

Synonyms
- Epecthina; Epecthinula

Genus of spiders

Anapis is a genus of araneomorph spiders in the family Anapidae, which consists of small orb weaving spiders all from the Neotropical realm. The genus includes close to thirty species and was first described by Eugène Simon in 1895.

== Species ==
As of October 2026 it contains twenty-nine species:

- Anapis amazonas Platnick & Shadab, 1978 – Colombia
- Anapis anabelleae Dupérré & Tapia, 2018 – Ecuador
- Anapis anchicaya Platnick & Shadab, 1978 – Colombia
- Anapis atuncela Platnick & Shadab, 1978 – Colombia
- Anapis calima Platnick & Shadab, 1978 – Colombia
- Anapis caluga Platnick & Shadab, 1978 – Peru
- Anapis carmencita Dupérré & Tapia, 2018 – Ecuador
- Anapis castilla Platnick & Shadab, 1978 – Peru, Brazil
- Anapis chiriboga Platnick & Shadab, 1978 – Ecuador
- Anapis choroni Platnick & Shadab, 1978 – Venezuela
- Anapis churu Dupérré & Tapia, 2018 – Ecuador
- Anapis circinata (Simon, 1895) – Venezuela
- Anapis digua Platnick & Shadab, 1978 – Colombia
- Anapis discoidalis (Balogh & Loksa, 1968) – Brazil
- Anapis felidia Platnick & Shadab, 1978 – Colombia
- Anapis guasca Platnick & Shadab, 1978 – Colombia
- Anapis heredia Platnick & Shadab, 1978 – Costa Rica
- Anapis hetschki (Keyserling, 1886) – Brazil
- Anapis keyserlingi Gertsch, 1941 – Panama
- Anapis mariebertheae Dupérré & Tapia, 2018 – Ecuador
- Anapis meta Platnick & Shadab, 1978 – Colombia
- Anapis mexicana Forster, 1958 – Mexico, Belize
- Anapis minutissima (Simon, 1903) – Jamaica
- Anapis monteverde Platnick & Shadab, 1978 – Costa Rica
- Anapis naranja Dupérré & Tapia, 2018 – Ecuador
- Anapis nawchi Dupérré & Tapia, 2018 – Ecuador
- Anapis nevada Müller, 1987 – Colombia
- Anapis saladito Platnick & Shadab, 1978 – Colombia
- Anapis shina Dupérré & Tapia, 2018 – Ecuador
