= Plectochetos =

Scientific classification
- Kingdom: Animalia
- Phylum: Arthropoda
- Subphylum: Chelicerata
- Class: Arachnida
- Order: Araneae
- Infraorder: Araneomorphae
- Family: Anapidae
- Genus: Plectochetos; Butler, 1932
- Species: P. longisissimus

Binomial name
- Plectochetos longisissimus Butler, 1932

Synonyms
- Micropholcomma longissimum Butler, 1932

Genus of spiders

Plectochetos is a genus of Anapidae first described by Butler in 1932, found from Queensland (Australia) to Tasmania.

It was removed from the synonym of Micropholcomma Crosby & Bishop, 1927 by Eskov and Marusik, 2024.
