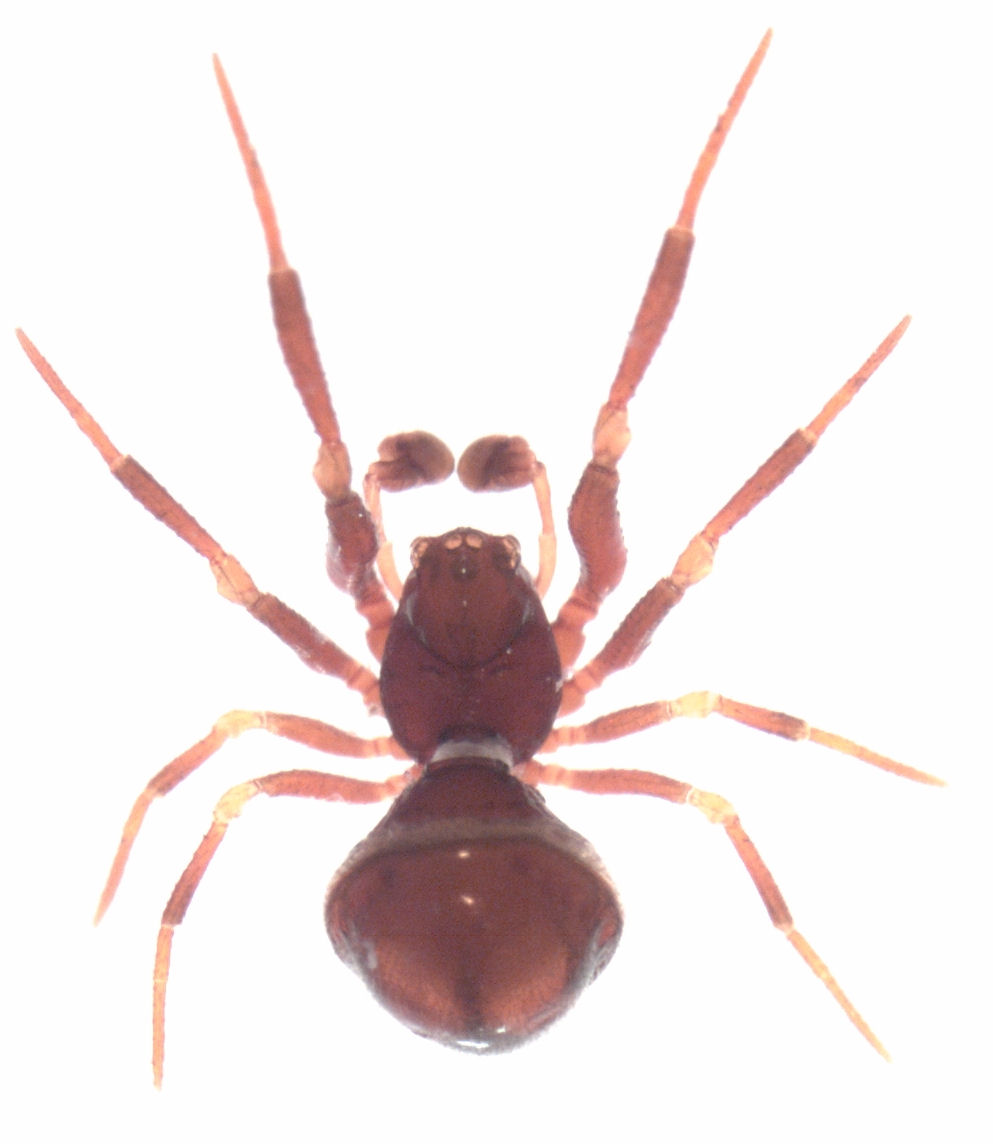

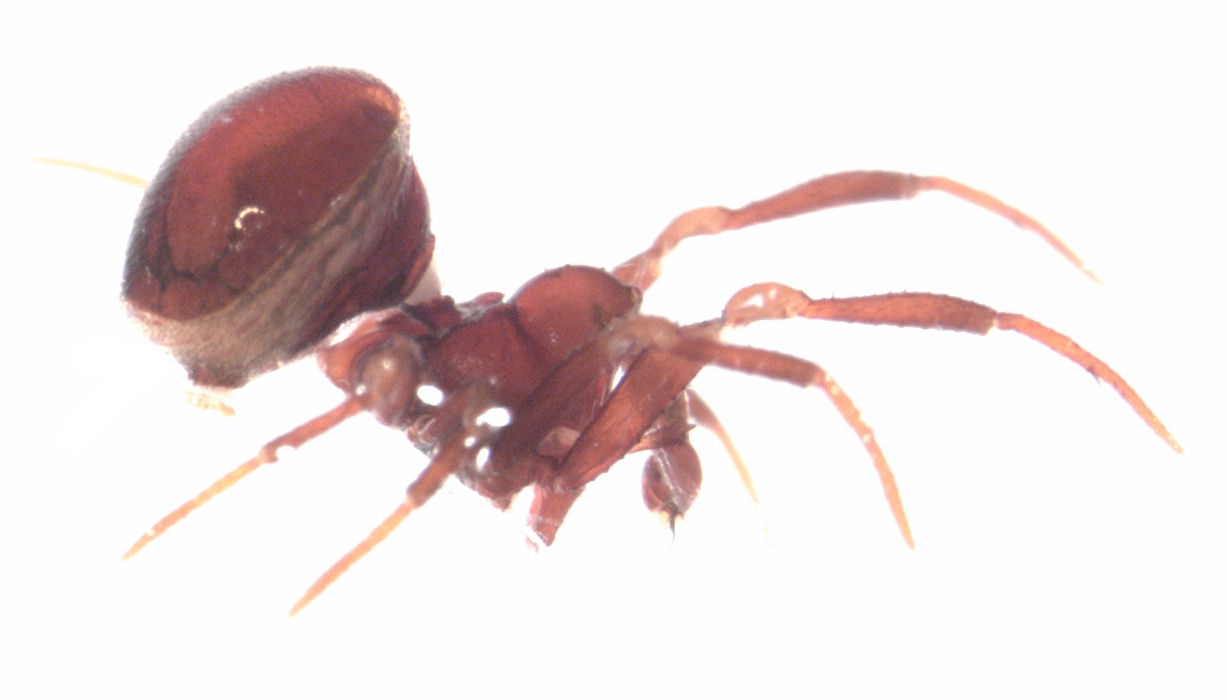
- Navanapis spinipes, male

Conservation status
- Not Threatened (NZ TCS)

Scientific classification
- Kingdom: Animalia
- Phylum: Arthropoda
- Subphylum: Chelicerata
- Class: Arachnida
- Order: Araneae
- Infraorder: Araneomorphae
- Family: Anapidae
- Genus: Novanapis; Platnick & Forster, 1989
- Species: N. spinipes

Binomial name
- Novanapis spinipes (Forster, 1951)

Synonyms
- Chasmocephalon spinipes Pseudanapis spinipes

= Novanapis =

Genus of spiders

Novanapis is a genus of South Pacific araneomorph spiders in the family Anapidae, containing the single species, Novanapis spinipes. It was first described by Norman I. Platnick & Raymond Robert Forster in 1989, and has only been found in New Zealand.

== Taxonomy ==
This species was described as Chasmocephalon spinipes in 1951 by Ray Forster from male and female specimens. It was later transferred to Pseudanapis in 1959. The species was given its own genus name by Norman Platnick and Ray Forster in 1989. The holotype is stored in Canterbury Museum.

== Description ==
The male is recorded at 1.48mm in length whereas the female is 1.49mm. This species is coloured dark brown.

== Distribution ==
This species is known from the North Island and most of the South Island of New Zealand.

== Conservation status ==
Under the New Zealand Threat Classification System, this species is listed as "Not Threatened".
