= Tasmanapis =

Scientific classification
- Kingdom: Animalia
- Phylum: Arthropoda
- Subphylum: Chelicerata
- Class: Arachnida
- Order: Araneae
- Infraorder: Araneomorphae
- Family: Anapidae
- Genus: Tasmanapis
- Species: T. strahan

Binomial name
- Tasmanapis strahan Platnick & Forster, 1989

Genus of spiders

Tasmanapis is a genus of Australian araneomorph spiders in the family Anapidae, containing the single species, Tasmanapis strahan. It was first described by Norman I. Platnick & Raymond Robert Forster in 1989, and has only been found in Australia.
