= Normplatnicka =

Scientific classification
- Kingdom: Animalia
- Phylum: Arthropoda
- Subphylum: Chelicerata
- Class: Arachnida
- Order: Araneae
- Infraorder: Araneomorphae
- Family: Anapidae
- Genus: Normplatnicka; Harvey

Species
- Normplatnicka barrettae Rix & Harvey, 2010; Normplatnicka chilensis Rix & Harvey, 2010; Normplatnicka lamingtonensis (Forster, 1959)

Genus of spiders

Normplatnicka is a genus of spiders in the family Anapidae. It was first described in 2010 by Rix & Harvey. Two of its described species are endemic to Australia, the other in Chile.

== Etymology ==
The genus name honors Norman Platnick.

== Species ==
As of October 2026, this genus includes three species:

- Normplatnicka barrettae Rix & Harvey, 2010 – Australia (Western Australia)
- Normplatnicka chilensis Rix & Harvey, 2010 – Chile
- Normplatnicka lamingtonensis (Forster, 1959) – Australia (Queensland, New South Wales, Victoria)
