= Pecanapis =

Scientific classification
- Kingdom: Animalia
- Phylum: Arthropoda
- Subphylum: Chelicerata
- Class: Arachnida
- Order: Araneae
- Infraorder: Araneomorphae
- Family: Anapidae
- Genus: Pecanapis
- Species: P. franckei

Binomial name
- Pecanapis franckei Platnick & Forster, 1989

Genus of spiders

Pecanapis is a genus of South American araneomorph spiders in the family Anapidae, containing the single species, Pecanapis franckei. It was first described by Norman I. Platnick & Raymond Robert Forster in 1989, and has only been found in Chile.
