= Patelliella =

Scientific classification
- Kingdom: Animalia
- Phylum: Arthropoda
- Subphylum: Chelicerata
- Class: Arachnida
- Order: Araneae
- Infraorder: Araneomorphae
- Family: Anapidae
- Genus: Patelliella
- Species: P. adusta

Binomial name
- Patelliella adusta Rix & Harvey, 2010

Genus of spiders

Patelliella is a genus of spiders in the family Anapidae. It was first described in 2010 by Rix & Harvey. As of 2026, it contains only one species, Patelliella adusta, found on Lord Howe Island.
