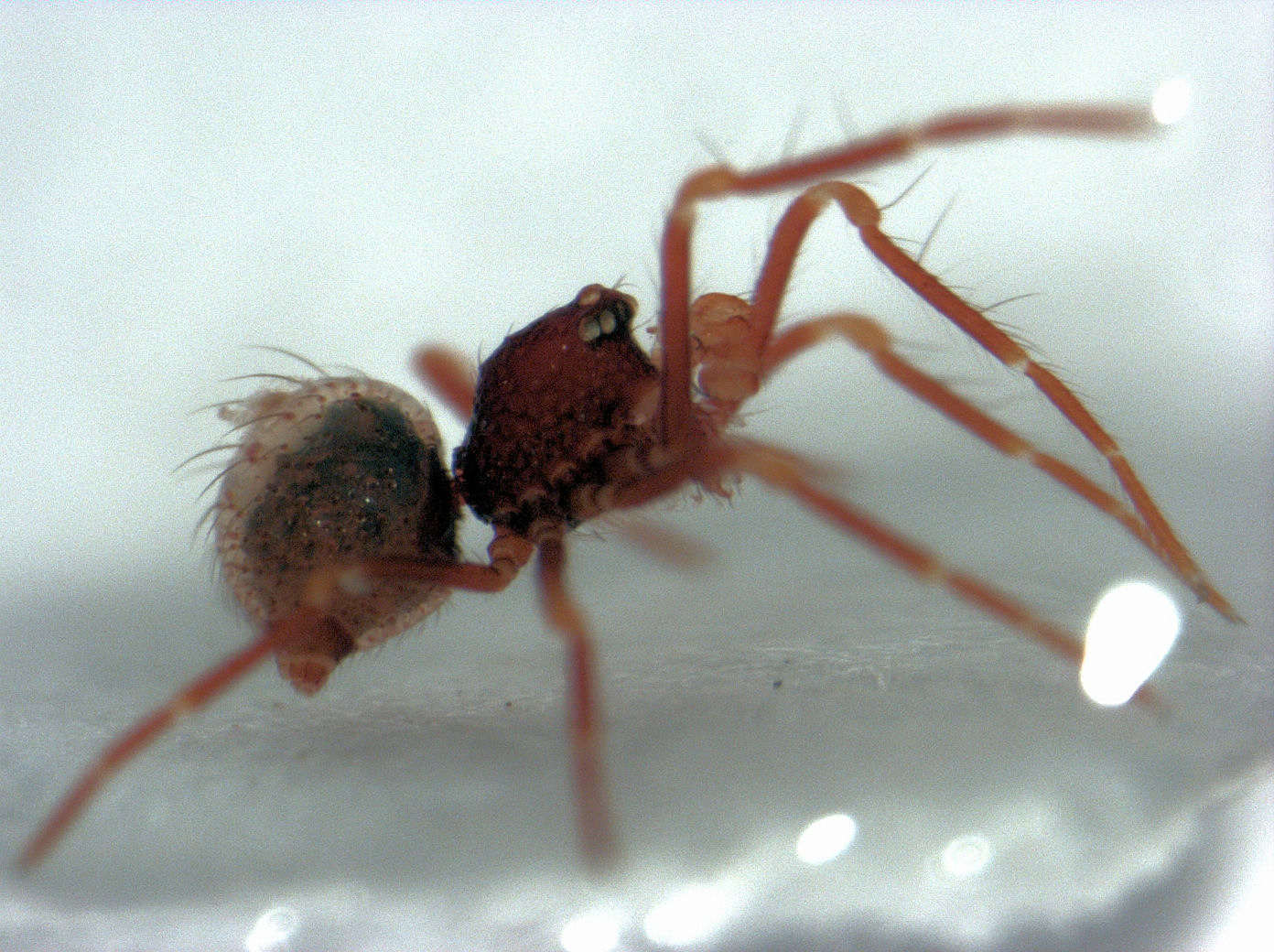
- Parapua punctata

Scientific classification
- Kingdom: Animalia
- Phylum: Arthropoda
- Subphylum: Chelicerata
- Class: Arachnida
- Order: Araneae
- Infraorder: Araneomorphae
- Family: Anapidae
- Subfamily: Micropholcommatinae; Hickman, 1943

= Micropholcommatinae =

Subfamily of spiders

The Micropholcommatinae are a subfamily of araneomorph spiders in the family Anapidae. They were previously treated as the family Micropholcommatidae. Micropholcommatins are extremely small, with body lengths typically between 0.5 and 2 mm. They are usually found among leaf litter or moss.

== Distribution ==
Many genera are endemic to New Zealand and Australia, with others found also in South America.

== Taxonomy ==
The families Micropholcommatidae and Textricellidae were synonymized with the Symphytognathidae by Forster in 1959, but again split from it in 1977. Later they were considered to be only one family, namely Micropholcommatidae, by Platnick & Forster in 1986. They were synonymized with Anapidae by Schütt in 2003 and by Lopa et al. in 2011, a change that has been accepted by the World Spider Catalog.
