= Gertschanapis =

Scientific classification
- Kingdom: Animalia
- Phylum: Arthropoda
- Subphylum: Chelicerata
- Class: Arachnida
- Order: Araneae
- Infraorder: Araneomorphae
- Family: Anapidae
- Genus: Gertschanapis; Platnick & Forster, 1990
- Species: G. shantzi

Binomial name
- Gertschanapis shantzi Platnick & Forster, 1990

Genus of spiders

Gertschanapis is a genus of North American araneomorph spiders in the family Anapidae, containing the single species, Gertschanapis shantzi. It was first described by Norman I. Platnick & Raymond Robert Forster in 1990, and has only been found in United States.
