= Sheranapis =

Scientific classification
- Kingdom: Animalia
- Phylum: Arthropoda
- Subphylum: Chelicerata
- Class: Arachnida
- Order: Araneae
- Infraorder: Araneomorphae
- Family: Anapidae
- Genus: Sheranapis; Platnick & Forster, 1989

Type species
- S. bellavista Platnick & Forster, 1989

Species
- S. bellavista Platnick & Forster, 1989 – Chile; S. quellon Platnick & Forster, 1989 – Chile; S. villarrica Platnick & Forster, 1989 – Chile

Genus of spiders

Sheranapis is a genus of South American araneomorph spiders in the family Anapidae, first described by Norman I. Platnick & Raymond Robert Forster in 1989. As of October 2026 it contains only three species, all found in Chile.
