= Eterosonycha =

Scientific classification
- Kingdom: Animalia
- Phylum: Arthropoda
- Subphylum: Chelicerata
- Class: Arachnida
- Order: Araneae
- Infraorder: Araneomorphae
- Family: Anapidae
- Genus: Eterosonycha; Butler

Species
- Eterosonycha alpina Butler, 1932; Eterosonycha aquilina Rix & Harvey, 2010; Eterosonycha complexa (Forster, 1959); Eterosonycha ocellata Rix & Harvey, 2010

Genus of spiders

Eterosonycha is a genus of spiders in the family, Anapidae. It was first described in 1932, by Butler. As of 2026, it contains 4 Australian species.
