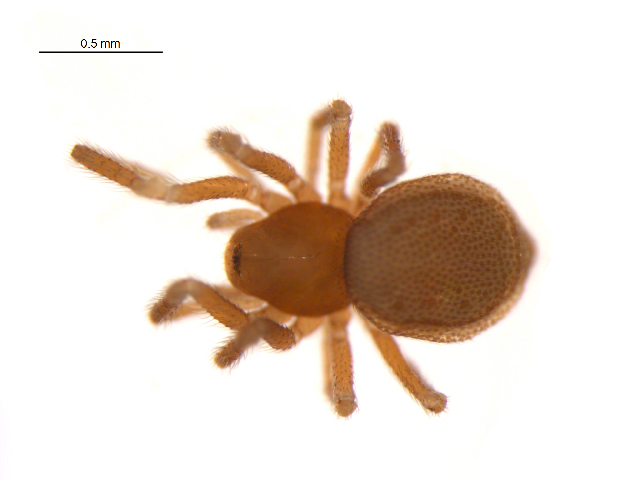
- C. mendocino, adult female

Scientific classification
- Kingdom: Animalia
- Phylum: Arthropoda
- Subphylum: Chelicerata
- Class: Arachnida
- Order: Araneae
- Infraorder: Araneomorphae
- Family: Anapidae
- Genus: Comaroma; Bertkau, 1889

Type species
- C. simoni Bertkau, 1889

Species
- 6, see text

= Comaroma =

Genus of spiders

Comaroma is a genus of araneomorph spiders in the family Anapidae, first described by Philipp Bertkau in 1889.

== Species ==
As of October 2026 it contains six species:

- Comaroma hatsushibai Ono, 2005 – Japan
- Comaroma maculosa Oi, 1960 – China, Korea, Japan
- Comaroma mendocino (Levi, 1957) – USA
- Comaroma nakahirai (Yaginuma, 1959) – Japan
- Comaroma simoni Bertkau, 1889 – Europe
- Comaroma tongjunca Zhang & Chen, 1994 – China
