= Pseudanapis =

Scientific classification
- Kingdom: Animalia
- Phylum: Arthropoda
- Subphylum: Chelicerata
- Class: Arachnida
- Order: Araneae
- Infraorder: Araneomorphae
- Family: Anapidae
- Genus: Pseudanapis; Simon, 1905

Type species
- P. parocula (Simon, 1899)

Species
- 12, see text

Synonyms
- Amrishoonops; Gossiblemma

Genus of spiders

Pseudanapis is a genus of araneomorph spiders in the family Anapidae, first described by Eugène Simon in 1905. It is a senior synonym of "Gossiblemma" and "Amrishoonops".

== Species ==
As of October 2026 it contains twelve species:

- Pseudanapis aloha Forster, 1959 – Japan, Hawaii, Caroline Is., Australia (Queensland). Introduced to Britain, Germany
- Pseudanapis amrishi (Makhan & Ezzatpanah, 2011) – Suriname
- Pseudanapis benoiti Platnick & Shadab, 1979 – Congo
- Pseudanapis domingo Platnick & Shadab, 1979 – Ecuador
- Pseudanapis gertschi (Forster, 1958) – Mexico, Costa Rica, Panama
- Pseudanapis hoeferi Kropf, 1995 – Brazil
- Pseudanapis namkhan Lin, Li & Jäger, 2013 – Laos
- Pseudanapis parocula (Simon, 1899) – Laos, Malaysia, Indonesia (Sumatra, Java)
- Pseudanapis plumbea Forster, 1974 – Congo
- Pseudanapis schauenbergi Brignoli, 1981 – Mauritius, Réunion
- Pseudanapis serica Brignoli, 1981 – China (Hong Kong)
- Pseudanapis wilsoni Forster, 1959 – New Guinea
