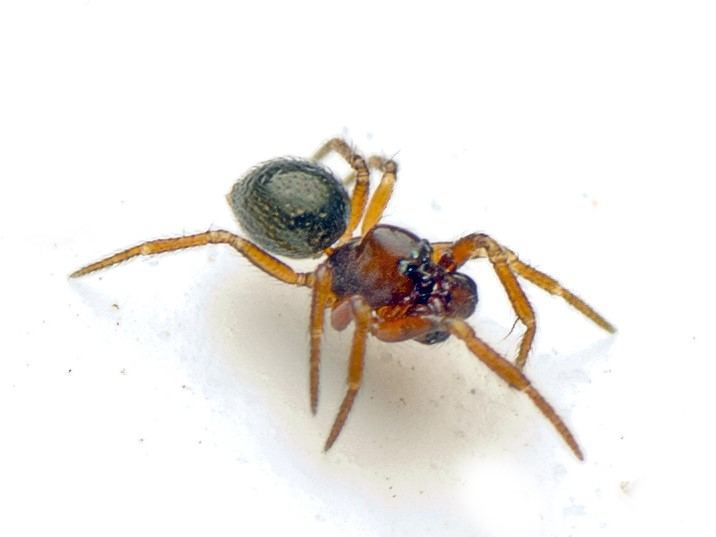
- Raveniella luteola

Scientific classification
- Kingdom: Animalia
- Phylum: Arthropoda
- Subphylum: Chelicerata
- Class: Arachnida
- Order: Araneae
- Infraorder: Araneomorphae
- Family: Anapidae
- Genus: Raveniella; Harvey

Type species
- Raveniella luteola

Species
- 9, see text

= Raveniella =

Genus of spiders

Raveniella is a genus of spiders in the family Anapidae. It was first described in 2010 by Rix & Harvey. As of 2026, it contains 9 Australian species.

== Species ==
Raveniella comprises the following species:

- Raveniella apopsis Rix & Harvey, 2010
- Raveniella arenacea Rix & Harvey, 2010
- Raveniella cirrata Rix & Harvey, 2010
- Raveniella hickmani (Forster, 1959)
- Raveniella janineae Rix & Harvey, 2010
- Raveniella luteola (Hickman, 1945)
- Raveniella mucronata Rix & Harvey, 2010
- Raveniella peckorum Rix & Harvey, 2010
- Raveniella subcirrata Rix & Harvey, 2010
