= Caledanapis =

Scientific classification
- Kingdom: Animalia
- Phylum: Arthropoda
- Subphylum: Chelicerata
- Class: Arachnida
- Order: Araneae
- Infraorder: Araneomorphae
- Family: Anapidae
- Genus: Caledanapis; Platnick & Forster, 1989

Type species
- C. peckorum Platnick & Forster, 1989

Species
- 6, see text

Genus of spiders

Caledanapis is a genus of South Pacific araneomorph spiders in the family Anapidae, first described by Norman I. Platnick & Raymond Robert Forster in 1989.

== Species ==
As of October 2026 it contains six species, all found on New Caledonia:

- Caledanapis dzumac Platnick & Forster, 1989 – New Caledonia
- Caledanapis insolita (Berland, 1924) – New Caledonia
- Caledanapis peckorum Platnick & Forster, 1989 – New Caledonia
- Caledanapis pilupilu (Brignoli, 1981) – New Caledonia
- Caledanapis sera Platnick & Forster, 1989 – New Caledonia
- Caledanapis tillierorum Platnick & Forster, 1989 – New Caledonia
