= Enielkenie =

Scientific classification
- Kingdom: Animalia
- Phylum: Arthropoda
- Subphylum: Chelicerata
- Class: Arachnida
- Order: Araneae
- Infraorder: Araneomorphae
- Family: Anapidae
- Genus: Enielkenie
- Species: E. acaroides

Binomial name
- Enielkenie acaroides Ono, 2007

Genus of spiders

Enielkenie is a genus of East Asian araneomorph spiders in the family Anapidae, containing the single species, Enielkenie acaroides. It was first described by H. Ono, Y. H. Chang & I. M. Tso in 2007, and has only been found in Taiwan.
