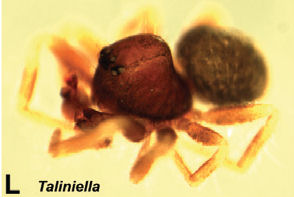
- Taliniella nigra

Scientific classification
- Kingdom: Animalia
- Phylum: Arthropoda
- Subphylum: Chelicerata
- Class: Arachnida
- Order: Araneae
- Infraorder: Araneomorphae
- Family: Anapidae
- Genus: Taliniella; Rix & Harvey, 2010

Species
- Taliniella nigra (Forster, 1959); Taliniella vinki Rix & Harvey, 2010

= Taliniella =

Genus of spiders

Taliniella is a genus of spiders in the family Anapidae. It was first described in 2010 by Rix & Harvey. As of 2026, it contains 2 species, both from New Zealand.
