= Olgania =

Scientific classification
- Kingdom: Animalia
- Phylum: Arthropoda
- Subphylum: Chelicerata
- Class: Arachnida
- Order: Araneae
- Infraorder: Araneomorphae
- Family: Anapidae
- Genus: Olgania; Hickman

Species
- Olgania cracroft Rix & Harvey, 2010; Olgania eberhardi Rix & Harvey, 2010; Olgania excavata Hickman, 1979; Olgania troglodytes Rix & Harvey, 2010; Olgania weld Rix & Harvey, 2010

Genus of spiders

Olgania is a genus of spiders in the family Anapidae. It was first described in 1979 by Hickman. As of 2026, it contains 5 species, all found in Tasmania.
