= Tricellina =

Scientific classification
- Kingdom: Animalia
- Phylum: Arthropoda
- Subphylum: Chelicerata
- Class: Arachnida
- Order: Araneae
- Infraorder: Araneomorphae
- Family: Anapidae
- Genus: Tricellina
- Species: T. gertschi

Binomial name
- Tricellina gertschi (Forster & Platnick, 1981)

Genus of spiders

Tricellina is a genus of spiders in the family Anapidae. It was first described in 1989 by Forster & Platnick. As of 2026, it contains only one species, Tricellina gertschi, found in Chile.
