= Hickmanapis =

Scientific classification
- Kingdom: Animalia
- Phylum: Arthropoda
- Subphylum: Chelicerata
- Class: Arachnida
- Order: Araneae
- Infraorder: Araneomorphae
- Family: Anapidae
- Genus: Hickmanapis; Platnick & Forster, 1989

Type species
- H. renison Platnick & Forster, 1989

Species
- H. minuta (Hickman, 1944) – Australia (Tasmania); H. renison Platnick & Forster, 1989 – Australia (Tasmania)

Genus of spiders

Hickmanapis is a genus of Australian araneomorph spiders in the family Anapidae, first described by Norman I. Platnick & Raymond Robert Forster in 1989. As of October 2026 it contains only two species.
