= Acrobleps =

Scientific classification
- Domain: Eukaryota
- Kingdom: Animalia
- Phylum: Arthropoda
- Subphylum: Chelicerata
- Class: Arachnida
- Order: Araneae
- Infraorder: Araneomorphae
- Family: Anapidae
- Genus: Acrobleps
- Species: A. hygrophilus

Binomial name
- Acrobleps hygrophilus Hickman, 1979

Genus of spiders

Acrobleps is a genus of Australian araneomorph spiders in the family Anapidae, containing the single species, Acrobleps hygrophilus. It was first described by V. V. Hickman in 1979, and has only been found in Australia.
