= Teutoniella =

Scientific classification
- Kingdom: Animalia
- Phylum: Arthropoda
- Subphylum: Chelicerata
- Class: Arachnida
- Order: Araneae
- Infraorder: Araneomorphae
- Family: Anapidae
- Genus: Teutoniella; Brignoli

Species
- Teutoniella cekalovici Platnick & Forster, 1986; Teutoniella plaumanni Brignoli, 1981

Genus of spiders

Teutoniella is a genus of spiders in the family Anapidae. It was first described in 1981 by Paolo Brignoli.

== Species ==
As of October 2026, this genus includes two species:

- Teutoniella cekalovici Platnick & Forster, 1986 – Chile
- Teutoniella plaumanni Brignoli, 1981 – Brazil
