= Metanapis =

Scientific classification
- Kingdom: Animalia
- Phylum: Arthropoda
- Subphylum: Chelicerata
- Class: Arachnida
- Order: Araneae
- Infraorder: Araneomorphae
- Family: Anapidae
- Genus: Metanapis; Brignoli, 1981

Type species
- M. mahnerti Brignoli, 1981

Species
- 5, see text

Genus of spiders

Metanapis is a genus of araneomorph spiders in the family Anapidae, first described by Paolo Brignoli in 1981.

== Species ==
As of October 2026 it contains five species:

- Metanapis bimaculata (Simon, 1895) – South Africa
- Metanapis mahnerti Brignoli, 1981 – Kenya
- Metanapis montisemodi (Brignoli, 1978) – Nepal
- Metanapis plutella (Forster, 1974) – Congo
- Metanapis tectimundi (Brignoli, 1978) – Nepal
