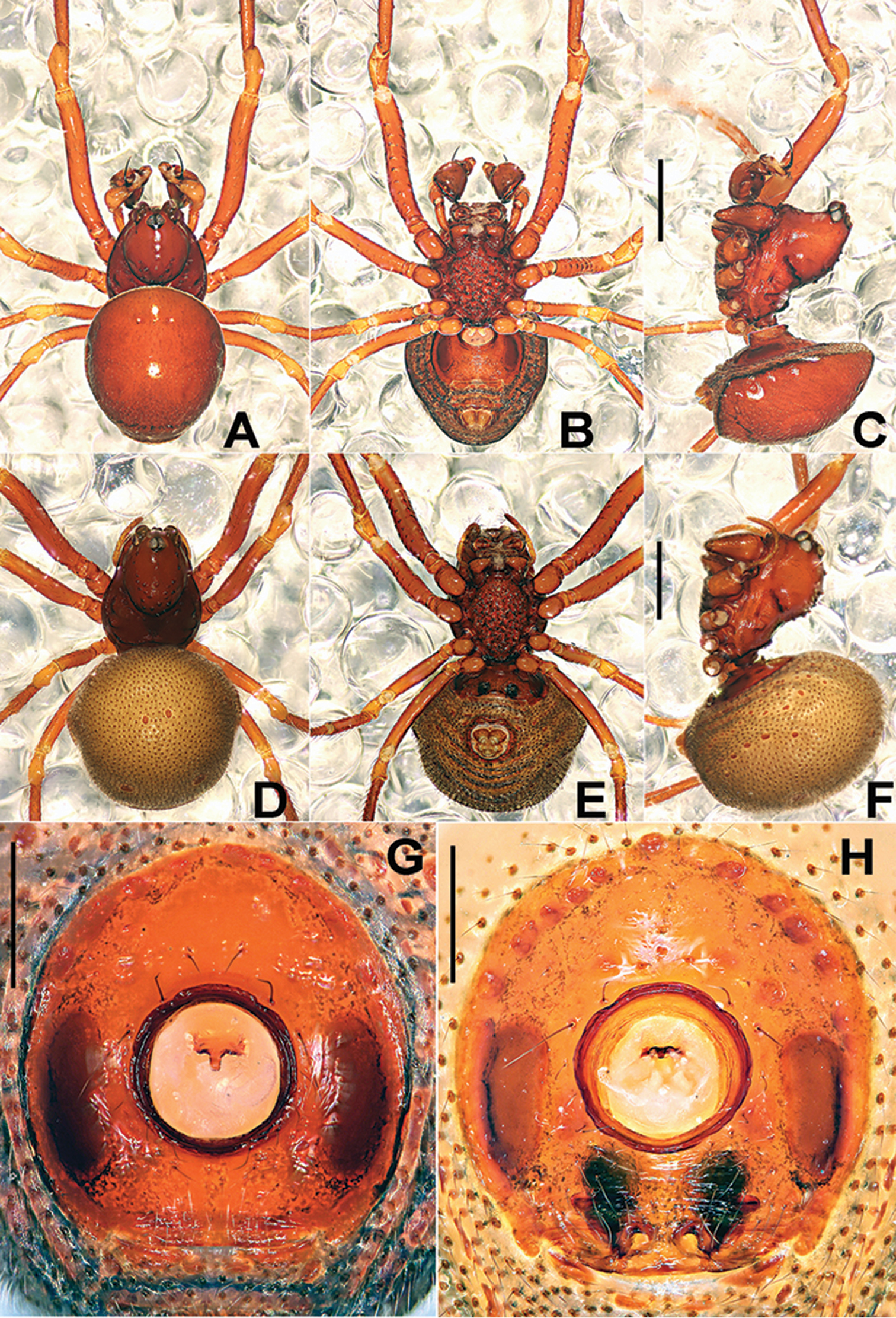
- Sinanapis wuyi

Scientific classification
- Kingdom: Animalia
- Phylum: Arthropoda
- Subphylum: Chelicerata
- Class: Arachnida
- Order: Araneae
- Infraorder: Araneomorphae
- Family: Anapidae
- Genus: Sinanapis; Wunderlich & Song, 1995

Type species
- S. crassitarsa Wunderlich & Song, 1995

Species
- 4, see text

= Sinanapis =

Genus of spiders

Sinanapis is a genus of Asian araneomorph spiders in the family Anapidae, first described by J. Wunderlich & D. X. Song in 1995.

== Species ==
As of October 2026 it contains four species:

- Sinanapis crassitarsa Wunderlich & Song, 1995 – China, Laos, Vietnam
- Sinanapis longituba Lin & Li, 2012 – China (Hainan)
- Sinanapis medogensis Zhang & Lin, 2018 – China
- Sinanapis wuyi Jin & Zhang, 2013 – China
