= Crassanapis =

Scientific classification
- Kingdom: Animalia
- Phylum: Arthropoda
- Subphylum: Chelicerata
- Class: Arachnida
- Order: Araneae
- Infraorder: Araneomorphae
- Family: Anapidae
- Genus: Crassanapis; Platnick & Forster, 1989

Type species
- C. chilensis Platnick & Forster, 1989

Species
- 5, see text

Genus of spiders

Crassanapis is a genus of South American araneomorph spiders in the family Anapidae, first described by Norman I. Platnick & Raymond Robert Forster in 1989.

== Species ==
As of October 2026 it contains five species:

- Crassanapis calderoni Platnick & Forster, 1989 – Chile
- Crassanapis cekalovici Platnick & Forster, 1989 – Chile, Argentina
- Crassanapis chaiten Platnick & Forster, 1989 – Chile
- Crassanapis chilensis Platnick & Forster, 1989 – Chile
- Crassanapis contulmo Platnick & Forster, 1989 – Chile
