= Spinanapis =

Scientific classification
- Kingdom: Animalia
- Phylum: Arthropoda
- Subphylum: Chelicerata
- Class: Arachnida
- Order: Araneae
- Infraorder: Araneomorphae
- Family: Anapidae
- Genus: Spinanapis; Platnick & Forster, 1989

Type species
- S. ker Platnick & Forster, 1989

Species
- 9, see text

Genus of spiders

Spinanapis is a genus of Australian araneomorph spiders in the family Anapidae, first described by Norman I. Platnick & Raymond Robert Forster in 1989.

== Species ==
As of October 2026 it contains nine species:

- Spinanapis darlingtoni (Forster, 1959) – Australia (Queensland)
- Spinanapis frere Platnick & Forster, 1989 – Australia (Queensland)
- Spinanapis julatten Platnick & Forster, 1989 – Australia (Queensland)
- Spinanapis ker Platnick & Forster, 1989 – Australia (Queensland)
- Spinanapis lewis Platnick & Forster, 1989 – Australia (Queensland)
- Spinanapis monteithi Platnick & Forster, 1989 – Australia (Queensland)
- Spinanapis thompsoni Platnick & Forster, 1989 – Australia (Queensland)
- Spinanapis thornton Platnick & Forster, 1989 – Australia (Queensland)
- Spinanapis yeatesi Platnick & Forster, 1989 – Australia (Queensland)
