= Micropholcomma =

Scientific classification
- Kingdom: Animalia
- Phylum: Arthropoda
- Subphylum: Chelicerata
- Class: Arachnida
- Order: Araneae
- Infraorder: Araneomorphae
- Family: Anapidae
- Genus: Micropholcomma; Bishop

Type species
- Micropholcomma caeligenum

Species
- 8, see text

Genus of spiders

Micropholcomma is a genus of spiders in the family Anapidae. It was first described in 1927 by Crosby & Bishop. As of 2017, it contains 8 Australian species.

M. longissimum was moved to genus Plectochetos in 2024.

== Species ==
As of October 2026, this genus includes seven species:

- Micropholcomma bryophilum (Butler, 1932) – Australia (Queensland to Tasmania)
- Micropholcomma caeligena Crosby & Bishop, 1927 – Australia (Victoria) (type species)
- Micropholcomma junee Rix & Harvey, 2010 – Australia (Tasmania)
- Micropholcomma linnaei Rix, 2008 – Australia (Western Australia)
- Micropholcomma mirum Hickman, 1944 – Australia (Tasmania)
- Micropholcomma parmatum Hickman, 1944 – Australia (Tasmania)
- Micropholcomma turbans Hickman, 1981 – Australia (Tasmania)
