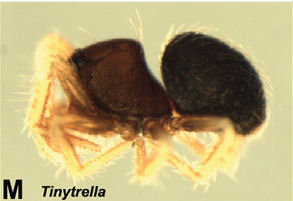

Conservation status
- Not Threatened (NZ TCS)

Scientific classification
- Kingdom: Animalia
- Phylum: Arthropoda
- Subphylum: Chelicerata
- Class: Arachnida
- Order: Araneae
- Infraorder: Araneomorphae
- Family: Anapidae
- Genus: Tinytrella
- Species: T. pusilla

Binomial name
- Tinytrella pusilla (Forster, 1959)

= Tinytrella =

Genus of spiders

Tinytrella is a genus of spiders in the family Anapidae. It was first described in 2010 by Rix & Harvey. As of 2026, it contains only one species, Tinytrella pusilla, found in New Zealand.

== Taxonomy ==
This species was described by Ray Forster in 1959 from male and female specimens. The species named was most to Tinytrella, a genus created just for this species. The holotype is stored in Canterbury Museum.

== Description ==
The male is recorded at 0.85mm in length whereas the female is 0.89mm.

== Distribution ==
This species is known from scattered localities throughout New Zealand.

== Conservation status ==
Under the New Zealand Threat Classification System, this species is listed as "Not Threatened".
