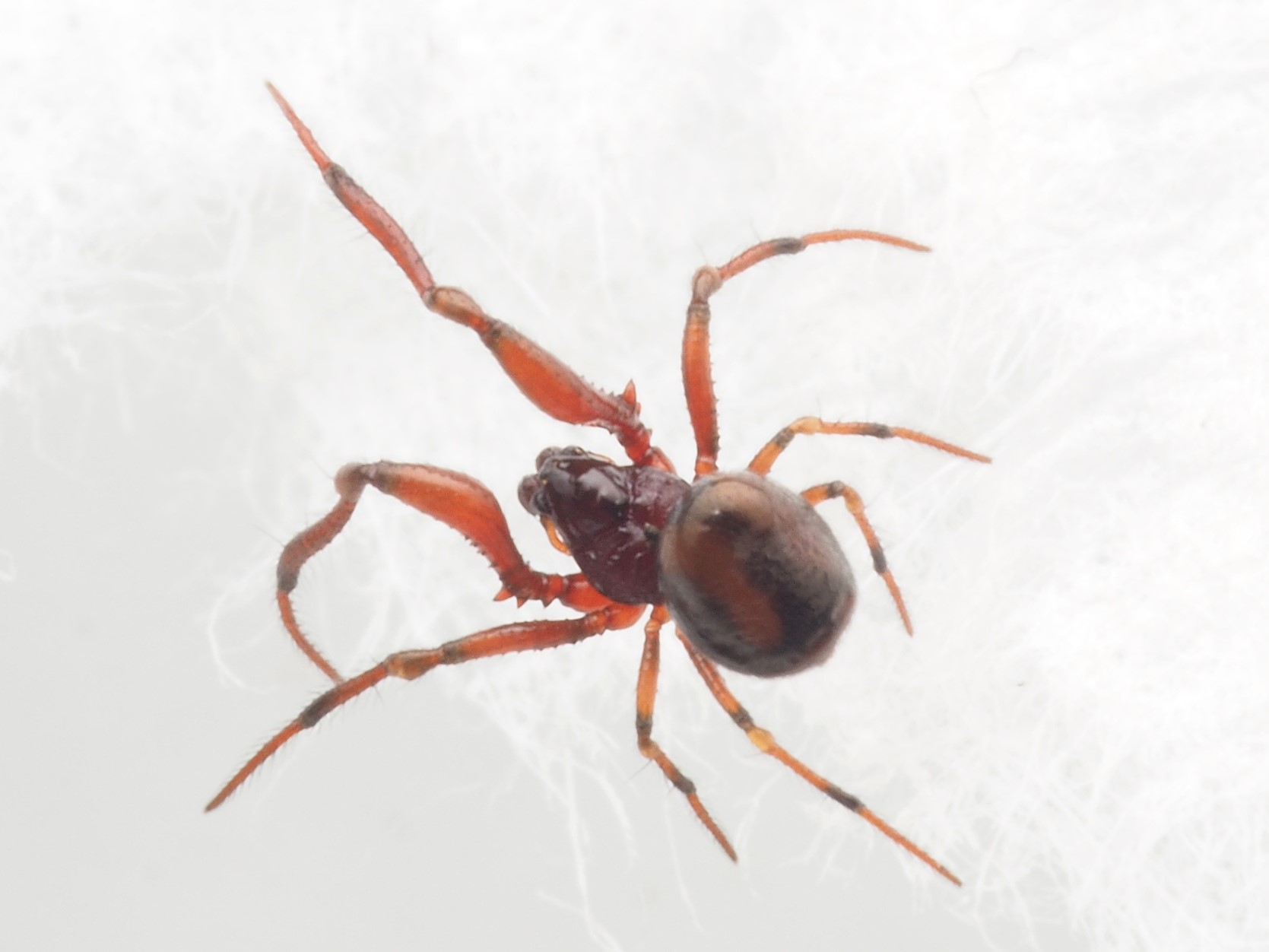
- Maxanapis crassifemoralis

Scientific classification
- Kingdom: Animalia
- Phylum: Arthropoda
- Subphylum: Chelicerata
- Class: Arachnida
- Order: Araneae
- Infraorder: Araneomorphae
- Family: Anapidae
- Genus: Maxanapis; Platnick & Forster, 1989

Type species
- M. bartle Platnick & Forster, 1989

Species
- 9, see text

= Maxanapis =

Genus of spiders

Maxanapis is a genus of Australian araneomorph spiders in the family Anapidae, first described by Norman I. Platnick & Raymond Robert Forster in 1989.

== Species ==
As of October 2026 it contains nine species:

- Maxanapis bartle Platnick & Forster, 1989 – Australia (Queensland)
- Maxanapis bell Platnick & Forster, 1989 – Australia (Queensland)
- Maxanapis bellenden Platnick & Forster, 1989 – Australia (Queensland)
- Maxanapis burra (Forster, 1959) – Australia (Queensland, New South Wales)
- Maxanapis crassifemoralis (Wunderlich, 1976) – Australia (Queensland, New South Wales)
- Maxanapis dorrigo Platnick & Forster, 1989 – Australia (New South Wales)
- Maxanapis mossman Platnick & Forster, 1989 – Australia (Queensland)
- Maxanapis tenterfield Platnick & Forster, 1989 – Australia (Queensland, New South Wales)
- Maxanapis tribulation Platnick & Forster, 1989 – Australia (Queensland)
