= Gaiziapis =

Scientific classification
- Kingdom: Animalia
- Phylum: Arthropoda
- Subphylum: Chelicerata
- Class: Arachnida
- Order: Araneae
- Infraorder: Araneomorphae
- Family: Anapidae
- Genus: Gaiziapis; Miller, Griswold & Yin, 2009

Type species
- G. zhizhuba Miller, Griswold & Yin, 2009

Species
- G. encunensis Lin & Li, 2012 – China; G. zhizhuba Miller, Griswold & Yin, 2009 – China

Genus of spiders

Gaiziapis is a genus of East Asian araneomorph spiders in the family Anapidae, first described by J. A. Miller, C. E. Griswold & C. M. Yin in 2009. As of October 2026 it contains only two species, both found in China.
