= Guiniella =

Scientific classification
- Kingdom: Animalia
- Phylum: Arthropoda
- Subphylum: Chelicerata
- Class: Arachnida
- Order: Araneae
- Infraorder: Araneomorphae
- Family: Anapidae
- Genus: Guiniella
- Species: G. tropica

Binomial name
- Guiniella tropica (Forster, 1959)

Genus of spiders

Guiniella is a genus of spiders in the family Anapidae. It was first described in 2010 by Rix & Harvey. As of 2026, it contains only one species, Guiniella tropica, found in New Guinea.
