= Sofanapis =

Scientific classification
- Kingdom: Animalia
- Phylum: Arthropoda
- Subphylum: Chelicerata
- Class: Arachnida
- Order: Araneae
- Infraorder: Araneomorphae
- Family: Anapidae
- Genus: Sofanapis
- Species: S. antillanca

Binomial name
- Sofanapis antillanca Platnick & Forster, 1989

Genus of spiders

Sofanapis is a genus of South American araneomorph spiders in the family Anapidae, containing the single species, Sofanapis antillanca. It was first described by Norman I. Platnick & Raymond Robert Forster in 1989, and has only been found in Chile.
