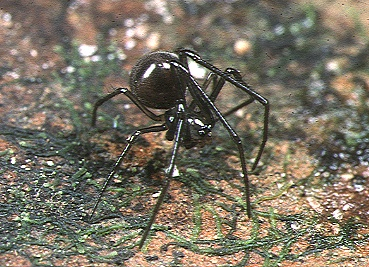
- Conoculus lyugadinus, male

Scientific classification
- Kingdom: Animalia
- Phylum: Arthropoda
- Subphylum: Chelicerata
- Class: Arachnida
- Order: Araneae
- Infraorder: Araneomorphae
- Family: Anapidae
- Genus: Conculus; Kishida, 1940

= Conculus =

Genus of spiders

Conculus is a genus of araneomorph spiders in the family Anapidae, first described by T. Komatsu in 1940. On 30 May 2019, two new species were described, with both coming from Southeast Asia.

== Species ==
As of October 2026, the World Spider Catalog accepted the following species:

- Conculus grossus (Forster, 1959) – New Guinea
- Conculus lyugadinus (Kishida, 1940) – China, Korea, Japan
- Conculus sagadaensis (Zhang & Lin, sp. n.) - Philippines
- Conculus simboggulensis (Paik, 1971) – Korea
- Conculus yaoi (Zhang & Lin, sp. n.) - Indonesia
