= Gigiella =

Scientific classification
- Kingdom: Animalia
- Phylum: Arthropoda
- Subphylum: Chelicerata
- Class: Arachnida
- Order: Araneae
- Infraorder: Araneomorphae
- Family: Anapidae
- Genus: Gigiella; Harvey

Species
- Gigiella milledgei Rix & Harvey, 2010 - Victoria, Tasmania; Gigiella platnicki Rix & Harvey, 2010 - Chile

Genus of spiders

Gigiella is a genus of spiders in the family Anapidae. It was first described in 2010 by Rix & Harvey. As of 2026, it contains 2 species.
