= Victanapis =

Scientific classification
- Kingdom: Animalia
- Phylum: Arthropoda
- Subphylum: Chelicerata
- Class: Arachnida
- Order: Araneae
- Infraorder: Araneomorphae
- Family: Anapidae
- Genus: Victanapis
- Species: V. warburton

Binomial name
- Victanapis warburton Platnick & Forster, 1989

Genus of spiders

Victanapis is a genus of Australian araneomorph spiders in the family Anapidae, containing the single species, Victanapis warburton. It was first described by Norman I. Platnick & Raymond Robert Forster in 1989, and has only been found in Victoria, Australia.
