= Borneanapis =

Scientific classification
- Domain: Eukaryota
- Kingdom: Animalia
- Phylum: Arthropoda
- Subphylum: Chelicerata
- Class: Arachnida
- Order: Araneae
- Infraorder: Araneomorphae
- Family: Anapidae
- Genus: Borneanapis
- Species: B. belalong

Binomial name
- Borneanapis belalong Snazell, 2009

Genus of spiders

Borneanapis is a genus of Indonesian araneomorph spiders in the family Anapidae, containing the single species, Borneanapis belalong. It was first described by R. Snazell in 2009, and has only been found in Indonesia.
