= Montanapis =

Scientific classification
- Kingdom: Animalia
- Phylum: Arthropoda
- Subphylum: Chelicerata
- Class: Arachnida
- Order: Araneae
- Infraorder: Araneomorphae
- Family: Anapidae
- Genus: Montanapis
- Species: M. koghis

Binomial name
- Montanapis koghis Platnick & Forster, 1989

Genus of spiders

Montanapis is a genus of South Pacific araneomorph spiders in the family Anapidae, containing the single species, Montanapis koghis. It was first described by Norman I. Platnick & Raymond Robert Forster in 1989, and has only been found on New Caledonia.
