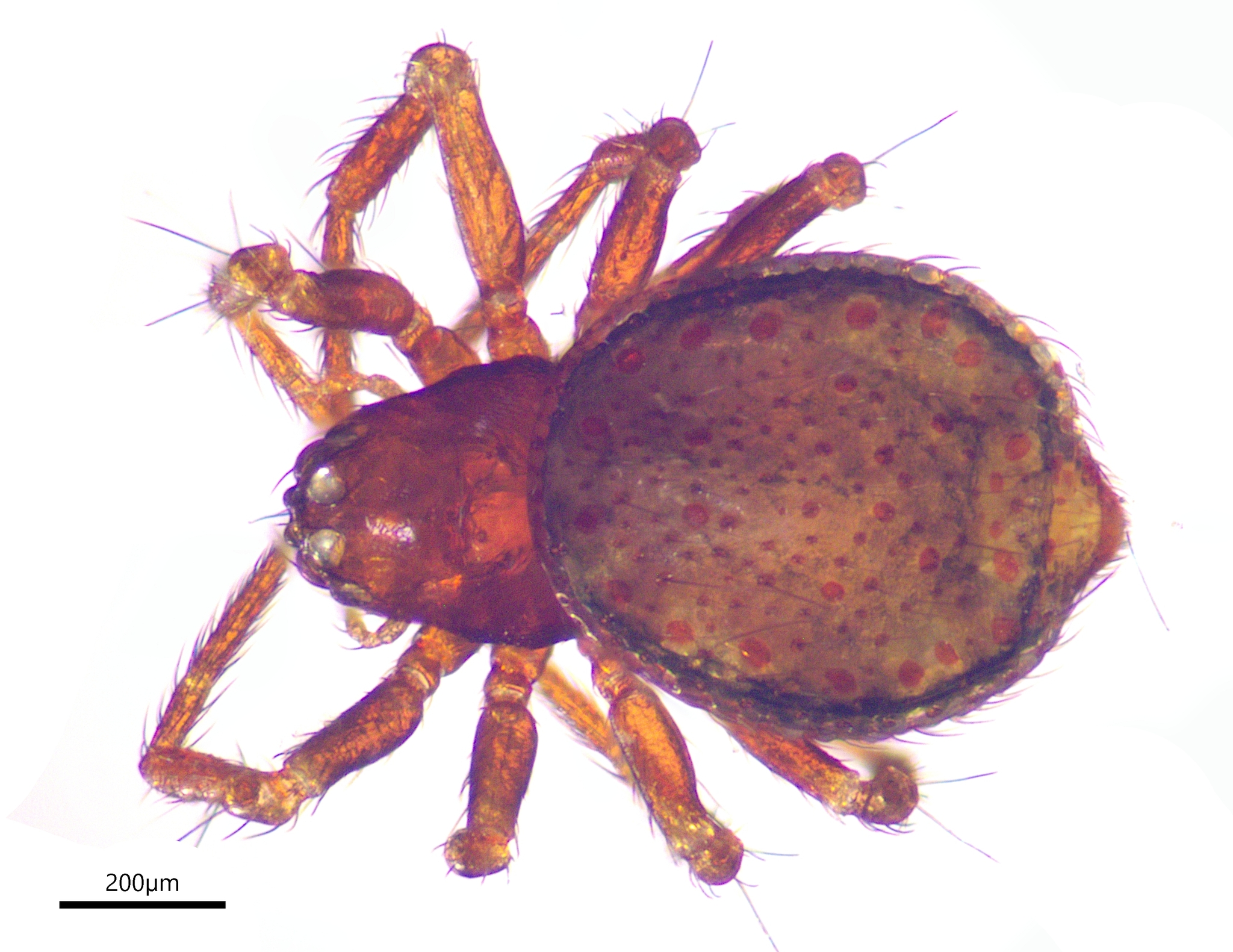

Scientific classification
- Kingdom: Animalia
- Phylum: Arthropoda
- Subphylum: Chelicerata
- Class: Arachnida
- Order: Araneae
- Infraorder: Araneomorphae
- Family: Anapidae
- Genus: Queenslanapis
- Species: Q. lamington

Binomial name
- Queenslanapis lamington Platnick & Forster, 1989

= Queenslanapis =

Queenslanapis lamington

Genus of spiders

Queenslanapis is a genus of Australian araneomorph spiders in the family Anapidae, containing the single species, Queenslanapis lamington. It was first described by Norman I. Platnick & Raymond Robert Forster in 1989, and has only been found in Australia.
