= Nortanapis =

Scientific classification
- Kingdom: Animalia
- Phylum: Arthropoda
- Subphylum: Chelicerata
- Class: Arachnida
- Order: Araneae
- Infraorder: Araneomorphae
- Family: Anapidae
- Genus: Nortanapis
- Species: N. lamond

Binomial name
- Nortanapis lamond Platnick & Forster, 1989

Genus of spiders

Nortanapis is a genus of Australian araneomorph spiders in the family Anapidae, containing the single species, Nortanapis lamond. It was first described by Norman I. Platnick & Raymond Robert Forster in 1989, and has only been found in Queensland, Australia.
