= Forsteriola =

Scientific classification
- Kingdom: Animalia
- Phylum: Arthropoda
- Subphylum: Chelicerata
- Class: Arachnida
- Order: Araneae
- Infraorder: Araneomorphae
- Family: Anapidae
- Genus: Forsteriola; Brignoli, 1981

Type species
- F. proloba (Forster, 1974)

Species
- F. proloba (Forster, 1974) – Burundi, Rwanda; F. rugosa (Forster, 1974) – Congo

Genus of spiders

Forsteriola is a genus of African araneomorph spiders in the family Anapidae, first described by Paolo Brignoli in 1981. As of October 2026 it contains only two species.
