= Anapisona =

Scientific classification
- Kingdom: Animalia
- Phylum: Arthropoda
- Subphylum: Chelicerata
- Class: Arachnida
- Order: Araneae
- Infraorder: Araneomorphae
- Family: Anapidae
- Genus: Anapisona; Gertsch, 1941

Type species
- A. simoni Gertsch, 1941

Species
- 13, see text

Genus of spiders

Anapisona is a genus of araneomorph spiders in the family Anapidae, first described by Willis J. Gertsch in 1941.

== Species ==
As of October 2026 it contains thirteen species, found from Mexico to Brazil:

- Anapisona aragua Platnick & Shadab, 1979 – Colombia, Venezuela
- Anapisona ashmolei Platnick & Shadab, 1979 – Ecuador
- Anapisona bolivari Georgescu, 1987 – Venezuela
- Anapisona bordeaux Platnick & Shadab, 1979 – Virgin Is., Brazil
- Anapisona furtiva Gertsch, 1941 – Panama
- Anapisona guerrai Müller, 1987 – Colombia
- Anapisona hamigera (Simon, 1898) – Panama, Colombia, Venezuela, St. Vincent
- Anapisona kartabo Forster, 1958 – Guyana
- Anapisona kethleyi Platnick & Shadab, 1979 – Mexico, Costa Rica
- Anapisona pecki Platnick & Shadab, 1979 – Ecuador
- Anapisona platnicki Brignoli, 1981 – Brazil
- Anapisona schuhi Platnick & Shadab, 1979 – Brazil
- Anapisona simoni Gertsch, 1941 – Panama
