= Minanapis =

Scientific classification
- Kingdom: Animalia
- Phylum: Arthropoda
- Subphylum: Chelicerata
- Class: Arachnida
- Order: Araneae
- Infraorder: Araneomorphae
- Family: Anapidae
- Genus: Minanapis; Platnick & Forster, 1989

Type species
- M. talinay Platnick & Forster, 1989

Species
- 5, see text

Genus of spiders

Minanapis is a genus of araneomorph spiders in the family Anapidae, first described by Norman I. Platnick & Raymond Robert Forster in 1989.

== Species ==
As of October 2026 it contains five species:

- Minanapis casablanca Platnick & Forster, 1989 – Chile
- Minanapis floris Platnick & Forster, 1989 – Chile
- Minanapis menglunensis Lin & Li, 2012 – China
- Minanapis palena Platnick & Forster, 1989 – Chile, Argentina
- Minanapis talinay Platnick & Forster, 1989 – Chile
