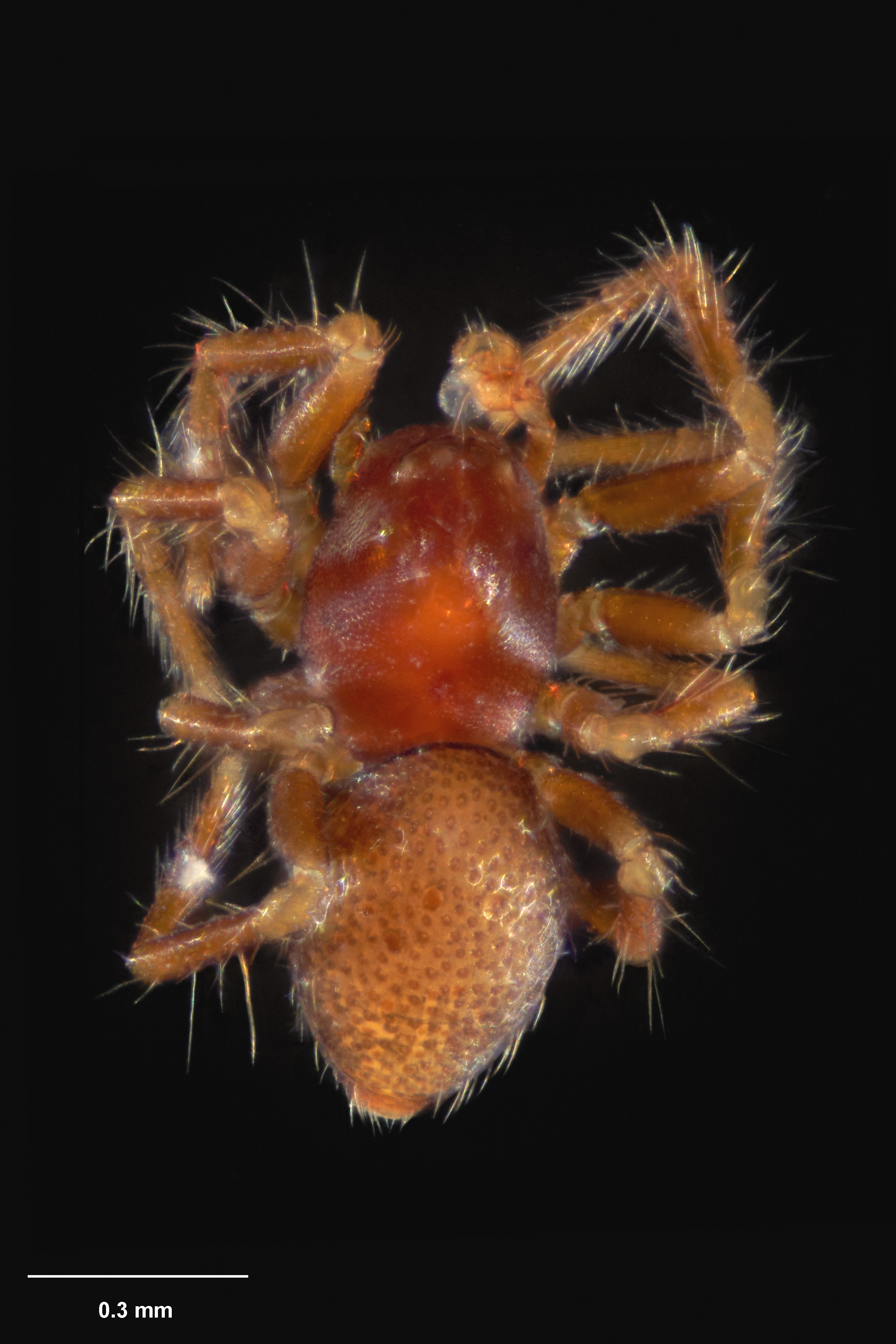

Conservation status
- Data Deficit (NZ TCS)

Scientific classification
- Kingdom: Animalia
- Phylum: Arthropoda
- Subphylum: Chelicerata
- Class: Arachnida
- Order: Araneae
- Infraorder: Araneomorphae
- Family: Anapidae
- Genus: Algidiella; Rix & Harvey, 2010
- Species: A. aucklandica

Binomial name
- Algidiella aucklandica (Forster, 1955)

Synonyms
- Textricella aucklandica

= Algidiella =

Genus of spiders

Algidiella is a monotypic genus of spiders in the family Anapidae. It was first described by Rix and Harvey in 2010. As of 2026, it contains only one species, Algidiella aucklandica.

== Taxonomy ==
This species was described as Textricella aucklandica in 1955 by Ray Forster from male specimens collected on Auckland Island. The genus was described in 2010. The holotype is stored in Te Papa Museum under registration number AS.000008.

== Description ==
The male is recorded at 1.577 mm (0.0621 in) in length. The carapace and legs are dark reddish brown in colour.

== Distribution ==
This species is only known from the Auckland Islands in New Zealand.

== Conservation status ==
Under the New Zealand Threat Classification System, this species is listed as "Data Deficient" with the qualifiers of "Data Poor: Size", "Data Poor: Trend" and "One Location".
