= Risdonius =

Scientific classification
- Kingdom: Animalia
- Phylum: Arthropoda
- Subphylum: Chelicerata
- Class: Arachnida
- Order: Araneae
- Infraorder: Araneomorphae
- Family: Anapidae
- Genus: Risdonius; Hickman, 1939

Type species
- R. parvus Hickman, 1939

Species
- R. barrington Platnick & Forster, 1989 – Australia (New South Wales); R. lind Platnick & Forster, 1989 – Australia (Victoria); R. parvus Hickman, 1939 – Australia (New South Wales to Tasmania)

Genus of spiders

Risdonius is a genus of Australian araneomorph spiders in the family Anapidae, first described by V. V. Hickman in 1939.As of October 2026 it contains only three species.
