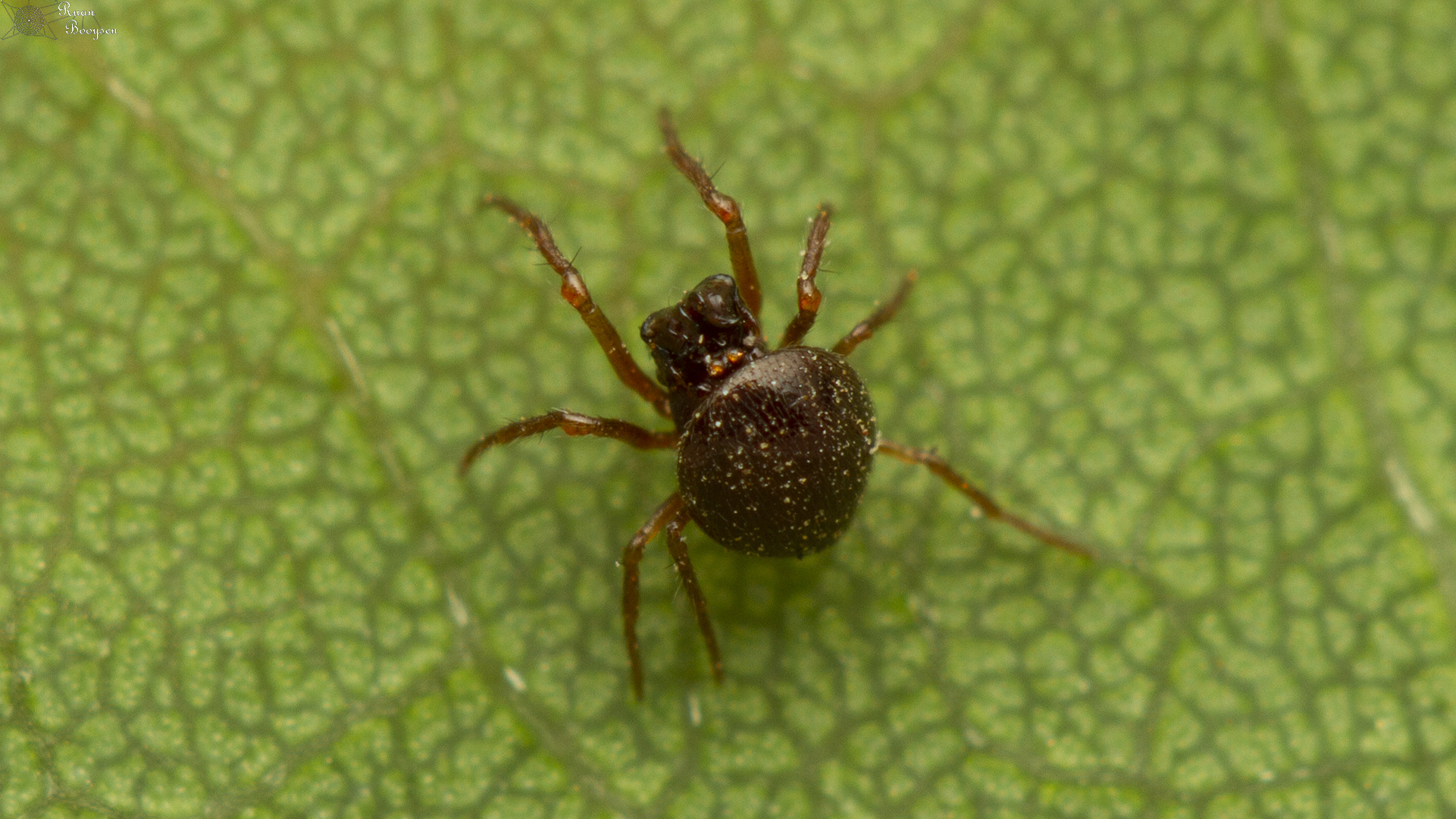
- female
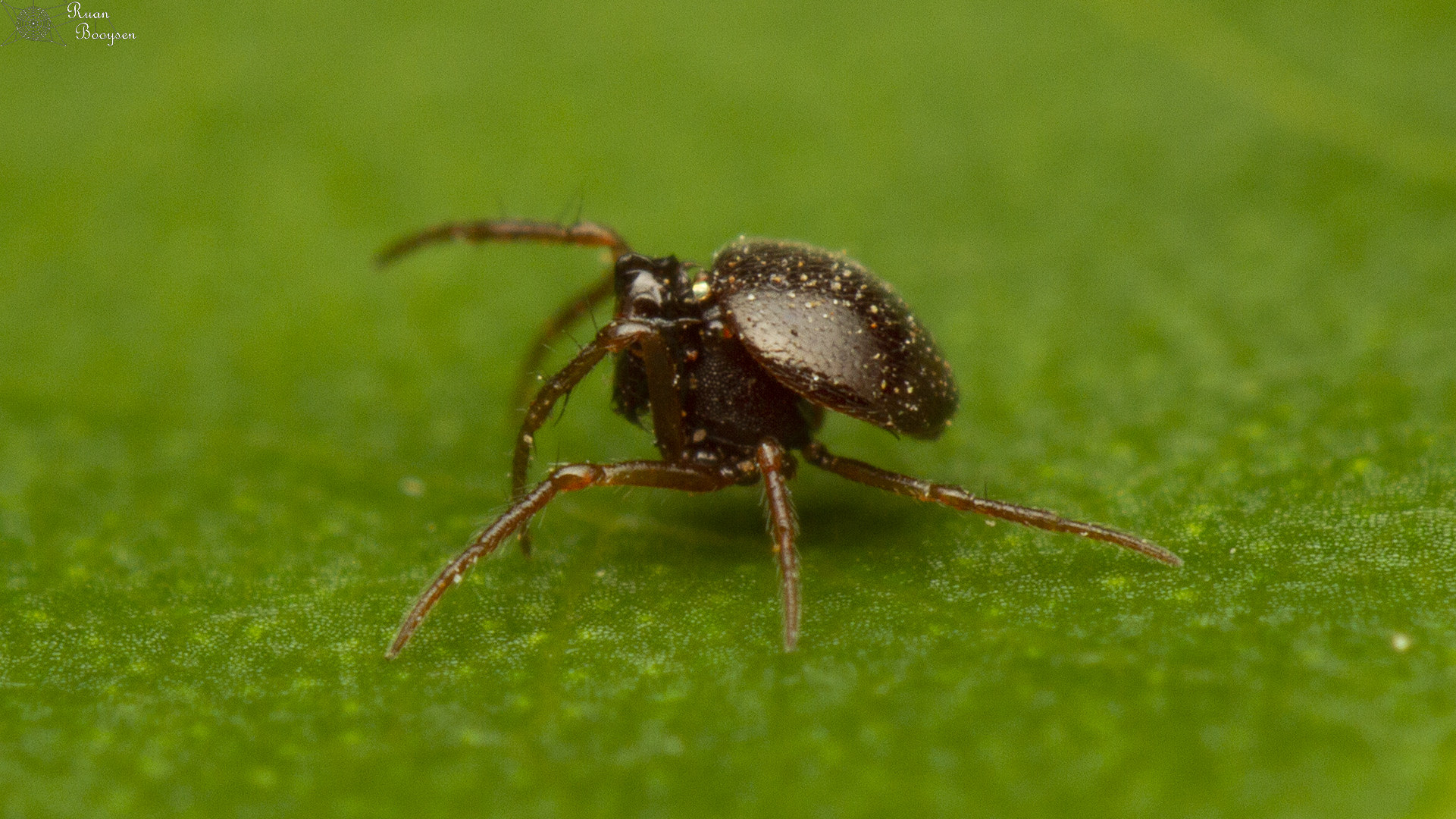
- female, side view

Scientific classification
- Kingdom: Animalia
- Phylum: Arthropoda
- Subphylum: Chelicerata
- Class: Arachnida
- Order: Araneae
- Infraorder: Araneomorphae
- Family: Anapidae
- Genus: Dippenaaria
- Species: D. luxurians

Binomial name
- Dippenaaria luxurians Wunderlich, 1995

= Dippenaaria =

Dippenaar's anapid orb-web spider

Species of spider

Dippenaaria luxurians is a species of spider of the genus Dippenaaria. It is endemic to South Africa and is the type species of this monotypic genus.

== Etymology ==
The genus name Dippenaaria is named in honour of South African arachnologist Ansie Dippenaar-Schoeman, who provided the specimens. The species epithet luxurians comes from Latin, meaning "luxuriant" or "abundant".

== Distribution ==
Dippenaaria luxurians is known only from its holotype, collected in Grahamstown (now Makhanda) in the Eastern Cape province of South Africa. The species is considered a narrow endemic with an estimated extent of occurrence and area of occupancy of only 4 km².

== Habitat ==
The holotype specimen was collected from a Robinia tree in the Albany Thicket biome. The collection site is located at an elevation of 646 metres above sea level in an area that has been significantly transformed by human settlement.

== Description ==
Dippenaaria luxurians is a very small spider, with males measuring less than 3 mm in total length. The cephalothorax and opisthosoma are dark reddish-brown, while the legs are yellowish-brown.

The cephalothorax is notably very high in profile, and there is no visible fovea. The spider has eight eyes arranged in two rows, with the anterior median eyes being the smallest; the posterior eye row is recurved. The clypeus is prominent.

The sternum is approximately as wide as it is long, and extends between the fourth coxae by more than twice their diameter. The legs are short and robust. The tibia has distinctive spine arrangements, with tibia I bearing a retrodistal spine and a long hair-shaped bristle prodistally, and metatarsi I-II having thin spines.

The male possesses a large dorsal scutum on the opisthosoma that almost completely covers it both dorsally and ventrally. The pedipalps are distinctive, with the femur unmodified and the patella having a long ventral apophysis. The tibia has an outstanding dorsal apophysis and a long outgrowth retrofrontally. The cymbium bears a long thorn retrobasally, and the embolus is very long and twisting, with a wide seam ending distally-ventrally.

Only males are described; females have been found, but not yet described.

== Conservation status ==
Dippenaaria luxurians is classified as Data Deficient for taxonomic purposes due to being known only from the holotype male specimen. The species faces potential threats from habitat loss due to infrastructure development around the Grahamstown area. Additional targeted sampling in appropriate microhabitats is needed to locate female specimens and better determine the species' range and conservation status.

== Taxonomy ==
Dippenaaria luxurians is the sole species in the monotypic genus Dippenaaria, making it both the type species and only known representative of its genus. The genus belongs to the family Anapidae, subfamily Anapinae.
