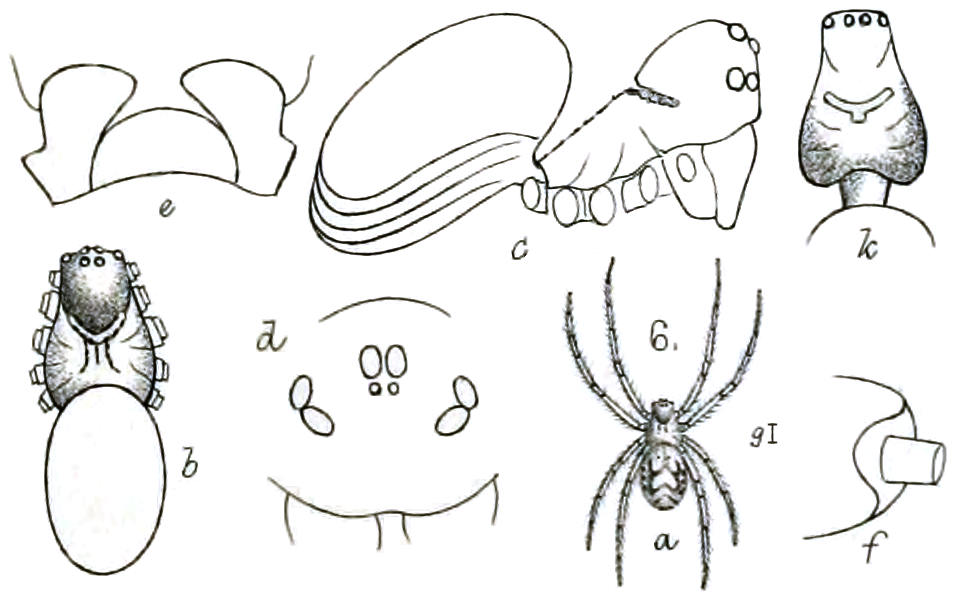
- Male Chasmocephalon neglectum

Scientific classification
- Domain: Eukaryota
- Kingdom: Animalia
- Phylum: Arthropoda
- Subphylum: Chelicerata
- Class: Arachnida
- Order: Araneae
- Infraorder: Araneomorphae
- Family: Anapidae
- Genus: Chasmocephalon; O. Pickard-Cambridge, 1889

Type species
- C. neglectum O. Pickard-Cambridge, 1889

Species
- 8, see text

= Chasmocephalon =

Genus of spiders

Chasmocephalon is a genus of Australian araneomorph spiders in the family Anapidae, first described by O. Pickard-Cambridge in 1889.

== Species ==
As of April 2019 it contains eight species:

- Chasmocephalon acheron Platnick & Forster, 1989 – Australia (Victoria)
- Chasmocephalon alfred Platnick & Forster, 1989 – Australia (Victoria)
- Chasmocephalon eungella Platnick & Forster, 1989 – Australia (Queensland)
- Chasmocephalon flinders Platnick & Forster, 1989 – Australia (Western Australia)
- Chasmocephalon iluka Platnick & Forster, 1989 – Eastern Australia
- Chasmocephalon neglectum O. Pickard-Cambridge, 1889 – Australia (Western Australia)
- Chasmocephalon pemberton Platnick & Forster, 1989 – Australia (Western Australia)
- Chasmocephalon tingle Platnick & Forster, 1989 – Australia (Western Australia)
