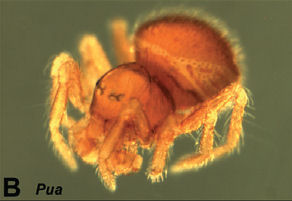

Conservation status
- Not Threatened (NZ TCS)

Scientific classification
- Kingdom: Animalia
- Phylum: Arthropoda
- Subphylum: Chelicerata
- Class: Arachnida
- Order: Araneae
- Infraorder: Araneomorphae
- Family: Anapidae
- Genus: Pua; Forster, 1959
- Species: P. novaezealandiae

Binomial name
- Pua novaezealandiae Forster, 1959

= Pua novaezealandiae =

Species of spider

Pua novaezealandiae is a species of spiders in the family Anapidae. It is the only species in the genus Pua. It is found only in New Zealand.

== Taxonomy ==
This species was described in 1959 by Ray Forster from male and female specimens. The holotype is stored in Canterbury Museum.

== Description ==
The male is recorded at 0.82mm in length whereas the female is 0.90mm.

== Distribution ==
This species is known from the North Island and South Island of New Zealand.

== Conservation status ==
Under the New Zealand Threat Classification System, this species is listed as "Not Threatened".
