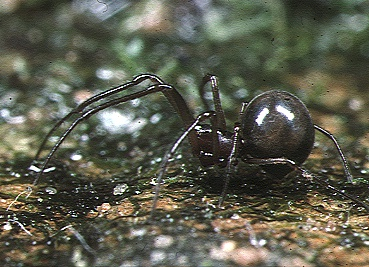
- C. lyugadinus, female from Okinawa
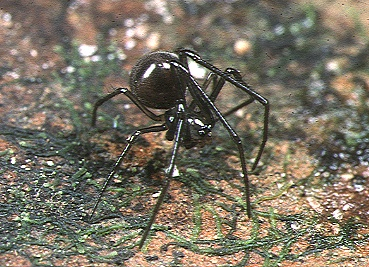
- C. lyugadinus, male

Scientific classification
- Kingdom: Animalia
- Phylum: Arthropoda
- Subphylum: Chelicerata
- Class: Arachnida
- Order: Araneae
- Infraorder: Araneomorphae
- Family: Anapidae; Simon, 1895

Diversity
- 59 genera, 233 species
- blue: reported countries (WSC)

Synonyms
- Micropholcommatidae; Holarchaeidae

= Anapidae =

Anapidae Temporal range: Palaeogene–present

Family of spiders

Anapidae is a family of rather small spiders with 233 described extant species in 59 genera. It includes the former family Micropholcommatidae as the subfamily Micropholcommatinae, and the former family Holarchaeidae. Most species are less than 2 millimetres (0.079 in) long.

They generally live in leaf litter and moss on the floor of rain forest. Many build orb webs with a diameter less than 3 centimetres (1.2 in). In some species, such as Pseudanapis parocula, the pedipalps of the female are reduced to coxal stumps.

== Description ==
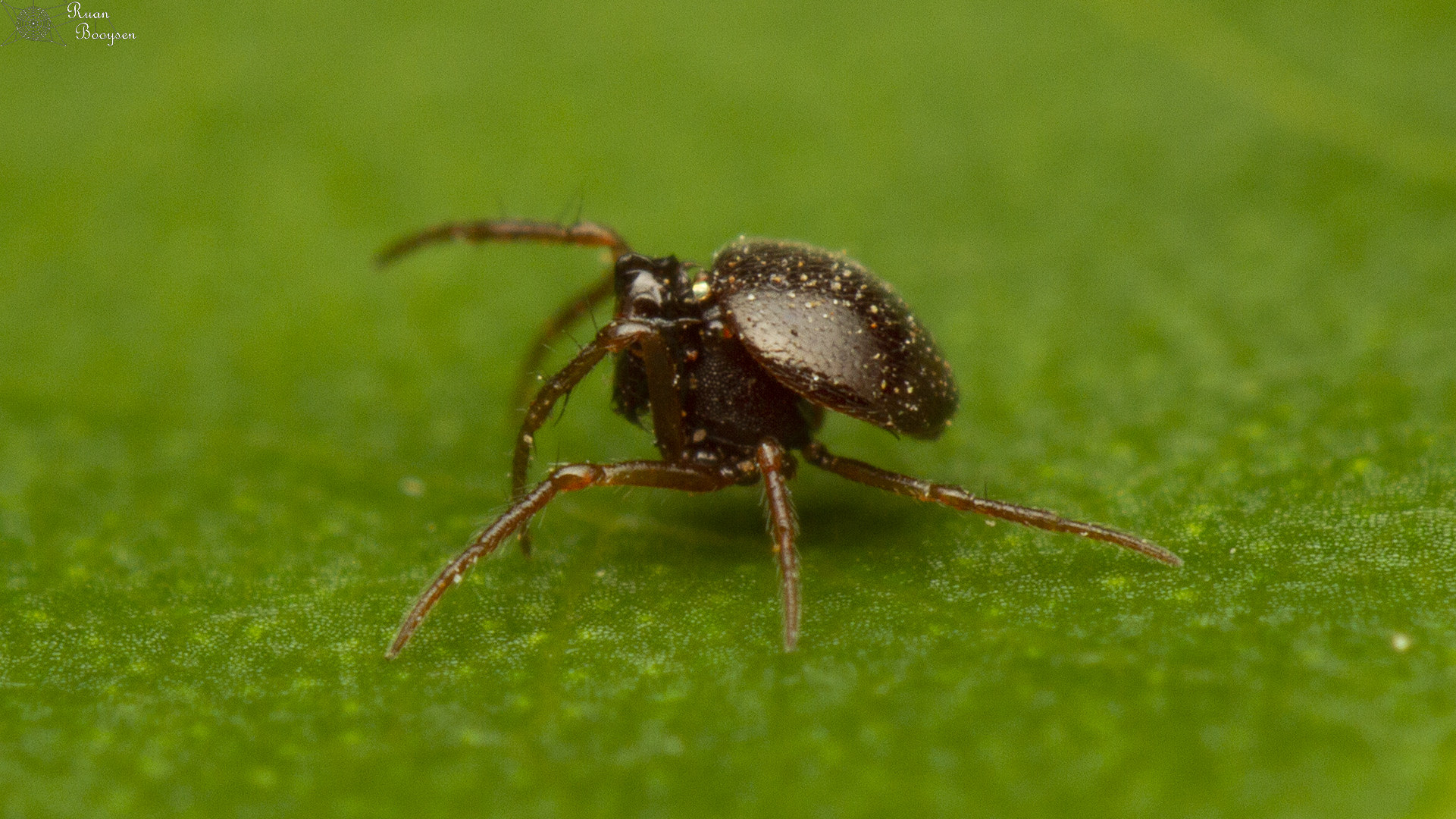
Dippenaaria luxurians

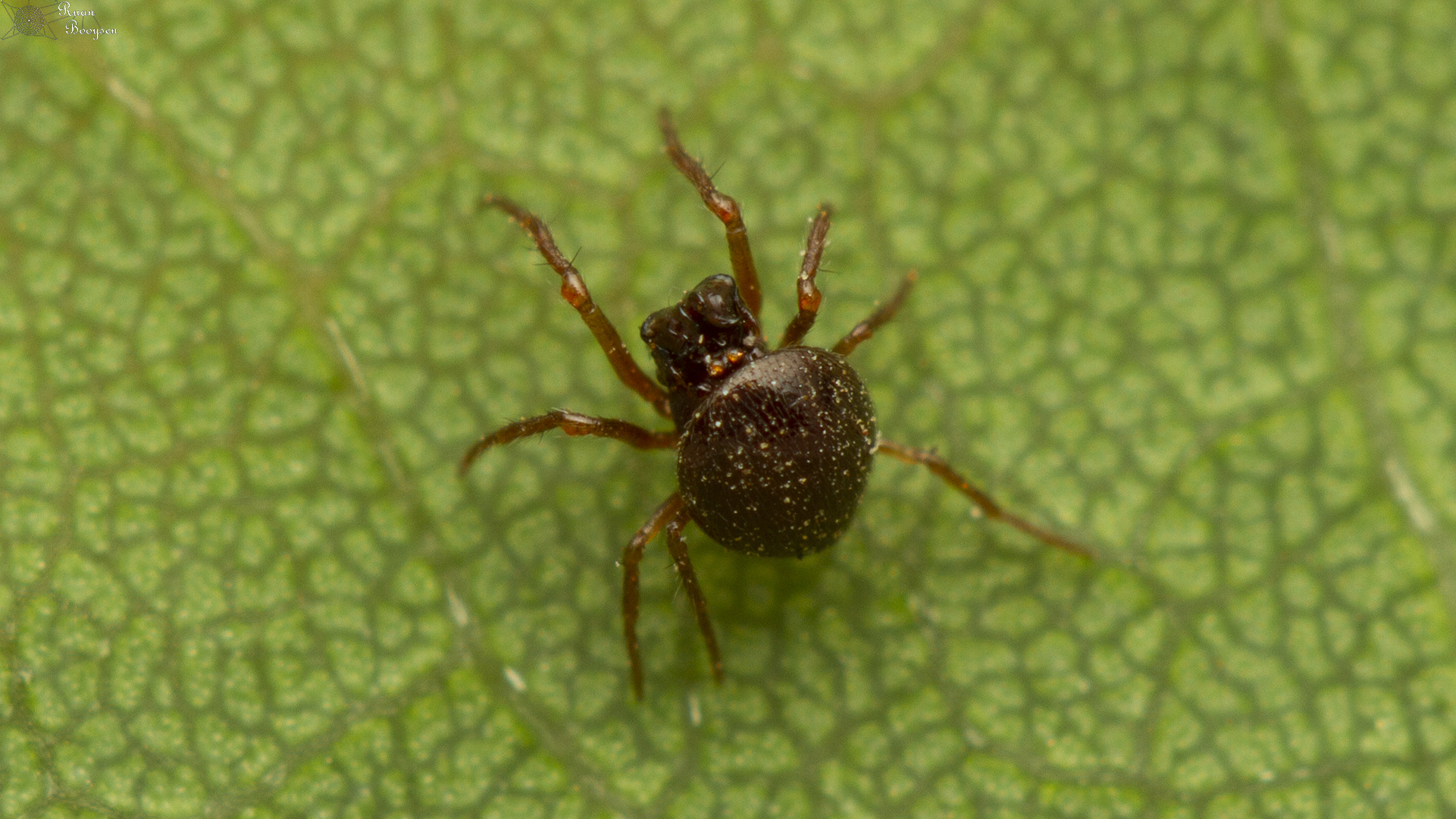
D. luxurians

Spiders of this family are very small, usually less than two millimeters long, and lack a cribellum. They can have zero, six or eight eyes, the rear median eyes either reduced or missing. One species: 'Epigastrina typhlops' (Rix & Harvey, 2010) has no eyes, an adaption to life underground. In some genera the carapace is modified so that the eyes are raised higher than usual. Color can range from reddish brown, yellowish brown to pale, pigment reduced, creams. Generally both margins of chelicerae have teeth, one exception being 'Acrobleps hygrophilus' who lacks retromarginal teeth. The legs are short and spineless, though there are some with reduced spination such as the genus: 'Teutoniella' or with only one or two long spines such as 'Borneanapis'). The labium has a spur that extends between the chelicerae and can be seen when the chelicerae are spread.

== Distribution ==
Anapidae are found worldwide, particularly in South America, Africa, Asia, Australia and New Zealand. Few genera occur in North America or Europe. Only Comaroma simoni and the three species of Zangherella are found in Europe; Gertschanapis shantzi and Comaroma mendocino are found in the United States.

== Systematics ==
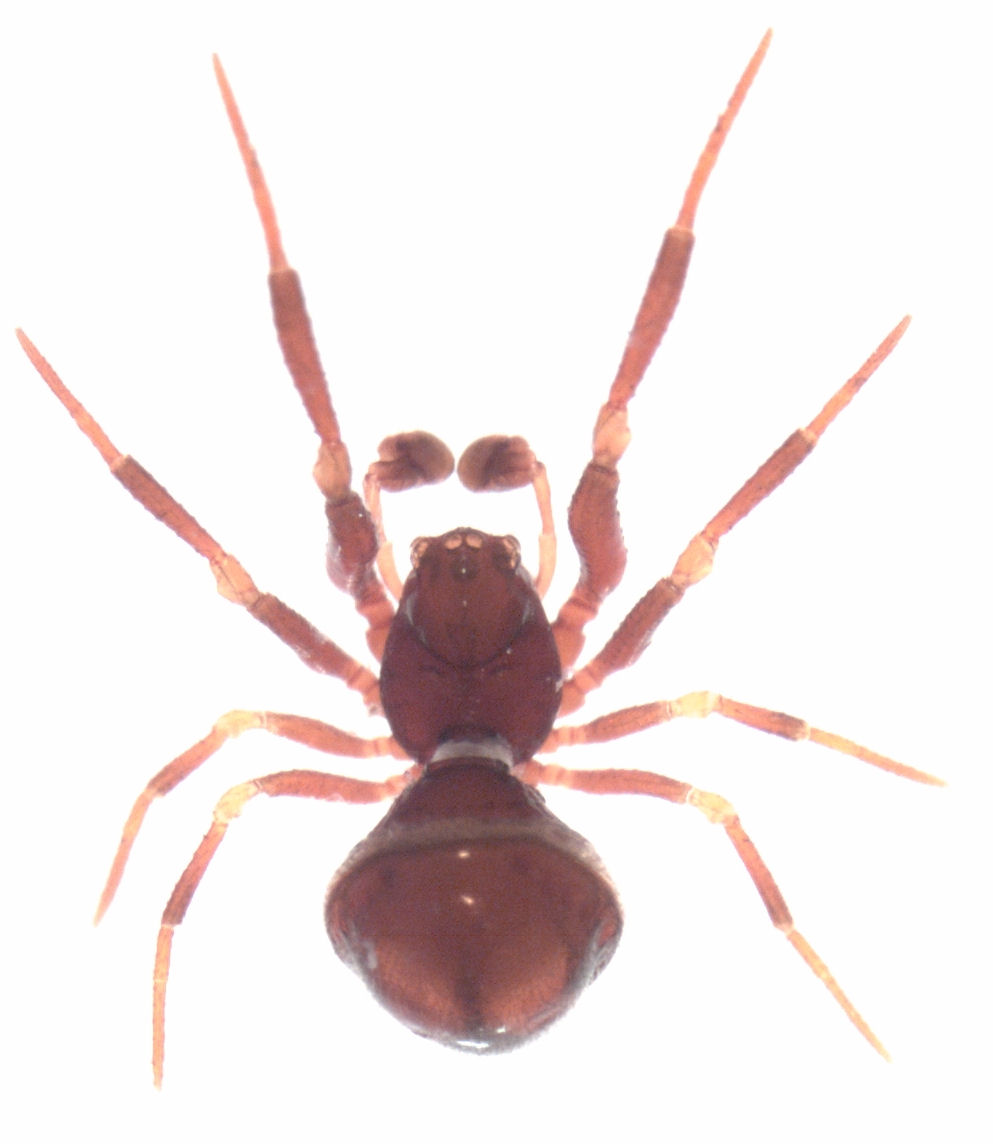
male Novanapis spinipes

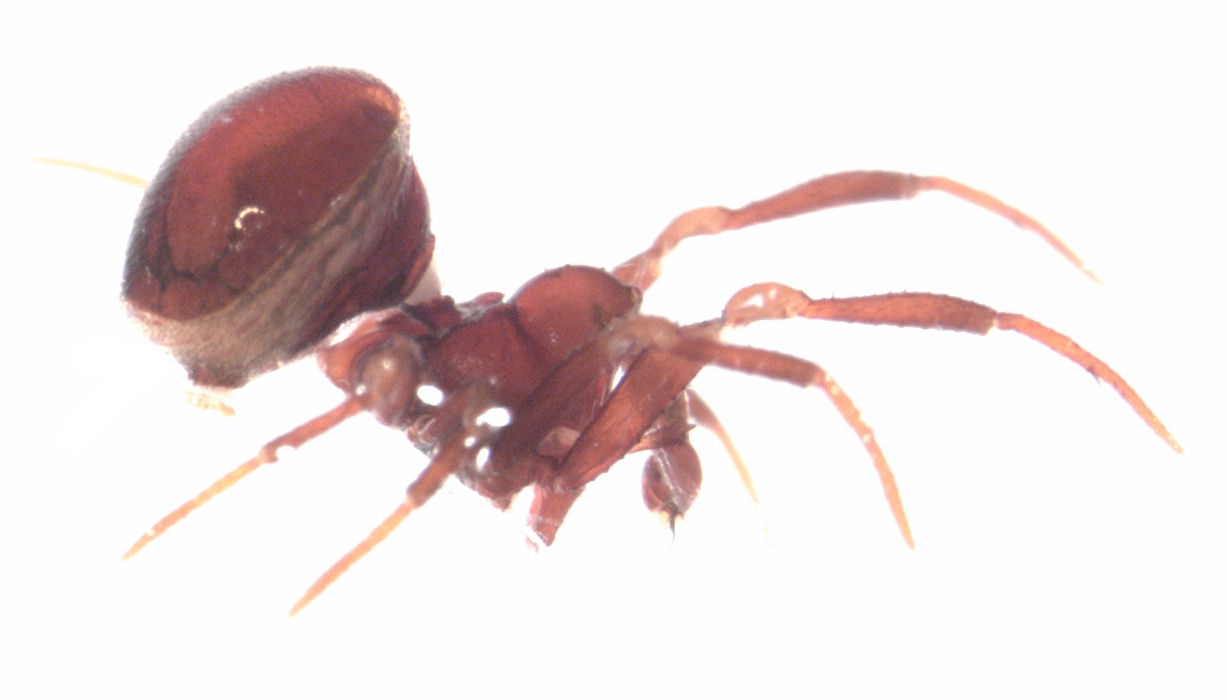
male N. spinipes

The family Micropholcommatidae was synonymized with this family by Schütt in 2003 and by Lopa et al. in 2011, a change that has been accepted by the World Spider Catalog. Similarly, the family Holarchaeidae was synonymized by Dimitrov et al. in 2017, and likewise accepted by the World Spider Catalog.

== Genera ==
As of October 2026, this family includes 59 genera and 233 species:

- Acrobleps Hickman, 1979 – Tasmania
- Algidiella Rix & Harvey, 2010 – New Zealand (Auckland Islands)
- Anapis Simon, 1895 – Central America, South America
- Anapisona Gertsch, 1941 – Central America, South America
- Austropholcomma Rix & Harvey, 2010 – Western Australia, Tasmania
- Borneanapis Snazell, 2009 – Borneo
- Caledanapis Platnick & Forster, 1989 – New Caledonia
- Chasmocephalon O. Pickard-Cambridge, 1889 – Australia
- Comaroma Bertkau, 1889 – China, Europe, Japan, Korea, United States
- Conculus Kishida, 1940 – Asia
- Crassanapis Platnick & Forster, 1989 – Argentina, Chile
- Crozetulus Hickman, 1939 – Crozet Islands, Southern Africa
- Dippenaaria Wunderlich, 1995 – South Africa
- Elanapis Platnick & Forster, 1989 – Chile
- Enielkenie Ono, 2007 – Taiwan
- Eperiella Rix & Harvey, 2010 – Tasmania, Chile
- Epigastrina Rix & Harvey, 2010 – Tasmania
- Eterosonycha Butler, 1932 – Australia
- Forsteriola Brignoli, 1981 – Central Africa
- Gaiziapis Miller, Griswold & Yin, 2009 – China
- Gertschanapis Platnick & Forster, 1990 – United States
- Gigiella Rix & Harvey, 2010 – Australia, Chile
- Guiniella Rix & Harvey, 2010 – New Guinea
- Hickmanapis Platnick & Forster, 1989 – Tasmania
- Holarchaea Forster, 1955 – Tasmania, New Zealand
- Mandanapis Platnick & Forster, 1989 – New Caledonia
- Maxanapis Platnick & Forster, 1989 – Australia
- Metanapis Brignoli, 1981 – Kenya, South Africa, Congo, Nepal
- Micropholcomma Crosby & Bishop, 1927 – Australia
- Minanapis Platnick & Forster, 1989 – Argentina, Chile, China
- Montanapis Platnick & Forster, 1989 – New Caledonia
- Normplatnicka Rix & Harvey, 2010 – Australia, Chile
- Nortanapis Platnick & Forster, 1989 – Australia (Queensland)
- Novanapis Platnick & Forster, 1989 – New Zealand
- Octanapis Platnick & Forster, 1989 – Australia
- Olgania Hickman, 1979 – Australia (Tasmania)
- Paranapis Platnick & Forster, 1989 – New Zealand
- Patelliella Rix & Harvey, 2010 – Lord Howe Island
- Pecanapis Platnick & Forster, 1989 – Chile
- Plectochetos Butler, 1932 – Australia
- Pseudanapis Simon, 1905 – Asia, Oceania, Central America, South America. Introduced to Europe, Mauritius, Réunion
- Pua Forster, 1959 – New Zealand
- Queenslanapis Platnick & Forster, 1989 – Australia (Queensland)
- Raveniella Rix & Harvey, 2010 – Australia
- Rayforstia Rix & Harvey, 2010 – Australia, New Zealand
- Risdonius Hickman, 1939 – Australia
- Sheranapis Platnick & Forster, 1989 – Chile
- Sinanapis Wunderlich & Song, 1995 – Southeast Asia
- Sofanapis Platnick & Forster, 1989 – Chile
- Spinanapis Platnick & Forster, 1989 – Australia (Queensland)
- Taliniella Rix & Harvey, 2010 – New Zealand
- Taphiassa Simon, 1880 – Australia, New Caledonia, New Zealand, Sri Lanka
- Tasmanapis Platnick & Forster, 1989 – Tasmania
- Teutoniella Brignoli, 1981 – Brazil, Chile
- Tinytrella Rix & Harvey, 2010 – New Zealand
- Tricellina Forster & Platnick, 1989 – Chile
- Victanapis Platnick & Forster, 1989 – Australia (Victoria)
- Zangherella Caporiacco, 1949 – Southern Europe, Tunisia
- Zealanapis Platnick & Forster, 1989 – New Zealand

There are also genera only known as fossils, typically in Baltic amber:

- †Balticoroma Wunderlich, 2004
- †Balticonopsis Wunderlich, 2004
- †Cenotextricella Penney in Penney et al., 2007
- †Deanoorapsis Penney, 2020
- †Dubianapis Wunderlich, 2004
- †Flagellanapis Wunderlich, 2004
- †Fossilanapis Wunderlich, 2004
- †Palaeoanapis Wunderlich, 1988
- †Ruganapis Wunderlich, 2004
- †Saxonanapis Wunderlich, 2004
- †Tuberanapis Wunderlich, 2004
