= Eugène Simon =

French naturalist

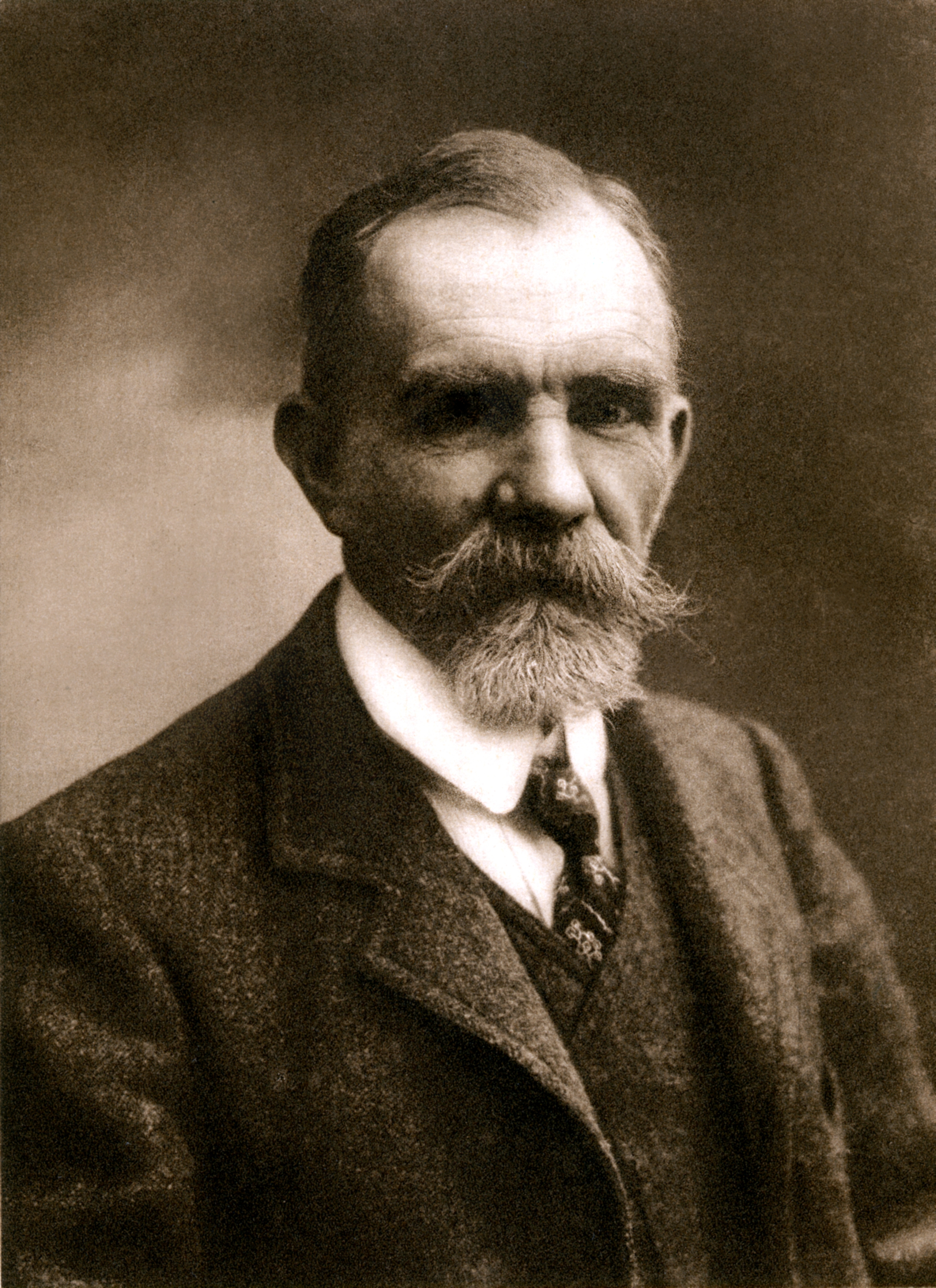
- Portrait c. 1900
- Born: 30 April 1848
- Died: 17 November 1924 (aged 76)
- Scientific career
- Workplaces: Muséum National d'Histoire Naturelle, Paris

Eugène Louis Simon (French pronunciation: [øʒɛn lwi simɔ̃]; 30 April 1848 – 17 November 1924) was a French naturalist who worked particularly on insects and spiders, but also on birds and plants. He is by far the most prolific spider taxonomist in history, describing over 4,000 species.

== Work on spiders ==
His most significant work was Histoire Naturelle des Araignées (1892–1903), an encyclopedic treatment of the spider genera of the world. It was published in two volumes of more than 1000 pages each, and the same number of drawings by Simon. Working at the Muséum National d'Histoire Naturelle in Paris, it took Simon 11 years to complete, while working at the same time on devising a taxonomic scheme that embraced the known taxa. Simon described a total of 4,650 species, and as of 2013 about 3,790 species are still considered valid. The International Society of Arachnology offers a Simon Award recognising lifetime achievement.

The Eocene fossil spider species Cenotextricella simoni was named in his honor.

== Work on birds ==
Simon also had an interest in hummingbirds. Simon made the first collections of birds in the Sierra Nevada de Santa Marta region of Colombia. During his career, described several species and races as well as creating the genera Anopetia, Stephanoxis, Haplophaedia and Taphrolesbia. He is commemorated by race simoni of the swallow-tailed hummingbird (Eupetomena macroura). His seminal work on hummingbirds was Histoire Naturelle des Trochilidae in 1921.

== Work on plants ==
The standard author abbreviation Simon is used to indicate this person as the author when citing a botanical name. Simon's contributions to botany formed a relatively minor part of his work, and he should not be confounded with the French botanist Eugène Ernest Simon (1871–1967), abbreviation E.Simon.
