= Cook Bicentenary Expedition =

Research expedition in the South-West Pacific (1969)

- Country: Cook Islands; Tonga
- Country of origin: New Zealand
- Start: August 1969
- End: October 1969
- Leader: Elliot Watson Dawson
- Organiser: Royal Society of New Zealand
- Vessels: USS Namakagon
- Participants: Roger Duff; Janet Davidson; Keith Wise; Elliot Watson Dawson; William Philipson; David Stoddart; Peter E. Gibbs; Gwynne Vevers; Francis Raymond Fosberg; Michael Trotter

The Cook Bicentenary Expedition 1969 was undertaken from August to October of 1969 to research the archaeology, geology and biodiversity of the Cook Islands and Tonga.

== Origins and planning of the expedition ==
In 1965 New Zealand scientists proposed a scientific expedition in the Pacific as part of the bicentennial commemoration of James Cook's landing in New Zealand in 1769. In 1966 the council of the Royal Society of New Zealand proposed the voyage for 1969, using the vessel HMNZS Endeavour, and invited members of the Royal Society of London to participate in the expedition around the southwest Pacific. In April 1969 Elliot Watson Dawson was named expedition leader and J. V. Eade was named deputy leader.

Because HMNZS Endeavour could only accommodate 14 passengers and could only allow a limited time ashore to meet the short cruise time it was determined that land parties would have to transported by air at some times with civil air transport available in Tonga and the use of RNZAF Hercules aircraft transport obtained for Rarotonga and Aitutaki.

This led to the development of three expedition groups. The first group was the Tongan group with seven people working on four projects, the second was the Cook Island group which involved eight people working on five projects, and finally the Endeavour group, with four people working on five projects on board the ship.

== Participants ==
Expedition Committee

- Edwin Ian Robertson, DSIR
- James William Brodie, New Zealand Oceanographic Institute
- Richard Kenneth Dell, Dominion Museum

HMNZS Endeavour crew

- Commander D. G. Bamfield, Captain

Archaeologists

- Janet Davidson, Auckland Institute and Museum
- Roger Duff, Canterbury Museum
- Michael M. Trotter, Canterbury Museum

Botanist

- William R. Philipson, Botany Department, University of Canterbury

Entomologist

- Keith Arthur John Wise, Auckland Institute and Museum

Geologists

- P. G. Harris, Department of Earth Sciences, University of Leeds, Royal Society of London participant
- P. E. Baker, Department of Earth Sciences, University of Leeds, Royal Society of London participant
- A. Reay, Geology Department, University of Otago

Geophysicists

- J. T Lumb, Geophysics Division, DSIR, Wellington
- L. Carrington, Geophysics Division, DSIR, Wellington

Marine Biologists and Geographers

- Gwynne Vevers, Zoological Society of London, Royal Society of London participant
- David Stoddart, Department of Geography, Cambridge University, Royal Society of London participant
- Peter E. Gibbs, Marine Laboratory, Plymouth, Royal Society of London participant
- Elliot Watson Dawson, Expedition leader, Oceanographic Institute, DSIR, Wellington
- W. de L. Main, Oceanographic Institute, DSIR, Wellington
- J. V. Eade, Deputy leader of the expedition, Oceanographic Institute, DSIR, Wellington
- G. B. Orbell, Soil Bureau, DSIR, Wellington

Atmospheric scientists

- G. F. Preddey, Physics and Engineering Laboratory, DSIR, Wellington
- A. Utanga, Department of Internal Affairs, Rarotonga, Cook Islands
- S. G. Kingan, Department of Internal Affairs, Rarotonga, Cook Islands

Media representatives

- Bruce Morrison, produced, New Zealand Broadcasting Corporation, as part of a team of four.
- Harry D. B. Dansey, Auckland Star, New Zealand Press Association correspondent

== Research focus areas ==
When establishing the aims of the voyage, the Expedition Committee invited participants to propose projects with a scope limited to what could be achieved in the timeframe of the expedition. In 1968 the expedition scientific programme was finalised to the following project areas.

Archaeology

The archaeological work consisted of a preliminary survey of the Vava'u Group in Tonga, and a survey of Atiu, Cook Islands.

Biology

A study of the flora of Rarotonga to see the distribution of genera in the Pacific.

Trapping air-born insects at sea to track insect dispersal, and examining insects and small invertebrates in leaf litter, mosses, and soil in southern parts of the Cook Islands to determine distribution patterns of endemic, introduced, and indigenous species.

A survey of habitats of marine animals, and a study of shallow-water marine areas like coral reefs in Rarotonga and Aitutaki.

Geology

A study of the geology of Tofua, in Tonga, in relation to the theory of plate tectonics.

Geophysics

A magnetic survey of the ocean bottom near Aitutaki, Rarotonga, and Mangaia using tracks beneath the Endeavour.

Oceanography

The oceanography research focus covered four topics. A continuous study of the topography of the ocean floor beneath the ship using echo-sounding, plankton sampling, dredging around Tonga and the Cook Islands for samples of fauna distribution, and water samples for analysis if carbon-14 by the Nuclear Sciences Institute, DSIR.

Soil science

Surveys of soil in Vava'u, Tofua, Kao.

Upper atmosphere physics

Studies into the physics of the equatorial ionosphere. This included looking at total ionosphere electron content. They also studied the nighttime VHF television transmissions from Honolulu.

== Expedition ==
The expedition began in August 1969. The Tongan group flew from Auckland to Nuku'alofa via Fiji arriving by 2 September 1969. The Cook Island group were flown by RNZAF Hercules to Rarotonga, or travelled on the M.S. Arawa. On 27 August this group continued on the Hercules to Aitutaki with the Royal Society of London party.

On 28 August 1969 HMNZS Endeavour left Auckland with Duff, Trotter, Eade, Preddey, Carrington, and Bennett on board, arriving in Aitutaki on 5 September. The ship then left for Rarotonga on 8 September for the main seaborne studies. These studies were completed successfully with minor delays due to a repair required on the echo-sounding system on 13–15 September, with a RNZN dockyard technician coming from Auckland to Nuku'alofa. Rough seas on 24 September meant there was less time for rock sampling and insect collecting in Mangaia. Scientists disembarked from 23 September, with the Endeavour leaving Nuku'alofa for Gisborne on 3 October, arriving on 9 October 1969.
