= Janet Davidson =

New Zealand archaeologist

Janet Davidson ONZM
- Born: 1941 (age 84–85); Lower Hutt, New Zealand
- Occupations: Archaeologist; museum curator

Academic background
- Education: University of Auckland

Academic work
- Discipline: Pacific archaeology
- Institutions: Auckland Institute and Museum; University of Otago; National Museum of New Zealand; Museum of New Zealand Te Papa Tongarewa

Janet Marjorie Davidson ONZM (born 1941) is a New Zealand museum curator and archaeologist who has carried out extensive field work in the Pacific Islands throughout Polynesia, Micronesia and Melanesia. She has been the E. Earle Vaile archaeologist at the Auckland War Memorial Museum and a senior curator at Te Papa Tongarewa.

== Early life ==
Davidson was born in 1941 in Lower Hutt to John and Christine Davidson. Her father taught classics and mathematics at Hutt Valley High School and her brother John became a professor of classics at Victoria University of Wellington. She attended Hutt Valley High School. As a teenager she became interested in a career in museums and archaeology and commenced work at the Dominion Museum as a vacation assistant in 1958. She began studying for a Bachelor of Arts at Victoria University of Wellington but subsequently switched to the University of Auckland, graduating in 1962. Early archaeology work included excavations of middens at Porirua, the site of the Paremata barracks and at Sarah's Gully on the Coromandel.

== Career ==
In 1964, Davidson graduated with a Master of Arts degree in anthropology from the University of Auckland with a thesis that analysed shell middens from a range of archaeological sites. From 1964 to 1966 she was a Bernice P. Bishop Museum Field Associate in Anthropology. In 1966 she was appointed as the E. Earle Vaile archaeologist at the Auckland Institute and Museum (based in the Auckland War Memorial Museum). From 1974 to 1976 she was a Rhodes Visiting Fellow in Oxford; during this period her position at the museum was filled by the British archaeologist Aileen Fox. In 1980 she moved to Dunedin to join her husband, Foss Leach, continuing her association with the Museum as an honorary research associate in archaeology. She was an honorary lecturer at the University of Otago and later held the positions of ethnologist at the National Museum from 1991 to 1996 and Curator of Pacific Collections, at the Museum of New Zealand Te Papa Tongarewa from 1996 to 2002.

Davidson began carrying out fieldwork in the Pacific with Roger Green in the early 1960s while she was still a student. She excavated sites at Moorea in French Polynesia (1961–1962), Upolu in Samoa (1964, 1965–1966), Tongatapu and Vava'u in Tonga (1964) and Nukuoro (1965). The Nukuoro excavation was the first on a coral atoll and Davidson's excavation techniques demonstrated that cultural transformation from pre-human times could be uncovered. Later with Foss Leach she excavated in the Federated States of Micronesia as well as Papua New Guinea and, in particular, the Namu burial ground on Taumako in the Solomon Islands. Davidson and Leach's report on Taumako was published in 2008.

Davidson and Green co-authored a two-volume report Archaeology in Western Samoa and laid the foundation for archaeology in Samoa and the study of settlement patterns in Samoa before 1840; her findings on settlement patterns challenged views current at the time. In 1969 Davidson participated in the Cook Bicentenary Expedition undertaking archaeological research at the Vava'u Group, Tonga.

In New Zealand Davidson did extensive fieldwork in Northland, Auckland and the Coromandel. From 1966 to 1978 she investigated settlement patterns on Motutapu Island. There she and Anne Leahy carried out excavations at Station Bay investigating undefended sites and pā. In 1971–1972 she carried out an archaeological survey of Te Paki in Northland for the Department of Lands and Survey after the land had been purchased by the government in 1966.

Davidson has had a public role giving talks promoting archaeology and educating the public. Throughout her career she has advocated for the preservation of archaeological sites, calling for legislative protection in the early 1970s. In 1972 she became the first woman president of the New Zealand Archaeological Association holding the office for two years. She had previously been the Association's secretary from 1966 to 1972. She also served on the council of the Polynesian Society and the Auckland Civic Trust. An advocate for archaeology in the Historic Places Trust she served on the council from 1968 to 1978; during her tenure the Historic Places Amendment Act 1976 was passed which gave protection to historic places.

While at the Dominion Museum and Te Papa Davidson undertook the reorganisation and rehousing of the collections of Māori artefacts and the curation and storage of the faunal remains collections. On her retirement from Te Papa in 2002 Davidson and Leach (with his research interests in the settlement of Palliser Bay) established a research project called 'Bridge and Barrier? Māori occupation on the shores of Cook Strait, New Zealand'. This involved working with Māori iwi Rangitāne ki Wairau and Ngati Hinewaka on experimental studies growing and storing kūmara (sweet potato) in Ngākuta Bay in the Marlborough Sounds.

Davidson has published widely on the prehistory of New Zealand and the Pacific Islands. She edited the New Zealand Journal of Archaeology from 1985 to 2008. She was also a major contributor to the Journal of the Polynesian Society. She published two major books: The Prehistory of New Zealand in 1984 and The Cook Voyages Encounters: The Cook Voyages Collections of Te Papa in 2019.

== Honours ==
In 1985 Davidson was made a Fellow of the Royal Society Te Apārangi. She received the Elsdon Best Memorial Medal from the Polynesian Society in 1986 for outstanding scholarship in the study of the Māori people. In the same year the University of Otago awarded her a Doctor of Science. The Auckland Institute and Museum made her an Honorary Fellow in 1999. In the 1996 Queen's Birthday Honours, Davidson was appointed an Officer of the New Zealand Order of Merit for services to archaeology.

The festschrift Vastly Ingenious: The Archaeology of Pacific Material Culture – in honour of Janet M. Davidson was published in 2007. It presented essays of new research by leading international scholars with an introduction by Roger Green. Published by Otago University Press, the book was edited by three Pacific prehistorians: Atholl Anderson, Kaye C. Green, and Foss Leach.

In 2014 Davidson received the Roger C. Green Lifetime Achievement Award from the New Zealand Archaeological Association. She was selected as one of the Royal Society Te Apārangi's "150 women in 150 words" in 2017, celebrating the contributions of women to knowledge in New Zealand.

== Selected works ==
- Davidson, Janet Marjorie (1969). "Archaeological Excavations in Two Burial Mounds at 'Atele, Tongatapu". Records of the Auckland Institute and Museum. 6: 251–286. JSTOR 42906129. Wikidata Q58676828.
- Davidson, Janet Marjorie (1970). "Survey of Archaeological Sites on Motutapu Island". Records of the Auckland Institute and Museum. 7: 1–12. JSTOR 42906140. OCLC 153389384. Wikidata Q58676843.
- Davidson, Janet Marjorie (1971). "Archaeology on Nukuoro Atoll: a Polynesian outlier in the eastern Caroline Islands". Bulletin of the Auckland Institute and Museum. 9. ISSN 0067-0456. OCLC 549013. Wikidata Q115027898.
- Searle, Ernest Johnstone; Davidson, Janet Marjorie (1973), A Picture Guide to the Volcanic Cones of Auckland, Showing Geological and Archaeological Features, Auckland: Auckland Institute and Museum, OCLC 992194660, Wikidata Q115923600
- Davidson, Janet Marjorie (1974). "Some Hafted Shell Adzes in the Auckland Museum". Records of the Auckland Institute and Museum. 11: 1–8. JSTOR 42906200. Wikidata Q58676956.
- Green, Roger Curtis; Davidson, Janet Marjorie (1974). "Archaeology in Western Samoa". Bulletin of the Auckland Institute and Museum. 6, 7. ISSN 0067-0456. LCCN 73452949. OCLC 65176. Wikidata Q115027564.
- Davidson, Janet Marjorie (1975). "The Excavation of Skipper's Ridge (N40/7), Opito, Coromandel Peninsula, in 1959 and 1960". Records of the Auckland Institute and Museum. 12: 1–42. JSTOR 42906218. Wikidata Q58676993.
- Davidson, Janet (1975). Te Paki archaeological survey. Auckland: Dept. of Lands and Survey. OCLC 3771851.
- Janet M. Davidson (1977). "Western Polynesia and Fiji: Prehistoric contact, diffusion and differentiation in adjacent archipelagos". World Archaeology. 9 (1): 82–94. doi:10.1080/00438243.1977.9979686. Wikidata Q57205528.
- Davidson, Janet Marjorie; Green, Roger Curtis (1979). "Archaeology in Western Samoa. Index". Archaeology in Western Samoa. OCLC 973590638. Wikidata Q115029229. Archived from the original on 9 June 2024.
- Davidson, Janet (1987). The prehistory of New Zealand. Auckland: Longman Paul. ISBN 0582718120.
- Davidson, Janet Marjorie (1990). "Test Excavations on the Headland Pa at Kauri Point, Birkenhead, Auckland, in 1971". Records of the Auckland Institute and Museum. 27: 1–18. JSTOR 42906400. Wikidata Q58677382.
- Davidson, Janet Marjorie; Wallace, Roderick Thomas (1992). "Additional Information about the Pa at Kauri Point, Birkenhead, Auckland". Records of the Auckland Institute and Museum. 29: 1–5. JSTOR 42906421. Wikidata Q58677420.
- Davidson, Janet Marjorie (1996). "Maori Prehistory". Maori: Art and Culture: 8–25. Wikidata Q130263583.
- Leach, Foss; Davidson, Janet (2008). The archaeology of Taumako : a Polynesian outlier in the Eastern Solomon Islands. Dunedin: New Zealand Journal of Archaeology. ISBN 9780473142179.
- Janet Davidson (2017). "Polynesian outliers". Grove Art Online. doi:10.1093/gao/9781884446054.article.t068541. Wikidata Q103962275.
- Davidson, Janet Marjorie (2019). The Cook Voyages Encounters: The Cook Voyages Collections of Te Papa. Wellington: Te Papa Press. ISBN 978-0-9941362-8-2. LCCN 2019458295. OCLC 1119497774. OL 32026188W. Wikidata Q125828404.
