= Rayforstia signata =

Conservation status
- Data Deficit (NZ TCS)

Scientific classification
- Kingdom: Animalia
- Phylum: Arthropoda
- Subphylum: Chelicerata
- Class: Arachnida
- Order: Araneae
- Infraorder: Araneomorphae
- Family: Anapidae
- Genus: Rayforstia
- Species: R. signata

Binomial name
- Rayforstia signata (Forster, 1959)

Synonyms
- Textricella signata

Species of spider

Rayforstia signata is a species of Anapidae that is endemic to New Zealand.

== Taxonomy ==
This species was described as Textricella signata in 1959 by Ray Forster from male and female specimens collected in Canterbury. In 2010 it was transferred to Rayforstia. The holotype is stored in Canterbury Museum.

== Description ==
The male is recorded at 1.21mm in length whereas the female is 1.31mm. This species has a deep golden brown carapace and pale yellow brown legs.

== Distribution ==
This species is only known from Canterbury, New Zealand.

== Conservation status ==
Under the New Zealand Threat Classification System, this species is listed as "Data Deficient" with the qualifiers of "Data Poor: Size" and "Data Poor: Trend".
