= Rayforstia mcfarlanei =

Conservation status
- Data Deficit (NZ TCS)

Scientific classification
- Kingdom: Animalia
- Phylum: Arthropoda
- Subphylum: Chelicerata
- Class: Arachnida
- Order: Araneae
- Infraorder: Araneomorphae
- Family: Anapidae
- Genus: Rayforstia
- Species: R. mcfarlanei

Binomial name
- Rayforstia mcfarlanei (Forster, 1959)

Synonyms
- Textricella mcfarlanei

Species of spider

Rayforstia mcfarlanei is a species of Anapidae spider that is endemic to New Zealand.

== Taxonomy ==
This species was described as Textricella insula in 1959 by Ray Forster from male and female specimens. In 2010 it was transferred to Rayforstia. The holotype is stored in Canterbury Museum.

== Description ==
The male is recorded at 1.15mm in length whereas the female is 1.13mm. This species has a deep golden brown carapace, pale yellow brown legs and dark golden brown abdomen.

== Distribution ==
This species is only known from Lake Ōhau, New Zealand.

== Conservation status ==
Under the New Zealand Threat Classification System, this species is listed as "Data Deficient" with the qualifiers of "Data Poor: Size", "Data Poor: Trend" and "One Location".
