= Anne Leahy (archaeologist) =

New Zealand archaeologist (1925–2023)

Anne Leahy (26 July 1925 – 27 June 2023) was a New Zealand archaeologist, active from 1949 to 1995.

== Biography ==
Leahy and Janet Davidson carried out excavations on pre-European sites at Station Bay on Motutapu Island. In 2006 Leahy was awarded the Groube Fieldwork Award from the New Zealand Archaeological Association.

Photographs by Leahy of excavations, and the items discovered during them, are held in the collections of the University of Auckland and the Auckland War Memorial Museum.

=== Publications ===
- Leahy, A. (1963). "An earthwork in Fiji". NZ Archaeological Association.
- Leahy, A.; Nicholls, E.M. (1964). "The Poor Knights Islands". NZ Archaeological Association.
- Leahy, Anne (1970). "Excavations at Site N38/30, Motutapu Island, New Zealand". Records of the Auckland Institute and Museum. 7: 61–82. ISSN 0067-0464. JSTOR 42906143. Wikidata Q58676848.
- Leahy, A. (1971). "Preliminary report and carbon 14 datings on site N44-69, Hot Water Beach, Coromandel". NZ Archaeological Association.
- Leahy, Anne (1972). "Further Excavations at Site N38/30, Motutapu Island, New Zealand". Records of the Auckland Institute and Museum. 9: 15–26 – via JSTOR.
- Leahy, A. (1976). "Whakamoenga cave, N94/7. : A report on the ecology, economy and stratigraphy". Records of the Auckland Institute and Museum. 13: 29–75 – via JSTOR.
- Leahy, A.; Walsh, W. (1980). "Field recording in the Waiapu and Tapuaeroa valleys, East Coast". NZ Archaeological Association.
- Leahy, A.; Walsh, W. (1982). "Site surveying in the eastern Bay or Plenty". NZ Archaeological Association.
- Leahy, A. (1986). "Excavations at site N38-140, Motutapu Island, Auckland". NZ Archaeological Association.
- Leahy, Anne (1991). "Excavations at Taylor's Hill, R11/96, Auckland". Records of the Auckland Institute and Museum. 28: 33–68. ISSN 0067-0464. JSTOR 42906413. Wikidata Q58677409.
- Leahy, Anne (2004). "Pig Bay Excavation, Motutapu Island, 1959: Reminiscences of My First Dig, Queen's Birthday Weekend". Archaeology in New Zealand. 47: 170–171.
