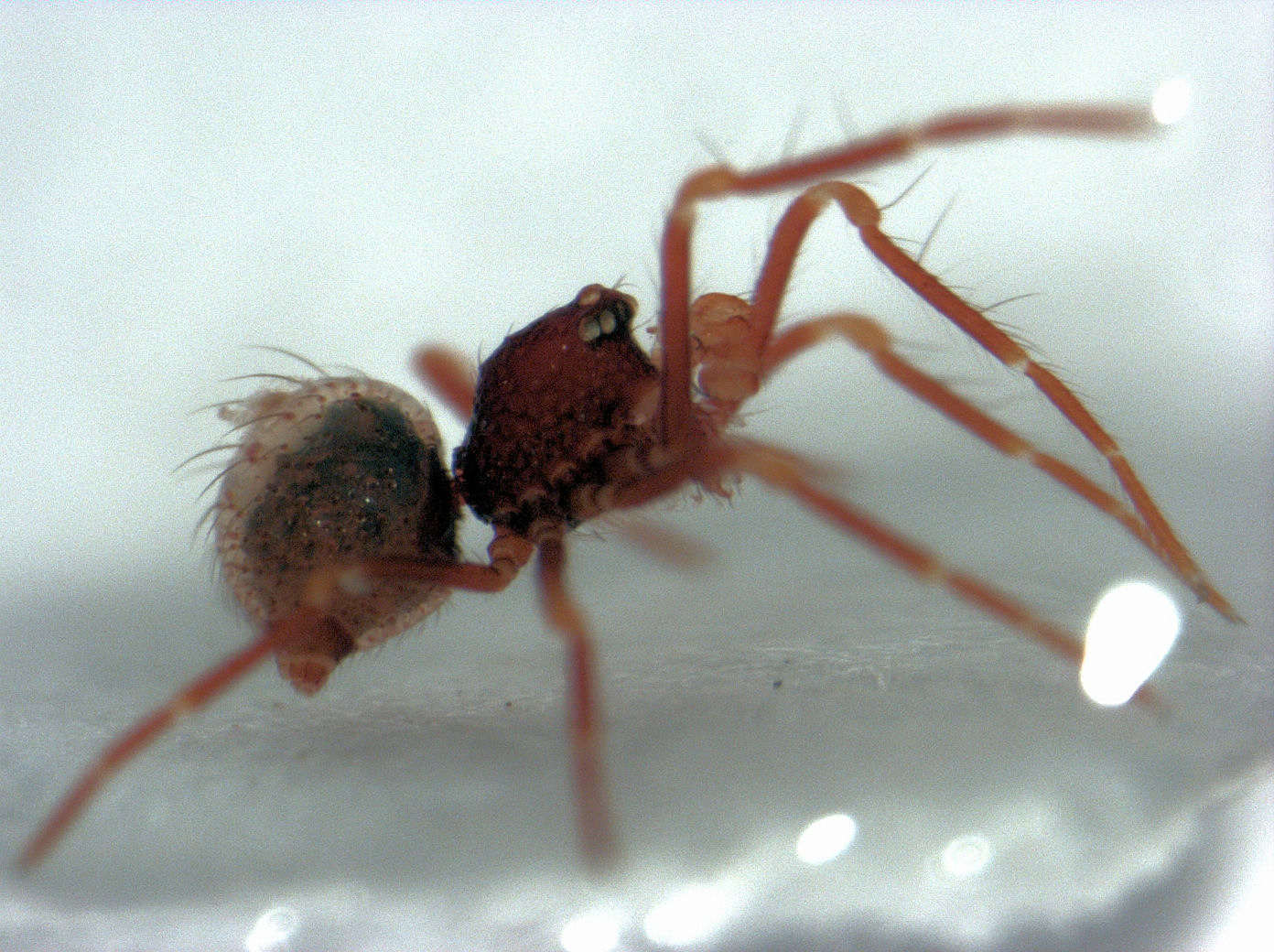

Conservation status
- Not Threatened (NZ TCS)

Scientific classification
- Kingdom: Animalia
- Phylum: Arthropoda
- Subphylum: Chelicerata
- Class: Arachnida
- Order: Araneae
- Infraorder: Araneomorphae
- Family: Anapidae
- Genus: Taphiassa
- Species: T. punctata

Binomial name
- Taphiassa punctata (Forster, 1959)

Synonyms
- Parapua punctata

= Taphiassa punctata =

Species of spider

Taphiassa punctata is a species of Anapidae that is endemic to New Zealand.

== Taxonomy ==
This species was described as Parapua punctata in 1959 by Ray Forster from male and female specimens collected in Canterbury. In 2010 it was transferred to Taphiassa. The holotype is stored in Canterbury Museum.

== Description ==
The male is recorded at 1.18mm in length whereas the female is 1.26mm. This species has a reddish brown carapace. The abdomen is deep reddish brown and blackish grey. The legs are yellow brown.

== Distribution ==
This species is known from the North Island and South Island of New Zealand.

== Conservation status ==
Under the New Zealand Threat Classification System, this species is listed as "Not Threatened".
