= Ahua dentata =

Conservation status
- Naturally Uncommon (NZ TCS)

Scientific classification
- Kingdom: Animalia
- Phylum: Arthropoda
- Subphylum: Chelicerata
- Class: Arachnida
- Order: Araneae
- Infraorder: Araneomorphae
- Family: Agelenidae
- Genus: Ahua
- Species: A. dentata

Binomial name
- Ahua dentata Forster & Wilton, 1973

Species of spider

Ahua dentata is a species of Agelenidae that is endemic to New Zealand.

== Taxonomy ==
This species was described in 1973 by Ray Forster and Cecil Wilton from male and female specimens. The holotype is stored in Canterbury Museum.

== Description ==
The male is recorded at 2.04mm in length whereas the female is 2.28mm. The carapace is coloured pale yellow brown and has dark shading dorsally. The legs are orange brown with dark markings. The abdomen is shaded with black, almost appearing mottled with cream.

== Distribution ==
This species is only known from Canterbury, New Zealand.

== Conservation status ==
Under the New Zealand Threat Classification System, this species is listed as "Naturally Uncommon" with the qualifiers of "Range Restricted".
