= Tuapoka ovalis =

Conservation status
- Not Threatened (NZ TCS)

Scientific classification
- Kingdom: Animalia
- Phylum: Arthropoda
- Subphylum: Chelicerata
- Class: Arachnida
- Order: Araneae
- Infraorder: Araneomorphae
- Family: Agelenidae
- Genus: Tuapoka
- Species: T. ovalis

Binomial name
- Tuapoka ovalis Forster & Wilton, 1973

Species of spider

Tuapoka ovalis is a species of Agelenidae that is endemic to New Zealand.

== Taxonomy ==
his species was described in 1973 by Ray Forster and Cecil Wilton from female and male specimens. The holotype is stored in Canterbury Museum.

== Description ==
The female is recorded at 1.6mm in length whereas the male is 1.5mm. The cephalothorax and legs are coloured straw yellow. The abdomen is creamy.

== Distribution ==
This species is widespread throughout New Zealand.

== Conservation status ==
Under the New Zealand Threat Classification System, this species is listed as "Not Threatened".
