= Rayforstia antipoda =

Conservation status
- Data Deficit (NZ TCS)

Scientific classification
- Kingdom: Animalia
- Phylum: Arthropoda
- Subphylum: Chelicerata
- Class: Arachnida
- Order: Araneae
- Infraorder: Araneomorphae
- Family: Anapidae
- Genus: Rayforstia
- Species: R. antipoda

Binomial name
- Rayforstia antipoda (Forster, 1959)

Synonyms
- Textricella antipoda

Species of spider

Rayforstia antipoda is a species of Anapidae that is endemic to New Zealand.

== Taxonomy ==
This species was described as Textricella antipoda in 1959 by Ray Forster from male and female specimens collected near Lake Hāwea. In 2010 it was transferred to Rayforstia. The holotype is stored in Canterbury Museum.

== Description ==
The male is recorded at 1.02mm in length whereas the female is 1.15mm. This species has a deep gold brown carapace, pale brown legs and deep gold brown abdomen.

== Distribution ==
This species is only known from Otago, New Zealand.

== Conservation status ==
Under the New Zealand Threat Classification System, this species is listed as "Data Deficient" with the qualifiers of "Data Poor: Size", "Data Poor: Trend" and "One Location".
