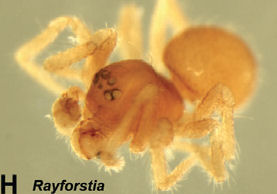

Conservation status
- Not Threatened (NZ TCS)

Scientific classification
- Kingdom: Animalia
- Phylum: Arthropoda
- Subphylum: Chelicerata
- Class: Arachnida
- Order: Araneae
- Infraorder: Araneomorphae
- Family: Anapidae
- Genus: Rayforstia
- Species: R. vulgaris

Binomial name
- Rayforstia vulgaris (Forster, 1959)

Synonyms
- Textricella vulgaris

= Rayforstia vulgaris =

Species of spider

Rayforstia vulgaris is a species of Anapidae that is endemic to New Zealand.

== Taxonomy ==
This species was described as Textricella plebeia in 1959 by Ray Forster from male and female specimens. In 2010 it was transferred to Rayforstia. It is the type species of the Rayforstia genus. The holotype is stored in Canterbury Museum.

== Description ==
The male is recorded at 1.06mm in length whereas the female is 1.1mm.

== Distribution ==
This species is restricted to the South Island of New Zealand, primarily in the western section but can also be found in Canterbury.

== Conservation status ==
Under the New Zealand Threat Classification System, this species is listed as "Not Threatened".
