= Rayforstia propinqua =

Conservation status
- Not Threatened (NZ TCS)

Scientific classification
- Kingdom: Animalia
- Phylum: Arthropoda
- Subphylum: Chelicerata
- Class: Arachnida
- Order: Araneae
- Infraorder: Araneomorphae
- Family: Anapidae
- Genus: Rayforstia
- Species: R. plebeia

Binomial name
- Rayforstia plebeia (Forster, 1959)

Synonyms
- Textricella propinqua

Species of spider

Rayforstia propinqua is a species of Anapidae that is endemic to New Zealand.

== Taxonomy ==
This species was described as Textricella plebeia in 1959 by Ray Forster from male and female specimens. In 2010 it was transferred to Rayforstia. The holotype is stored in Canterbury Museum.

== Description ==
The male is recorded at 1.31mm in length whereas the female is 1.25mm.

== Distribution ==
This species is widespread in the South Island of New Zealand.

== Conservation status ==
Under the New Zealand Threat Classification System, this species is listed as "Not Threatened".
