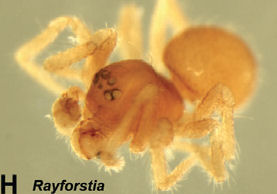
- Rayforstia vulgaris

Scientific classification
- Kingdom: Animalia
- Phylum: Arthropoda
- Subphylum: Chelicerata
- Class: Arachnida
- Order: Araneae
- Infraorder: Araneomorphae
- Family: Anapidae
- Genus: Rayforstia; Harvey

Type species
- Rayforstia vulgaris

Species
- 12, see text

= Rayforstia =

Genus of spiders

Rayforstia is a genus of spiders in the family Anapidae. It was first described in 2010 by Rix & Harvey. As of 2026, it contains 12 species.

== Species ==
Rayforstia comprises the following species:

- Rayforstia antipoda (Forster, 1959)
- Rayforstia insula (Forster, 1959)
- Rayforstia lordhowensis Rix & Harvey, 2010
- Rayforstia mcfarlanei (Forster, 1959)
- Rayforstia plebeia (Forster, 1959)
- Rayforstia propinqua (Forster, 1959)
- Rayforstia raveni Rix & Harvey, 2010
- Rayforstia salmoni (Forster, 1959)
- Rayforstia scuta (Forster, 1959)
- Rayforstia signata (Forster, 1959)
- Rayforstia vulgaris (Forster, 1959)
- Rayforstia wisei (Forster, 1964)
