= Rayforstia salmoni =

Conservation status
- Not Threatened (NZ TCS)

Scientific classification
- Kingdom: Animalia
- Phylum: Arthropoda
- Subphylum: Chelicerata
- Class: Arachnida
- Order: Araneae
- Infraorder: Araneomorphae
- Family: Anapidae
- Genus: Rayforstia
- Species: R. salmoni

Binomial name
- Rayforstia salmoni (Forster, 1959)

Synonyms
- Textricella salmoni

Species of spider

Rayforstia salmoni is a species of Anapidae that is endemic to New Zealand.

== Taxonomy ==
This species was described as Textricella salmoni in 1959 by Ray Forster from male and female specimens. In 2010 it was transferred to Rayforstia. The holotype is stored in Te Papa Museum under registration number AS.000103.

== Description ==
The male is recorded at 1.1mm in length whereas the female is 1.14mm.

== Distribution ==
This species is known from the North Island of New Zealand.

== Conservation status ==
Under the New Zealand Threat Classification System, this species is listed as "Not Threatened".
