= Statue of William Rolleston =

Statue in Christchurch, New Zealand

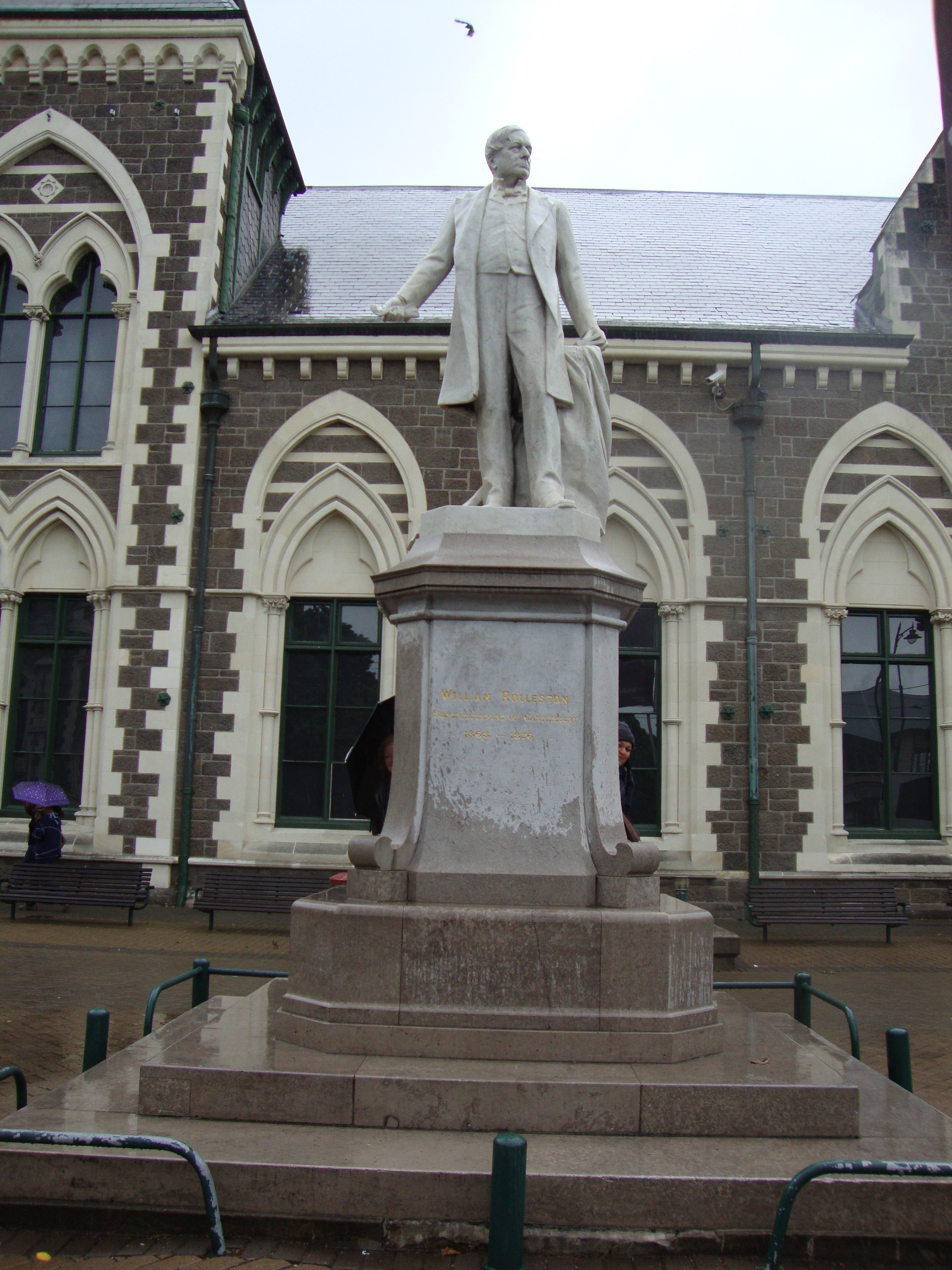
- Rolleston Statue outside the Canterbury Museum in November 2010

- Artist: Herbert Hampton
- Year: 1906
- Catalogue: 1946
- Medium: White marble
- Subject: William Rolleston
- Designation: Category II historic place
- Location: Canterbury Museum, Christchurch
- 43.5309°S 172.6275°E

Heritage New Zealand – Category 2
- Designated: 26 November 1981
- Reference no.: 1946

The Rolleston Statue is a white marble statue situated outside Canterbury Museum on Rolleston Avenue in Christchurch, New Zealand. It commemorates William Rolleston, who was Superintendent of the Canterbury Province from 1868 until 1877.

The statue was unveiled on 26 May 1906 by Sir John Hall KCMG, Mayor of Christchurch and personal friend, who writes the "City Council arrived in carriages to Statue". The Rolleston Statue fell off its plinth in the 2011 Christchurch earthquake, suffering damage repaired in 2016.

== History ==
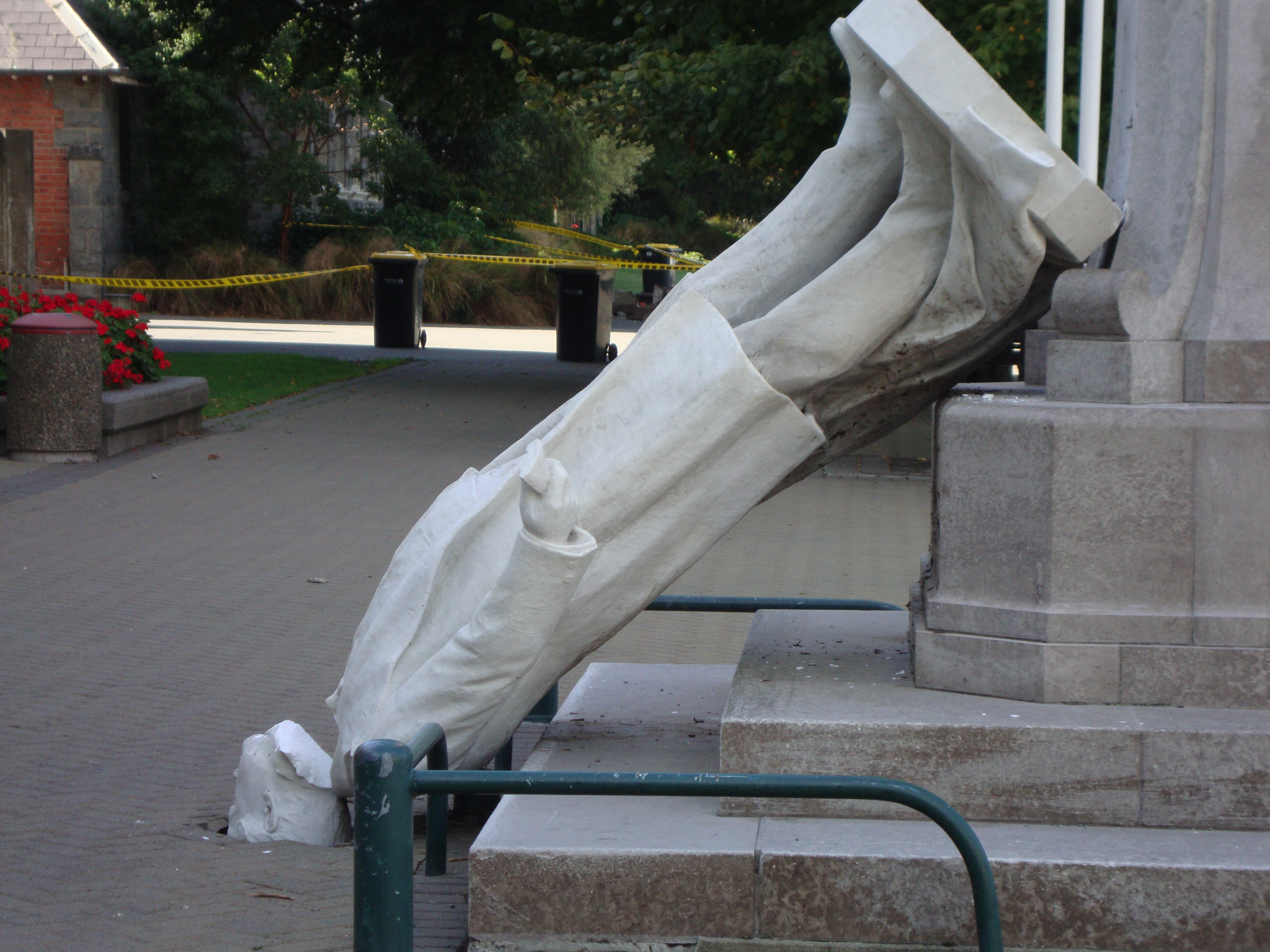
Toppled statue with the head broken off after the February 2011 earthquake

Rolleston was the fourth and last Canterbury Superintendent. He was also a Member of Parliament, from 1868 to 1899 with two breaks in the later years. Rolleston died in 1903.

Rolleston was the politician who had been instrumental in the establishment of the Canterbury Museum and the Canterbury College, which now houses the Arts Centre. It was thus seen as appropriate to place the statue outside the museum, with Rolleston looking across Antigua Street (with this section since renamed to Rolleston Avenue) at the Canterbury College.

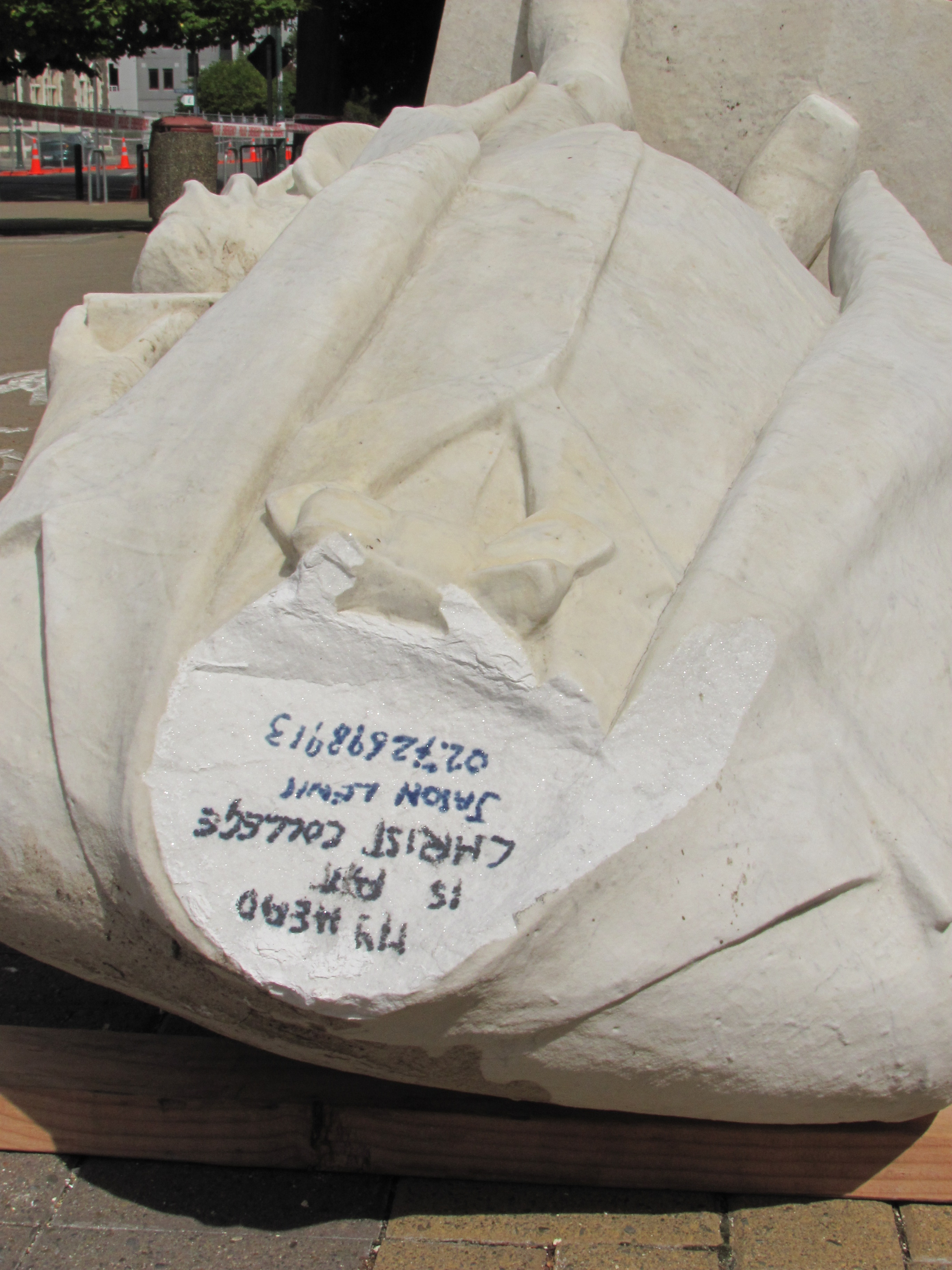
"My head is at Christ College"

The statue, by English sculptor Herbert Hampton, was unveiled in 1906, where it stood on a stone plinth. The plinth reads: "William Rolleston Superintendent of Canterbury 1866–1876."

At the time of its unveiling, the sculpture was regarded as a good likeness of Rolleston though has been criticised in more recent times as being "rigid" and "lacking surface interest" when compared to the other Christchurch statues sculpted by Thomas Woolner and George Lawson. The statue toppled off its plinth during the February 2011 Christchurch earthquake and the head broke off. During repairs, it was discovered that the statue had simply been mortared into place. An anchor was fitted so that the statue will not topple over again in future earthquakes. The repaired statue was unveiled, with many of Rolleston's descendants present, on 21 December 2016; almost six years after the earthquake.

== Heritage listing ==
On 26 November 1981, the statue was registered by Heritage New Zealand as a Category II historic place, with the registration number being 1946. It is one of the three statues that commemorate superintendents of Canterbury (the other statues commemorate James FitzGerald and William Sefton Moorhouse) and they are all placed on Rolleston Avenue (Moorhouse's statue is some distance inside the Botanic Gardens). The three statues thus form an important historical setting.
