= Harry Dansey =

NZ journalist, cartoonist, writer, broadcaster and politician

Harry Dansey MBE

2nd Race Relations Conciliator
- In office 1975 – October 1979
- Preceded by: Sir Guy Powles
- Succeeded by: Hiwi Tauroa

Member of Auckland City Council
- In office 1971 – 1977

Personal details
- Born: Harry Delamere Barter Dansey; 1 November 1920 Greenlane, Auckland, New Zealand
- Died: 6 November 1979 (aged 59)
- Resting place: Muruika Cemetery, Ohinemutu, Rotorua, New Zealand
- Spouse: Te Rina Makarita (Lena Margret) Hikaka (m. 1943)
- Relations: Georgie Dansey (great-niece)
- Children: 4
- Occupation: Journalist, cartoonist, writer, broadcaster, local politician

Military service
- Allegiance: New Zealand
- Branch/service: New Zealand Army
- Years of service: ?–1946
- Rank: Sergeant
- Unit: Māori Battalion
- Battles/wars: World War II; North African campaign; Italian campaign

Harry Delamere Barter Dansey MBE (1 November 1920 – 6 November 1979) was a New Zealand Māori journalist, cartoonist, writer, broadcaster, local politician, and race relations conciliator.

== Early life ==
Harry Dansey was born in Greenlane, Auckland, New Zealand, to Harry Delamere Dansey, a civil engineer, and his wife, Winifred Patience Dansey (née Barter). He was of Ngāti Rauhoto of Ngāti Tūwharetoa and Tuhourangi of Te Arawa, with connections to Ngāti Raukawa.

Dansey began his education at Remuera Primary School in the Auckland suburb of Remuera. His family moved to Rotorua in 1930, where he completed the rest of his primary education and then high school from 1934 to 1939. He had a knack for English, and his father instilled in him a love for Māori culture, somewhat influencing his career.

He married Te Rina Makarita (Lena Margret) Hikaka on 19 May 1943, at Oeo, near the town of Manaia, Taranaki.

He was a member of the 28th (Māori) Battalion during World War II in North Africa and Italy. Dansey often scouted ahead to gather intelligence information to aid the advancement of the battalion. This required him to sketch landscapes and buildings, which he enjoyed. He was discharged from the Army in 1946, reaching the rank of sergeant.

== Journalism career ==
Dansey first started his journalism career when he completed an apprenticeship with the Hawera Star before moving on to become editor and part-owner of the Rangitikei News. His family then moved to New Plymouth, where he took up a position with the Taranaki Daily News in 1952. From 1956 to 1961, he was their cartoonist and leader writer, one of the few Māori to be an editorial cartoonist. At the Taranaki Daily News, he drew a comic strip with two characters, Tom Tiki (a Māori leprechaun) and his cat Puss. His humour was gentle, he used Māori culture to satirise Pākehā, and he acknowledged Māori and European cultural influences in New Zealand while having a deep knowledge of Māori culture.

He also enjoyed the freedom of freelance journalism and social commentary, contributing to the Māori-aimed magazine Te Ao Hou / The New World, and commenting on Māori issues on the radio. This led to him and his family moving to Auckland, where he earned the position of writer on Māori and Pacific Island affairs at the Auckland Star.

In 1969 Dansey participated in the Cook Bicentenary Expedition to Rarotonga, Tonga and the Cook Islands acting as the New Zealand Press Association correspondent for the expedition.

Dansey wrote a full-length play in 1971, Te Raukura: The Feathers of the Albatross, which was first performed in 1972 at the Auckland Festival.

In the 1974 New Year Honours, Dansey was appointed a Member of the Order of the British Empire for services to journalism and the community.

== Race relations conciliator ==
Dansey was appointed New Zealand's second Race Relations Conciliator in 1975. This entailed investigating complaints and mediation. He stressed the need for people to respect other cultures, and he consulted and trained in business, government, legal, and professional organisations. He believed that New Zealand would develop its own unique culture, derived from both Māori and European culture. Dansey became a member of the Human Rights Commission in 1978. In 1977, Dansey was awarded the Queen Elizabeth II Silver Jubilee Medal.

== Other interests and vocations ==
Dansey was elected to the Auckland City Council in 1971, serving until 1977. A reserve in Central Auckland was named in his honour, recognising his contribution to the city. As a medallist, he designed in 1972 a medallion that was issued by the Pacific Commemorative Society to commemorate 600 years of Māori occupation of Tamaki-Makau-Rau. In 1973, he moved to the Department of Māori Affairs to further develop the department's public relations profile.

Besides journalism, politics, cartooning, and theatre, Dansey became interested in radio broadcasting and subsequently became one of 1ZB's first talkback hosts, and was a frequent contributor to current affairs programmes.

== Later life and death ==
Dansey retired from his role as race relations conciliator in October 1979, dying a few weeks later. He was survived by his wife, three sons, and one daughter. He was buried with his relatives at Muruika Cemetery in Ohinemutu, Rotorua. His great-niece Georgie Dansey is a New Zealand MP.

== Books ==
Works by Dansey

- How the Māoris came to Aotearoa (1947)
- The Māori people (1958)
- Cartoons on international affairs (1958)
- The New Zealand Māori in colour (1963)
- Māori custom today (1971)

Other works

- How the Māoris came – Written by A.W. Reed and illustrated by Dansey
