= Michael Trotter (archaeologist) =

New Zealand archaeologist (born 1935)

- Born: 1935 (age 90–91); New Zealand

Academic work
- Discipline: Archaeology
- Institutions: Canterbury Museum, Christchurch

Michael Malthus Trotter (born 1935) is a New Zealand archaeologist, with a particular interest in the archaeology of Māori in the South Island as well as Polynesian archaeology in the South Pacific.

== Biography ==
Born in 1935, Trotter was educated at Waitaki Boys' High School in Oamaru. He became interested in archeology as a teenager, participating in excavations in Otago under the supervision of Harry Skinner, the director of the Otago Museum at the time. He subsequently worked on digs alongside Roger Duff, Wal Ambrose and Jack Golson. He studied at the University of Canterbury from which he graduated with a Bachelor of Science.

In 1965, Trotter became the archeologist at the Canterbury Museum in Christchurch, a position which he held until 1983. As well as his excavation work in the South Island of New Zealand, which focused on the pre-European Māori, Trotter participated in archaeological expeditions to the South Pacific. He was involved in digs in the Southern Cook Islands including, in 1969, the first archaeological survey of the island of Atiu. He performed similar work on Niue Island two years later.

Trotter published extensively, writing several articles and monographs for, among others, the Records of Canterbury Museum, the New Zealand Archaeological Association, and the Journal of the Polynesian Society. He also became a member of the archaeological committee of the New Zealand Historic Places Trust. In 1983, Trotter became the director of the Canterbury Museum, a role in which he remained for twelve years. He left the Canterbury Museum in 1995, intending to focus on writing up his research.

In his retirement, Trotter bred cattle and goats at his lifestyle property at Tuahiwi, in North Canterbury.

== Select publications ==
- Prehistoric Rock Art of New Zealand – coauthor with Beverly McCulloch (1971)
- Unearthing New Zealand – coauthor with Beverly McCulloch (1989)
- Digging up the Past: New Zealand's Archaeological History – coauthor with Beverly McCulloch and John Wilson (1997)
