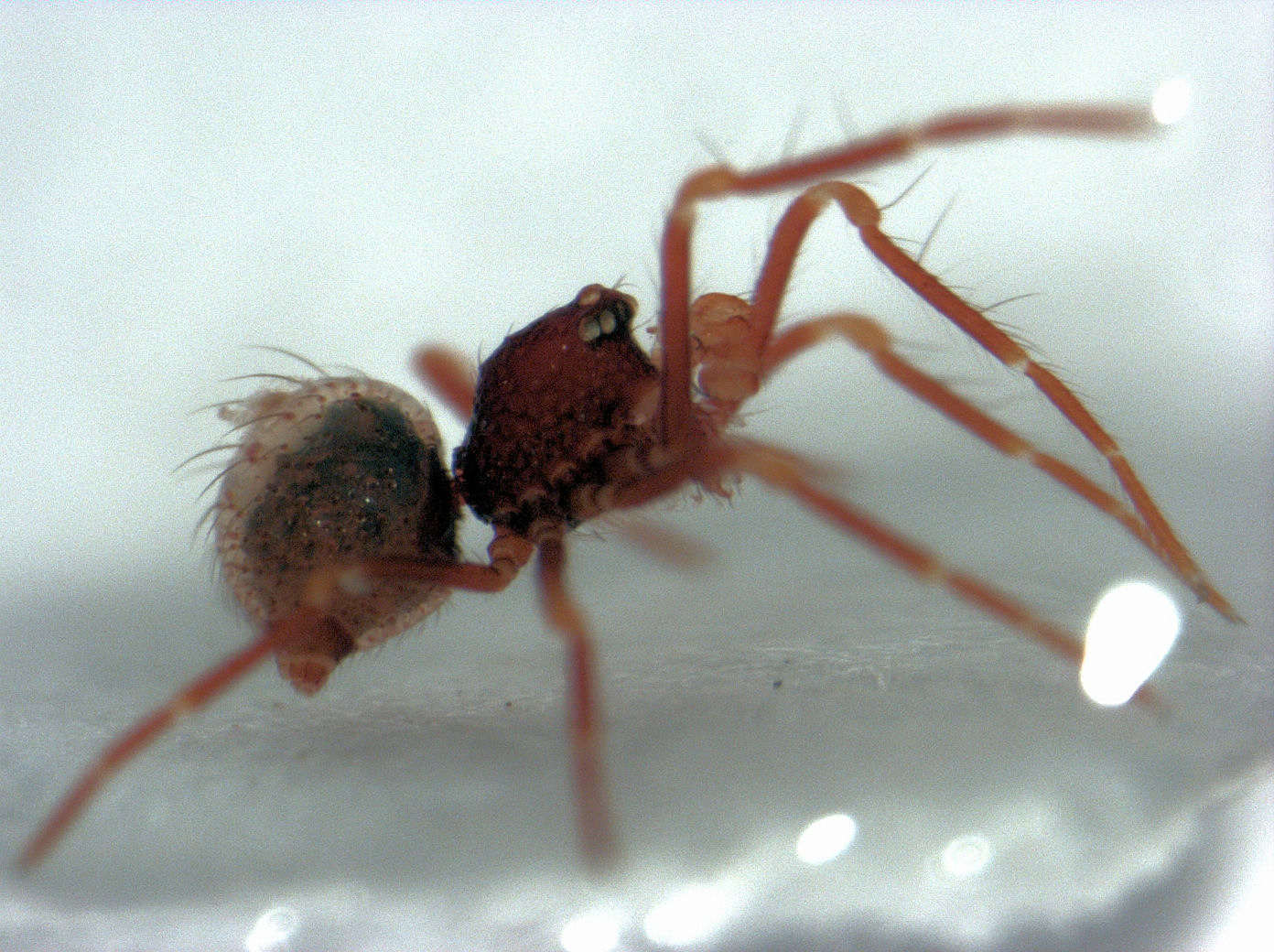
- Taphiassa punctata

Scientific classification
- Kingdom: Animalia
- Phylum: Arthropoda
- Subphylum: Chelicerata
- Class: Arachnida
- Order: Araneae
- Infraorder: Araneomorphae
- Family: Anapidae
- Genus: Taphiassa; Simon

Type species
- Taphiassa impressa

Species
- 7, see text

= Taphiassa =

Genus of spiders

Taphiassa is a genus of spiders in the family Anapidae. It was first described in 1880 by Simon. As of 2026, it contains 6 species.

== Species ==
Taphiassa comprises the following species:

- Taphiassa castanea Rix & Harvey, 2010
- Taphiassa globosa Rix & Harvey, 2010
- Taphiassa impressa Simon, 1880
- Taphiassa magna Rix & Harvey, 2010
- Taphiassa punctata (Forster, 1959)
- Taphiassa punctigera Simon, 1895
- Taphiassa robertsi Rix & Harvey, 2010
