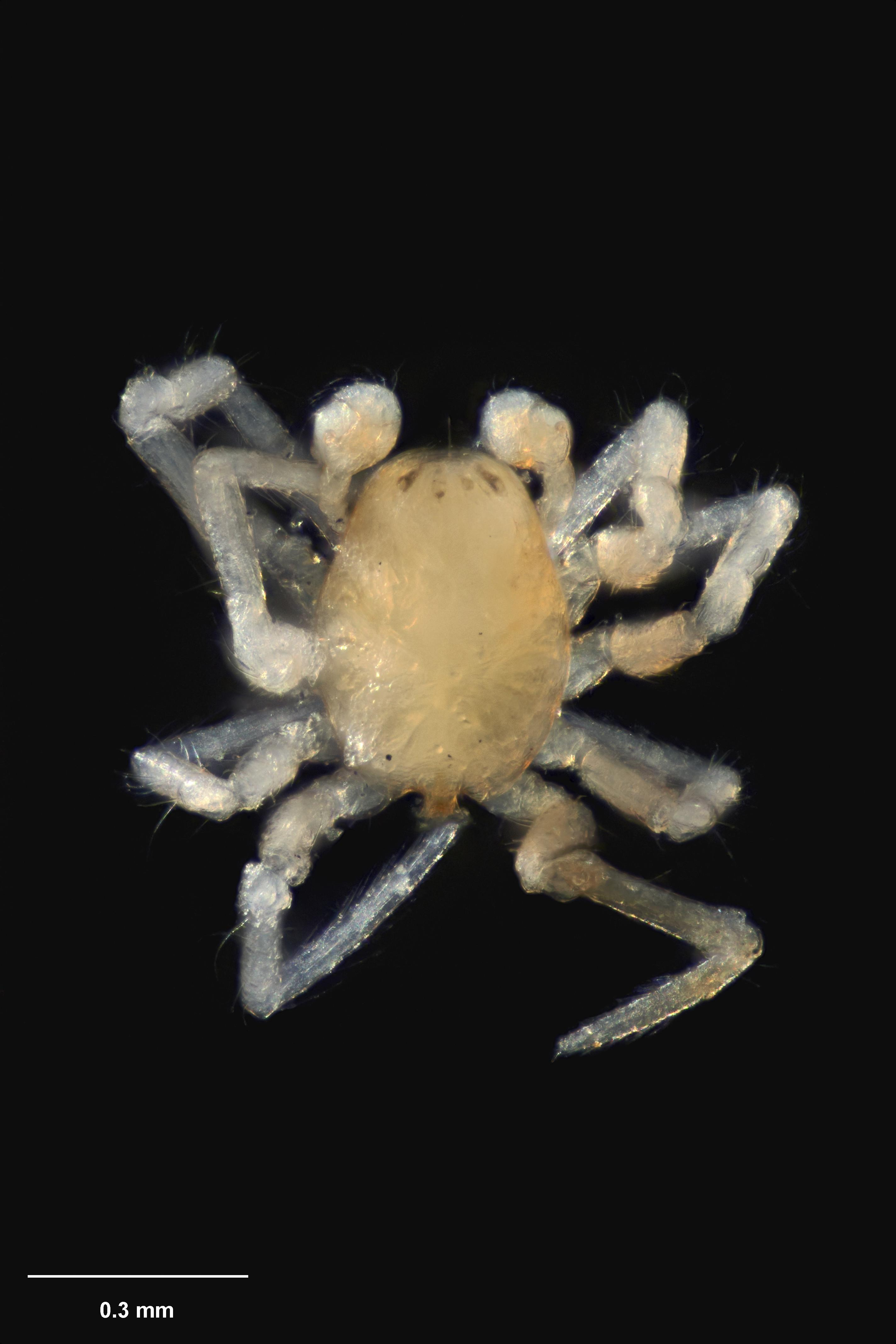

Conservation status
- Naturally Uncommon (NZ TCS)

Scientific classification
- Kingdom: Animalia
- Phylum: Arthropoda
- Subphylum: Chelicerata
- Class: Arachnida
- Order: Araneae
- Infraorder: Araneomorphae
- Family: Anapidae
- Genus: Rayforstia
- Species: R. wisei

Binomial name
- Rayforstia wisei (Forster, 1964)

Synonyms
- Textricella wisei

= Rayforstia wisei =

Species of spider

Rayforstia wisei is a species of Anapidae that is endemic to New Zealand.

== Taxonomy ==
This species was described as Textricella wisei in 1964 by Ray Forster from male and female specimens. In 2010 it was transferred to Rayforstia. The holotype is stored in Te Papa Museum under registration number AS.000125.

== Description ==
The male is recorded at 0.89mm in length whereas the female is 1.04mm. This species has a pale yellow carapace and legs. The abdomen is yellow brown (creamy white in females).

== Distribution ==
This species is only known from Campbell Island, New Zealand.

== Conservation status ==
Under the New Zealand Threat Classification System, this species is listed as "Naturally Uncommon" with the qualifiers of "Island Endemic" and "One Location".
