= David Stoddart (geographer) =

British physical geographer

David R. Stoddart
- Born: 15 November 1937; Stockton-on-Tees, England
- Died: 23 November 2014 (aged 77); Berkeley, California, US
- Education: University of Cambridge (BA, MA, PhD.)
- Scientific career
- Fields: biogeography, coral reefs, atolls
- Workplaces: University of Cambridge; University of California, Berkeley

David Ross Stoddart, OBE (15 November 1937 – 23 November 2014) was a British physical geographer known for the study of coral reefs and atolls. He was also known for key works on the history and philosophy of geography as an academic discipline. He was a lecturer at the University of Cambridge, and then professor and later emeritus professor at the University of California, Berkeley.

== Early and private life ==
Stoddart grew up in Stockton-on-Tees, northeast England. His parents both served in France during the First World War, his father with the Royal Flying Corps and his mother as a nurse. His father later became an engineer working in the construction of heavy industrial buildings for Ashmore, Benson, and Pease (later Davy International; now part of Siemens). He had two siblings.

He married fellow Cambridge geographer June in 1961 and had a daughter, Aldabra (named after the island) and a son, Michael. He collected a very large private library in Berkeley.

Stoddart suffered from diabetes and skin cancer in later life. He died in Berkeley, California, on 23 November 2014.

== Academic career ==
Stoddart was possibly the first person from his local grammar school (now demolished) to enter the University of Cambridge, in 1956 (a schoolfriend secured a place at Oxford). He studied tropical geography at St.John's College with Alfred Steers from 1956, graduating with a first class degree in 1959. His introduction to coral reefs came on the Cambridge Expedition to British Honduras (Belize), 1959–60. He returned there for further research into corals and the plants of the cays, working for Louisiana State University before and after a major hurricane, tracking its effects on atolls and reefs. He gained a Cambridge PhD for this work in 1964 and was appointed lecturer in geography at Cambridge, rising through the ranks. He was a fellow of Churchill College, Cambridge from 1966 to 1987. In the mid-1980s he was a Regents Fellow at the Smithsonian.

He was appointed chair of department and professor of geography at the University of California, Berkeley in 1988, holding the headship until 1994, when he was forced aside by the dean. The department had internal conflicts, and Stoddart had managed these effectively for the first few years, hiring several new staff. Ill health was cited when he retired from Berkeley in 2000.

Stoddart studied the geomorphology and ecology of tropical islands and reefs, beginning in Belize, then the Maldives, Seychelles, Solomon Islands, and various locations in the Pacific including the Great Barrier Reef, Aitutaki in the Cook Islands, and in the mid-1970s to the disputed Phoenix Islands. His particular focus was documenting the plant assemblages present on atolls, making links to evolutionary biology. He also studied the evolution of atolls since the Pleistocene.

In the mid-1960s, accompanying a military expedition, he discovered great biodiversity and documented the huge tortoise populations on the Seychelles island of Aldabra, and the scientific work on its habitat was instrumental in stopping the construction of a British military airfield. The island became a World Heritage Site in 1982. In 1967, a similar expedition went to Diego Garcia, one of the Chagos Islands, prior to its appropriation for a controversial American base.

In 1969 Stoddart participated in the Cook Bicentenary Expedition to Rarotonga, Tonga and the Cook Islands.

The decline in interest and status of the discipline of climatic geomorphology was in part indebted to a 1969 publication of Stoddart. Stoddart criticized climatic geomorphology for applying supposedly "trivial" methodologies in establishing landform differences between morphoclimatic zones, being linked to Davisian geomorphology and by allegedly neglecting the fact that physical laws governing processes are the same across the globe.

He also held an interest in the history of geographic thought, publishing a major book On Geography and Its History in 1986 and several articles about the discipline, and on the contribution of Darwin's work to understanding the Earth. A parallel program on the morphology and hydrodynamics of salt marshes was largely conducted in the UK. He also studied mangroves and sedimentation.

He published work in the Smithsonian Institution's Atoll Research Bulletin. He was also one of the founders of the journal Progress in Geography, and the first co-ordinating editor of the journal Coral Reefs. He was a co-founder and first president of the International Society for Reef Studies and helped to establish the quadrennial International Coral Reef Symposium. He was also involved in the establishment of the International Year of the Reef in 1997, and of the Global Coral Reef Monitoring Network.

== Recognition ==
- Ness Award, Royal Geographical Society, 1965
- Prix Manley-Bendall, Institut Oceanographique de Monaco and the Sociéte Oceanographique de Paris, 1972.
- Darwin Medal of the International Society for Reef Studies, 1988 (first recipient).
- Officer of the Order of the British Empire (OBE), 1979.
- Founder's Medal of the Royal Geographical Society, 1979.
- Livingstone Medal of the Royal Scottish Geographical Society, 1981.
- Herbert E. Gregory Medal of the Pacific Science Association, 1986.
- Fellow of the American Association for the Advancement of Science, 2000.
- George Davidson Medal of the American Geographical Society, 2001.
- There is a David Stoddart scholarship at the University of Seychelles, based on his protection of Aldabra from military use.

== Key Publications ==
- Stoddart, D.R. (eds.) 1996. Process and form in geomorphology. London: Routledge.
- Stoddart, D.R. 1994. Theory and reality: the success and failure of the deductive method in coral reef studies: Darwin to Davis. Earth Sciences History 13, 21–34
- Ellison, J.C., & Stoddart, D.R. 1991. Mangrove ecosystem collapse during predicted sea-level rise: Holocene analogues and implications. Journal of Coastal Research 151–165.
- Stoddart, D.R. 1994. `This coral episode': Darwin, Dana, and the coral reefs of the Pacific. Darwin and the Pacific: essays on evolutionary theory and natural history in the laboratory of the Pacific 1840–1920, edited by R.M. MacLeod and P.F. Rehbock. Honolulu: University of Hawaii Press, 21–48.
- Ellison, J.C. & Stoddart, D.R. 1991. Mangrove ecosystem collapse during predicted sea-level rise: Holocene analogues and implications. Journal of Coastal Research 151–165.
- Stoddart, D.R. 1987. To claim the high ground: geography for the end of the century. Transactions of the Institute of British Geographers 327–336.
- Stoddart, D.R. 1986. On geography and its history. New York: Blackwell.
- Stoddart, D.R. and R. Johannes (eds.). 1978. Coral Reef Research Methods. UNESCO.
- Stoddart D.R., R.F. McLean, T.P. Scoffin, B.G. Thom and D. Hopley. 1978. Evolution of Reefs and Islands, Northern Great Barrier Reef: Synthesis and Interpretation. Phil. Trans. R. Soc. Lond. B. 284(999):149–159.
- Johnston R.J, D.Gregory, P.Haggett, D.M.Smith & D.R.Stoddart. 1981. The Dictionary of Human Geography. Oxford: Blackwell.
- Stoddart, D.R. 1972. Catastrophic damage to coral-reef communities by Madang earthquake 1970. Nature 239, 51.
- Stoddart, D.R. 1969. Ecology and morphology of recent coral reefs. Biological Reviews 44(4), 433–498.
- Stoddart, D.R. 1966. Darwin's impact on geography. Annals of the Association of American Geographers 56(4), 683–698.
- Stoddart, D. R. 1965. Geography and the ecological approach. The ecosystem as a geographic principle and method. Geography, 50(3), 242–251.
- Over 40 papers in the Atoll Research Bulletin, Smithsonian Institution, 1960s–2000s.
