= Rayforstia raveni =

Scientific classification
- Kingdom: Animalia
- Phylum: Arthropoda
- Subphylum: Chelicerata
- Class: Arachnida
- Order: Araneae
- Infraorder: Araneomorphae
- Family: Anapidae
- Genus: Rayforstia
- Species: R. raveni

Binomial name
- Rayforstia raveni Rix & Harvey, 2010

Species of spider

Rayforstia raveni is a species of Anapidae that is endemic to New Zealand. The species was first described by Michael G. Rix and Mark Harvey in 2010.
