= Louise Furey =

New Zealand archaeologist and curator

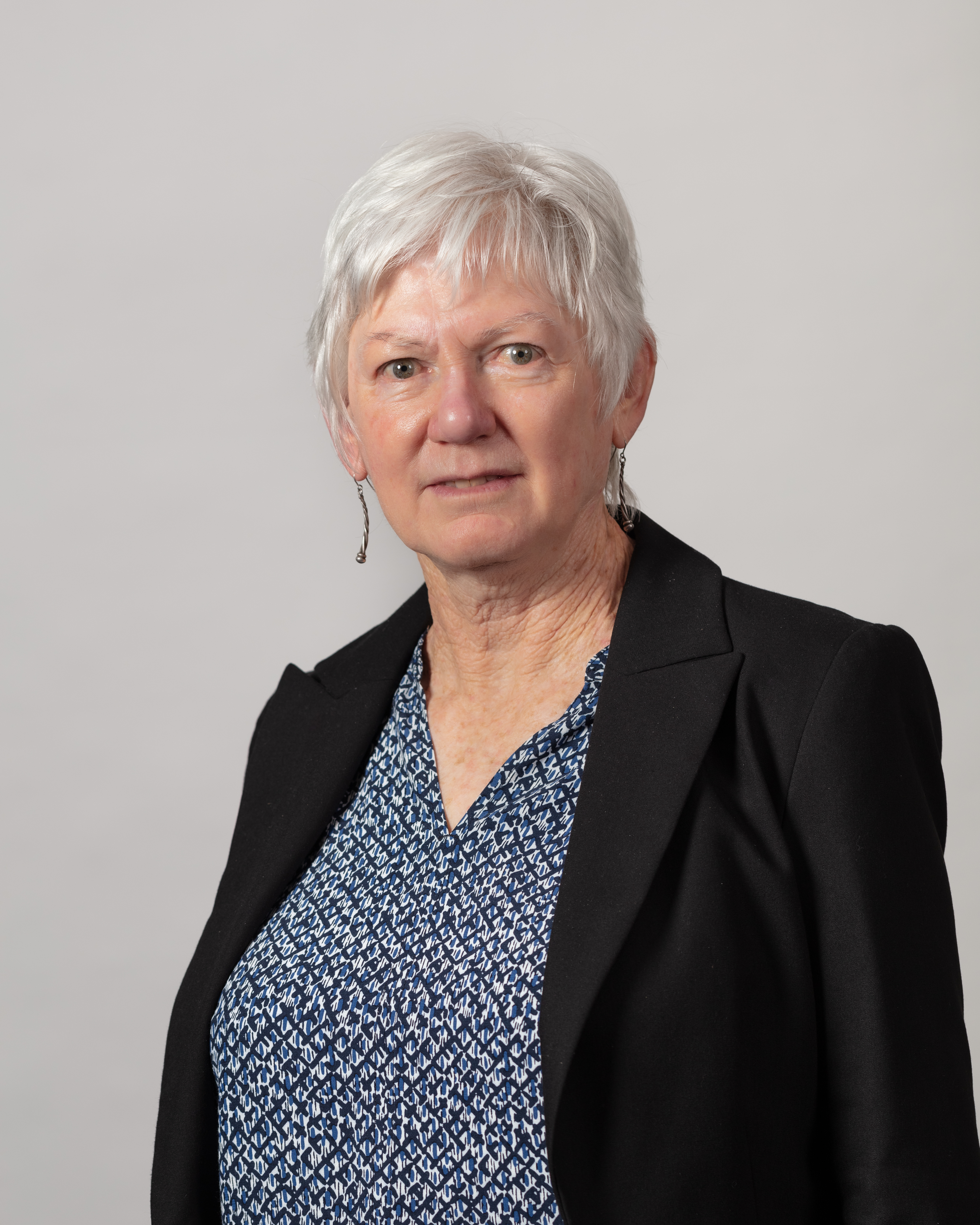
- Furey in 2021, photographed for Te Mana o Rangitāhua project
- Occupation: Curator of archaeology

Academic background
- Education: University of Auckland (MA, DSc)

Academic work
- Discipline: New Zealand archaeology
- Institutions: Auckland War Memorial Museum

Margaret Louise Furey is a New Zealand archaeologist. Formerly a consulting archaeologist, she is now Curator of Archaeology at Auckland War Memorial Museum.

== Biography ==
Furey completed her BA and MA at University of Auckland in anthropology (archaeology). In 2005 she was awarded a Doctor of Science by the university for her research in archaeological science (the first and only time that this qualification has been awarded to an archaeologist by the university).

== Research ==
Furey's research interests are around Māori material culture, and she is also interested in traditional Māori gardening and the sites and material culture of the first 200 years after Polynesians arrived in Aotearoa.

Furey has three current research projects. One focusses on early Māori ornaments held in museums and private collections in New Zealand. The second is Ahuahu Great Mercury Island Archaeology Project, a partnership between Auckland War Memorial Museum and University of Auckland. The last is a Royal Society Te Apārangi Marsden grant funded project "accurately dating the Māori past using marine shells".

== Selected publications ==
- Furey, Louise (2015). "Clay – a lesser known medium for Maori artefacts". Papahou: Records of the Auckland Museum. 50: 21–31. JSTOR 90014734. Wikidata Q104815055.
- Furey, Louise (2014). "Adzes with Notches". Papahou: Records of the Auckland Museum. 49: 5–13. JSTOR 43264617. Wikidata Q58629011.
- Furey, L. (2006). Māori gardening: An archaeological perspective. Department of Conservation.
- Furey, L., Sutton, D. & Marshall, Y. (2003). The Archaeology of Pouerua. Auckland University Press.
- Furey, L. (2002). Houhora. A Fourteenth Century Māori Village in Northland. Bulletin of the Auckland Museum, 19.
