= Tuapoka cavata =

Conservation status
- Not Threatened (NZ TCS)

Scientific classification
- Kingdom: Animalia
- Phylum: Arthropoda
- Subphylum: Chelicerata
- Class: Arachnida
- Order: Araneae
- Infraorder: Araneomorphae
- Family: Agelenidae
- Genus: Tuapoka
- Species: T. cavata

Binomial name
- Tuapoka cavata Forster & Wilton, 1973

Species of spider

Tuapoka cavata is a species of Agelenidae that is endemic to New Zealand.

== Taxonomy ==
This species was described in 1973 by Ray Forster and Cecil Wilton from female specimens.

== Description ==
The female is recorded at 1.81mm in length. The carapace is darkly shaded laterally. The legs are pale yellow. The abdomen is shaded black.

== Distribution ==
This species is only known from Stewart Island and Otago, New Zealand.

== Conservation status ==
Under the New Zealand Threat Classification System, this species is listed as "Not Threatened".
