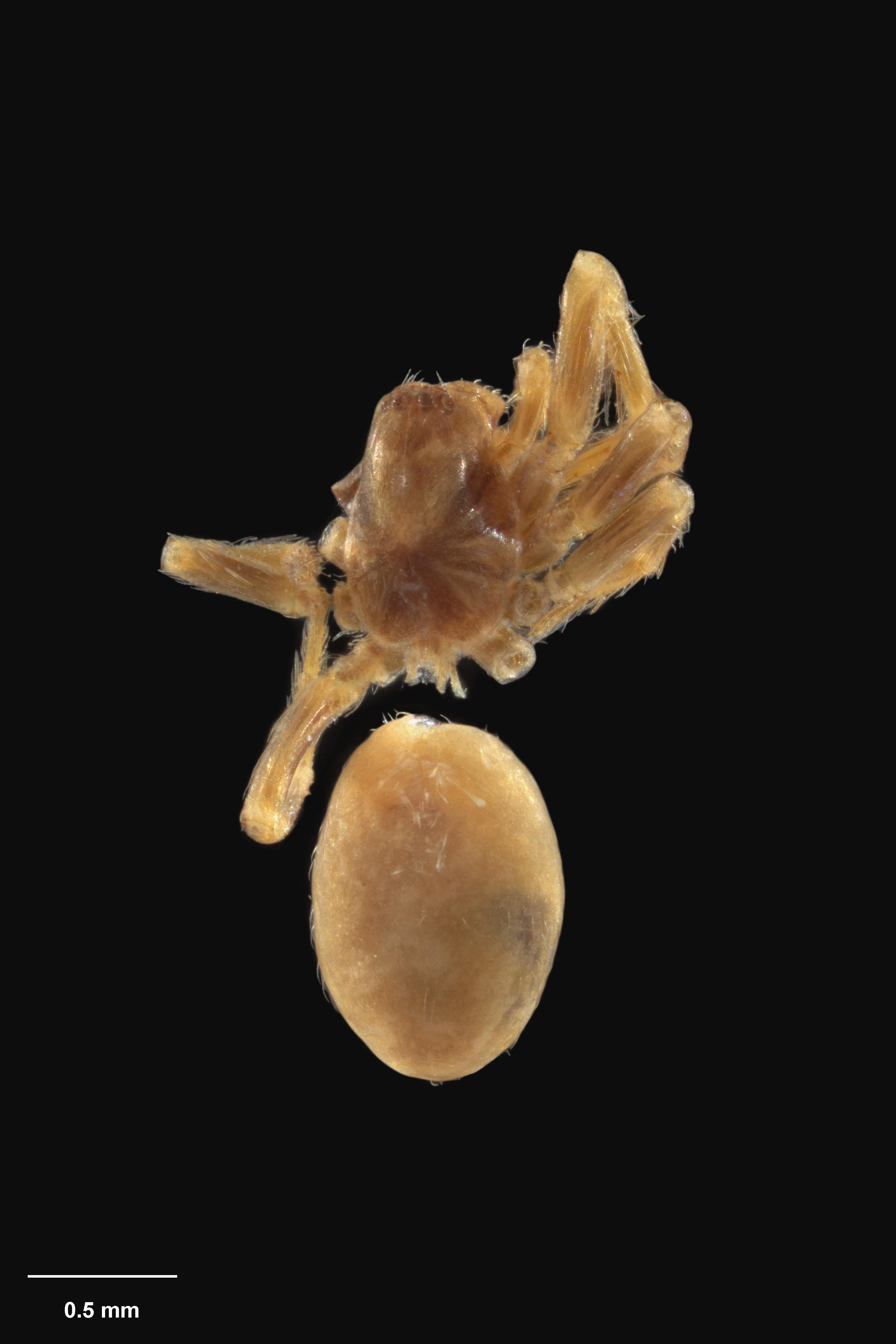
- Ahua insula

Scientific classification
- Kingdom: Animalia
- Phylum: Arthropoda
- Subphylum: Chelicerata
- Class: Arachnida
- Order: Araneae
- Infraorder: Araneomorphae
- Family: Agelenidae
- Genus: Ahua; Forster & Wilton, 1973

Type species
- A. vulgaris Forster & Wilton, 1973

Species
- 4, see text

= Ahua (spider) =

Genus of spiders

Ahua is a genus of South Pacific funnel weavers first described by Raymond Robert Forster & C. L. Wilton in 1973.

== Species ==
As of October 2026 it contains four species:

- Ahua dentata Forster & Wilton, 1973 — New Zealand
- Ahua insula Forster & Wilton, 1973 — New Zealand
- Ahua kaituna Forster & Wilton, 1973 — New Zealand
- Ahua vulgaris Forster & Wilton, 1973 — New Zealand
