= Rayforstia insula =

Conservation status
- Naturally Uncommon (NZ TCS)

Scientific classification
- Kingdom: Animalia
- Phylum: Arthropoda
- Subphylum: Chelicerata
- Class: Arachnida
- Order: Araneae
- Infraorder: Araneomorphae
- Family: Anapidae
- Genus: Rayforstia
- Species: R. insula

Binomial name
- Rayforstia insula (Forster, 1959)

Synonyms
- Textricella insula

Species of spider

Rayforstia insula is a species of Anapidae that is endemic to New Zealand.

== Taxonomy ==
This species was described as Textricella insula in 1959 by Ray Forster from male specimens collected on Solander Island. In 2010 it was transferred to Rayforstia. It is stored in Te Papa Museum.

== Description ==
The male is recorded at 1.21mm in length. This species has a dark golden brown carapace, yellow brown legs and dark golden brown abdomen.

== Distribution ==
This species is only known from Solander Island near Stewart Island, New Zealand.

== Conservation status ==
Under the New Zealand Threat Classification System, this species is listed as "Naturally Uncommon" with the qualifiers of "Island Endemic" and "One Location".
