= Rayforstia plebeia =

Conservation status
- Naturally Uncommon (NZ TCS)

Scientific classification
- Kingdom: Animalia
- Phylum: Arthropoda
- Subphylum: Chelicerata
- Class: Arachnida
- Order: Araneae
- Infraorder: Araneomorphae
- Family: Anapidae
- Genus: Rayforstia
- Species: R. plebeia

Binomial name
- Rayforstia plebeia (Forster, 1959)

Synonyms
- Textricella plebeia

Species of spider

Rayforstia plebeia is a species of Anapidae that is endemic to New Zealand.

== Taxonomy ==
This species was described as Textricella plebeia in 1959 by Ray Forster from female specimens. In 2010 it was transferred to Rayforstia. The holotype is stored in Te Papa Museum under registration number AS.000087.

== Description ==
The female is recorded at 1.14mm in length. The cephalothorax is coloured yellow brown whilst the legs are dull yellow.

== Distribution ==
This species is only known from Codfish Island, New Zealand.

== Conservation status ==
Under the New Zealand Threat Classification System, this species is listed as "Naturally Uncommon" with the qualifier of "One Location".
