= Rayforstia scuta =

Conservation status
- Not Threatened (NZ TCS)

Scientific classification
- Kingdom: Animalia
- Phylum: Arthropoda
- Subphylum: Chelicerata
- Class: Arachnida
- Order: Araneae
- Infraorder: Araneomorphae
- Family: Anapidae
- Genus: Rayforstia
- Species: R. scuta

Binomial name
- Rayforstia scuta (Forster, 1959)

Synonyms
- Textricella scuta

Species of spider

Rayforstia scuta is a species of Anapidae that is endemic to New Zealand.

== Taxonomy ==
This species was described as Textricella insula in 1959 by Ray Forster from male and female specimens. In 2010 it was transferred to Rayforstia. The holotype is stored in Te Papa Museum.

== Description ==
The male is recorded at 1.17mm in length whereas the female is 1.31mm. The carapace and legs are yellow brown.

== Distribution ==
This species is known throughout New Zealand.

== Conservation status ==
Under the New Zealand Threat Classification System, this species is listed as "Not Threatened".
