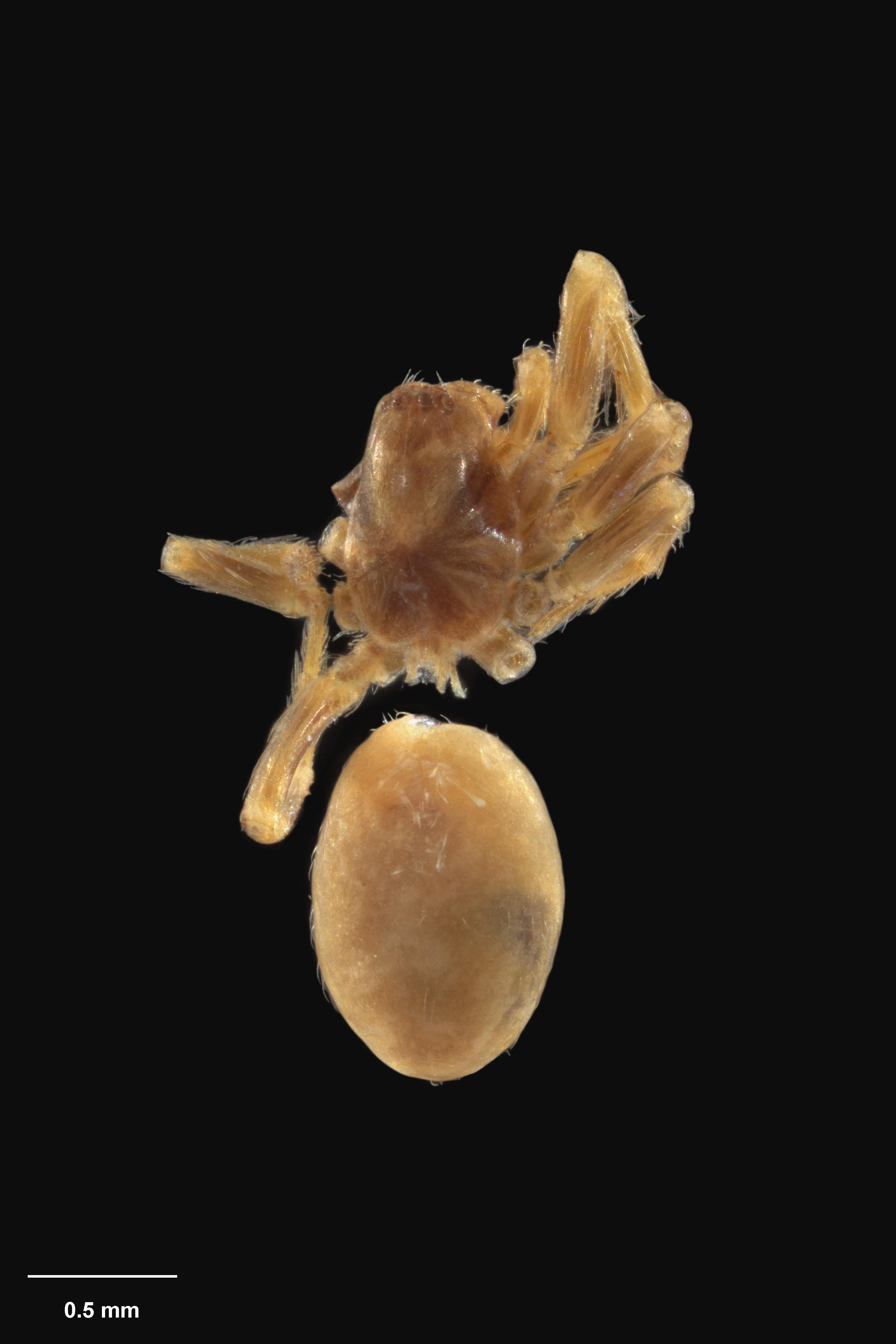

Conservation status
- Naturally Uncommon (NZ TCS)

Scientific classification
- Kingdom: Animalia
- Phylum: Arthropoda
- Subphylum: Chelicerata
- Class: Arachnida
- Order: Araneae
- Infraorder: Araneomorphae
- Family: Agelenidae
- Genus: Ahua
- Species: A. insula

Binomial name
- Ahua insula Forster & Wilton, 1973

= Ahua insula =

Species of spider

Ahua insula is a species of Agelenidae that is endemic to New Zealand.

== Taxonomy ==
This species was described in 1973 by Ray Forster and Cecil Wilton from female specimens. The holotype is stored in Te Papa Museum under registration number AS.000053.

== Description ==
The female is recorded at 1.62mm in length. The cephalothorax is coloured dark brown. The legs are paler than the cephalothorax. The abdomen has blackish shading which forms bands dorsally.

== Distribution ==
This species is only known from Stewart Island, New Zealand.

== Conservation status ==
Under the New Zealand Threat Classification System, this species is listed as "Naturally Uncommon" with the qualifiers of "Range Restricted".
