= Baden Powell (malacologist) =

New Zealand naturalist and paleontologist

Arthur William Baden Powell
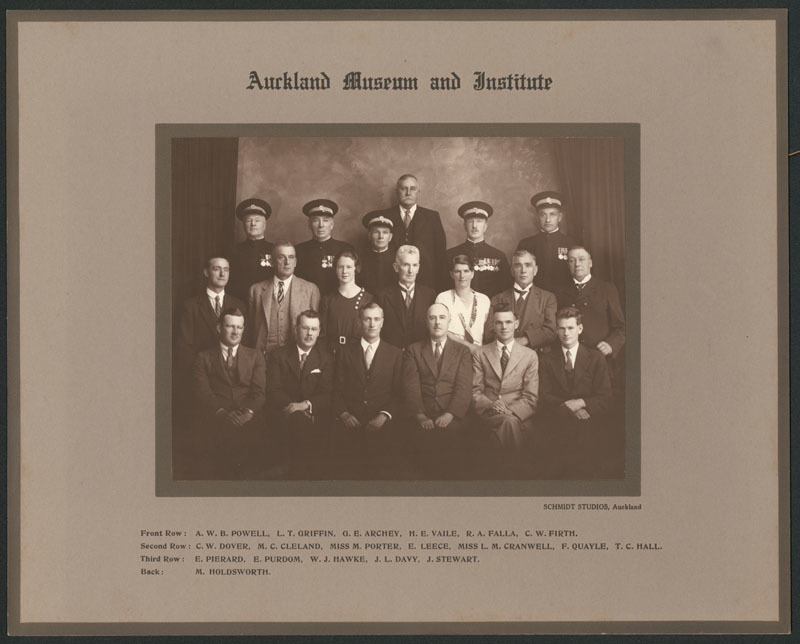
- Auckland Museum and Institute staff group portrait. front row: A.W.B. Powell
- Born: 4 April 1901; Wellington, New Zealand
- Died: 1 July 1987 (aged 86); Auckland, New Zealand
- Other names: A. W. B. Powell
- Occupations: Malacologist, naturalist, palaeontologist

Arthur William Baden Powell CBE (4 April 1901 – 1 July 1987) was a New Zealand malacologist, naturalist and palaeontologist, a major influence in the study and classification of New Zealand molluscs through much of the 20th century. He was known to his friends and family by his third name, "Baden".

== Biography ==
=== Early life ===
The name Baden had been a given name in a Powell family since 1731, when Susannah Powell née Thistlethwayte (1696–1762) gave to her child (1731–1792) the maiden name of her mother, Susannah Baden (1663–1692). The name Baden, particularly when associated with the surname Powell, became famous in 1900–1901, the year Arthur William Baden Powell was born, because of the siege of Mafeking, the most famous British action in the Second Boer War, which turned the British commander of the besieged, Robert Baden-Powell, into a national hero. Throughout the British Empire, babies were named after him. No family connection has yet been established between Arthur William Baden Powell and Robert Baden-Powell.

Powell was born at Wellington, New Zealand, on 4 April 1901, to driver Arthur Powell, and his wife, Minnie Sablofski. His schooling was in Auckland, and he trained in printing at the Elam School of Fine Arts. This training, and his interest in conchology, set him on his life's work.

=== Career ===
From 1916 until 1929, Powell was the honorary conchologist at the Auckland War Memorial Museum. Powell started writing scientific papers on mollusca in 1921, and became one of the few experts in New Zealand shellfish. From 1926 to 1938, Powell undertook comprehensive surveys of the Waitematā and Manukau harbours.

He was appointed to the Auckland War Memorial Museum as palaeontologist and conchologist in 1929, working on some lesser-known mollusc families. He also studied New Zealand's big land snails, the Paryphanta, and the Placostylus flax snails. In 1931, Powell founded the Auckland Shell Club, also known as the Conchology Section of the Auckland Museum Institute. From 1932 Powell participated in dredging expeditions on the British research ship Discovery II exploring coastal Northland and discovering large numbers of new species. Other field trips from the 1930s to 1960 took him to Stewart Island, the Chatham Islands, the Kermadec Islands and the Antarctica and Subantarctic region, resulting in many important papers.

In 1936, Powell was appointed as the assistant director of Auckland War Memorial Museum, a position he held until he retired in 1968. In 1947, Powell published the book Native Animals of New Zealand, a best-selling handbook of native fauna of the country. Powell was a fellow of the Royal Society of New Zealand from 1940 and was the recipient of the Hector Memorial Medal and Prize in 1947. He also received an honorary DSc in 1956 from the University of New Zealand and was appointed a Commander of the Order of the British Empire, for services to marine science, in the 1981 New Year Honours.

Powell died on 1 July 1987 in Auckland.

== Personal life ==
Powell married Isabel Essie Gittos on 19 December 1928, at Devonport in Auckland. They had a son. Gittos died in 1976. Two years later, he married Ida Madoline Worthy (née Hayes) at Whangārei.

== Namesake taxa ==
Taxa named after him include:

- Powelliphanta O'Connor, 1945
- Antimargarita powelli Aldea, Zelaya & Troncoso, 2009
- Falsilunatia powelli Dell, 1956
- Philine powelli Rudman, 1970
- Zeacolpus pagoda powelli Marwick, 1957

The World Register of Marine Species mentions 837 marine taxa, named by Powell. Many have become synonyms.

== Publications ==
Powell wrote over 100 scientific papers and three books. His 500-page New Zealand Mollusca, published in 1979, was a gigantic and important undertaking, the result of 50 years of single-handed work.

- Powell, A.W.B. 1924a: Description of a new subspecies of Alcithoe arabica Martyn, from New Zealand. Proceedings of the Malacological Society of London 16: 108–109.
- Powell, A.W.B. 1924b: Notes on New Zealand Mollusca. New Zealand Journal of Science and Technology 6: 282–286.
- Powell, A.W.B. 1924c: On a new species of Epitonium. Transactions of the New Zealand Institute 55: 138.
- Powell, A.W.B. 1926a: Descriptions of six new species and a new genus of gastropod Mollusca from northern New Zealand. Transactions of the New Zealand Institute 56: 591–596.
- Powell, A.W.B. 1926b: Description of two new gastropods from Whangaroa, New Zealand. Proceedings of the Malacological Society of London 17: 36–38.
- Powell, A.W.B. 1926c: Mollusca from 100 fathoms off Lyttelton, with descriptions of four new species and also a new Pliocene fossil. Records of the Canterbury Museum 3: 43–50.
- Powell, A.W.B. 1927a: The genetic relationships of Australasian rissoids. Part I: Descriptions of new Recent genera and species from New Zealand and the Kermadec Islands. Transactions of the New Zealand Institute 57: 534–548.
- Powell, A.W.B. 1927b: Variation in the molluscan genus Verconella with descriptions of new Recent species. Transactions of the New Zealand Institute 57: 549–558.
- Powell, A.W.B. 1927c: Deep-water Mollusca from south-west Otago with descriptions of 2 new genera and 22 new species. Records of the Canterbury Museum 3: 112–124.
- Powell, A.W.B. 1927d: Mollusca from twenty-three fathoms off Ahipara, N. Z. Transactions of the New Zealand Institute 58: 295–300.
- Powell, A.W.B. 1928a: Three new Recent volutes from New Zealand. Transactions of the New Zealand Institute 59: 361–364.
- Powell, A.W.B. 1928b: The Recent and Tertiary cassids of New Zealand and a study in hybridisation. Transactions of the New Zealand Institute 59: 629–642.
- Powell, A.W.B. 1929: The Recent and Tertiary species of Buccinulum in New Zealand with a review of related genera and families. Transactions of the New Zealand Institute 60: 57–98.
- Powell, A.W.B. 1930a: New species of New Zealand Mollusca from shallow-water dredgings. Transactions of the New Zealand Institute 60: 532–543.
- Powell, A.W.B. 1930b: New species of New Zealand Mollusca from shallow-water dredgings, Part 2. Transactions of the New Zealand Institute 61: 536–546.
- Powell, A. W. B. (1931). "Waitotaran Faunules of the Wanganui System and Descriptions of New Species of Mollusca from the New Zealand Pliocene". Records of the Auckland Institute and Museum. 1: 85–112. ISSN 0067-0464. JSTOR 42905938. Wikidata Q58676540.
- Powell, A.W.B. 1931b: Descriptions of some new species of Recent Mollusca, mainly from the sub-Antarctic islands of New Zealand. Records of the Canterbury Museum 3: 871–876.
- Powell, A.W.B. 1932a: On some New Zealand pelecypods. Proceedings of the Malacological Society of London 20: 65–72.
- Powell, A.W.B. 1932b: The Marginellidae of New Zealand, with descriptions of some new species. Transactions of the New Zealand Institute 62: 203–214.
- Powell, A.W.B. 1933a: Notes on the taxonomy of the Recent Cymatiidae and Naticidae of New Zealand. Transactions of the New Zealand Institute 63: 154–170.
- Powell, A.W.B. 1933b: On five new species of Recent New Zealand Mollusca. Proceedings of the Malacological Society of London 20: 194–198.
- Powell, A.W.B. 1933c: New species of marine Mollusca from the subantarctic islands of New Zealand. Proceedings of the Malacological Society of London 20: 232–236.
- Powell, A.W.B. 1933d: Marine Mollusca from the Bounty Islands. Records of the Canterbury Museum 4: 29–39.
- Powell, A. W. B. (1933). "The Marine Mollusca of the Chatham Islands". Records of the Auckland Institute and Museum. 1: 181–208. ISSN 0067-0464. JSTOR 42905950. Wikidata Q58676558.
- Powell, A. W. B. (1934). "Upper Pliocene Fossils from Cape Runaway". Records of the Auckland Institute and Museum. 1: 261–274. ISSN 0067-0464. JSTOR 42905956. Wikidata Q58676565.
- Powell, A.W.B. 1935a: New Recent and Tertiary Nuculanidae from New Zealand. Proceedings of the Malacological Society of London 21: 252–255.
- Powell, A. W. B. (1935). "Tertiary Mollusca from Motutara, West Coast, Auckland". Records of the Auckland Institute and Museum. 1: 327–340. ISSN 0067-0464. JSTOR 42905961. Wikidata Q58676576.
- Powell, A.W.B. 1937: Animal communities of the sea-bottom in Auckland and Manukau Harbours. Transactions of the Royal Society of New Zealand 66: 354–400.
- Powell, A.W.B. 1938a: Tertiary molluscan faunules from the Waitemata beds. Transactions of the Royal Society of New Zealand 68: 362–379.
- Powell, A. W. B. (1938). "A Pliocene Molluscan Faunule from Castle Point". Records of the Auckland Institute and Museum. 2: 157–164. ISSN 0067-0464. JSTOR 42905977. Wikidata Q58676603.
- Powell, A. W. B. (1939). "The Mollusca of Stewart Island". Records of the Auckland Institute and Museum. 2: 211–238. ISSN 0067-0464. JSTOR 42905983. Wikidata Q58676613.
- Powell, A.W.B. 1939b: Note on the importance of Recent animal ecology as a basis of paleoecology. Proceedings of the Sixth Pacific Science Congress: 607–610.
- Powell, A.W.B. 1940: The marine Mollusca of the Aupourian province, New Zealand. Transactions of the Royal Society of New Zealand 70: 205–248.
- Powell, A.W.B. 1942: The New Zealand Recent and fossil Mollusca of the family Turridae. Bulletin of the Auckland Institute and Museum 2: 188 p.
- Powell, A. W. B. (1946). "New Species of New Zealand Mollusca from the South Island, Stewart Island, and Chatham Islands". Records of the Auckland Institute and Museum. 3: 137–144. ISSN 0067-0464. JSTOR 42905999. Wikidata Q58676636.
- Powell, A. W. B. (1947). "Phytogeny of the Molluscan Genus Verconella, with Descriptions of New Recent and Tertiary Species". Records of the Auckland Institute and Museum. 3: 161–169. ISSN 0067-0464. JSTOR 42906004. Wikidata Q58676644.
- Powell, A. W. B. (1950). "Mollusca from the Continental Shelf, Eastern Otago". Records of the Auckland Institute and Museum. 4: 73–81. ISSN 0067-0464. JSTOR 42906044. Wikidata Q58676707.
- Powell, A. W. B. (1952). "New Zealand Molluscan Systematics, with Descriptions of New Species, Part 1". Records of the Auckland Institute and Museum. 4: 169–185. ISSN 0067-0464. JSTOR 42906061. Wikidata Q58676734.
- Powell, A. W. B. (1954). "New Zealand Molluscan Systematics, with Descriptions of New Species, Part 2". Records of the Auckland Institute and Museum. 4: 235–240. ISSN 0067-0464. JSTOR 42906069. Wikidata Q58676746.
- Powell, A.W.B. 1955: Mollusca of the southern islands of New Zealand. Dept. of Scientific and Industrial Research Cape Expedition Series Bulletin 15: 151 p.
- Powell, A.W.B. 1957: Mollusca of Kerguelen and Macquarie Islands. British, Australian and New Zealand Antarctic Research Expedition, Reports-Series B (Zoology and Botany) 6: 107–150.
- Powell, A. W. B. (1958). "Mollusca of the Kermadec Islands: Part I". Records of the Auckland Institute and Museum. 5: 65–85. ISSN 0067-0464. JSTOR 42906092. Wikidata Q58676766.
- Powell, A. W. B. (1958). "New Zealand Molluscan Systematics with Descriptions of New Species, Part 3". Records of the Auckland Institute and Museum. 5: 87–91. ISSN 0067-0464. JSTOR 42906093. Wikidata Q58676768.
- Powell, A.W.B. 1964: The family Turridae in the Indo-Pacific. Part 1. The subfamily Turrinae. Indo-Pacific Mollusca 1: 227–346.
- Powell, A. W. B. (1964). "New Zealand Molluscan Systematics with Descriptions of New Species: Part 4". Records of the Auckland Institute and Museum. 6: 11–20. ISSN 0067-0464. JSTOR 42906110. Wikidata Q58676792.
- Powell, A. W. B. (1965). "New Zealand Molluscan Systematics with Descriptions of New Species: Part 5". Records of the Auckland Institute and Museum. 6: 161–168. ISSN 0067-0464. JSTOR 42906118. Wikidata Q58676808.
- Powell, A.W.B. 1966: The molluscan families Speightiidae and Turridae. An evaluation of the valid taxa, both Recent and fossil, with lists of characteristic species. Bulletin of the Auckland Institute and Museum 5: 184 p.
- Powell, A.W.B. 1967a: The family Turridae in the Indo-Pacific. Part la. The subfamily Turrinae concluded. Indo-Pacific Mollusca 1: 409–432.
- Powell, A. W. B. (1967). "New Zealand Molluscan Systematics with Descriptions of New Species; Part 6". Records of the Auckland Institute and Museum. 6: 185–196. ISSN 0067-0464. JSTOR 42906123. Wikidata Q58676815.
- Powell, A. W. B. (1967). "Mollusca of the Kermadec Islands: Part 2". Records of the Auckland Institute and Museum. 6: 197–199. ISSN 0067-0464. JSTOR 42906124. Wikidata Q58676818.
- Powell, A.W.B. 1969: The family Turridae in the Indo-Pacific. Part 2. The subfamily Turriculinae. Indo-Pacific Mollusca 2: 207–416.
- Powell, A. W. B. (1971). "New Zealand Molluscan Systematics with Descriptions of New Species: Part 7". Records of the Auckland Institute and Museum. 8: 209–228. ISSN 0067-0464. JSTOR 42906169. Wikidata Q58676898.
- Powell, A.W.B. 1973: The patellid limpets of the world (Patellidae). Indo-Pacific Mollusca 3: 75–206.
- Powell, A. W. B. (1974). "New Zealand Molluscan Systematics with Descriptions of New Species: Part 8". Records of the Auckland Institute and Museum. 11: 197–207. ISSN 0067-0464. JSTOR 42906214. Wikidata Q58676988.
- Powell, A.W.B. 1979: New Zealand Mollusca. Marine, land and freshwater shells. Auckland, Collins, xiv + 500 p.
- Powell, A.W.B.; Bartrum, J.A. 1929: The Tertiary (Waitematan) molluscan fauna of Oneroa, Waiheke Island. Transactions of the Royal Society of New Zealand 60: 395–447.

== Bibliography ==
- The shellfish of New Zealand, Unity Press, 1937
- Native animals of New Zealand, Unity Press, 1947
- New Zealand Mollusca, William Collins Publishers Ltd, Auckland, New Zealand 1979 ISBN 0-00-216906-1
