= Roger Duff =

New Zealand ethnologist and museum director (1912–1978)

- Born: 11 July 1912; Invercargill, New Zealand
- Died: 30 October 1978 (aged 66); Christchurch, New Zealand
- Occupations: Ethnologist; museum director
- Known for: Māori studies

Roger Shepherd Duff CBE FRSNZ (11 July 1912 – 30 October 1978) was a New Zealand ethnologist and museum director.

== Biography ==
Duff was born in Invercargill, New Zealand, on 11 July 1912. He was the son of Oliver Duff, the founding editor of the New Zealand Listener. He started work at Canterbury Museum in 1938 and became its director ten years later. Duff excavated skeletons of moa, an extinct flightless bird, at Pyramid Valley in north Canterbury and at the Wairau Bar in Marlborough.

Duff brought proof through his scientific papers of the existence of moa-hunters as an early and distinct form of Māori culture. He developed and defended one of three major theories as to the origins of the Polynesian people: he believed, on the basis mainly on the physical differences, that the ancestors of the Polynesians could not have come from Asia via the Melanesian island. His main idea was that they had moved south from the area around Taiwan, through the Micronesian islands (mainly coral atolls) to Fiji, Tonga and Samoa. From here they radiated out into the Pacific through Tahiti and the Society Islands: north and east to Hawaii; east and south to reach the Marquesas and Easter Island, and south and to the West to New Zealand.

He was highly critical of the hypothesis of American origins promoted by Thor Heyerdahl which was popularised by the voyage of the Kon Tiki. Over the years with accumulation of evidence (both pro and contrary) these three theories have all been modified to various degrees, but no one hypothesis has ever found universal acceptance (see Māori people).

Especially for his work on the Wairau Bar, Duff received many honours and awards, including the Percy Smith Medal (1948), a Doctor of Science from the University of New Zealand (1951), election to fellowship of the Royal Society of New Zealand (1952), and the Hector Memorial Medal (1956). In 1953, Duff was awarded the Queen Elizabeth II Coronation Medal. In the 1977 Queen's Silver Jubilee and Birthday Honours, he was appointed a Commander of the Order of the British Empire, for services as director of the Canterbury Museum since 1948.

In the 1960s he helped raise his nephew, writer Alan Duff.

In 1969 Duff participated in the Cook Bicentenary Expedition undertaking archaeological research.

Duff suffered a stroke at the Canterbury Museum on 30 October 1978 and died. His coffin was laid in state at the museum prior to his funeral service at Christchurch Cathedral. His remains were cremated.
