= Papahou: Records of the Auckland Museum =

Academic journal of Auckland War Memorial Museum

- Language: English

Publication details
- Former names: Records of the Auckland Institute and Museum; Records of the Auckland Museum
- History: 1930–present
- Publisher: Auckland War Memorial Museum (New Zealand)
- Frequency: Yearly
- Open access: yes
- License: CC BY 4.0

Standard abbreviations
- ISO 4: Papahou: Rec. Auckl. Mus.

Indexing
- ISSN: 1174-9202 (print); 3021-3576 (web)
- LCCN: 00252520
- JSTOR: recoauckmuse
- OCLC no.: 1524193944

Links
- Journal homepage; Online archive (2015–2023); Online archive (1930–2004)

Papahou: Records of the Auckland Museum is a multidisciplinary peer-reviewed open-access scientific journal published by the Auckland War Memorial Museum. Established as the Records of the Auckland Institute and Museum in 1930, the publication has traditionally documented research by Auckland War Memorial Museum staff or academics working with the collections of the museum, and focuses on New Zealand and the wider Pacific region. Over 630 species descriptions have been published, including Pycroft's petrel and the Okarito kiwi.

== History ==
The first iteration of the journal, the Records of the Auckland Institute and Museum, was published in June 1930, during the tenure of museum director Gilbert Archey. The publication was envisioned as a means of publishing research by museum staff, and research focusing on the Auckland War Memorial Museum collections. The journal's establishment was also motivated by a desire to exchange journals with other domestic and international research institutions. Prior to the journal's establishment, museum staff and members of the Auckland Institute were expected to publish research findings in the Transactions of the New Zealand Institute.

Between 1930 and 1997, 630 taxa were described by the Records, of which 70% were gastropods. This number includes 535 species that were new to science. The journal includes the first scientific description of Pycroft's petrel, documenting the 1932 visit to the Hen and Chicken Islands by Arthur Pycroft and Robert Falla. The 1948 volume documented research expeditions to Manawatāwhi / Three Kings Islands, including efforts to eradicate goats from the island group, and included the type description on the Three Kings vine, Tecomanthe speciosa. The extent of content generated from the research expeditions led to the 1948 publication being released as a double issue.

In 1998, the journal rebranded as the Records of the Auckland Museum, due to government legislation, the Auckland War Memorial Museum Act 1996, separating the Auckland Institute from the Auckland War Memorial Museum into two distinct organisations. The 1997 volume, the final volume published as the Records of the Auckland Institute and Museum, was a special index volume that documented the content and subjects of the journal. The 2003 volume included the type description for the Okarito kiwi, the first new living taxon of kiwi described since the Stewart Island kiwi (Apteryx australis subsp. lawryi) in 1893.

In 2024, rebranded as Papahou: Records of the Auckland Museum, a name referencing a traditional Māori treasure box. From 2024, the publication moved from a hybrid print and digital format to a digitally exclusive format.

== Scope and regularity ==
Between 1935 and 2008, three-quarters of publications in the journal focused on biology, with over 25% focusing on archaeology and ethnography. Other papers in this time period focus on geology, applied arts, social history and bibliography. Over time, papers documenting the history of the museum itself, and its collections, have begun to be incorporated. The first papers to be published outside the scope of archaeology, botany, ethnology and zoology were works by musicologist Angela Annabell, publishing research on pianofortes held in applied arts department collections, the first of which was published in 1983. As a part of the 2024 rebrand, the publication aims to publish a broader range of research than had been seen in past years, reflecting a wider range of museum-related research than in previous years. The publication remains focused on research relating to New Zealand and the Pacific region.

While the records were aimed to be published annually, six years were missed in the mid-20th century. The year 2000 volume was skipped in favour of a joint issue in 2001 (volumes 37/38), and no volumes were published in the years 2011, 2013 and 2021.

== Editors ==
The first editor of the Records for the period between 1930 and 1947 is unknown, but it is presumed to be Gilbert Archey, then museum director. Malacologist A. W. B. Powell was the editor for the records between 1948 and 1967, after which museum botanist R. C. Cooper became editor for the 1969 volume, assisted by K. A. J. Wise. Wise was the editor in charge of publication between 1970 and 1990, and in 1972, an editorial committee was formed to assist Wise publishing the Records and Bulletin due to the complexity of the task. From 1991 to 2008, ornithologist Brian Gill and archaeologist Nigel Prickett were co-editors of the publication.

From 2009 to 2017, the records were edited by entomologist John W. Early and Pacific collections curator Fuli Pereira. From 2018 to 2022, Early was joined by archaeologist Louise Furey, and in 2023 by museum professional Jami Williams. When the records rebranded as Papahou: Records of the Auckland Museum in 2024, the position of editor was replaced by an editorial team.

== Indexing and abstracting ==
The journal is indexed and abstracted at JSTOR. From 2024, the journal has been hosted digitally on the ARPHA platform. Archives of the Records are hosted by the Biodiversity Heritage Library between the years 1930–2004, and the Auckland War Memorial Museum website hosts volumes issued between 2015 and 2023.

== Bulletin of the Auckland Museum ==
Bulletin of the Auckland Museum
- Language: English

Publication details
- Former names: Bulletin of the Auckland Institute and Museum
- History: 1941–present
- Frequency: Irregular

Standard abbreviations
- ISO 4: Bull. Auckl. Mus.

Indexing
- ISSN: 0067-0456
- OCLC no.: 46482467

Links
- Journal homepage

The Bulletin of the Auckland Museum is a companion publication to Papahou: Records of the Auckland Museum, which publishes longer monographs at irregular intervals, beginning with The Moa: a Study of the Dinornithiformes by Gilbert Archey in 1941. Originally known as the Bulletin of the Auckland Institute and Museum, the publication changed its name in the year 2000 to the Bulletin of the Auckland Museum to reflect the name change of the institution.

Bulletin publications have focused on topics including pollen studies, Pacific Island art forms, archaeology, taxonomy, Māori material artifacts and manuscripts and manuscripts of women in the collections of Auckland War Memorial Museum. Baden Powell's The molluscan families Speightiidae and Turridae: an evaluation of the valid taxa, both recent and fossil, with lists of characteristic species (1966) included a description of a new mollusc genus, Toxiclionella. W. O. Cernohorsky's Systematics of the families Mitridae and Volutomitridae (Mollusca: Gastropoda) (1970) included type descriptions of two new mollusc genera (Dibaphimitra and Domiporta) and three new species, Austromitra lacertosa, Domiporta gloriola and Tosapusia kalimnanensis, and his 1984 work Systematics of the family Nassariidae (Mollusca: Gastropoda) described two new mollusc species, Nassarius maccauslandi and Nassarius whiteheadae.

The 2015 volume documented the 2011 biodiscovery expedition to the Kermadec Islands, the 2020 volume focused on perspectives on World War I, and the 2025 volume on cataloguing the molluscan type specimens in the collections of the museum.

== Bibliography ==
- Thwaites, Ian (2015). A Good Place to Be: Auckland Museum People 1929–89. Ian Thwaites. ISBN 978-0-473-32932-7. OCLC 927167353. Wikidata Q64995662.
