= Canterbury Museum, Christchurch =

Museum in Christchurch, New Zealand

Coordinates: 43°31′51″S 172°37′38″E

Canterbury Museum
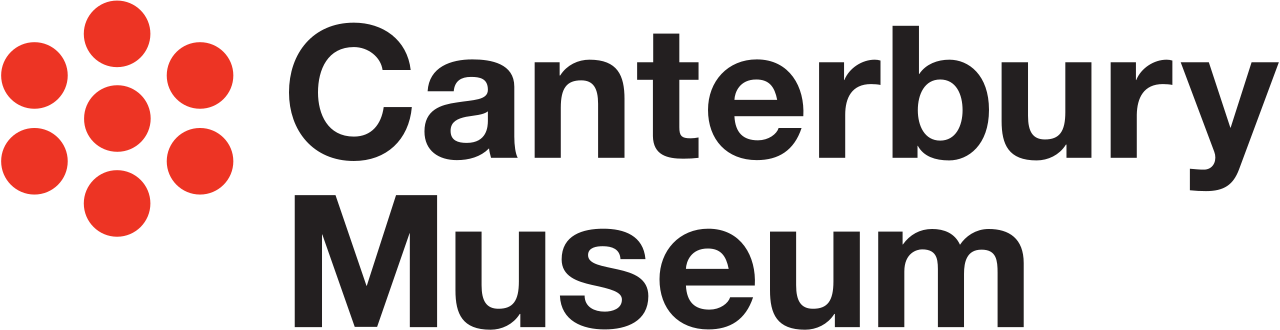

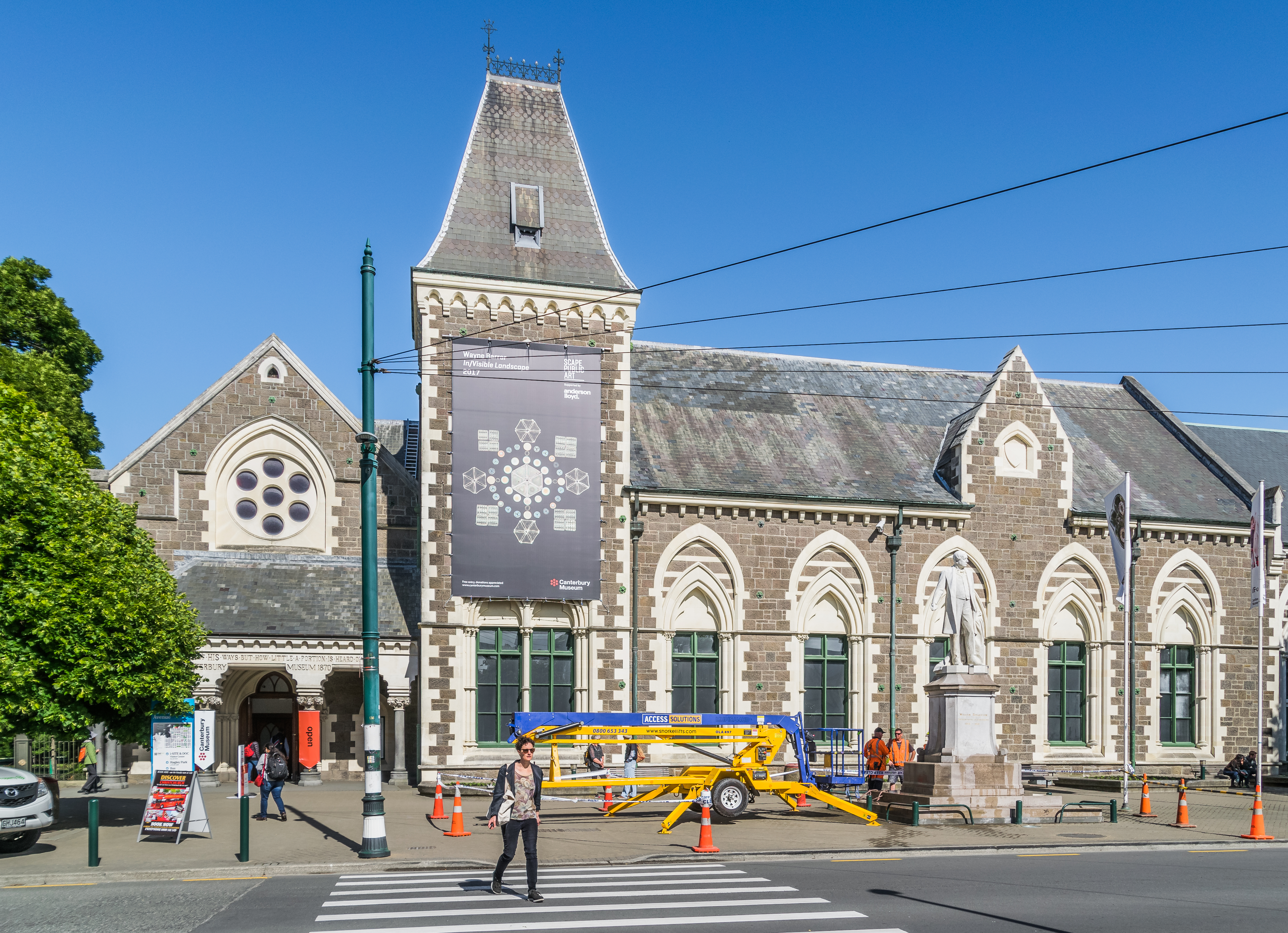
- Canterbury Museum in 2017
- Interactive map of the Canterbury Museum area

General information
- Type: Museum
- Architectural style: Gothic Revival
- Location: Christchurch, New Zealand, 11 Rolleston Avenue
- Completed: 1882
- Inaugurated: 1870 (first part of building)
- Renovated: 1995

Design and construction
- Architect: Benjamin Mountfort

Website
- canterburymuseum.com

Heritage New Zealand – Category 1
- Designated: 25 September 1986
- Reference no.: 290

The Canterbury Museum is a museum located in the central city of Christchurch, New Zealand, in the city's Cultural Precinct. The museum was established in 1867 with Julius von Haast – whose collection formed its core – as its first director. The building is registered as a "Historic Place – Category I" by Heritage New Zealand.

== History ==
Construction

The building, a Gothic Revival constructed on a design by Benjamin Mountfort, opened in 1870. Two years after its opening, the single-storey building was expanded with an additional floor in the Victorian Gothic style. The museum continued to grow over the next decade, with an addition built on in 1876 and an interior courtyard roofed in 1882.

In 1958, a new wing was added adjacent to Christ's College, and another was built on in 1977. The building was strengthened in the mid-1990s and a four-storey block was added in 1995.

Earthquake impact

The museum sustained minor damage to its façade during the February 2011 Christchurch earthquake, but remains structurally sound. This can perhaps be attributed to the progressive strengthening and renovating of the buildings to earthquake standards between 1987 and 1995. An estimated 95% of the collections were unharmed. The statue of William Rolleston, located at the front of the museum, toppled off its plinth during the quake. The museum reopened on 2 September 2011.

Redevelopment and controversy

The museum received complaints in June 2020 because of their exhibit depicting a Māori family before colonialism, the dioramas were covered up and later removed in 2022.

In late 2020, the first concept art designs were revealed and the project was given an estimated cost of $195 million. The redevelopment will bring back the blue whale skeleton onto display (thought to be the largest skeleton in the world) and the Whare Whakairo "Hau Te Ananui O Tangaroa" and also renovate spaces such as Discovery (children's zone), Christchurch Street (model of a Christchurch street in the 1800s) and Fred & Myrtle's Paua Shell House.

The budget of the project was increased in 2022 by 5% rising from $195 million to $205 million. However, a government grant will put $25 million towards the project.

The museum started moving its collection of 2.3 million items (less than 1% was on display at the time) from the museum to a dedicated storage facility in mid October and people were invited to "say goodbye" to the galleries before they were packed away for five years.

In January 2023, it was announced that during the redevelopment the museum would relocate to the CoCA (Centre of Contemporary Art) building, with half of the space being used for temporary exhibitions and the other half for the museums most loved pieces. The pop up opened in mid-2023.

On 28 January 2023, The Shift: Urban Art Takeover was opened to the public after the museum finished moving its collection over 60 artists from around New Zealand had created artwork around 5 floors and 35 rooms inside the museum in areas that were previously open to the public and previously not open to the public. The exhibition closed on 11 April.

The redevelopment will introduce a large atrium into the museum which will expose the walls of the original buildings, the museums blue whale skeleton will also be on display in the space hanging from the ceiling. Part of the Roger Duff wings exterior will be removed to create a large glass window spanning across two floors. A second entrance will be added on the Rolleston Avenue side of the building along with the return of the museums original flèche. The buildings will also be seismically strengthened. Along with the redevelopment of the museum itself the Robert McDougall Art Gallery will become an integrated part of the museum displaying the museums art collection.

== Directors ==
The title curator and director has been used interchangeably during the history of Canterbury Museum. Von Haast was the museum's inaugural director; Haast died in 1887. Following Haast's death, Frederick Hutton was acting director until Henry Ogg Forbes took on a permanent position in December 1888 upon his return from England. In August 1892, Forbes permanently moved to England, and Hutton was appointed full director from May 1892 until October 1905. Hutton applied for leave to travel to England, and Charles Chilton was acting director from March 1905; Hutton died on his return journey from England and Chilton retained his acting role until April 1906, when Edgar Ravenswood Waite received a permanent appointment. Waite was director for eight years until March 1914, when he took the equivalent role at the South Australian Museum.

Robert Speight, who had already been acting director in 1911, was appointed as Waite's successor in March 1914. Speight retired from this role in November 1935. Speight was succeeded by two acting directors who worked alongside one another; the geologist Robin Allan, and the zoologist Edgar Percival. They were succeeded by Robert Falla, who commenced his role on 1 March 1937 and who was director until 1947, when he accepted the same position at the Dominion Museum in Wellington. Walter Reginald Brock Oliver was acting director from November 1947 to September 1948. Roger Duff, who had been acting director on several occasions during Falla's tenure prior to Oliver, succeeded Falla as director from September 1948 until his sudden death on 30 October 1978. John Crum Wilson succeeded Duff as acting director from October 1978 to February 1979, and then as full director until February 1983. The archaeologist Michael Trotter succeeded him as director from March 1983 to December 1995. Stephen Phillips had an interim position from January to March 1996 until the current director, Anthony Wright, was appointed in March 1996.

== Exhibitions ==
Quake City is an exhibition showing information about the 2010–2011 earthquakes. It was opened in February 2013, originally in Cashel Mall, and was moved to the corner of Durham Street and Armagh Street in 2017.

== Gallery ==
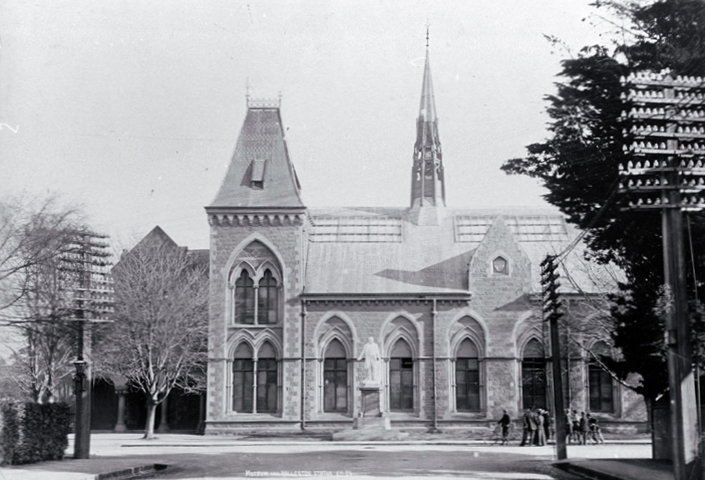
The building was designed by Benjamin Mountfort and completed in 1882.

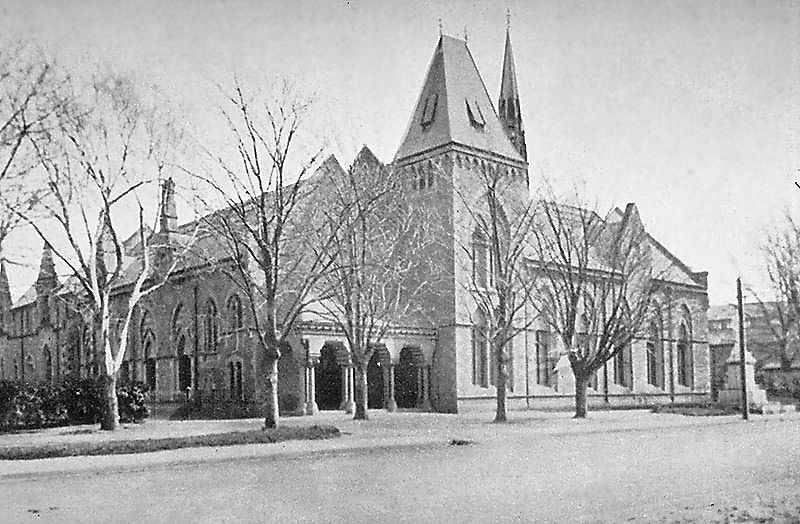
Historic oblique view of the building.

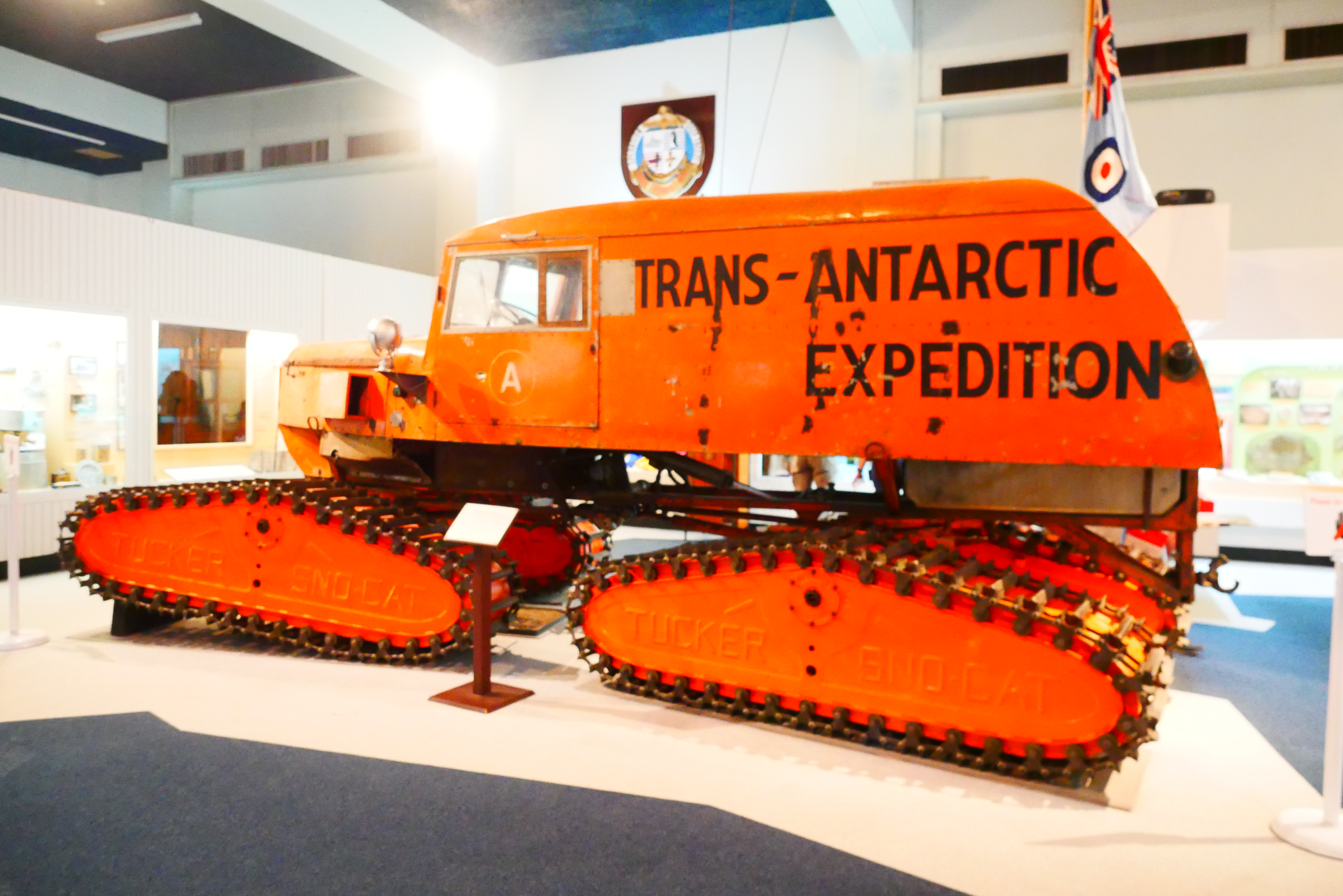
The sno-cat tractor, Commonwealth Trans Antarctic Expedition (1955–1958)

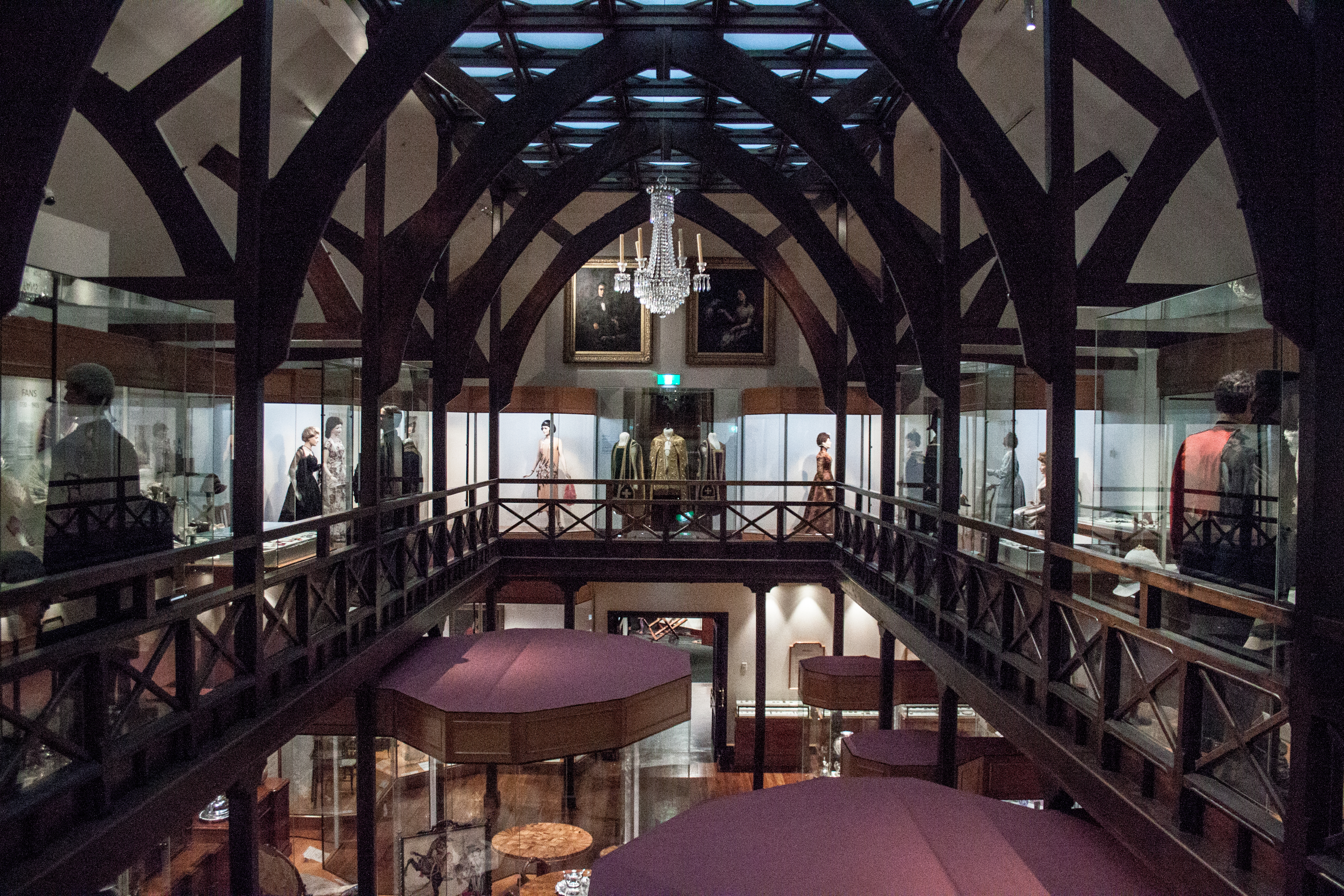
Clothing collection, 2016

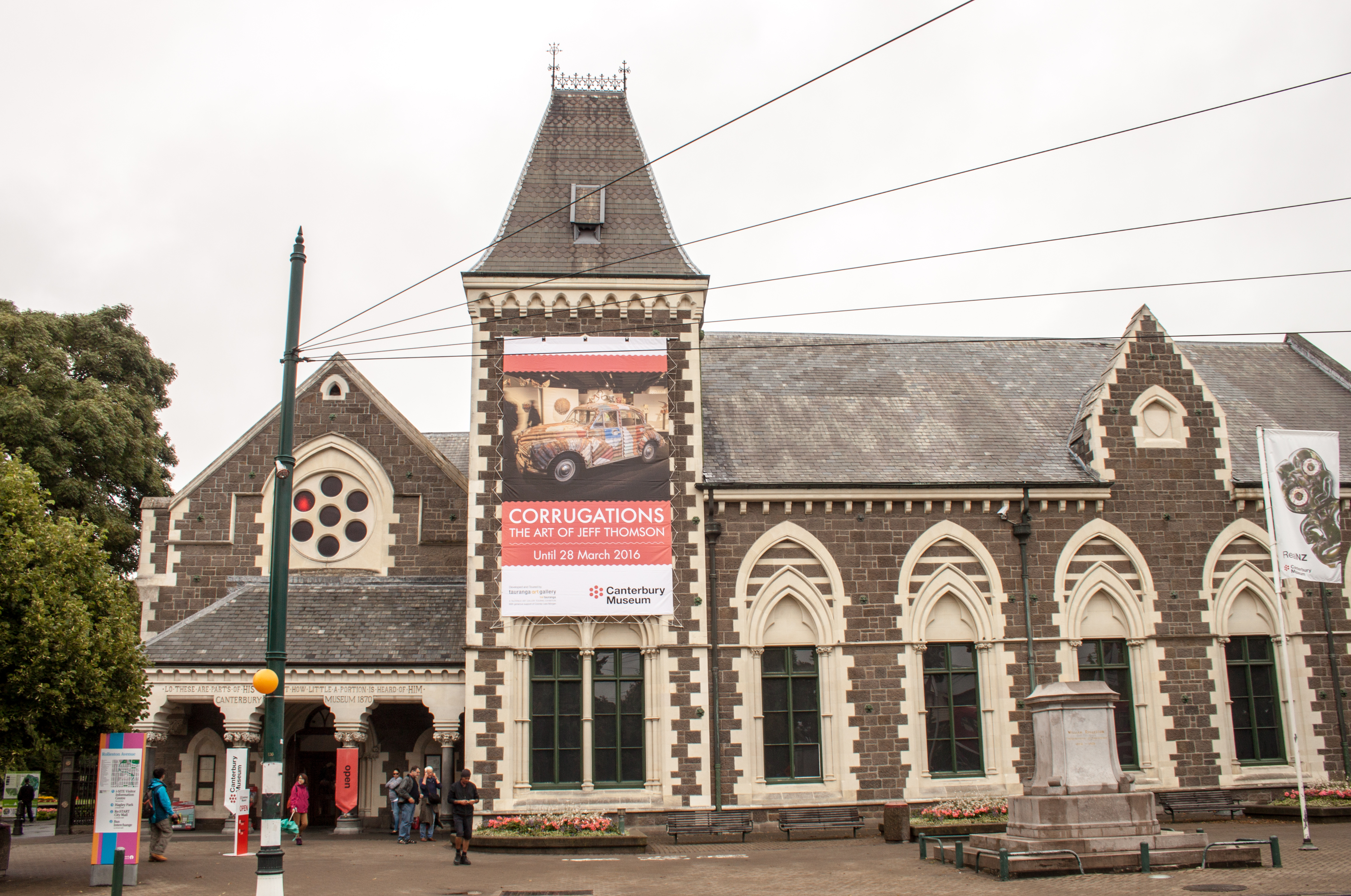
Museum entrance

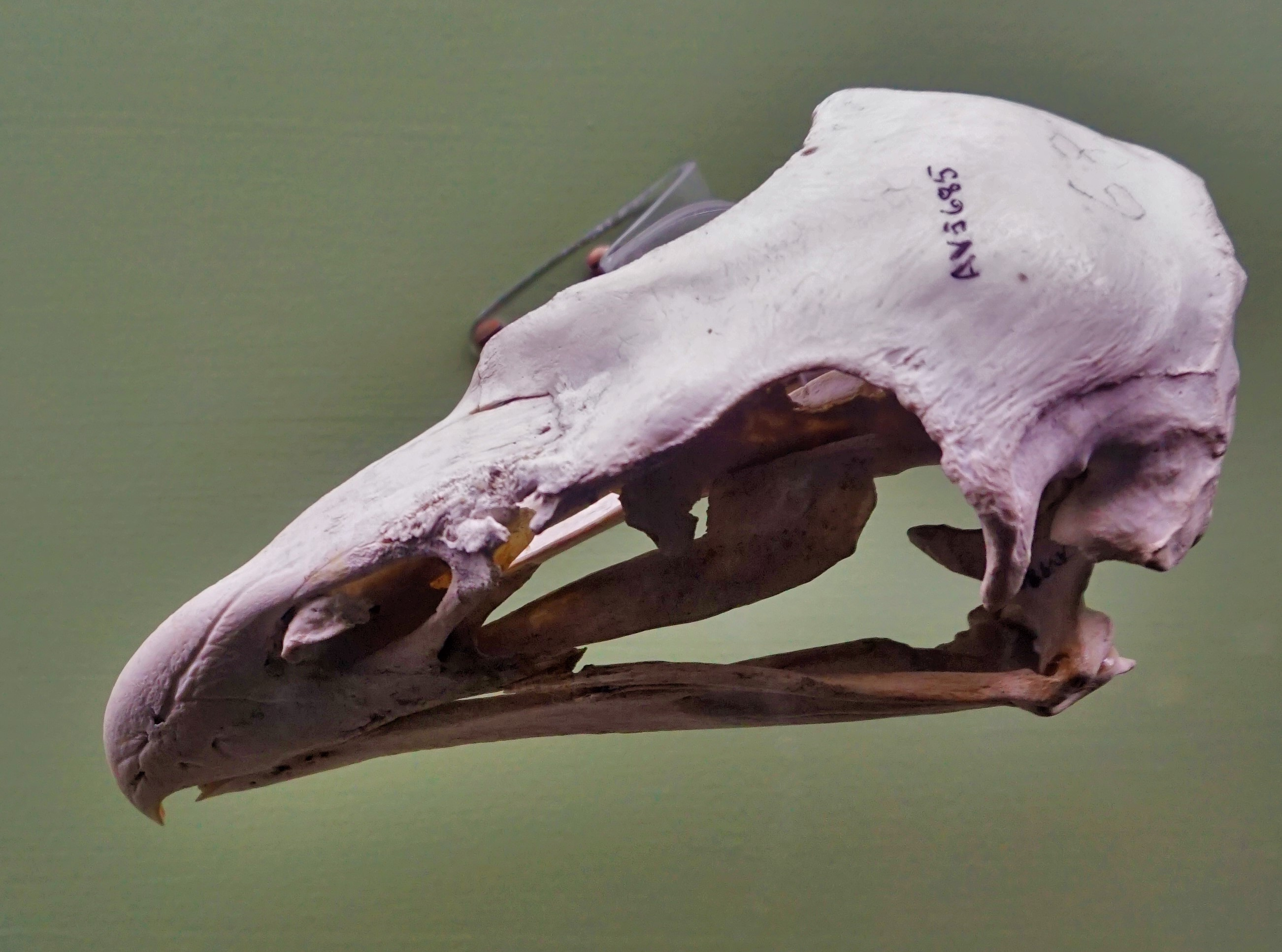
The skull of a Haast's eagle

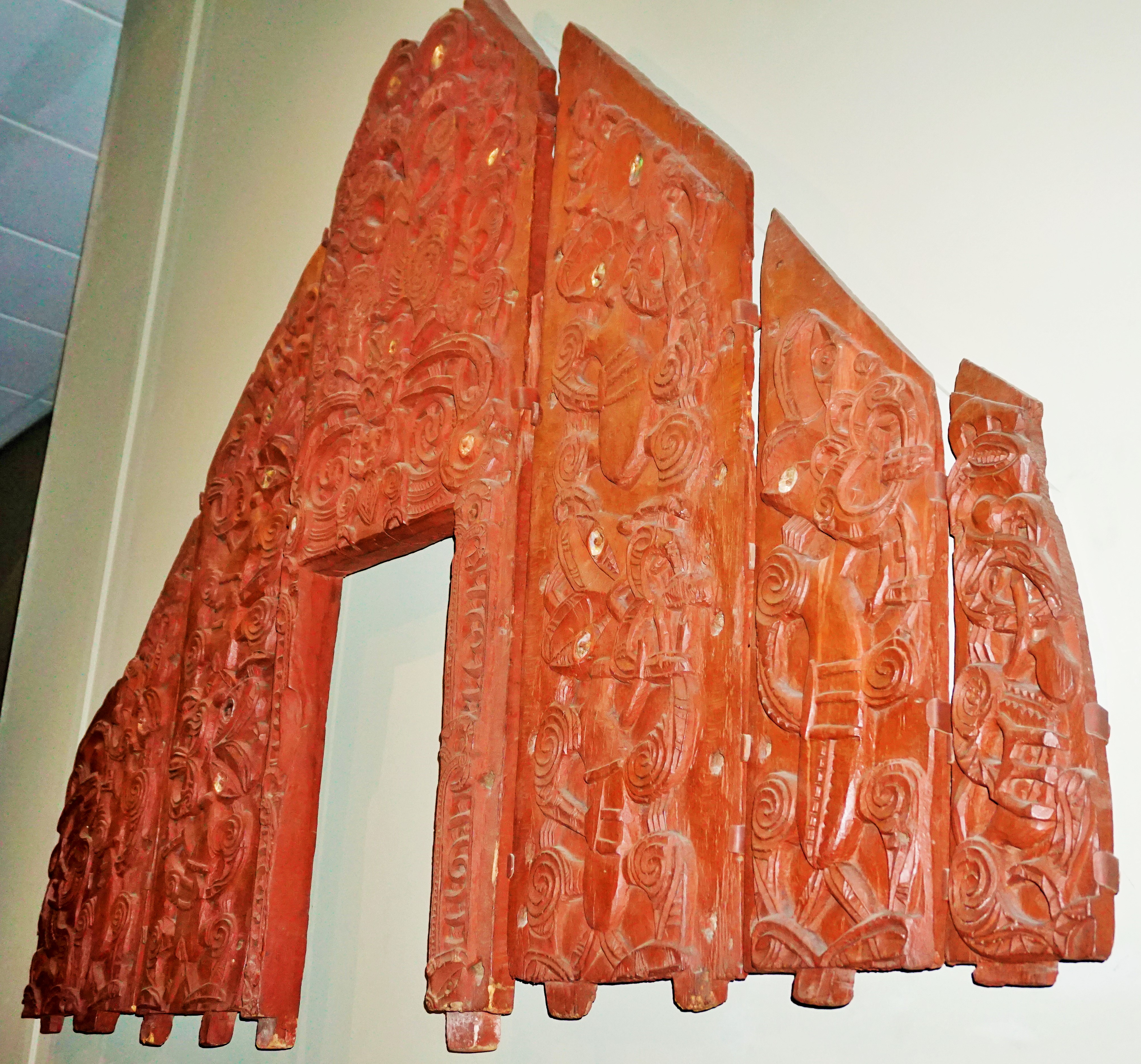
A pātaka

== See also ==
- Canterbury Spur, a flat-topped ridge leading north from the north face of Mount Glossopteris named after the museum.
