= (Z)-6-Dodecen-4-olide =

- Skeletal structure of (Z)-6-dodecen-4-olide

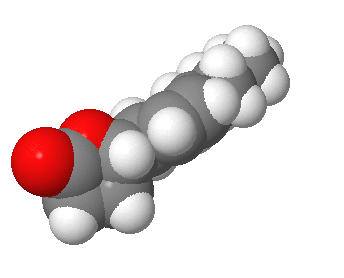
- Space-filling model of (Z)-6-dodecen-4-olide

Names
- Preferred IUPAC name 5-[(2Z)-Oct-2-en-1-yl]oxolan-2-one
- Other names Cis-6-Dodecen-4-olide 2(3H)-furanone dihydro-5-(2-octenyl) (6Z)-4-hydroxy-6-dodecenoic acid lactone

Identifiers
CAS Number	18679-18-0
3D model (JSmol)	Interactive image
ChemSpider	4509320
ECHA InfoCard	100.038.619
EC Number	242-497-9
PubChem CID	5352428
UNII	O8B631XC2S
CompTox Dashboard (EPA)	DTXSID601016535
- InChI: InChI=1S/C12H20O2/c1-2-3-4-5-6-7-8-11-9-10-12(13)14-11/h6-7,11H,2-5,8-10H2,1H3/b7-6- Key: QFXOXDSHNXAFEY-SREVYHEPSA-N; InChI=1/C18H37NO2 Key: WWUZIQQURGPMPG-KRWOKUGFBW
- SMILES: CCCCC/C=C\CC1CCC(=O)O1

Properties
Chemical formula	C_{12}H_{20}O_{2}
Molar mass	196.286
Odor	Cheesy, soapy, fatty with a fruity nuance
Density	1.0±0.1 g/cm^{3}
Melting point	estimated 17.6 °C
Boiling point	estimated 311.2±11.0 °C
Solubility in water	estimated 15.6 - 64.9 mg/L
Vapor pressure	0.0±0.7 mmHg

Hazards
Flash point	127.5±16.7 °C
- Except where otherwise noted, data are given for materials in their standard state (at 25 °C [77 °F], 100 kPa). Infobox references

(Z)-6-Dodecen-4-olide is a volatile, unsaturated lipid and γ-lactone found in dairy products, and secreted as a pheromone by some even-toed ungulates. It has a creamy, cheesy, fatty flavour with slight floral undertones in small concentrations, but contributes towards the strong, musky smell of a few species of antelope and deer in higher concentrations.

== Function ==
(Z)-6-Dodecen-4-olide is believed to play a part in olfactory communication between individuals of the Columbian black-tailed deer (Odocoileus hemionus columbianus), and is secreted into urine during a rut. (Z)-6-Dodecen-4-olide is then deposited onto the tuft of hair making up the tarsal gland of the deer, as the urine runs down the gland, during a behavior called rub-urination. Similarly, it has also been identified in secretions of the interdigital and pedal glands of the bontebok (Damaliscus pygargus) and the blesbok (Damaliscus pygargus phillipsi) where it is believed to play a role in carrying information about the dominance status, sex, health condition and possibly other characteristics of the animal it came from. The (Z)-6-dodecen-4-olide is replenished daily to maintain the pungent smell. It has also been isolated from Polianthes tuberosa, a perennial plant used in the perfume industry since the 17th century for its powerful floral scent.
