= Heradida speculigera =

Scientific classification
- Kingdom: Animalia
- Phylum: Arthropoda
- Subphylum: Chelicerata
- Class: Arachnida
- Order: Araneae
- Infraorder: Araneomorphae
- Family: Zodariidae
- Genus: Heradida
- Species: H. speculigera

Binomial name
- Heradida speculigera Jocqué, 1987

Species of spider

Heradida speculigera is a species of spider in the family Zodariidae. It is endemic to the Western Cape province of South Africa.

== Distribution ==
Heradida speculigera is found exclusively in the Western Cape province of South Africa. It has been recorded from multiple localities including Bontebok National Park, Table Mountain National Park, Kirstenbosch National Botanical Garden, Kogelberg Biosphere Reserve, and extensively throughout the Cederberg Wilderness Area.

== Habitat ==
The species primarily inhabits the Fynbos biome at altitudes ranging from 9 to 1850 m above sea level. It is a ground-dwelling species typically found running on soil surfaces and has been extensively sampled using pitfall traps during long-term surveys in the Cederberg region.

== Description ==
Heradida speculigera is known only from females. Females have a total length of 2 mm. The carapace is dark brown with darker striae. Legs are yellow. The opisthosoma features a dark sepia dorsal scutum, with pale sides and venter that becomes brownish between the sclerotized areas in front of the spinnerets.

== Conservation ==
The species is listed as Data Deficient. Although it was abundant in the Cederberg Wilderness Area where originally described, it is known only from females from a relatively small area. It receives protection in several reserves including Bontebok National Park, Kirstenbosch National Botanical Garden, and Table Mountain National Park. More sampling is needed to collect male specimens and determine the species' full range.
