= Zelotes caldarius =

Montagu Dark Ground Spider

Conservation status
- Least Concern (SANBI Red List)

Scientific classification
- Kingdom: Animalia
- Phylum: Arthropoda
- Subphylum: Chelicerata
- Class: Arachnida
- Order: Araneae
- Infraorder: Araneomorphae
- Family: Gnaphosidae
- Genus: Zelotes
- Species: Z. caldarius

Binomial name
- Zelotes caldarius (Purcell, 1907)

Synonyms
- Melanophora caldaria Purcell, 1907

Species of spider

Zelotes caldarius is a species of spider in the family Gnaphosidae. It is commonly known as the Montagu dark ground spider.

== Distribution ==
Zelotes caldarius is distributed across Botswana and South Africa. In South Africa, it is known from Limpopo and Western Cape, at altitudes ranging from 63 to 1,523 m above sea level.

Notable locations include the type locality of Montagu in the Western Cape, Kruger National Park, and Bontebok National Park.

== Habitat and ecology ==
The species inhabits the Savanna, Fynbos, and Nama Karoo biomes. These are free-running spiders that are found under stones during the day.

== Conservation ==
Zelotes caldarius is listed as Least Concern by the South African National Biodiversity Institute due to its wide geographic range. There are no significant threats to the species. It is protected in multiple reserves including Blouberg Nature Reserve, Kruger National Park, Lhuvhondo Nature Reserve, and Bontebok National Park.

== Taxonomy ==
The species was originally described by Purcell in 1907 from Montagu in the Western Cape as Melanophora caldaria. It was revised by FitzPatrick in 2007. The species is known from both sexes.
