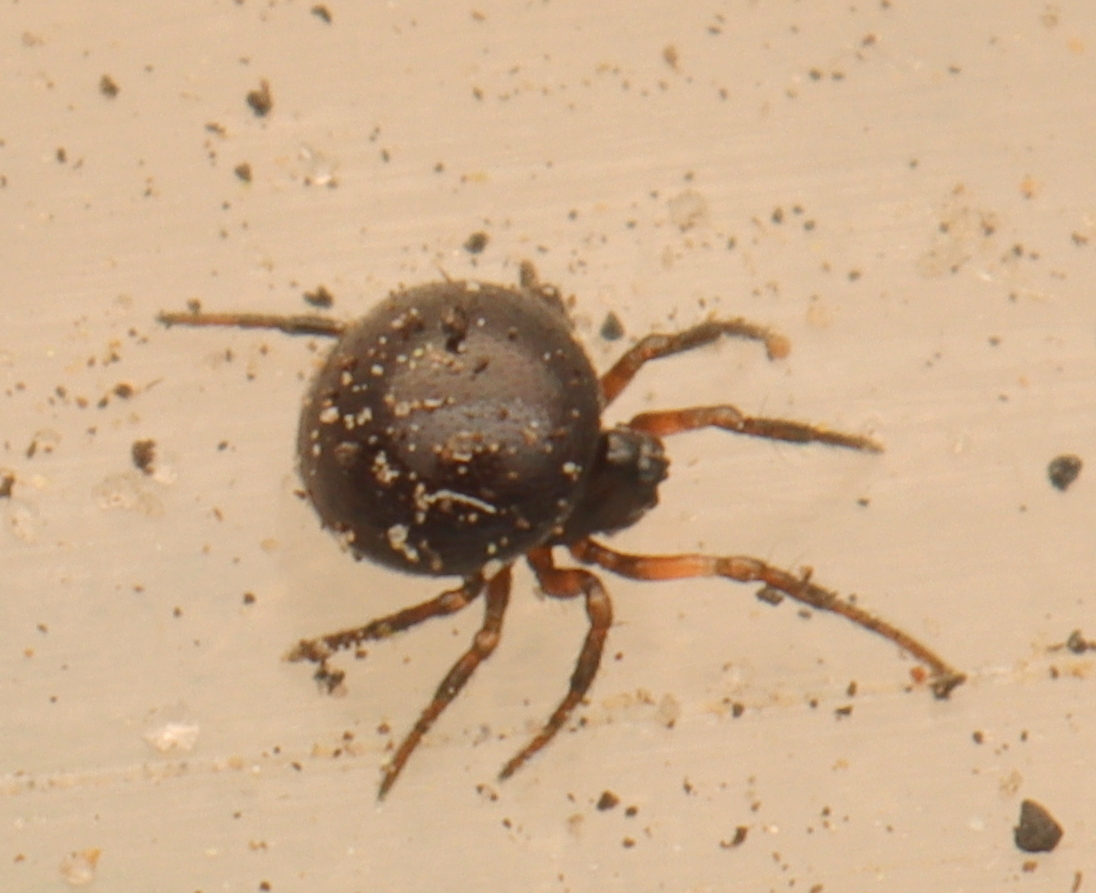

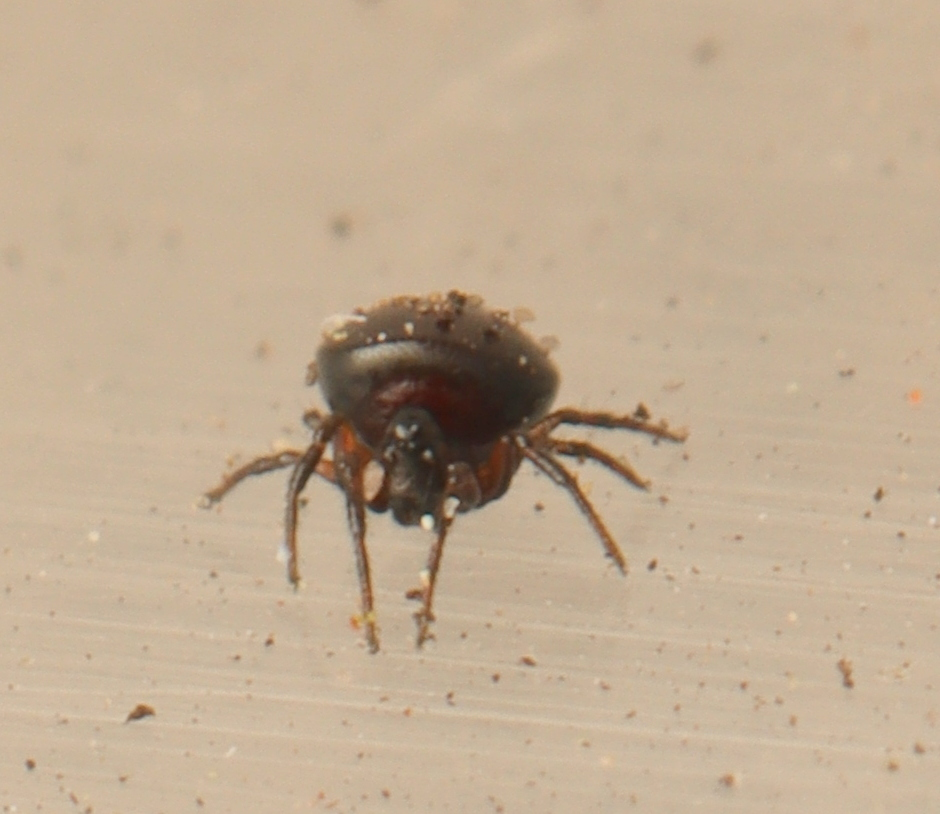

Scientific classification
- Kingdom: Animalia
- Phylum: Arthropoda
- Subphylum: Chelicerata
- Class: Arachnida
- Order: Araneae
- Infraorder: Araneomorphae
- Family: Anapidae
- Genus: Crozetulus
- Species: C. rhodesiensis

Binomial name
- Crozetulus rhodesiensis Brignoli, 1981

= Crozetulus rhodesiensis =

Species of spider

Crozetulus rhodesiensis is a species of spider in the family Anapidae. It is found in southern Africa, including Namibia, Zimbabwe, and South Africa.

== Etymology ==
The species epithet rhodesiensis refers to Rhodesia, the former name of Zimbabwe, where the species was first described.

== Distribution ==
Crozetulus rhodesiensis is distributed across southern Africa, with records from Namibia, Zimbabwe, and South Africa. In South Africa, it has been found in five provinces: Western Cape, Limpopo, Mpumalanga, and KwaZulu-Natal. The species occurs across multiple biomes including Fynbos, Forest, Nama Karoo, Indian Ocean Coastal Belt, and Savanna.

== Habitat ==
Like other members of the family Anapidae, C. rhodesiensis is a small, cryptozoic spider typically found in leaf litter where it constructs small, horizontal orb-webs. The species has been collected primarily near water sources, including the shores of rivers and lakes, particularly in reed beds. Specimens are usually obtained through sieving leaf litter and sweeping vegetation.

== Description ==
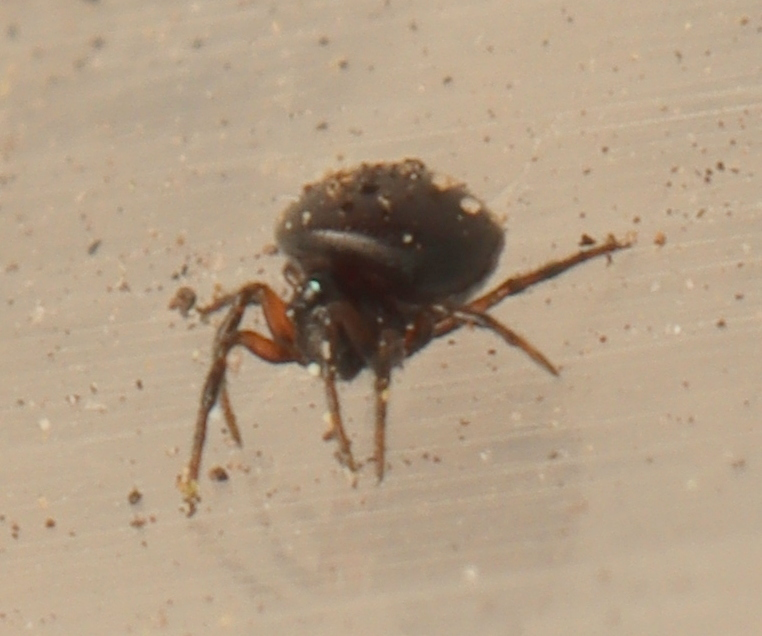

Crozetulus rhodesiensis is a small orb-web spider typical of the family Anapidae. The species was originally described from females only, but males were later described by Schütt in 2002. Both sexes are now known to science.

== Conservation ==
The species is considered to be of least concern due to its wide geographical distribution with an extent of occurrence of 625,729 km² and area of occupancy of 48 km². It occurs in six protected areas in South Africa, including De Hoop Nature Reserve, Bontebok National Park, Table Mountain National Park, and Karoo National Park. No specific conservation measures are currently recommended for this species.
