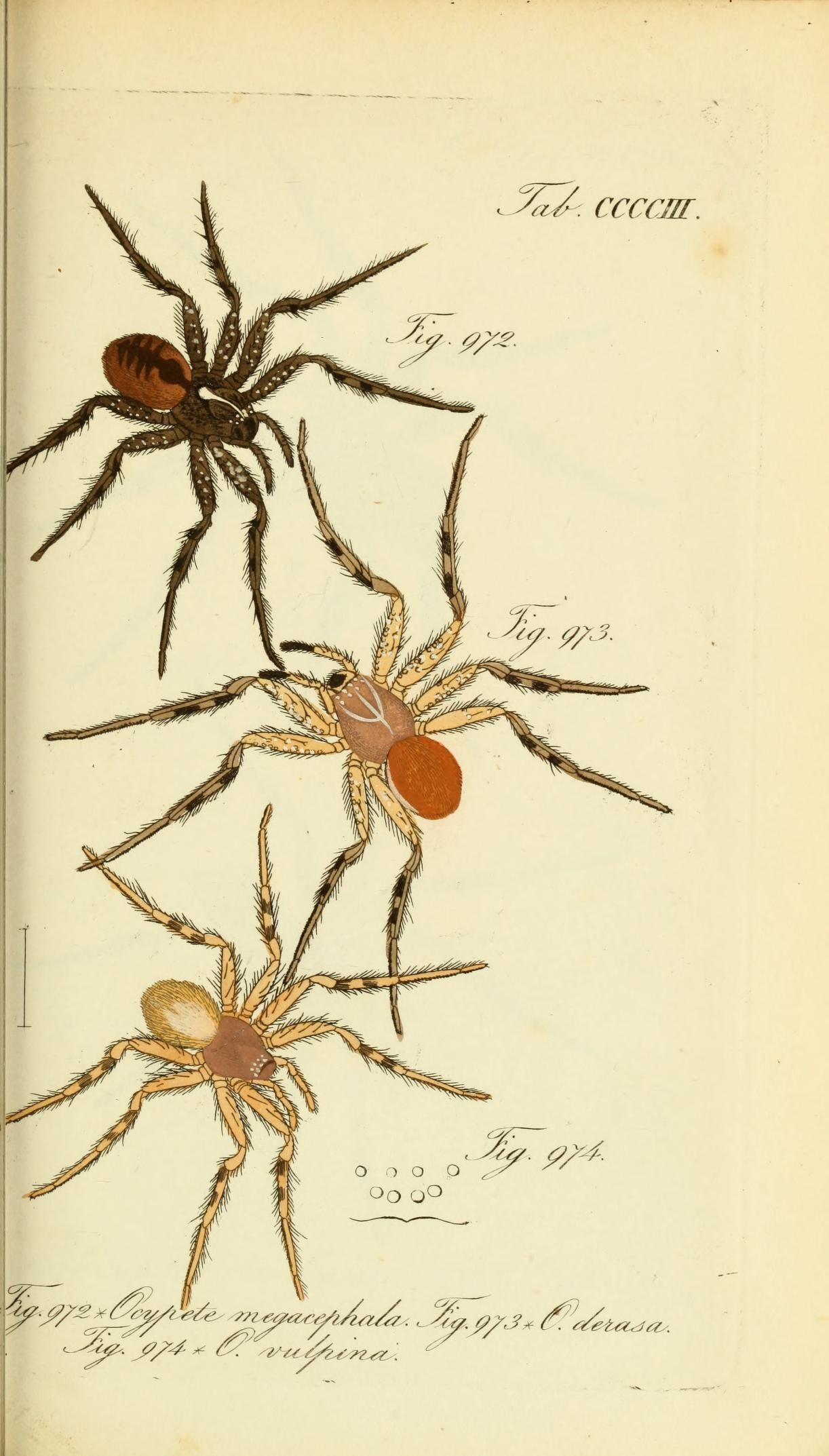
- Parapalystes megacephalus

Scientific classification
- Kingdom: Animalia
- Phylum: Arthropoda
- Subphylum: Chelicerata
- Class: Arachnida
- Order: Araneae
- Infraorder: Araneomorphae
- Family: Sparassidae
- Genus: Parapalystes
- Species: P. megacephalus

Binomial name
- Parapalystes megacephalus (C. L. Koch, 1845)

Synonyms
- Ocypete megacephala C. L. Koch, 1845; Olios megacephalus Simon, 1880; Palystes megacephalus Pocock, 1896; Remmius megacephalus Simon, 1897; Palystes lycosinus Croeser, 1996

= Parapalystes megacephalus =

Kogelberg parapalystes huntsman spider

Species of spider

Parapalystes megacephalus is a spider species in the family Sparassidae. It is endemic to South Africa and is commonly known as the Kogelberg Parapalystes huntsman spider.

== Distribution ==
Parapalystes megacephalus is found in the Western Cape province. The species has been recorded from Kogelberg Biosphere Reserve, Bontebok National Park, Kirstenbosch National Botanical Garden, Slanghoekvallei, and Onrus.

== Habitat and ecology ==
Parapalystes megacephalus is a plant dweller. The egg sac is deposited in plants in the Fynbos biome.

== Conservation ==
Parapalystes megacephalus is listed as Data Deficient by the South African National Biodiversity Institute. The species was originally described with the type locality given only as Cape of Good Hope. The status of the species remains obscure, and additional sampling is needed to collect more material and to determine the species' range. The species is protected in Bontebok National Park and Kirstenbosch National Botanical Garden.

== Taxonomy ==
Parapalystes megacephalus was originally described by C. L. Koch in 1845 as Ocypete megacephala. The type specimen has been lost. The genus has not been revised.
