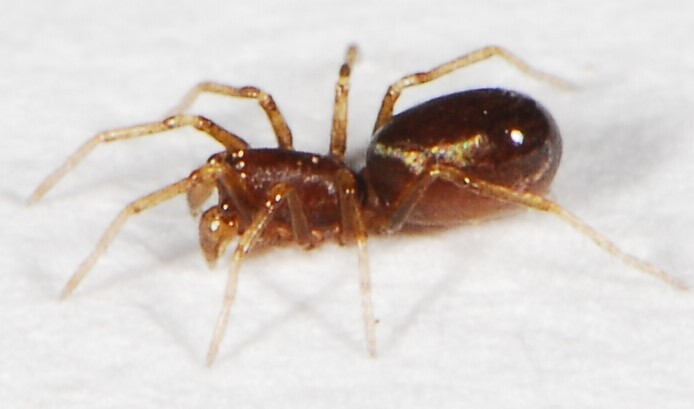
- Male H. loricata
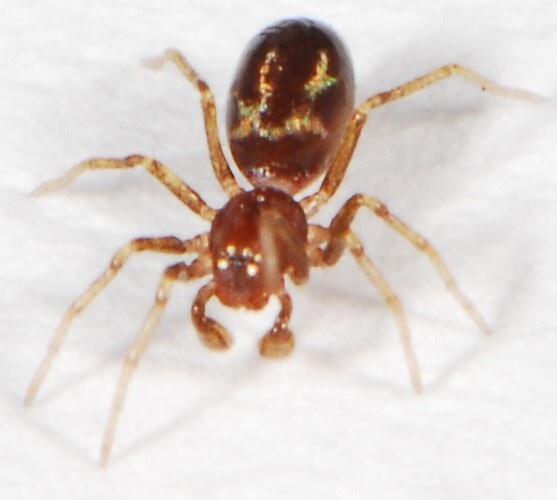
- Male H. loricata

Scientific classification
- Kingdom: Animalia
- Phylum: Arthropoda
- Subphylum: Chelicerata
- Class: Arachnida
- Order: Araneae
- Infraorder: Araneomorphae
- Family: Zodariidae
- Genus: Heradida; Simon

Type species
- Heradida loricata

Species
- 8, see text

= Heradida =

Genus of spiders

Heradida is a genus of spiders in the family Zodariidae with eight African species. It was first described in 1893 by Simon.

== Distribution ==
Most species are endemic to southern Africa, with one species found in Ethiopia.

== Species ==
As of September 2025, this genus includes eight species:

- Heradida bicincta Simon, 1910 – Namibia, South Africa
- Heradida extima Jocqué, 1987 – South Africa
- Heradida griffinae Jocqué, 1987 – Namibia
- Heradida loricata Simon, 1893 – South Africa (type species)
- Heradida minutissima Russell-Smith & Jocqué, 2015 – Tanzania
- Heradida quadrimaculata Pavesi, 1895 – Ethiopia
- Heradida speculigera Jocqué, 1987 – South Africa
- Heradida xerampelina Benoit, 1974 – South Africa
