= Heradida xerampelina =

Scientific classification
- Kingdom: Animalia
- Phylum: Arthropoda
- Subphylum: Chelicerata
- Class: Arachnida
- Order: Araneae
- Infraorder: Araneomorphae
- Family: Zodariidae
- Genus: Heradida
- Species: H. xerampelina

Binomial name
- Heradida xerampelina Benoit, 1974

Species of spider

Heradida xerampelina is a species of spider in the family Zodariidae. It is endemic to the Western Cape province of South Africa.

== Distribution ==
Heradida xerampelina is known only from Bitterfontein in the Western Cape province of South Africa.

== Habitat ==
The species is a ground-dwelling spider found running on soil surfaces. It occurs at an altitude of 354 metres above sea level.

== Description ==
Heradida xerampelina is known only from females. The placement of this species within the genus Heradida is considered problematic and it may belong to another genus.

== Conservation ==
The species is listed as Data Deficient due to taxonomic reasons. More sampling is needed to collect male specimens and determine the species' range and proper taxonomic placement.
