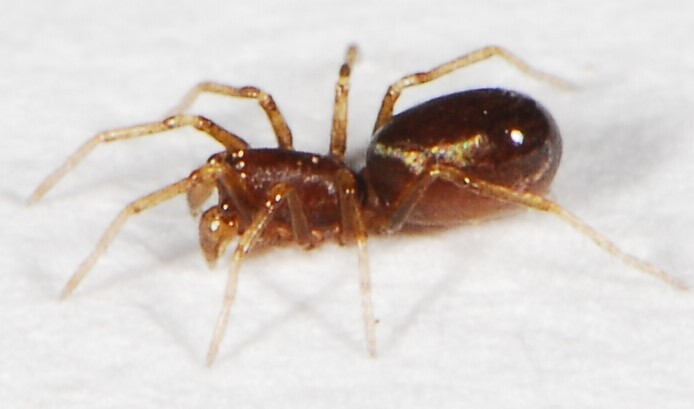
- Male
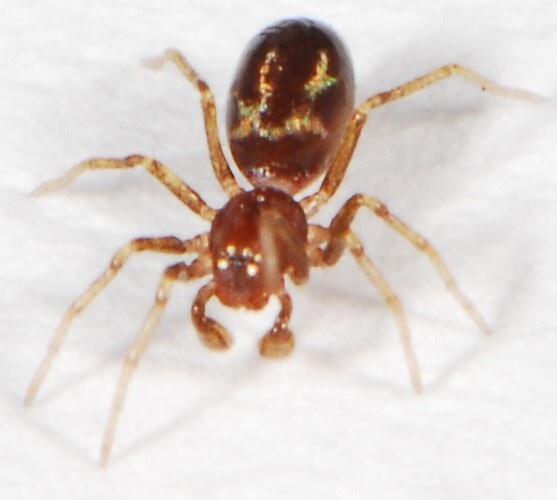
- Male

Scientific classification
- Kingdom: Animalia
- Phylum: Arthropoda
- Subphylum: Chelicerata
- Class: Arachnida
- Order: Araneae
- Infraorder: Araneomorphae
- Family: Zodariidae
- Genus: Heradida
- Species: H. loricata

Binomial name
- Heradida loricata Simon, 1893

= Heradida loricata =

Bloemfontein Heradida Ground Spider

Species of spider

Heradida loricata is a species of spider in the family Zodariidae. It is the type species of the genus Heradida and is endemic to South Africa, commonly known as the Bloemfontein Heradida ground spider.

== Distribution ==
Heradida loricata occurs in the Free State and Northern Cape provinces of South Africa. Localities include Bloemfontein, Luckhoff, Kalkfontein Dam Nature Reserve, Benfontein Game Reserve, and Hopetown.

== Habitat ==
The species inhabits the Grassland biome at altitudes ranging from 1107 to 1399 metres above sea level. It is a ground-dwelling species typically found running on soil surfaces and collected using pitfall traps.

== Description ==
Heradida loricata is described only from females. Females have a total length of 1.96 mm. The carapace, chelicerae, and sternum are pale brown to yellowish brown. The scutum is medium brown with a darker margin, while the remainder of the opisthosoma is cream to yellowish brown.

== Conservation ==
The species is listed as Data Deficient due to taxonomic reasons. It is protected in Kalkfontein Dam Nature Reserve and Benfontein Game Reserve. More sampling is needed to collect male specimens and determine the species' full range.
