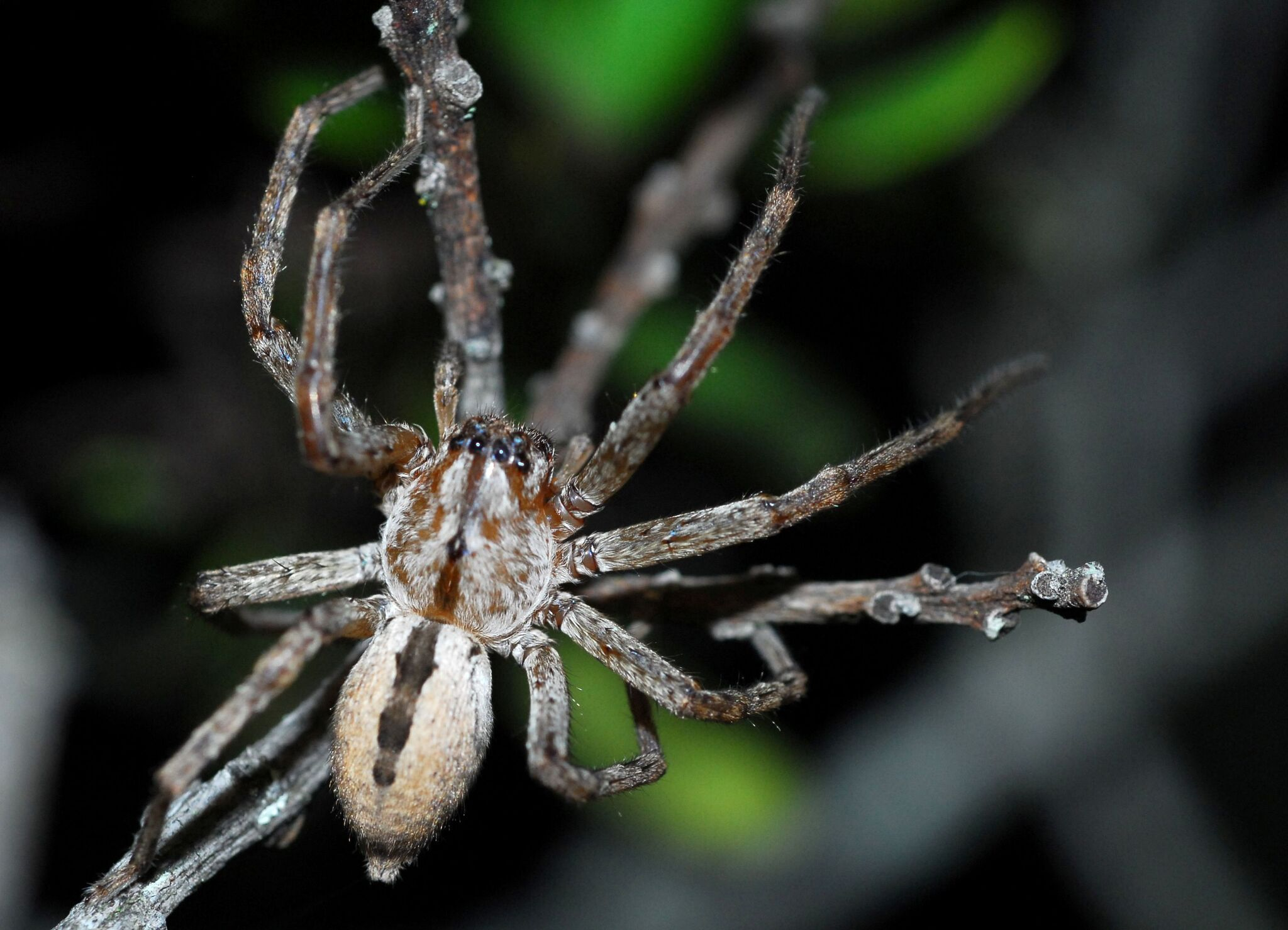
- Female
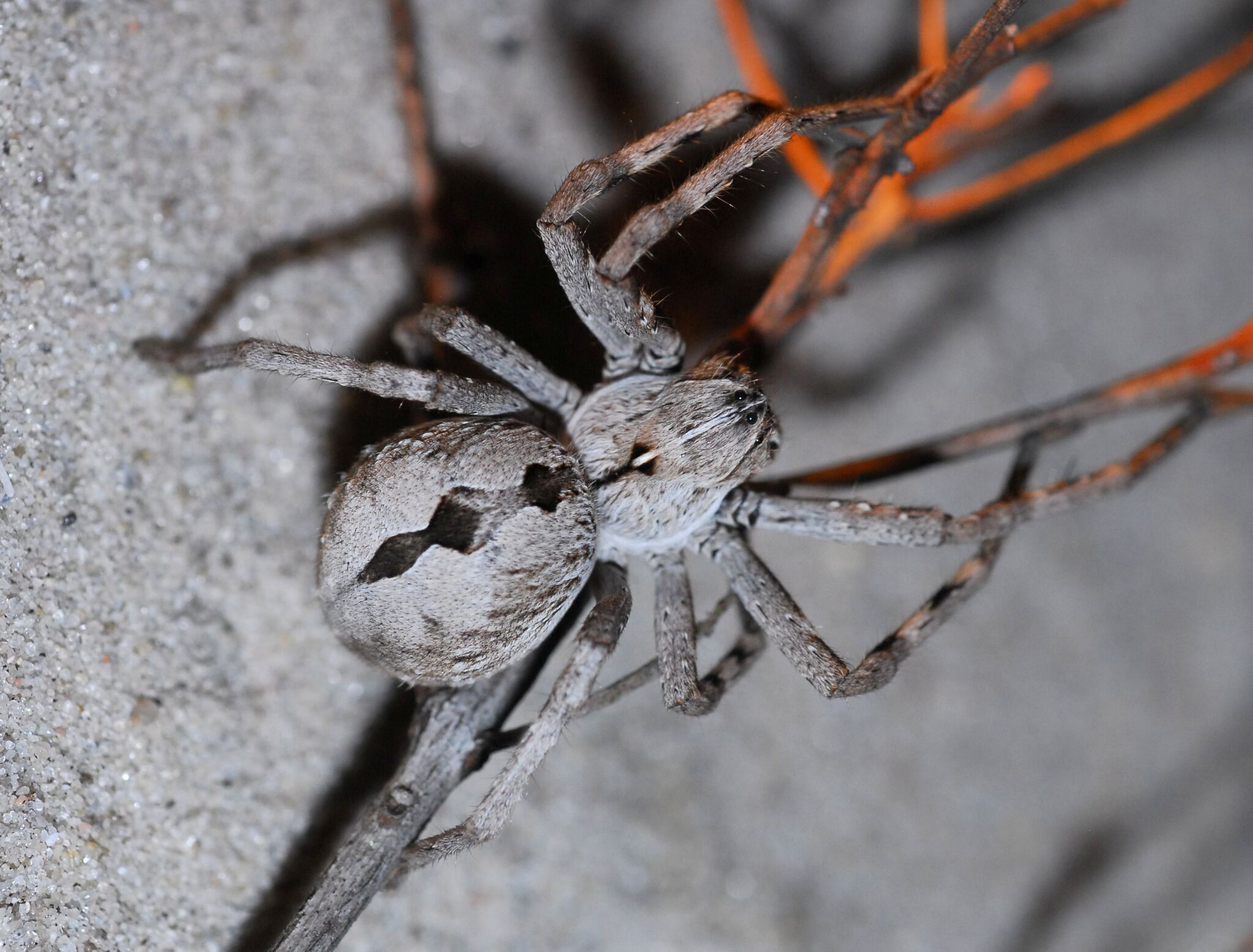
- Female

Scientific classification
- Kingdom: Animalia
- Phylum: Arthropoda
- Subphylum: Chelicerata
- Class: Arachnida
- Order: Araneae
- Infraorder: Araneomorphae
- Family: Sparassidae
- Genus: Parapalystes
- Species: P. euphorbiae

Binomial name
- Parapalystes euphorbiae Croeser, 1996

= Parapalystes euphorbiae =

Port Nolloth's parapalystes huntsman spider

Species of spider

Parapalystes euphorbiae is a spider species in the family Sparassidae. It is endemic to South Africa and is commonly known as Port Nolloth's Parapalystes huntsman spider.

== Distribution ==
Parapalystes euphorbiae is found in the Northern Cape province. The species has been recorded from Noup, Port Nolloth, Blackridge farm near Groblershoop, and Richtersveld National Park. It occurs at altitudes ranging from 16 to 859 m.

== Habitat and ecology ==
Parapalystes euphorbiae is a free-living plant dweller. The spiders were sampled from retreats in low leafless Euphorbia shrubs growing on dune hummocks in the Desert and Succulent Karoo biomes.

== Description ==
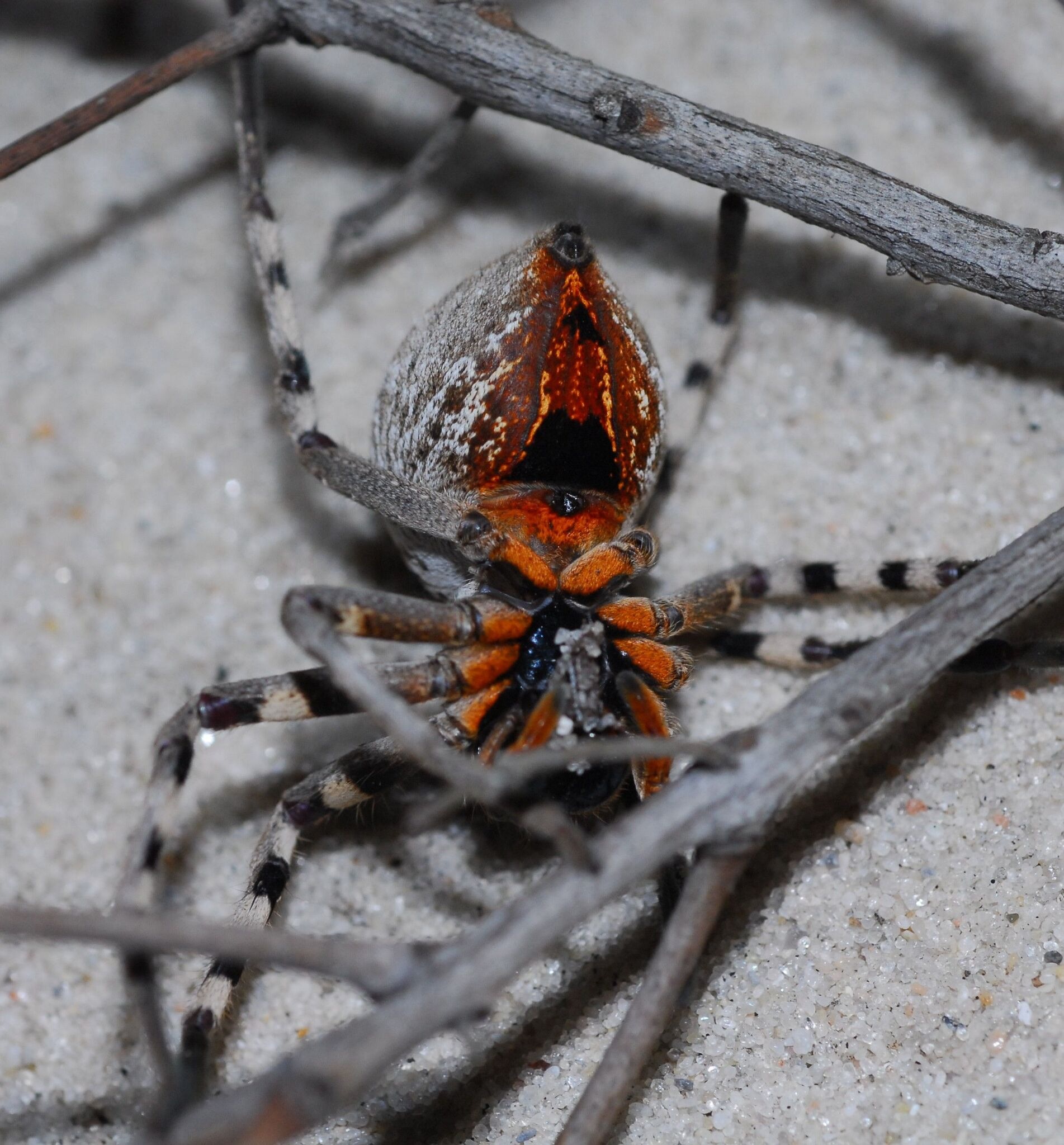
female

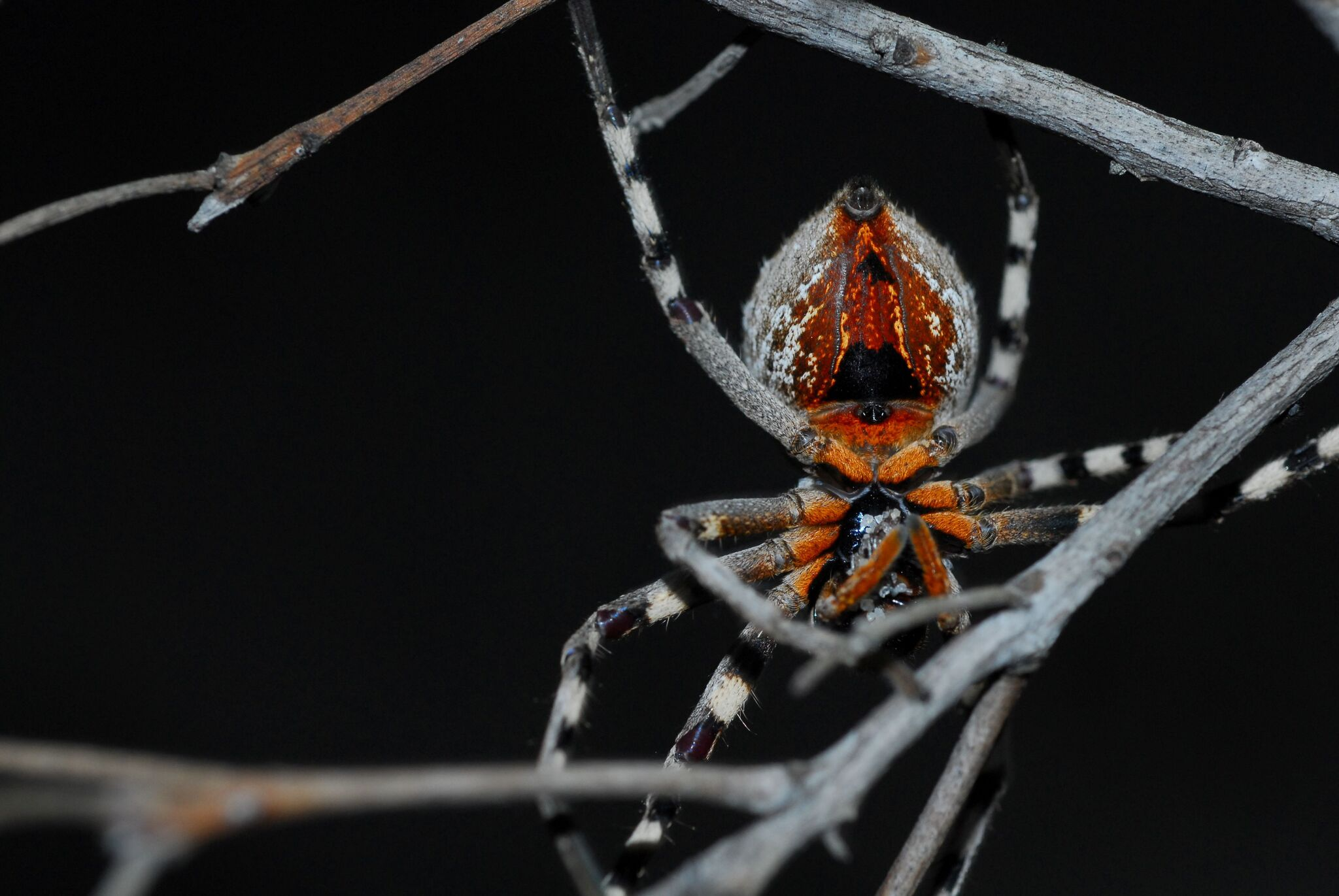
female

== Conservation ==
Parapalystes euphorbiae is listed as Least Concern by the South African National Biodiversity Institute due to its wide geographic range. The species is protected in Richtersveld National Park.
