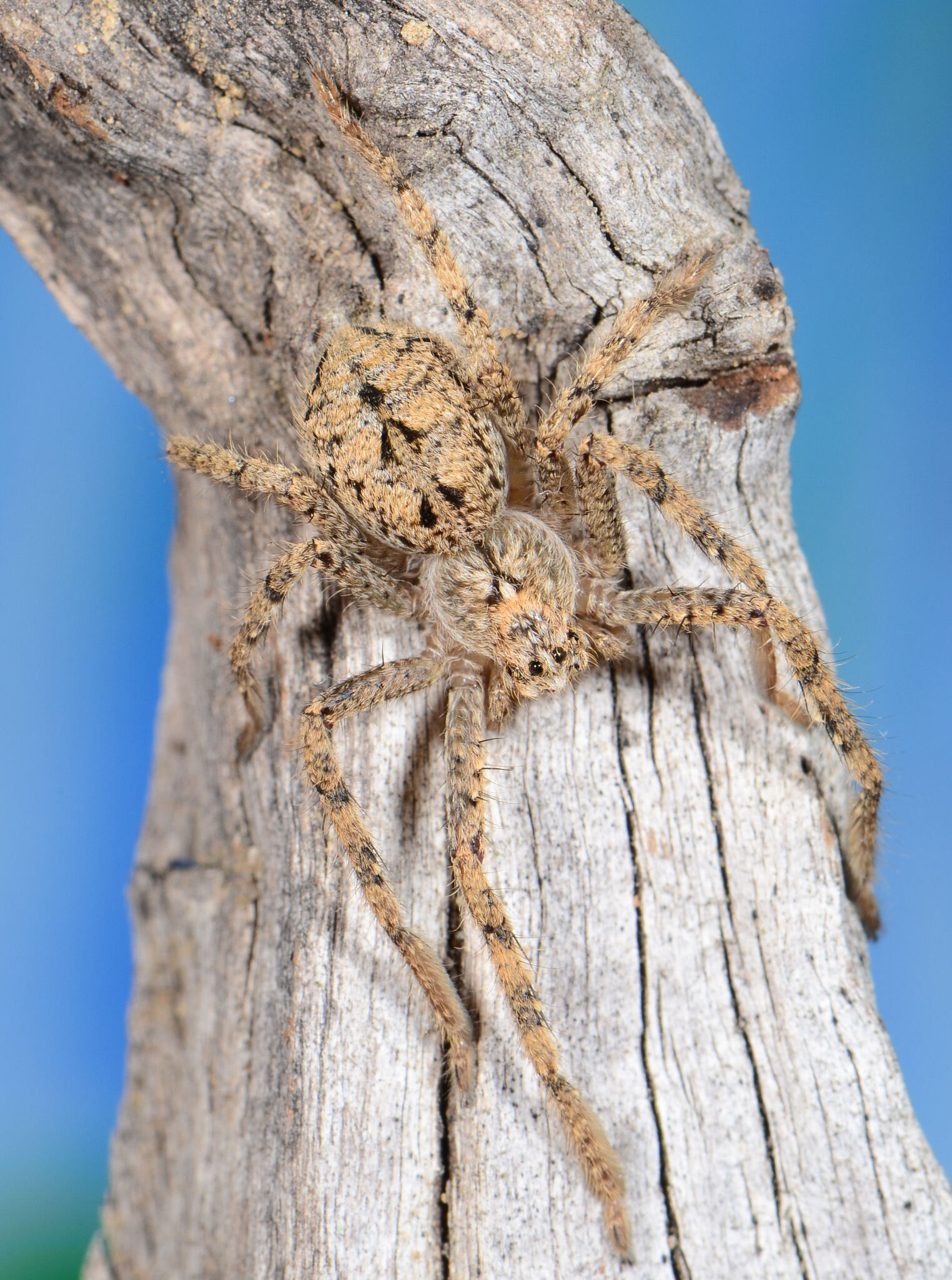
- Juvenile female
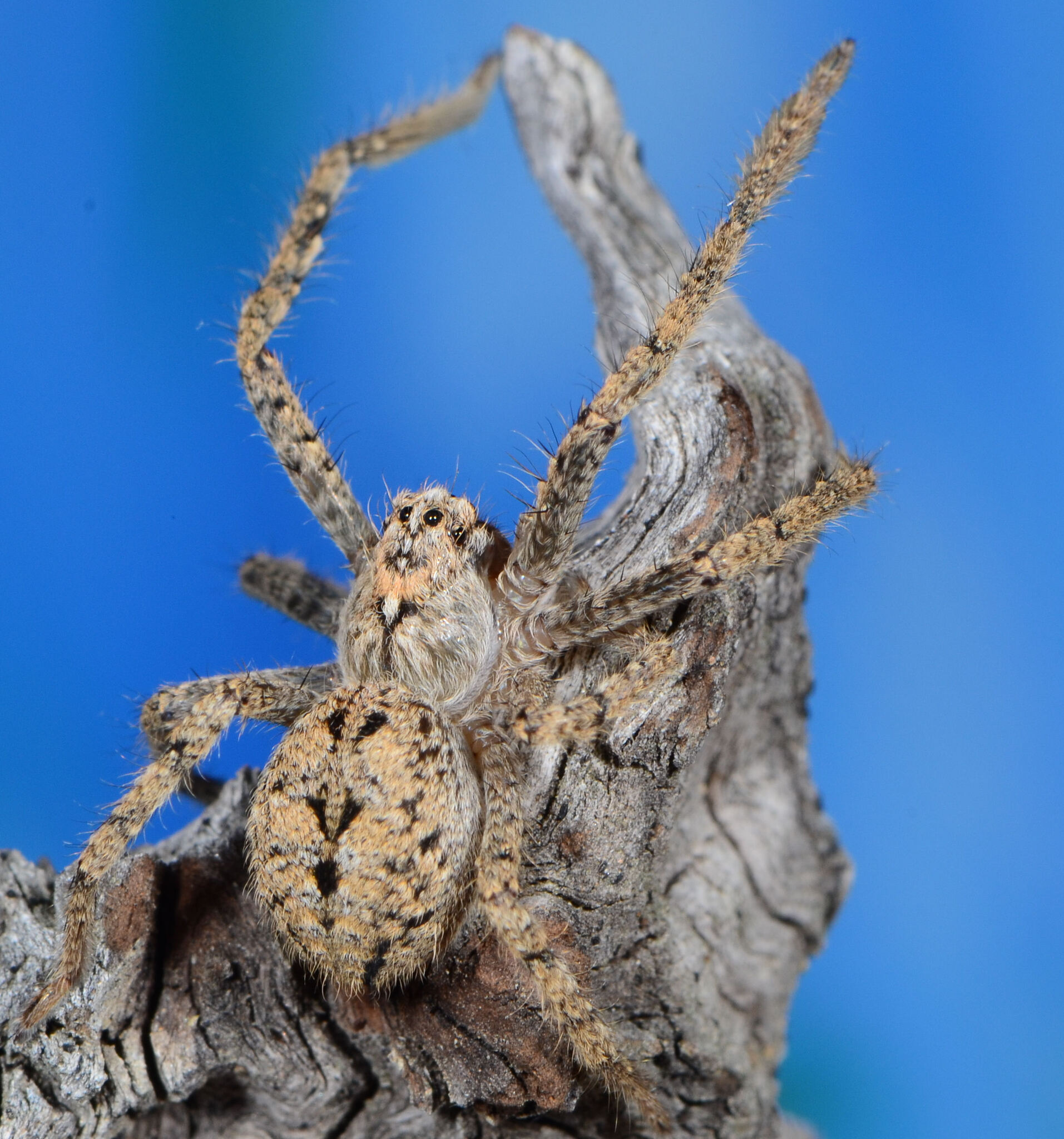
- Juvenile female

Scientific classification
- Kingdom: Animalia
- Phylum: Arthropoda
- Subphylum: Chelicerata
- Class: Arachnida
- Order: Araneae
- Infraorder: Araneomorphae
- Family: Sparassidae
- Genus: Parapalystes
- Species: P. lycosinus

Binomial name
- Parapalystes lycosinus (Pocock, 1900)

Synonyms
- Palystes lycosinus Pocock, 1900; Parapalystes megalocephalus Jäger & Kunz, 2005

= Parapalystes lycosinus =

East Cape parapalystes huntsman spider

Species of spider

Parapalystes lycosinus is a spider species in the family Sparassidae. It is endemic to South Africa and is commonly known as the East Cape Parapalystes huntsman spider.

== Distribution ==
Parapalystes lycosinus is found in the Eastern Cape and Western Cape provinces. The species has been sampled from Port Elizabeth, Addo Elephant National Park, Fort Fordyce Forest Reserve, Commando Drift Nature Reserve, Karoo National Park, Aardvark Nature Reserve, and Montagu. It occurs at altitudes ranging from 7 to 1,212 m.

== Habitat and ecology ==
Parapalystes lycosinus is a free-living plant dweller sampled from the Thicket, Fynbos, and Nama Karoo biomes.

== Description ==
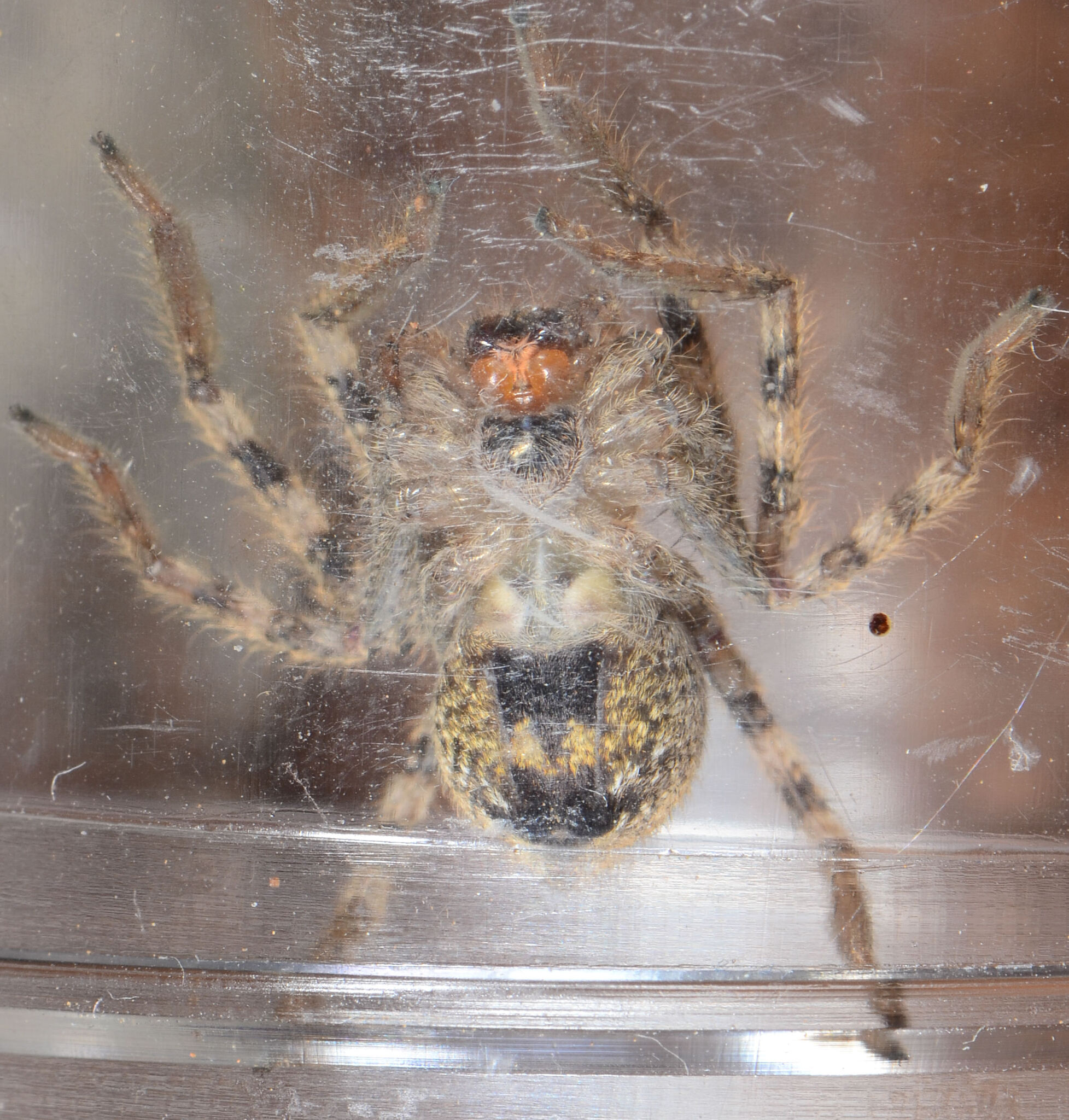
juvenile female

== Conservation ==
Parapalystes lycosinus is listed as Least Concern by the South African National Biodiversity Institute due to its wide geographic range. The species is protected in Karoo National Park, Aardvark Nature Reserve, and Addo Elephant National Park.

== Taxonomy ==
Parapalystes lycosinus was originally described by Pocock in 1900 as Palystes lycosinus from Port Elizabeth in the Eastern Cape. The genus has not been revised.
