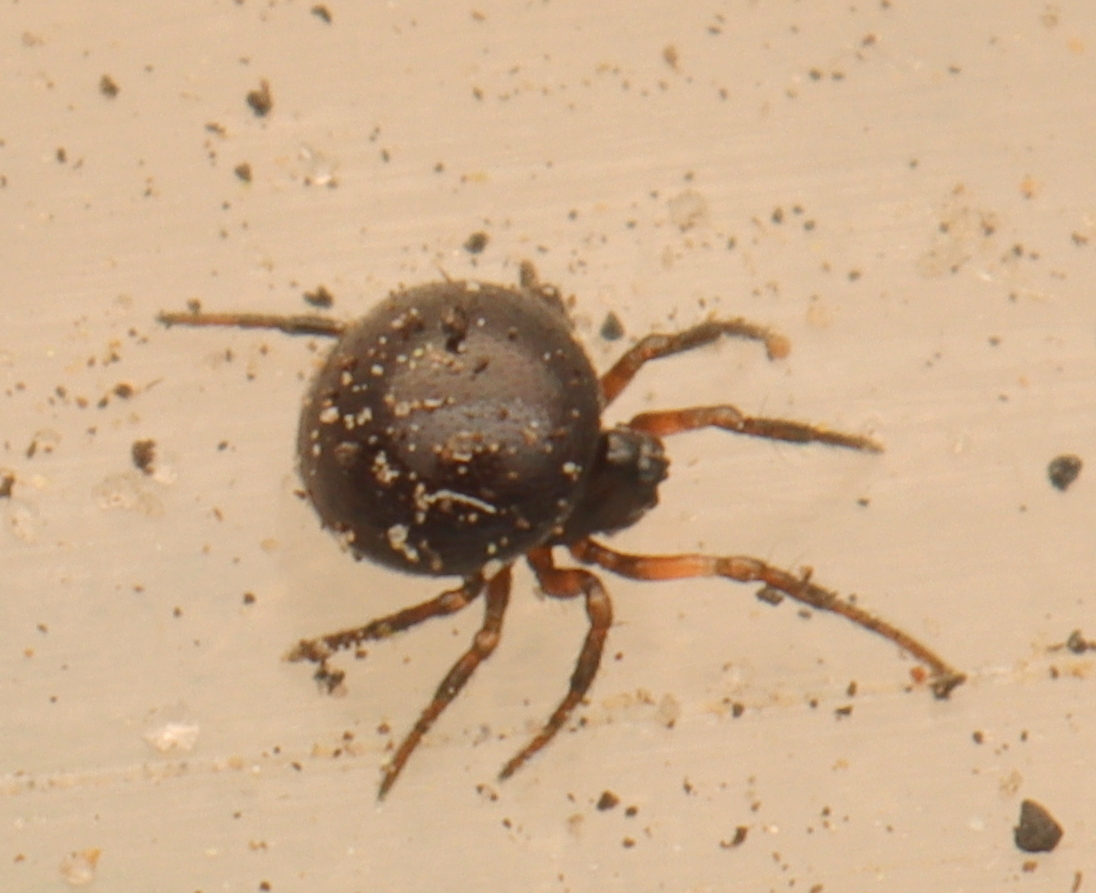
- C. rhodesiensis
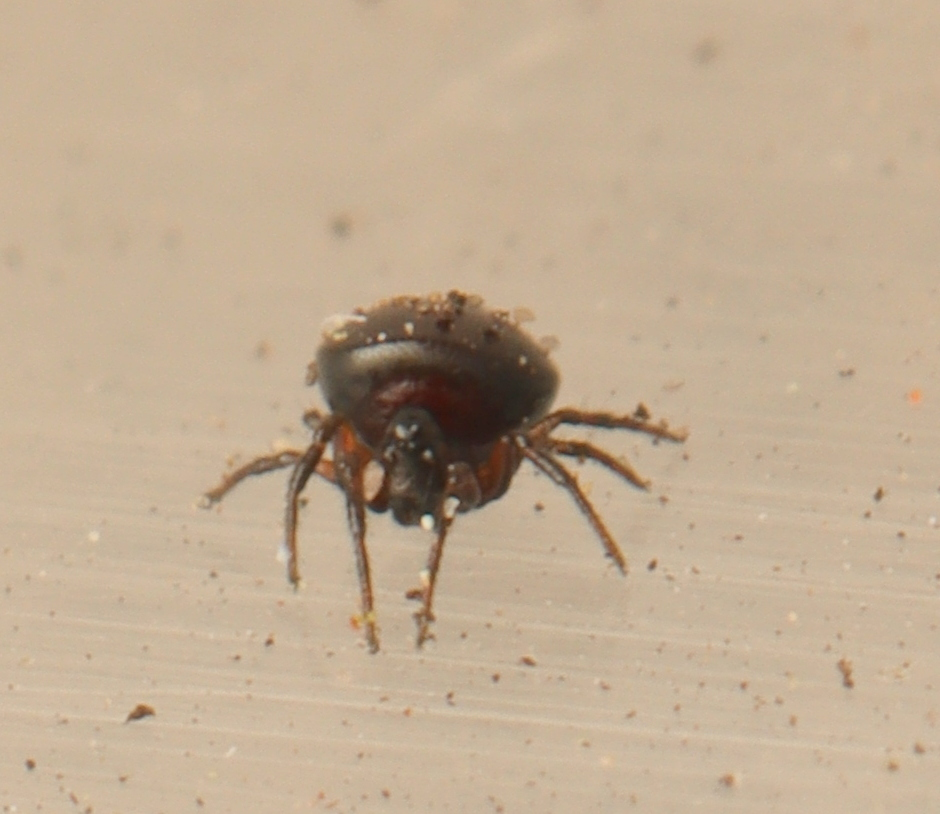
- C. rhodesiensis

Scientific classification
- Kingdom: Animalia
- Phylum: Arthropoda
- Subphylum: Chelicerata
- Class: Arachnida
- Order: Araneae
- Infraorder: Araneomorphae
- Family: Anapidae
- Genus: Crozetulus; Hickman, 1939

Type species
- C. minutus Hickman, 1939

Species
- 4, see text

Synonyms
- Speleoderces Lawrence, 1964

= Crozetulus =

Genus of spiders

Crozetulus is a genus of African araneomorph spiders in the family Anapidae, first described by V. V. Hickman in 1939.

== Species ==
As of October 2026 it contains four species:

- Crozetulus minutus Hickman, 1939 – Crozet Is.
- Crozetulus rhodesiensis Brignoli, 1981 – Namibia, Zimbabwe, South Africa
- Crozetulus rotundus (Forster, 1974) – Congo
- Crozetulus scutatus (Lawrence, 1964) – South Africa
