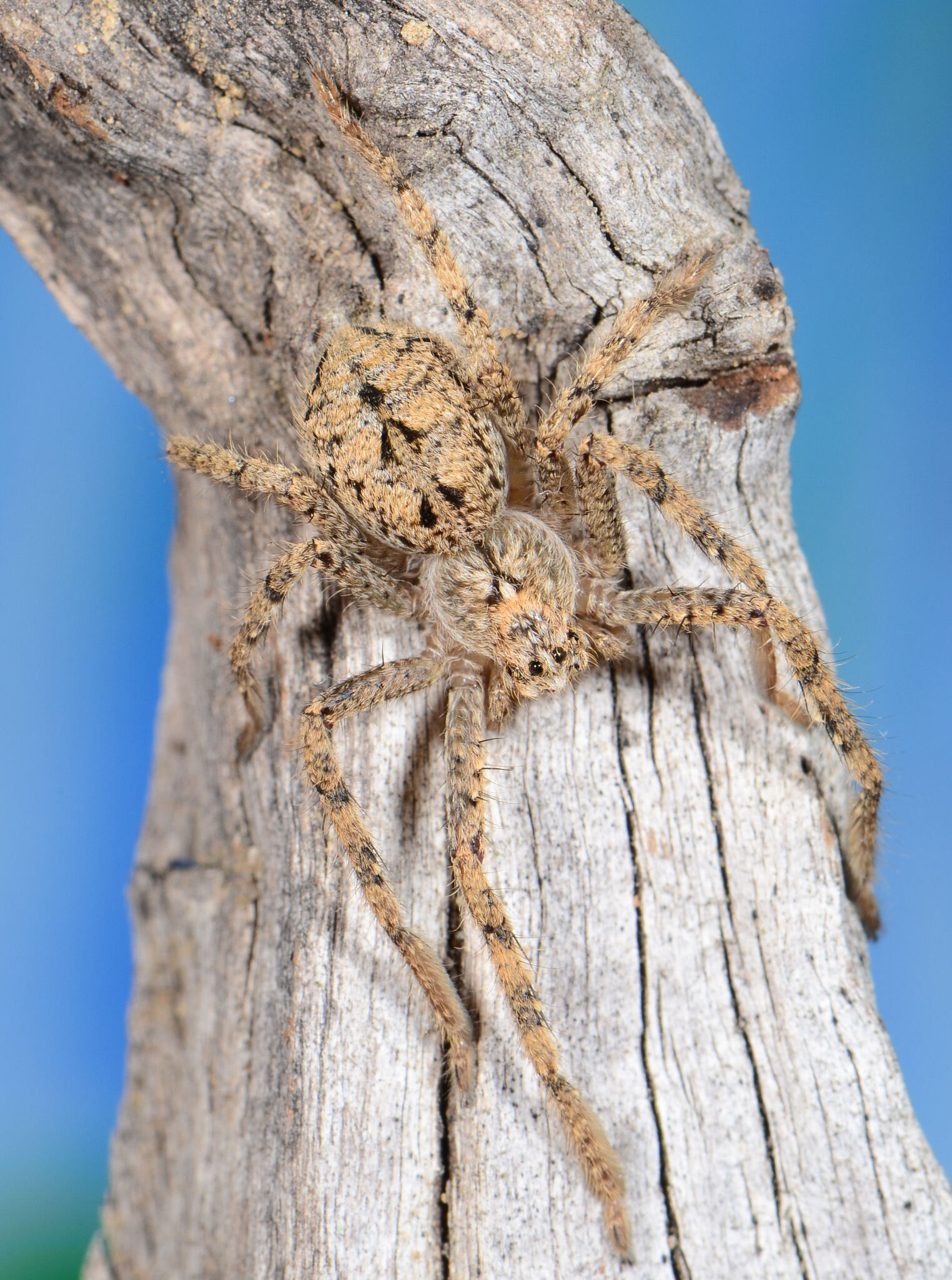
- Juvenile female P. lycosinus
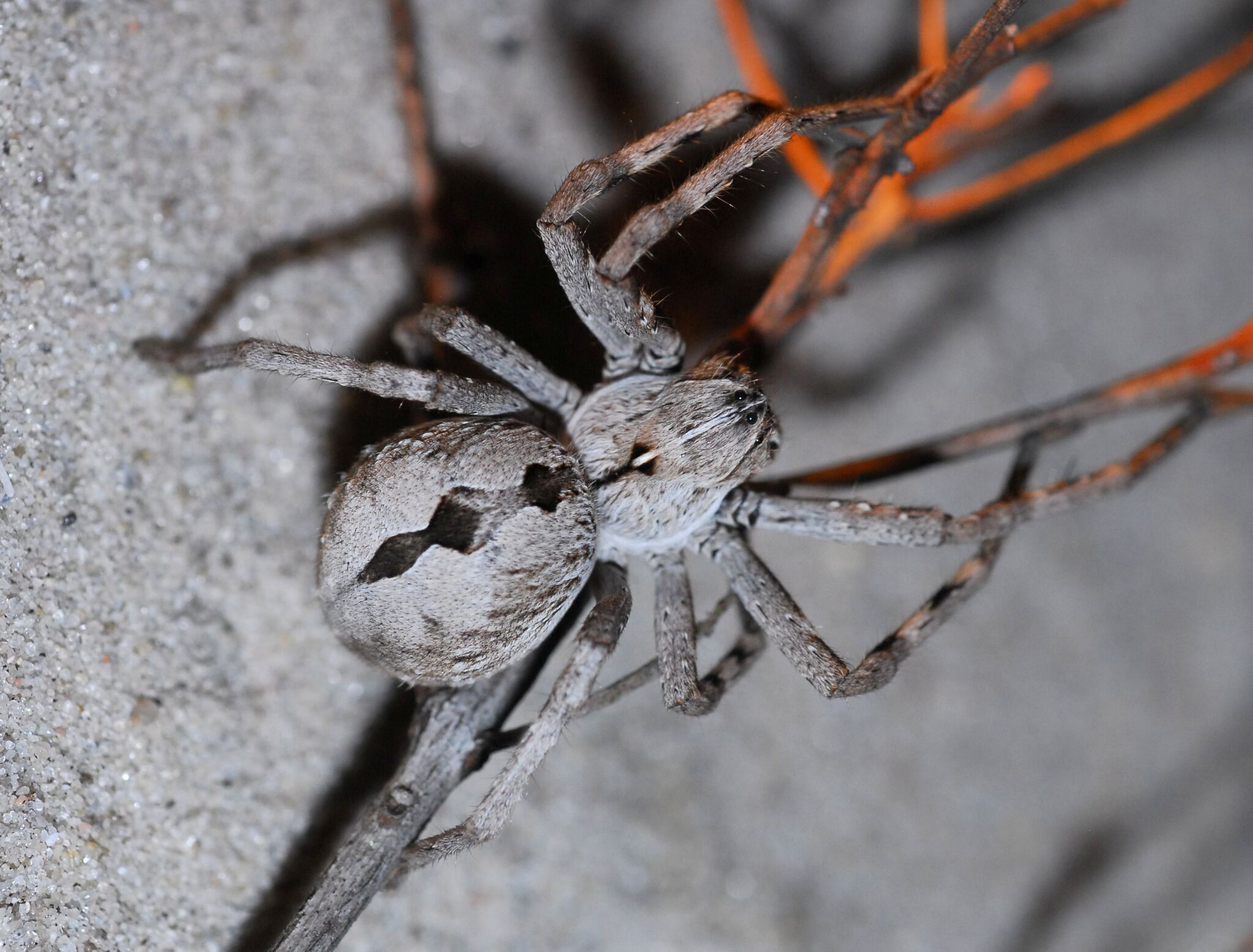
- Female P. euphorbiae

Scientific classification
- Kingdom: Animalia
- Phylum: Arthropoda
- Subphylum: Chelicerata
- Class: Arachnida
- Order: Araneae
- Infraorder: Araneomorphae
- Family: Sparassidae
- Genus: Parapalystes; Croeser, 1996

Type species
- P. euphorbiae Croeser, 1996

Species
- 5, see text

= Parapalystes =

Genus of spiders

Parapalystes is a genus of South African huntsman spiders that was first described by Peter M. C. Croeser in 1996.

== Description ==
Parapalystes species resemble rain spiders in having a white line on the clypeal edge.

The carapace has the cephalic region domed posterior to the posterior eye row. Dorsally there are two fine white lines, thinly divided, running from the middle posterior eye row to a white patch immediately anterior to the fovea. The clypeus is yellow, and yellow stripes are often vestigial or absent at the outer margin of the chelicerae. The sternum is black except for a white to yellow pattern on the anterior third.

The abdomen has a solid heart mark. Each coxa on the legs has two to five round black marks ventrally.

== Life style ==
Parapalystes species are free-living plant dwellers.

== Species ==
As of September 2025, this genus includes five species, all endemic to South Africa:

- Parapalystes cultrifer (Pocock, 1900)
- Parapalystes euphorbiae Croeser, 1996 (type species)
- Parapalystes lycosinus (Pocock, 1900)
- Parapalystes megacephalus (C. L. Koch, 1845)
- Parapalystes whiteae (Pocock, 1902)
