= Parapalystes whiteae =

Grahamstown parapalystes huntsman spider

Scientific classification
- Kingdom: Animalia
- Phylum: Arthropoda
- Subphylum: Chelicerata
- Class: Arachnida
- Order: Araneae
- Infraorder: Araneomorphae
- Family: Sparassidae
- Genus: Parapalystes
- Species: P. whiteae

Binomial name
- Parapalystes whiteae (Pocock, 1902)

Synonyms
- Palystes whiteae Pocock, 1902

Species of spider

Parapalystes whiteae is a spider species in the family Sparassidae. It is endemic to South Africa and is commonly known as the Grahamstown Parapalystes huntsman spider.

== Distribution ==
Parapalystes whiteae is found in the Eastern Cape province. The species has been sampled from Grahamstown (Brak Kloof) and Biesiesfontein. It occurs at altitudes ranging from 333 to 565 m.

== Habitat and ecology ==
Parapalystes whiteae is a free-living plant dweller sampled from the Thicket Biome.

== Conservation ==
Parapalystes whiteae is listed as Data Deficient by the South African National Biodiversity Institute. The species is presently known only from two localities. The status of the species remains obscure, and additional sampling is needed to collect the female and to determine the species' range.

== Taxonomy ==
Parapalystes whiteae was originally described in 1902 as Palystes whiteae from Grahamstown. The genus has not been revised, and only the male is known.
