= Heradida bicincta =

Steinkopf Heradida Ground Spider

Conservation status
- Least Concern (SANBI Red List)

Scientific classification
- Kingdom: Animalia
- Phylum: Arthropoda
- Subphylum: Chelicerata
- Class: Arachnida
- Order: Araneae
- Infraorder: Araneomorphae
- Family: Zodariidae
- Genus: Heradida
- Species: H. bicincta

Binomial name
- Heradida bicincta Simon, 1910

Species of spider

Heradida bicincta is a species of spider in the family Zodariidae. It is found in Namibia and South Africa and is commonly known as the Steinkopf Heradida ground spider.

== Distribution ==
Heradida bicincta is distributed across Namibia and South Africa. In South Africa, it occurs in the Limpopo and Northern Cape provinces, with records from the Vhembe Biosphere Reserve, Richtersveld Transfrontier National Park, Namaqua National Park, and Tankwa Karoo National Park.

== Habitat ==
The species inhabits multiple biomes including Desert, Savanna, and Succulent Karoo at altitudes ranging from 250 to 1,432 metres above sea level. It is typically found running on soil surfaces and has been collected using pitfall traps.

== Description ==
Heradida bicincta is known only from females. The diagnostic characteristic is the presence of two pale yellow bands on the dorsal scutum. Both sexes have a total length of approximately 1.8-2.2 mm, typical for the genus Heradida.

== Ecology ==
Heradida bicincta are small ground-dwelling spiders that exhibit ant mimicry in both appearance and behavior. This mimicry helps them avoid predators and sometimes aids in hunting. They are free-living and commonly sampled in pitfall traps.

== Conservation ==
The species is listed as Least Concern by SANBI. Despite its wide geographical range across southern Africa, more sampling is needed to collect male specimens. In South Africa, it is protected in several reserves including Luvhondo Nature Reserve, Richtersveld Transfrontier National Park, and Blouberg Nature Reserve.
