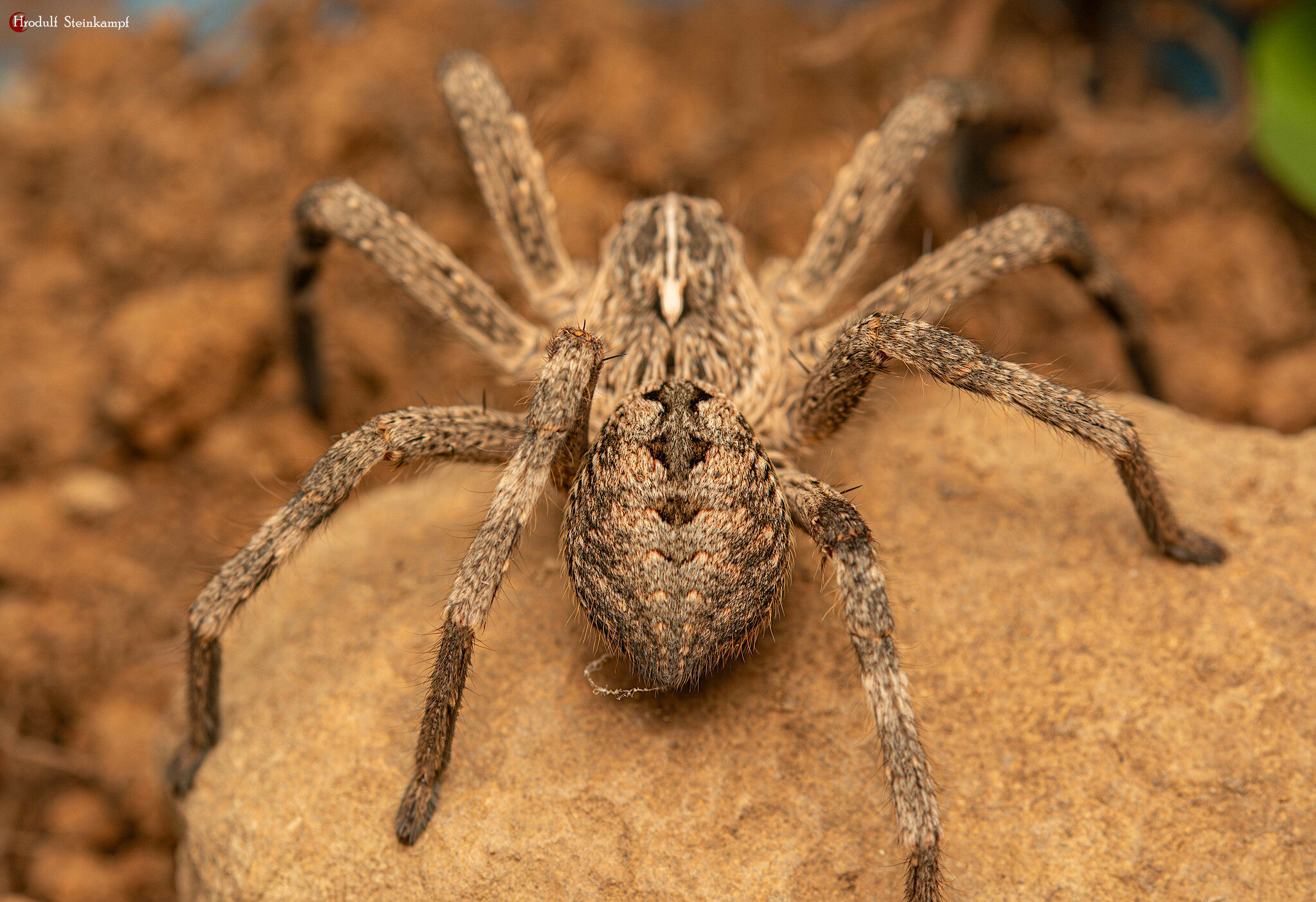
- female
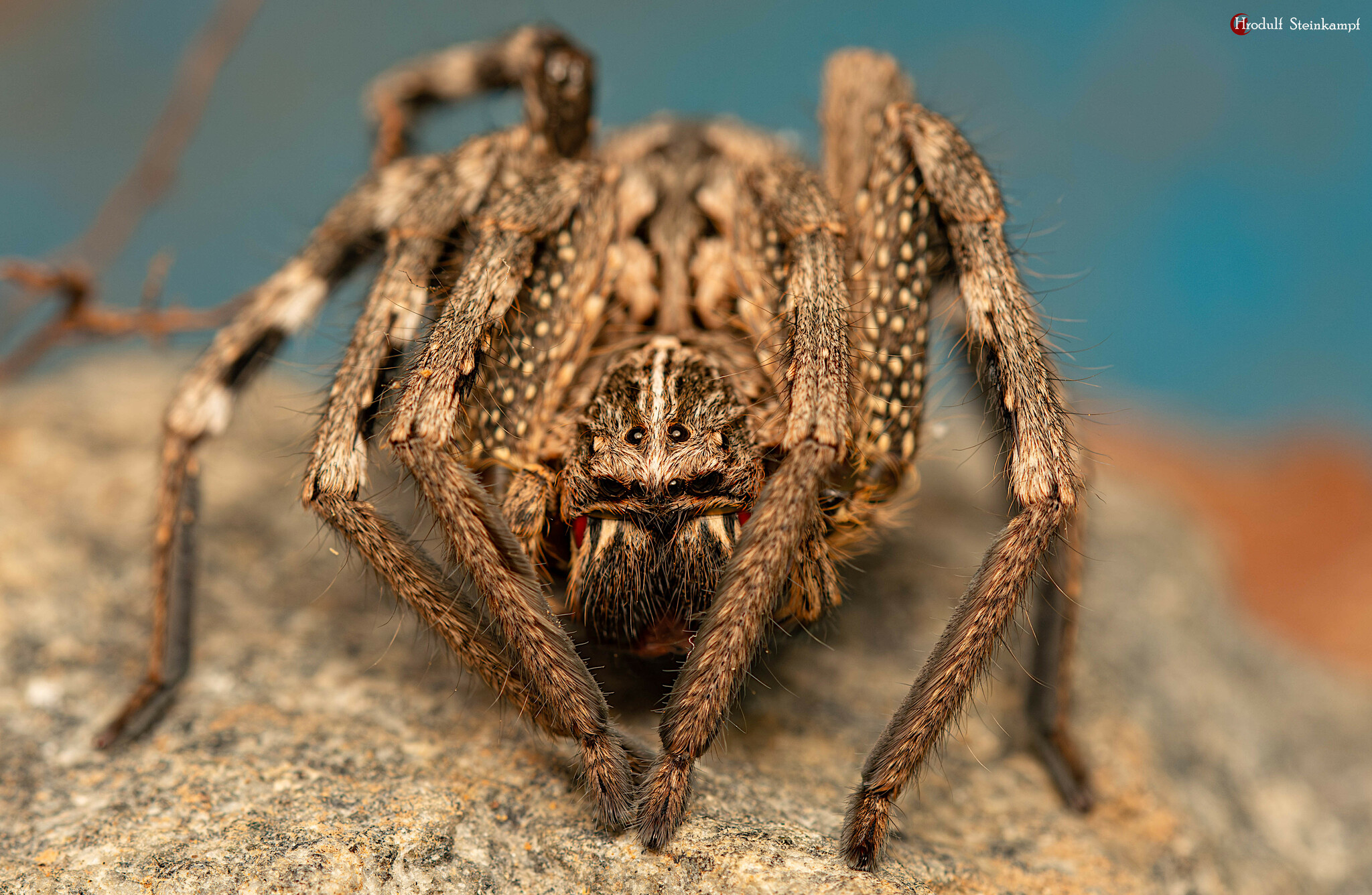
- female

Scientific classification
- Kingdom: Animalia
- Phylum: Arthropoda
- Subphylum: Chelicerata
- Class: Arachnida
- Order: Araneae
- Infraorder: Araneomorphae
- Family: Sparassidae
- Genus: Parapalystes
- Species: P. cultrifer

Binomial name
- Parapalystes cultrifer (Pocock, 1900)

Synonyms
- Palystes cultrifer Pocock, 1900

= Parapalystes cultrifer =

Grahamstown parapalystes huntsman spider

Species of spider

Parapalystes cultrifer is a spider species in the family Sparassidae. It is endemic to South Africa and is commonly known as the Grahamstown Parapalystes huntsman spider.

== Distribution ==
Parapalystes cultrifer is found in the Eastern Cape and Northern Cape provinces. The species is protected in two national parks: Mountain Zebra National Park and Namaqua National Park. Notable locations include Grahamstown and Springbok. It occurs at altitudes ranging from 565 to 1,358 m.

== Habitat and ecology ==
Parapalystes cultrifer is a plant dweller sampled from Thicket and Succulent Karoo biomes.

== Conservation ==
Parapalystes cultrifer is listed as Least Concern by the South African National Biodiversity Institute due to its wide geographic range.

== Taxonomy ==
Parapalystes cultrifer was originally described by Pocock in 1900 as Palystes cultrifer from Grahamstown in the Eastern Cape. The genus has not been revised.
