= Heradida extima =

Scientific classification
- Kingdom: Animalia
- Phylum: Arthropoda
- Subphylum: Chelicerata
- Class: Arachnida
- Order: Araneae
- Infraorder: Araneomorphae
- Family: Zodariidae
- Genus: Heradida
- Species: H. extima

Binomial name
- Heradida extima Jocqué, 1987

Species of spider

Heradida extima is a species of spider in the family Zodariidae. It is endemic to South Africa.

== Distribution ==
Heradida extima is found in the Western Cape and Eastern Cape provinces of South Africa. Records include the Cederberg Wilderness Area, De Hoop Nature Reserve, and Asante Sana Private Game Reserve.

== Habitat ==
The species inhabits the Fynbos biome at altitudes ranging from 15 to 1479 m above sea level. It is a ground-dwelling species typically found running on soil surfaces and collected using pitfall traps.

== Description ==
Heradida extima is known only from females. Females have a total length of 2 mm. The carapace is dark brown, paler towards the front. Legs are medium brown. The opisthosoma has a dark sepia dorsal scutum that is slightly mottled.

== Conservation ==
The species is listed as Data Deficient due to taxonomic reasons. Although rare, it receives protection in several reserves including the Cederberg Wilderness Area, Asante Sana Private Game Reserve, and De Hoop Nature Reserve. More sampling is needed to collect male specimens and determine the species' full range.
