= Crozetulus scutatus =

Scientific classification
- Kingdom: Animalia
- Phylum: Arthropoda
- Subphylum: Chelicerata
- Class: Arachnida
- Order: Araneae
- Infraorder: Araneomorphae
- Family: Anapidae
- Genus: Crozetulus
- Species: C. scutatus

Binomial name
- Crozetulus scutatus (Lawrence, 1964)

Synonyms
- Speleoderces scutatus Lawrence, 1964

Species of spider

Crozetulus scutatus is a species of spider in the family Anapidae. It is endemic to the Western Cape province of South Africa, where it is known by the common name cape cave orb-web spider.

== Taxonomy ==
The species was originally described in 1964 by R. F. Lawrence as Speleoderces scutatus from specimens collected in the Wynberg Caves on Table Mountain. It was later transferred to the genus Crozetulus by Paolo Marcello Brignoli in 1981.

== Distribution ==
Crozetulus scutatus is endemic to the Western Cape province of South Africa, with an extremely restricted distribution around Table Mountain. The species has been recorded from three cave systems: Table Mountain Bat Caves, Wynberg Caves on Table Mountain, and Muizenberg Boomslang Cave. The species occurs at elevations ranging from 276 to 1,068 metres above sea level.

The species has a very small extent of occurrence.

== Habitat ==
Crozetulus scutatus is a cavernicolous species that inhabits the totally dark zones of caves. The spiders construct small orb webs close to the ground in these permanently dark cave environments.

== Description ==
Crozetulus scutatus is a small spider belonging to the family Anapidae. Both males and females have been described.

== Conservation ==
Crozetulus scutatus is classified as Critically Endangered due to its extremely restricted distribution and small population size. The species is known from only three cave sites within a 12 square kilometre area, all of which fall within Table Mountain National Park, providing some level of protection.

While no specific threats have been identified, recreational caving activities could potentially disturb the species and its cave habitat. Monitoring of caving impacts on the population has been recommended to ensure the species' continued survival.
