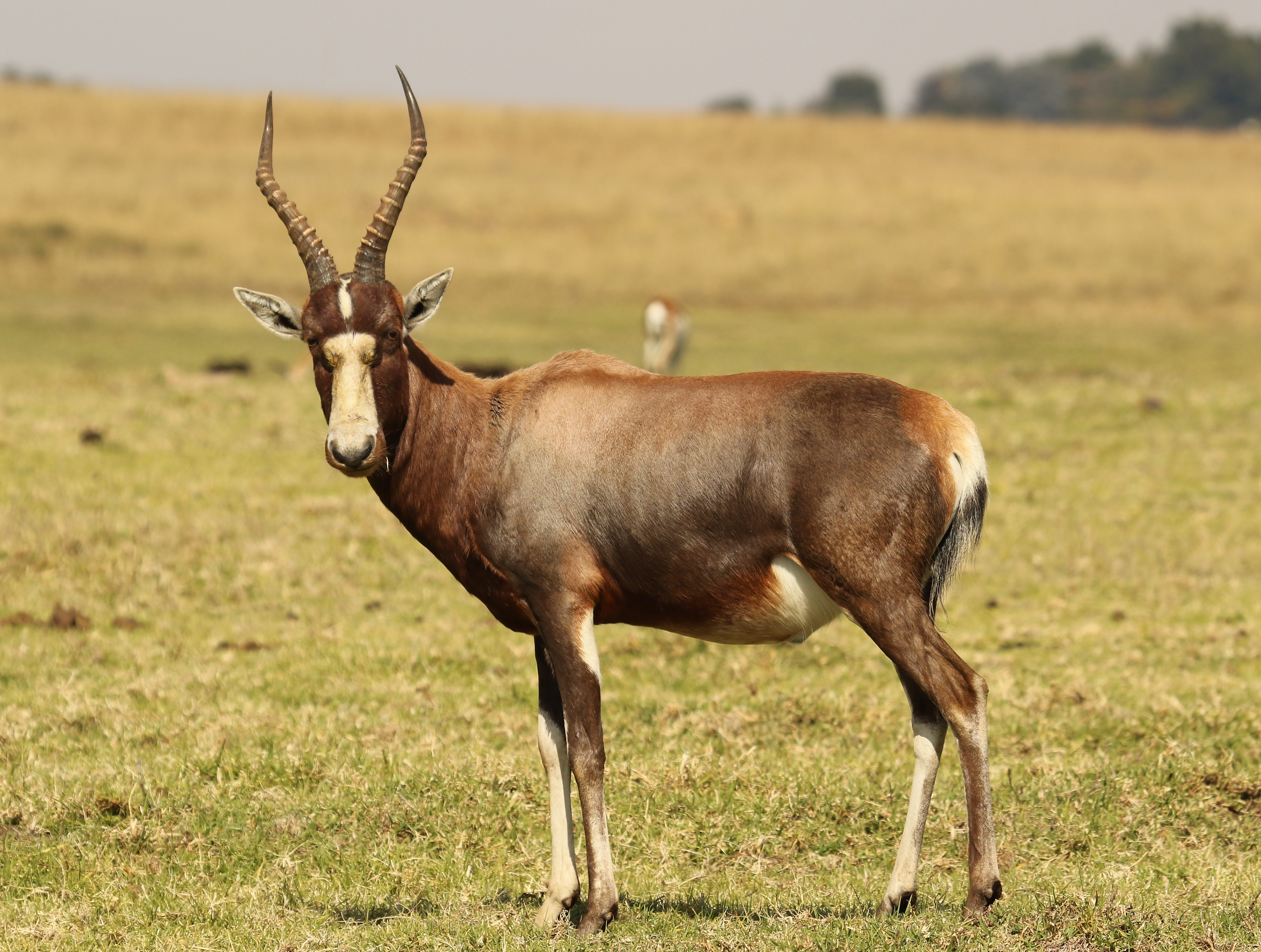
- At Krugersdorp Game Reserve

Conservation status
- Least Concern (IUCN 3.1)

Scientific classification
- Kingdom: Animalia
- Phylum: Chordata
- Class: Mammalia
- Order: Artiodactyla
- Family: Bovidae
- Subfamily: Alcelaphinae
- Genus: Damaliscus
- Species: D. pygargus
- Subspecies: D. p. phillipsi

Trinomial name
- Damaliscus pygargus phillipsi Harper, 1939

Synonyms
- Damaliscus dorcas phillipsi

= Blesbok =

Subspecies of mammal

The blesbok or blesbuck (Damaliscus pygargus phillipsi) is a subspecies of the bontebok antelope endemic to South Africa, Eswatini and Namibia. It has a distinctive white face and forehead, which inspired the name because bles is the Afrikaans (and Dutch language) word for a blaze such as one might see on the forehead of a horse.

== Taxonomy ==
The blesbok and the bontebok (D. p. pygargus) are subspecies of the same species and can readily interbreed, the hybrid offspring being known as the bontebles or baster blesbok; the differences between the two subspecies have arisen due to preferences for different habitats in the wild.

== Distribution ==
The blesbok is endemic to southern Africa and is found in large numbers in all national parks with open grasslands, from the Highveld north of the Vaal River southwards through the Free State, to the Eastern Cape. It is a plains species and dislikes wooded areas. It was first described in the 17th century in bountiful herds.

== Physical description ==
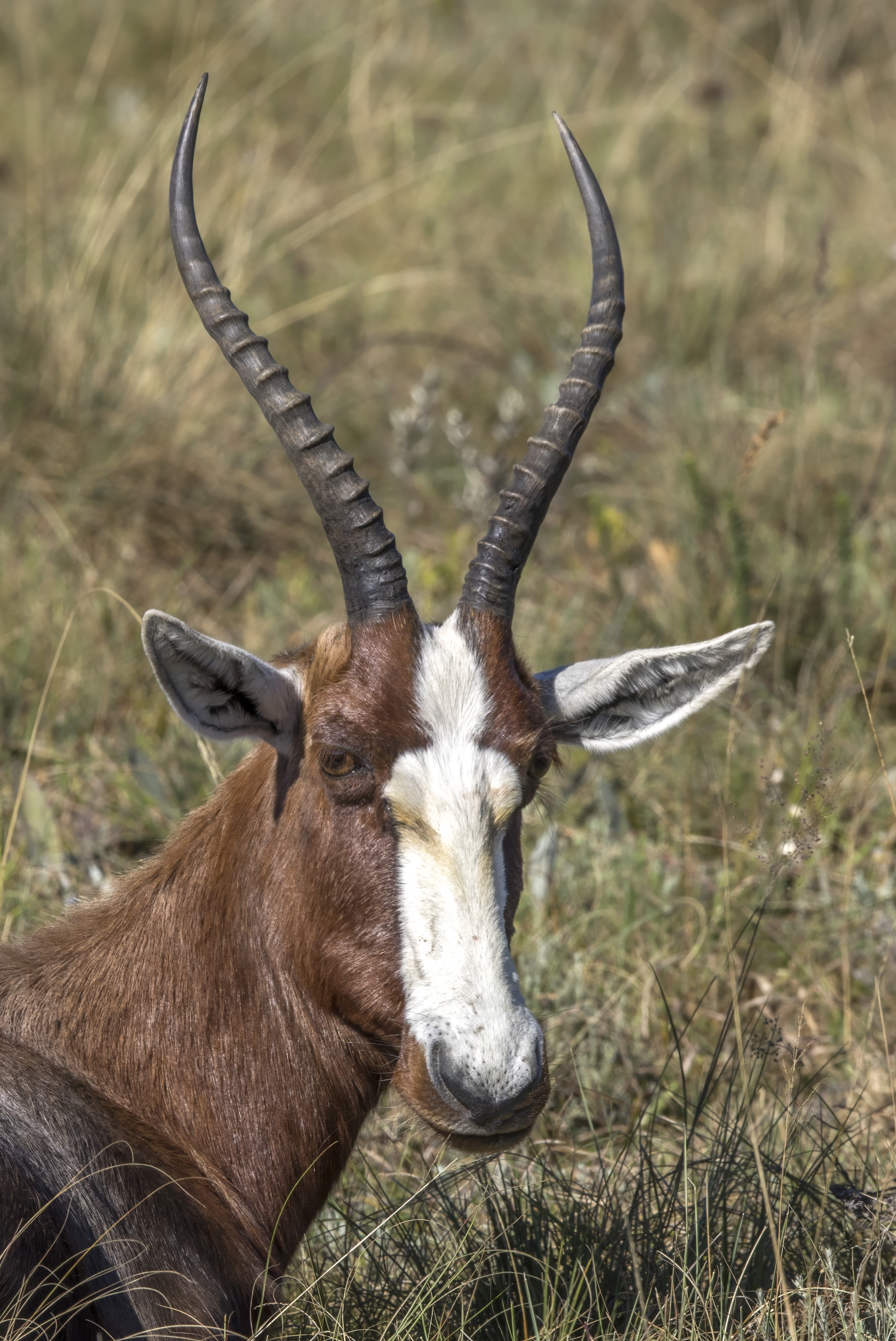
adult

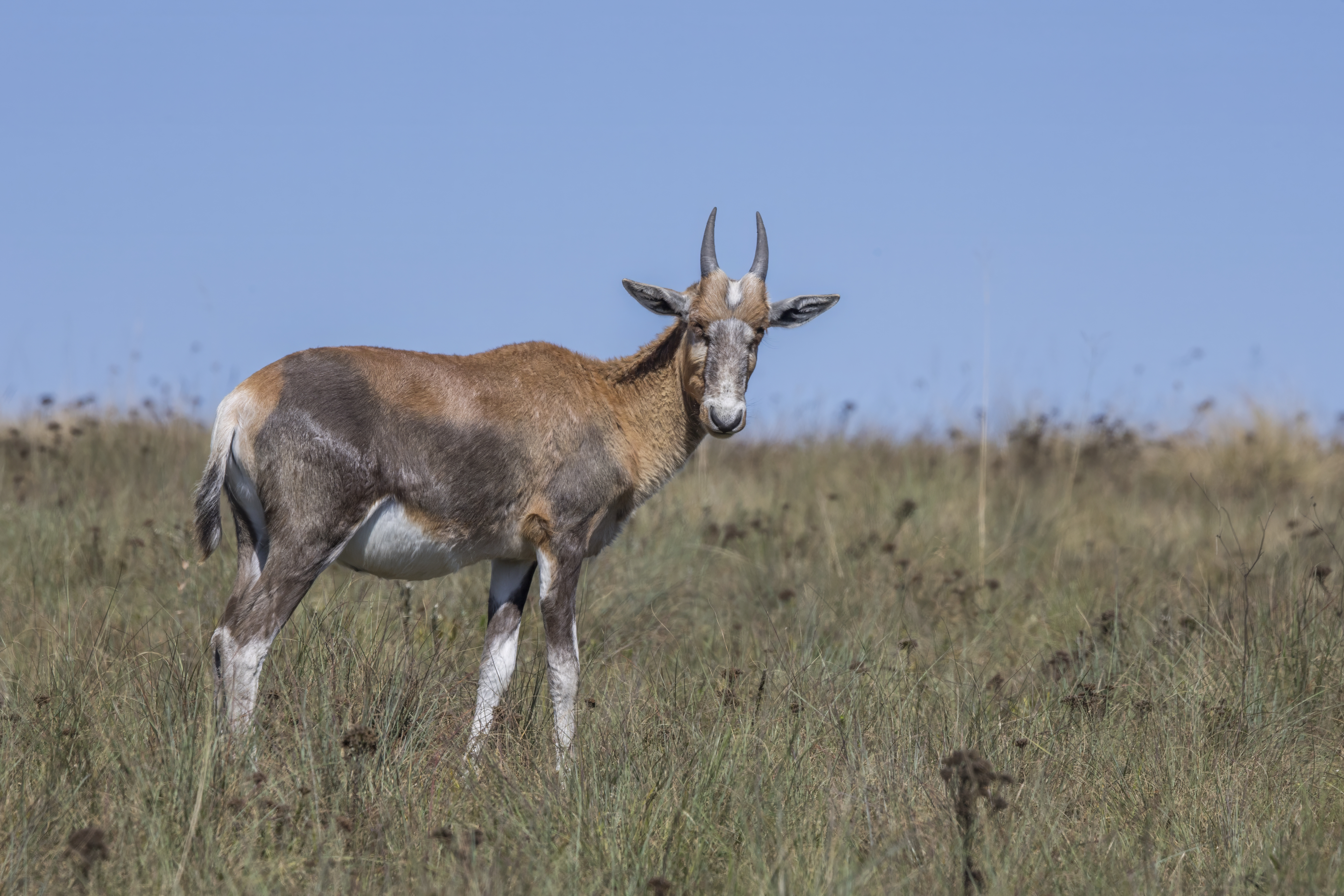
juvenile

Physically, rams and ewes are remarkably similar. Their mass can be as much as 85 kg. A characteristic of the blesbok is the prominent white blaze on the face and a horizontal brown strip that divides this blaze above the eyes. The body is brown with a lighter-coloured saddle on the back and the rump an even lighter shade. The legs are brown, with a white patch behind the top part of the front legs. Lower legs whitish. Both sexes carry horns, ringed almost to the tip. Female horns are slightly more slender. The neck and the top of the back of the blesbok are brown. Lower down on the flanks and buttocks, the coloring becomes darker. The belly, the inside of the buttocks, and the area up to the base of the tail is white. Blesbok can be easily differentiated from other antelopes because they have a distinct white face and forehead. The blesbok differs from the bontebok by having less white on the coat and the blaze on the face, which is usually divided; the coat is also a lighter yellow than the bontebok. The length of their horns averages at around 38 cm. Male adult blesbok average around 70 kg; females average lower, at around 61 kg.

- Body length: 140–160 cm (4.6–5.2 ft)
- Shoulder height: 85–100 cm (2.79–3.28 ft)
- Tail length: 30–45 cm (12–18 in)
- Weight: 55–80 kg (121–176 lb)

== Habitat ==
Blesbok can be found in open veld or plains of South Africa, Eswatini and Namibia. Their preferred habitat is open grassland with water. They often occupy relatively small territories of 2.5 to 6.0 acres in size. They were once one of the most abundant antelope species of the African plains but have become scarce since 1893 due to relentless poaching for their skins and meat. Trophy hunting has helped the blesbok to survive and thrive in the areas where they are hunted legally.

== Reproduction ==
The blesbok is a seasonal breeder, with rutting from March to May. Births peak during November and December after a gestation period of about 240 days (8 months). Females give birth to a single calf per breeding season.

== Status ==
The blesbok was hunted nearly to extinction because of its large numbers, but having been protected since the late 19th century, it has proliferated. Today, it is sufficiently numerous not to be classed as endangered. In modern times, this is largely because of the commercial value of the blesbok to private landowners and because it is one of the few medium-sized antelopes that can be contained by normal stock fencing. As of 2017, blesbok numbers have had an upward trend, and are estimated to be at least 54,000, with about 69% of these thought to be genetically pure. There are at least 17,000 in protected areas. The principal threat is thought to be hybridization with the bontebok.

== Predators and threats ==
Lions, leopards, African wild dogs, spotted hyenas, cheetahs and humans are the blesbok's main predators, while jackals, eagles, and potentially rock pythons and monitor lizards may take unattended calves. Nile crocodiles will catch blesbok opportunistically, if they come to drink at bodies of water where crocodiles reside, or attempt to cross rivers with crocodiles in them.

The blesbok is also farmed and hunted for its skin, meat and for trophies. Blesbok are shy and alert; they rely on speed and endurance to escape predators but tend to return to where they were attacked after a few minutes. When chased, they can maintain a speed of 70 km/h (43 mph) but, like other white-fronted damalisques, blesbok are not good jumpers. They are, however, very good at crawling under things.

== Paleontology ==
Fossil remains of a prehistoric relative, Damaliscus niro, were found in deposits in Sterkfontein. With a weight of approximately 120 kg, it was heavier than the modern blesbok and had slightly different horns. D. niro became extinct at the end of the Pleistocene 12,000 years ago.
