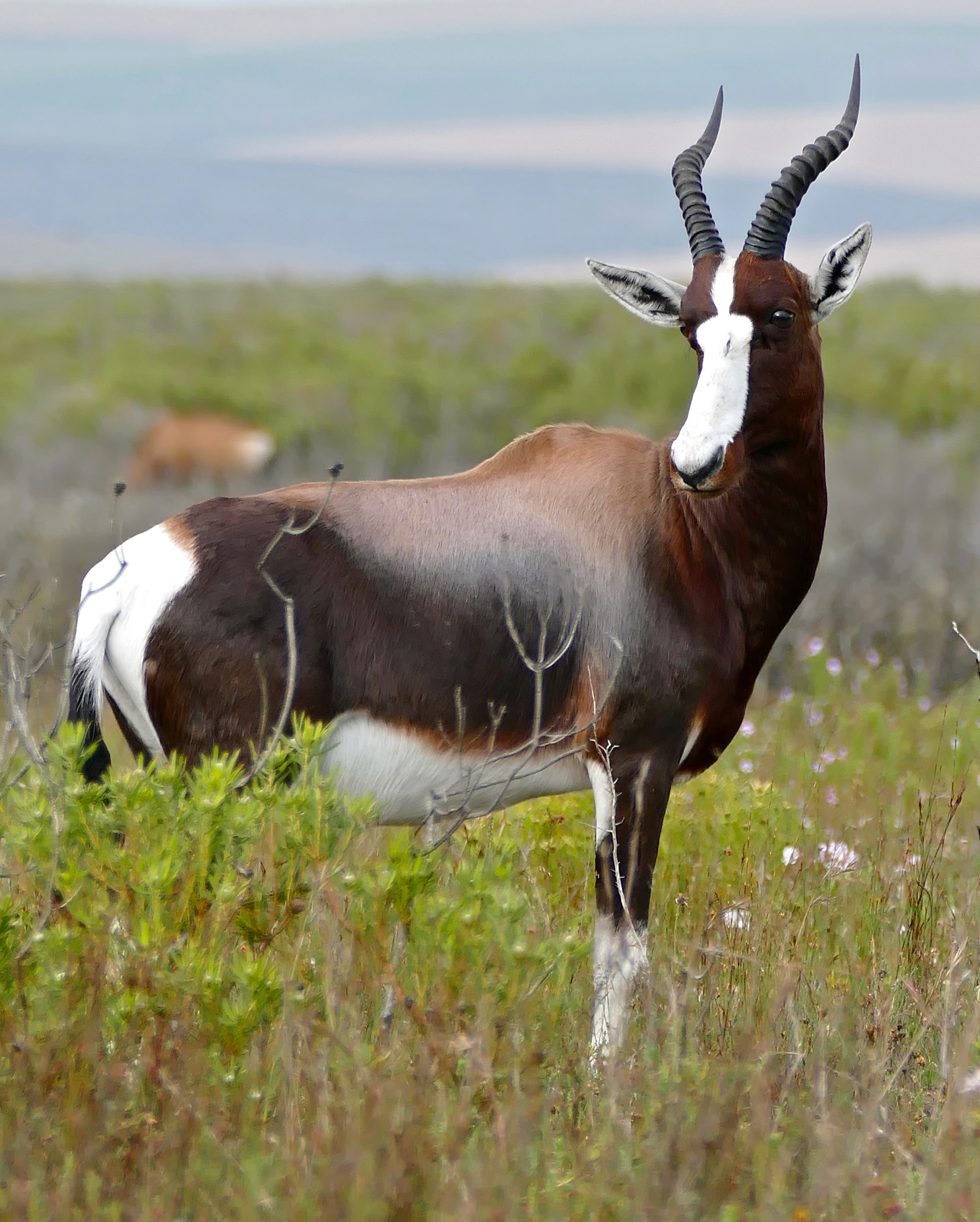
- Bontebok in Bontebok National Park, South Africa

Conservation status
- Vulnerable (IUCN 3.1)
- CITES Appendix II

Scientific classification
- Kingdom: Animalia
- Phylum: Chordata
- Class: Mammalia
- Order: Artiodactyla
- Family: Bovidae
- Subfamily: Alcelaphinae
- Genus: Damaliscus
- Species: D. pygargus

Binomial name
- Damaliscus pygargus (Pallas, 1767)

Subspecies
- D. p. pygargus; D. p. phillipsi
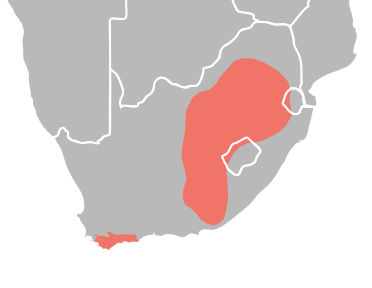
- Damaliscus pygargus distribution

= Bontebok =

Species of mammal

The bontebok (Damaliscus pygargus) is an antelope found in South Africa, Lesotho and Namibia. D. pygargus has two subspecies; the nominate subspecies (D. p. pygargus), occurring naturally in the Fynbos and Renosterveld areas of the Western Cape, and the blesbok (D. p. phillipsi) occurring in the Highveld.

The bontebok is related to the common tsessebe.

== Description ==
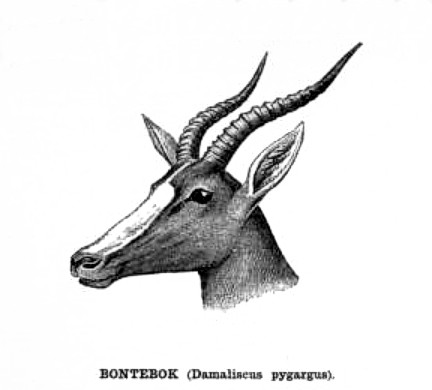
Bontebok head

The bontebok is a tall, medium-sized antelope. They typically stand 0.8 to 1 m (2.6 to 3.3 ft) high at the shoulder and measure 1.2 to 1.6 m (3.9 to 5.2 ft) along the head and body. The tail can range from 30 to 60 cm (12 to 24 in). Body mass can vary from 50 to 68 kg (110 to 150 lb). Males are slightly larger and noticeably heavier than females. The bontebok is a chocolate brown colour, with a white underside and a white stripe from the forehead to the tip of the nose, although there is a brown stripe across the white near the eyes in most blesbok. The bontebok also has a distinctive white patch around its tail (hence the Latin name), while this patch is light brown/tan in the blesbok. The horns of the bontebok are lyre-shaped and clearly ringed. They are found in both sexes and can reach a length of half a metre.

== Habitat ==
Blesbok live in the Highveld, where they eat short grasses, while bontebok are restricted to the coastal Fynbos and the Renosterveld. They are diurnal, though they rest during the heat of the day. Herds may contain only males, only females, or be mixed, and do not exceed 40 animals for bontebok or 70 for blesbok.

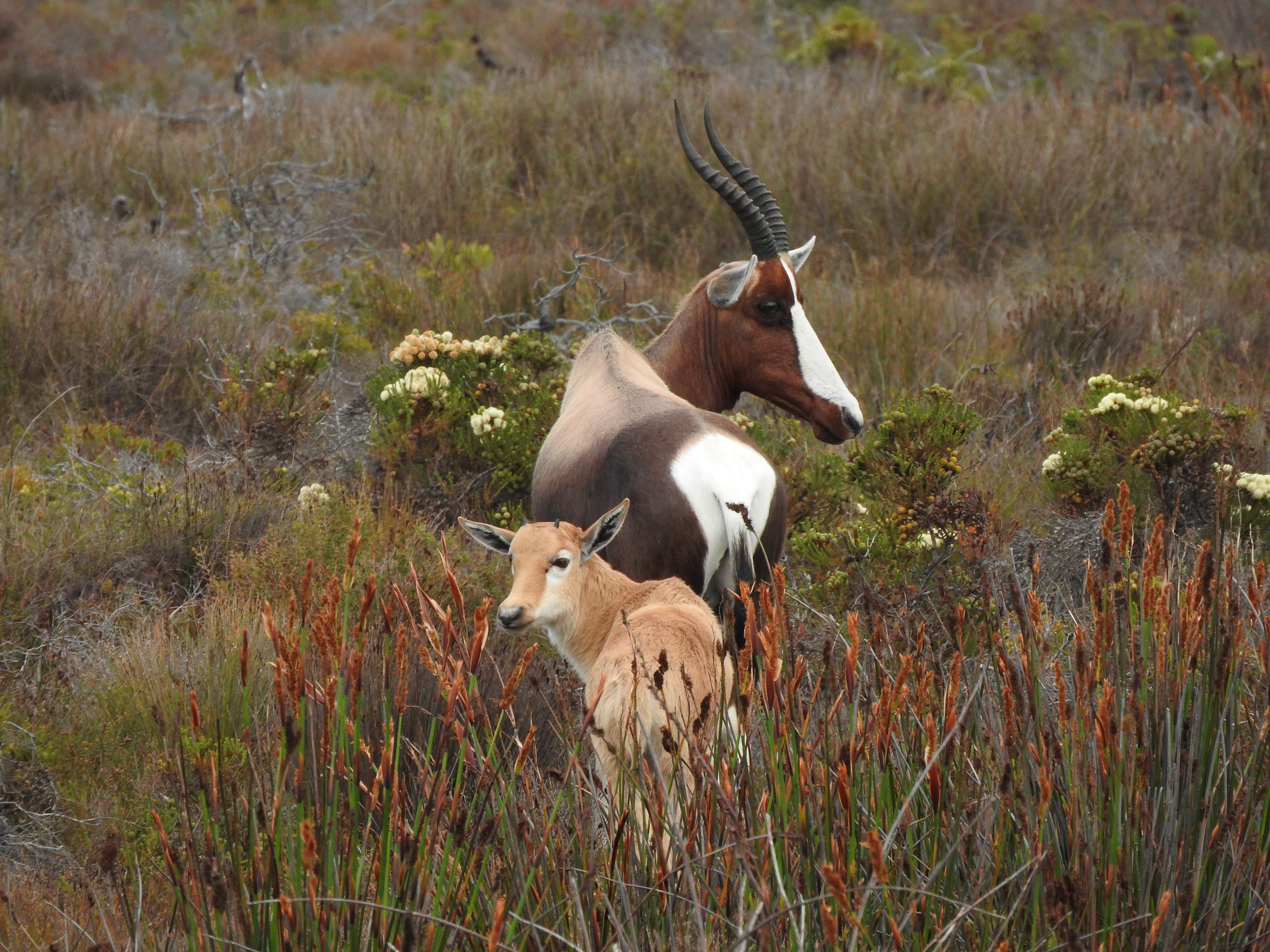
Bontebok with calf in the fynbos

== Behavior ==
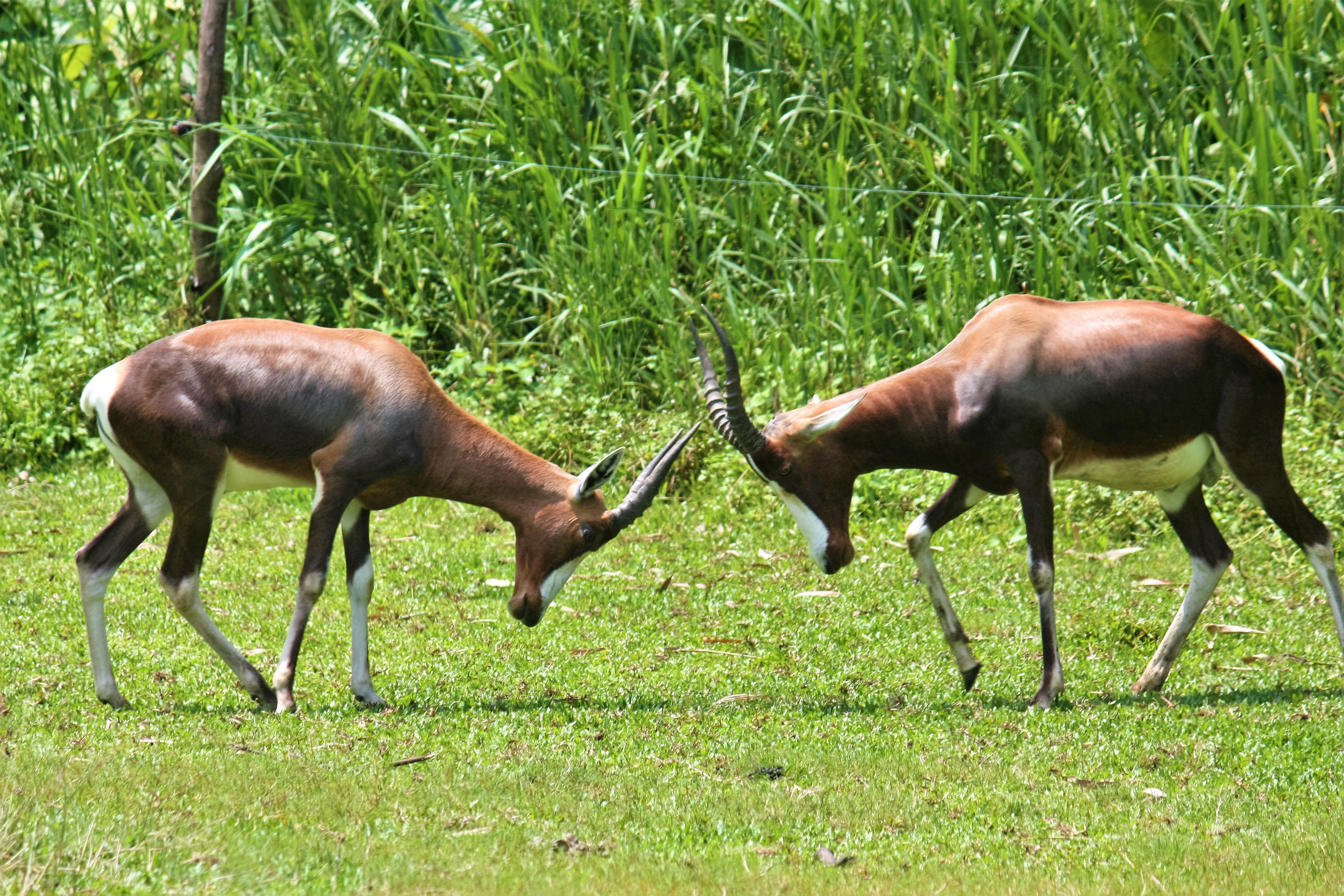
Fighting bontebok

Bontebok are not good jumpers, but they are very good at crawling under obstacles. Mature males establish territories, confront other males in displays, and occasionally fight them.

== Conservation ==
Bontebok were once extensively killed as pests, and by the early 20th century were reduced to a wild population of less than 70 individuals.

Piet Grobler, in his capacity as Minister of Lands, commissioned Deneys Reitz to investigate measures to preserve the species. Reitz identified a tract of land in the district of Bredasdorp where, with the help of Alexander van der Bijl and other farmers, 16 or 17 Bontebok were corralled into a fence, which they were unable to jump out of.

In 1931, this herd of 17 was transferred to Bontebok National Park, which was established for the explicit purpose of conservation of the species. By the time the park was relocated to better suit the needs of the bontebok in 1961, the herd had grown to 61 members. Today, their population is estimated to range from 2,500 to 3,000, all descendants of the original herd of 17 members.

While Bontebok are extinct in their natural habitat, they have increased in population to the point where they are now very abundant and avidly farmed because they are popular quarry for hunters and are easy to sustain.

== In culture ==
The bontebok is the provincial animal of Western Cape.
