= Bontebok National Park =

National park near Swellendam in the Western Cape, South Africa

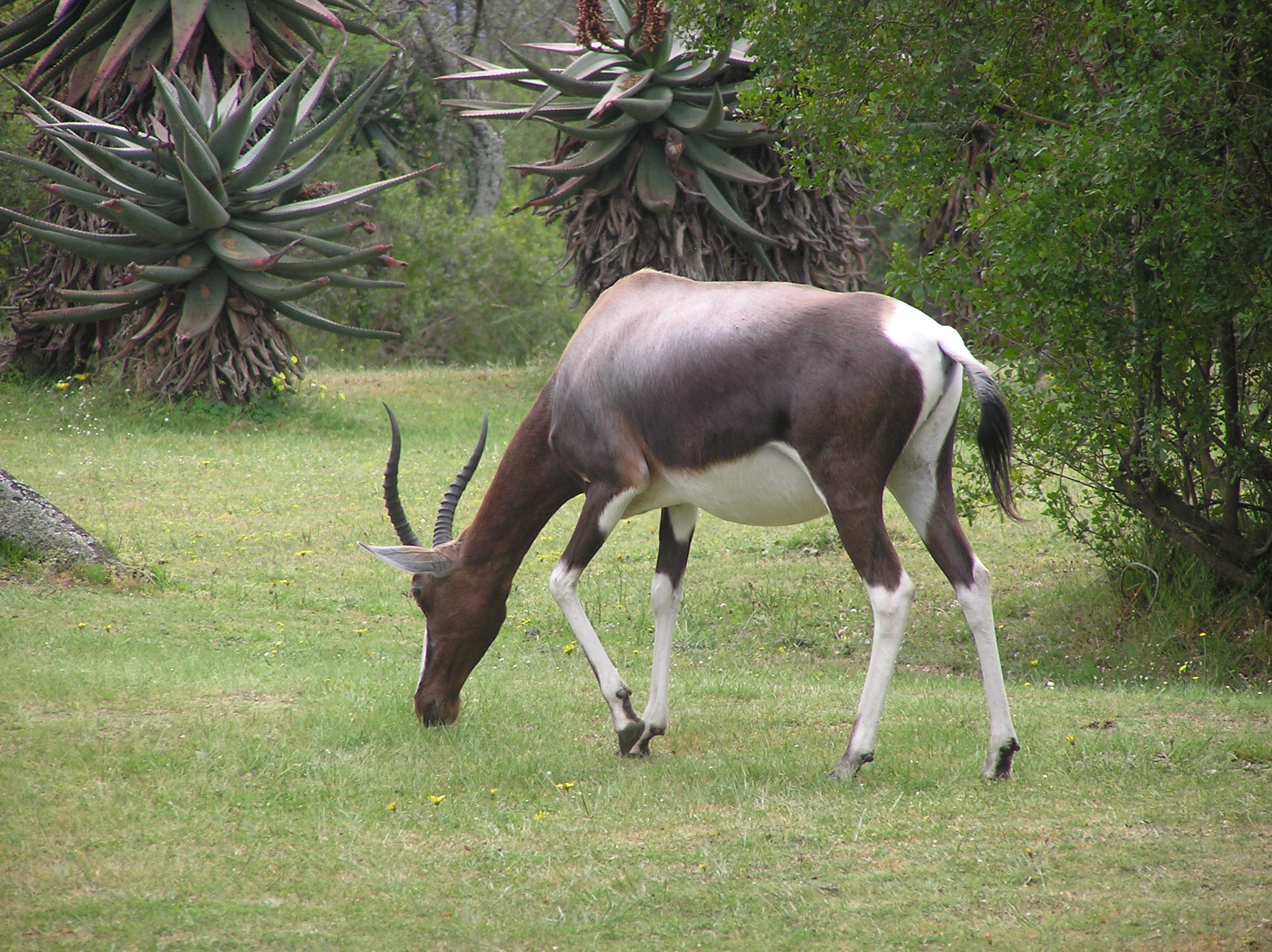
- Bontebok
- Location: Western Cape, South Africa
- Nearest city: Swellendam
- Coordinates: 34°04′S 20°27′E
- Area: 27.86 km^{2} (10.76 sq mi)
- Established: 1931
- Governing body: South African National Parks
- Website: www.sanparks.org/parks/bontebok
- Bontebok National Park (South Africa)

Bontebok National Park is a species-specific national park in South Africa. It was established in 1931 to ensure the preservation of the bontebok. It is the smallest of South Africa's 19 National Parks, covering an area of 27.86 km^{2}. The park is part of the Cape Floristic Region, which is a World Heritage Site.

The park is located 6 km south of Swellendam, in the foothills of the Langeberg Mountains. It is bordered to the south by the Breede River.

== The bontebok ==
Bonteboks are rare, unusually marked antelopes. They are listed as vulnerable in Appendix II of the International Trade in Endangered Species Red List. They are endemic to the Cape Floral area, and once roamed the region in large numbers. European settlement and hunting brought the animal to near extinction by the early 19th century. A relict population was protected on private farmland. In 1931, seventeen members of this population were translocated to the first Bontebok National Park. In the 1960s, half of the population died from worm infestations, copper deficiency and related syndromes. In 1961, 61 members of the surviving population were translocated to the current Bontebok National Park. The worldwide bontebok population of 2,500–3,000 individuals are all derived from this population.

However, there are only about 200 bontebok in the park, as this is the maximum number a park of its size can support without inflicting serious damage to plant life. Over the years the park's surplus stock has been translocated to other nature reserves and private owners with suitable habitats.

== Other species found in the park ==
Conservation in the park include the protection of the endangered fynbos veld type and the coastal renosterveld, one of the largest remaining "renosterveld islands", which contains several plant species that are found nowhere else in the world. In total, the park has nearly 500 grasses and other plant species.

Other indigenous species in the park include the African leopard, African clawless otter, Denham's bustard, Secretary bird and the Blue crane, South Africa's national bird. Grey Rhebok, Cape Grysbok, Steenbok, Grey Duiker, Caracal, Red Hartebeest and Cape Mountain Zebra can also be found here. There are over 200 species of birds.

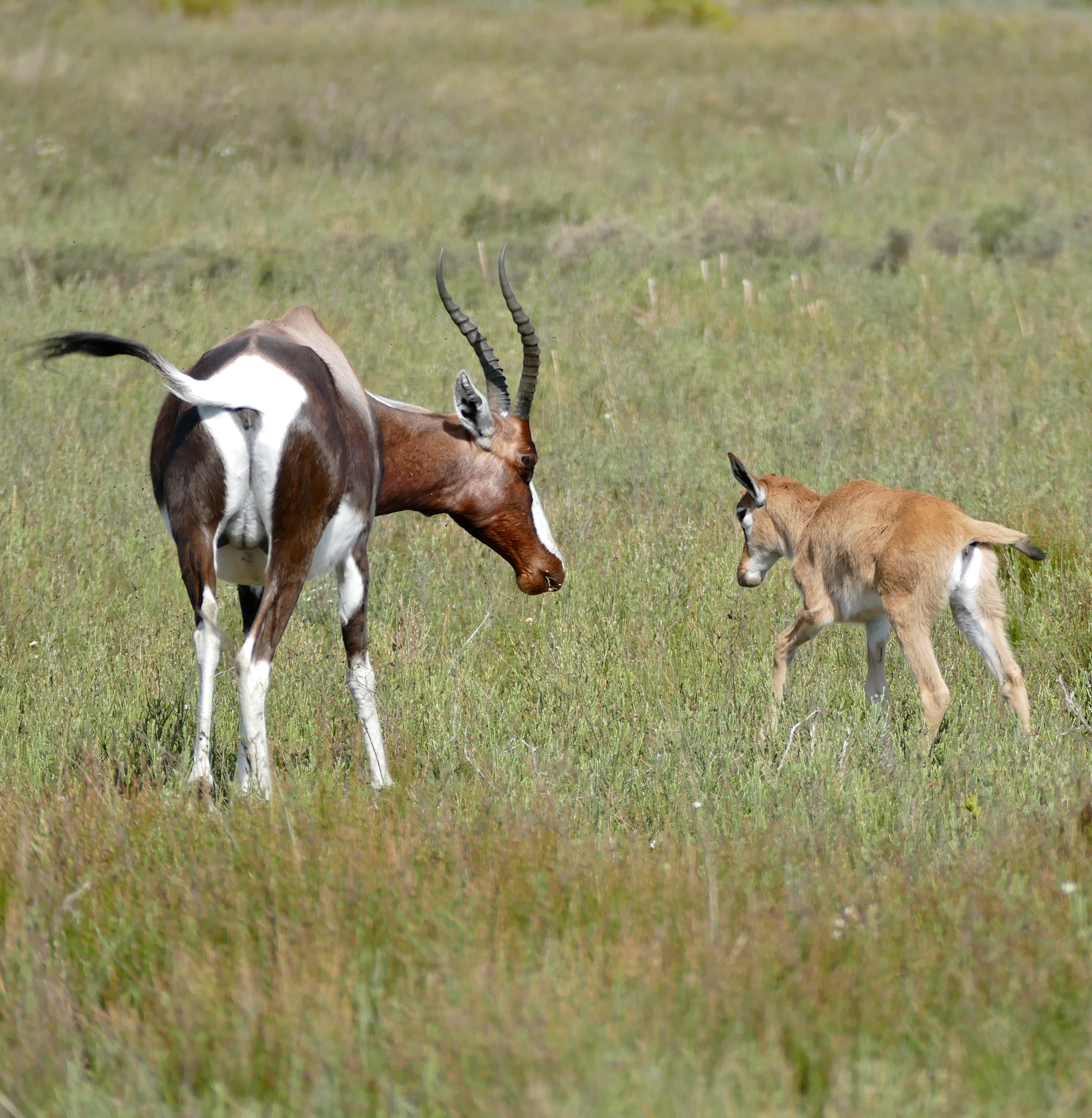
Bontebok female and young

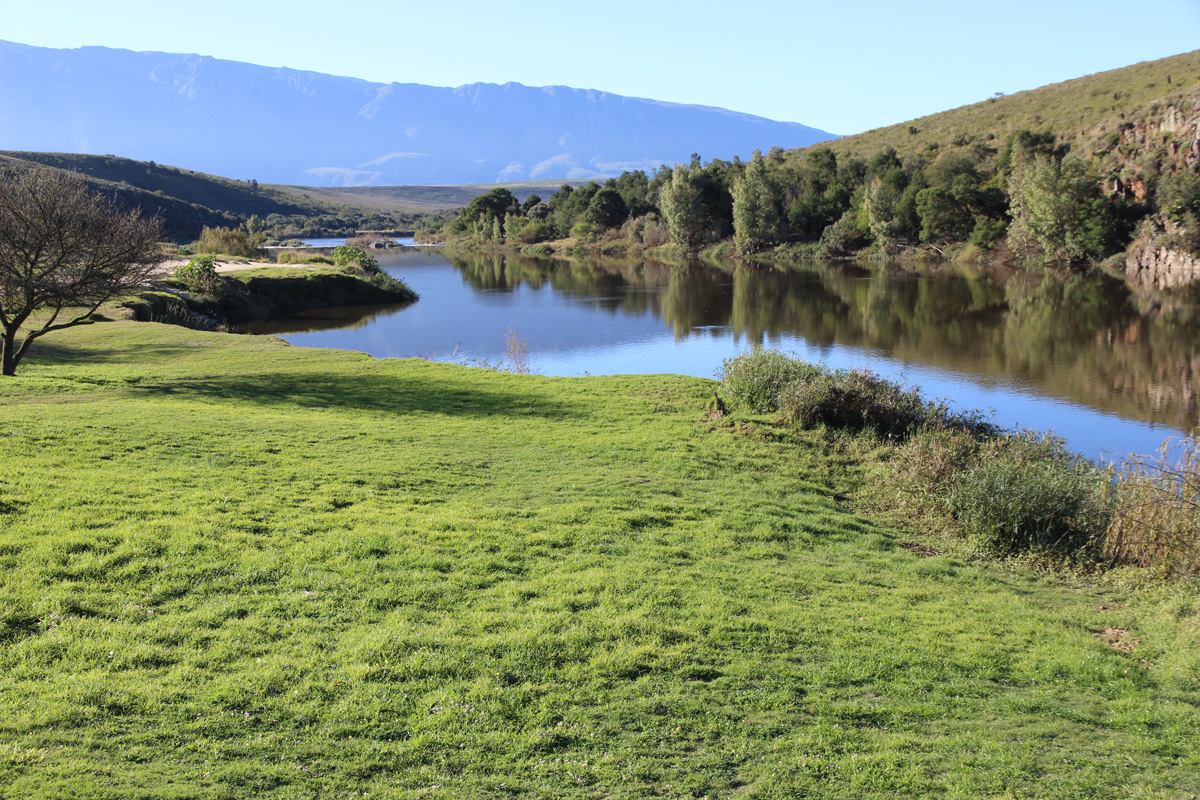
Breede River in the park

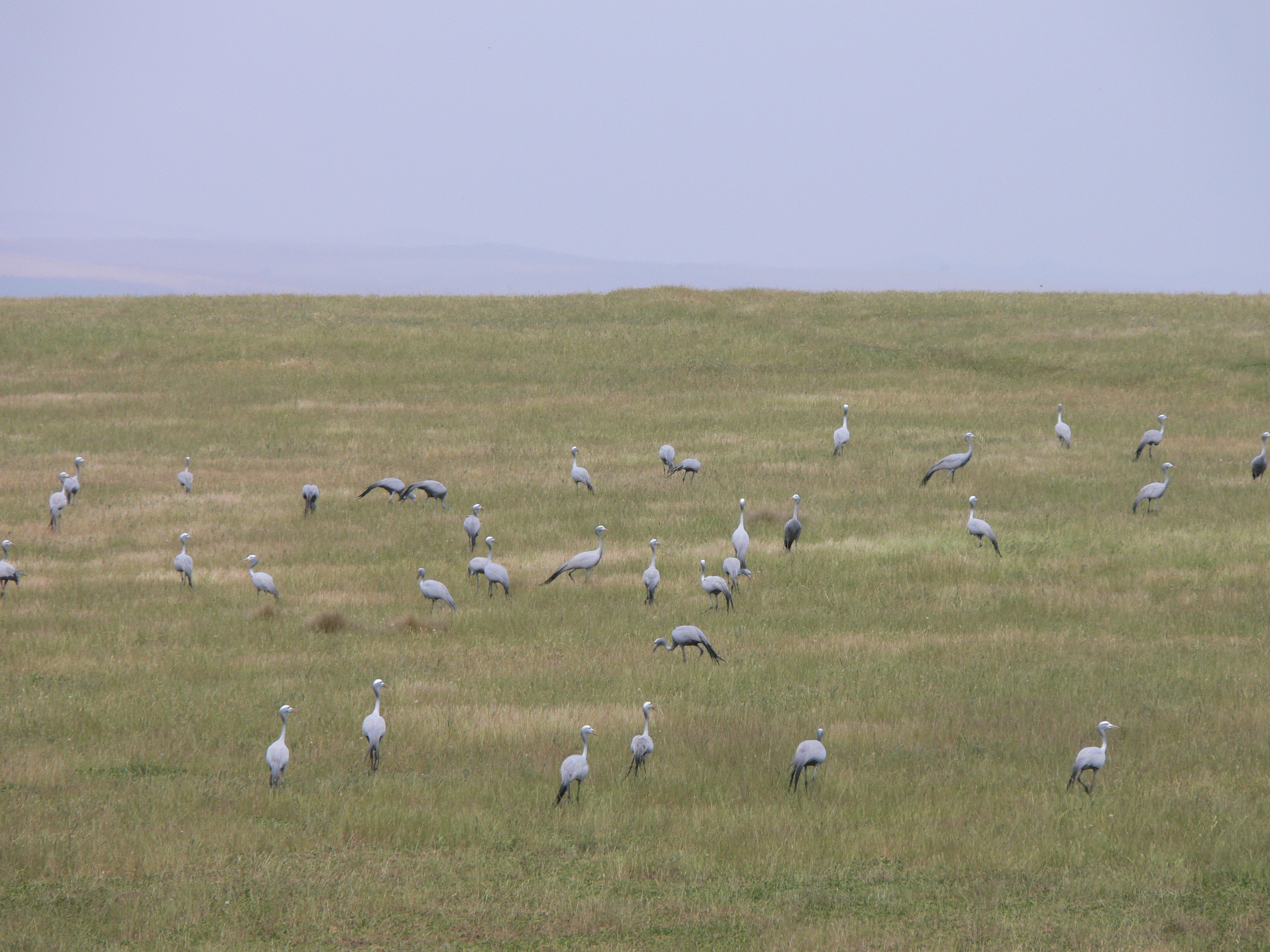
Blue Crane

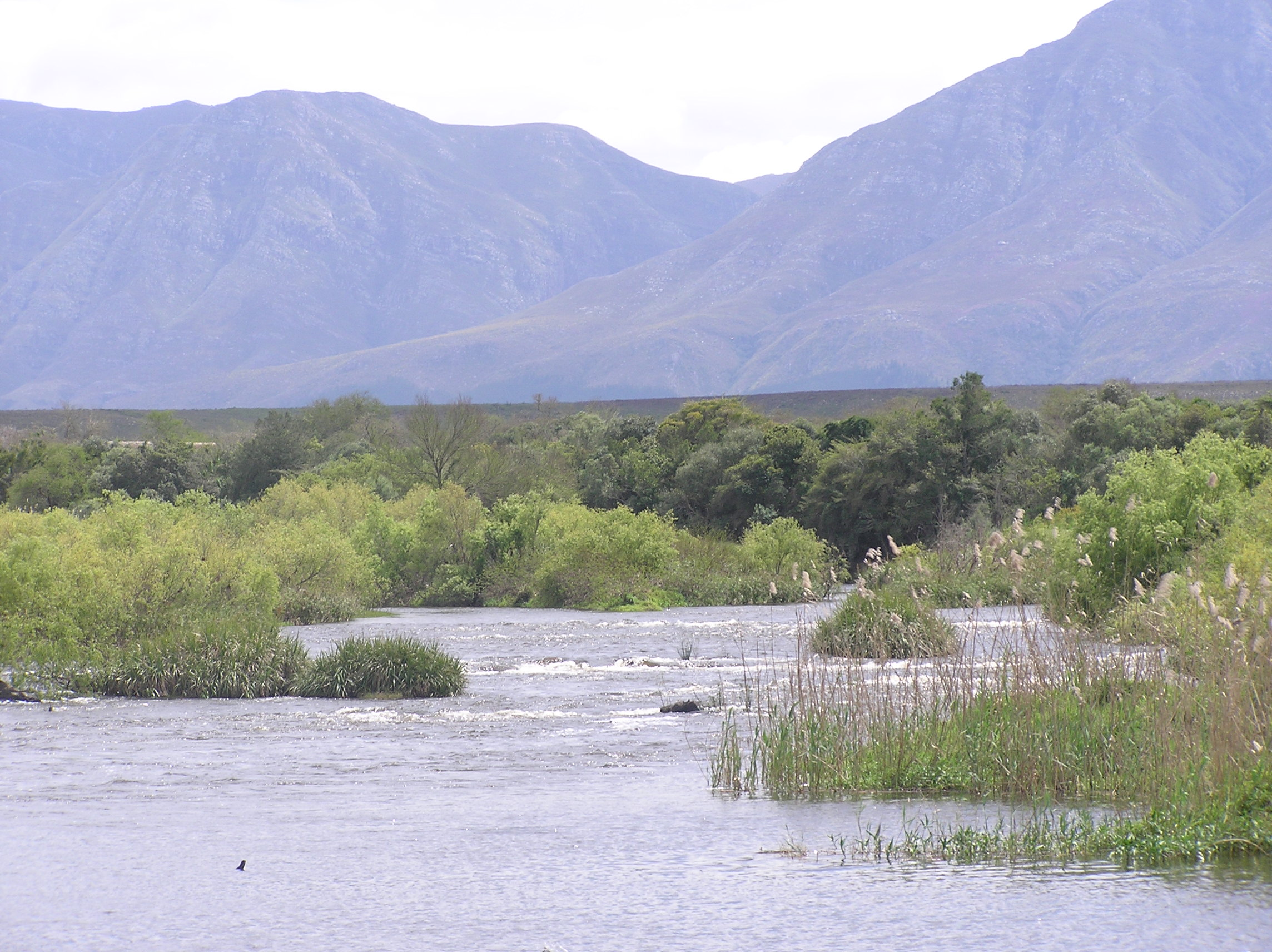
Breede River with Langeberge in the distance.

== Activities in the Park ==
Bontebok National Park lacks major predators or other large dangerous animals, and thus allows several outdoor activities. These include self-navigated game drives, a large picnic area, fishing, swimming and kayaking on the Breede River, mountain biking (along reserve's gravel roads, or a dedicated 9 km MTB trail) and several marked walking/hiking trails.

=== Trails ===
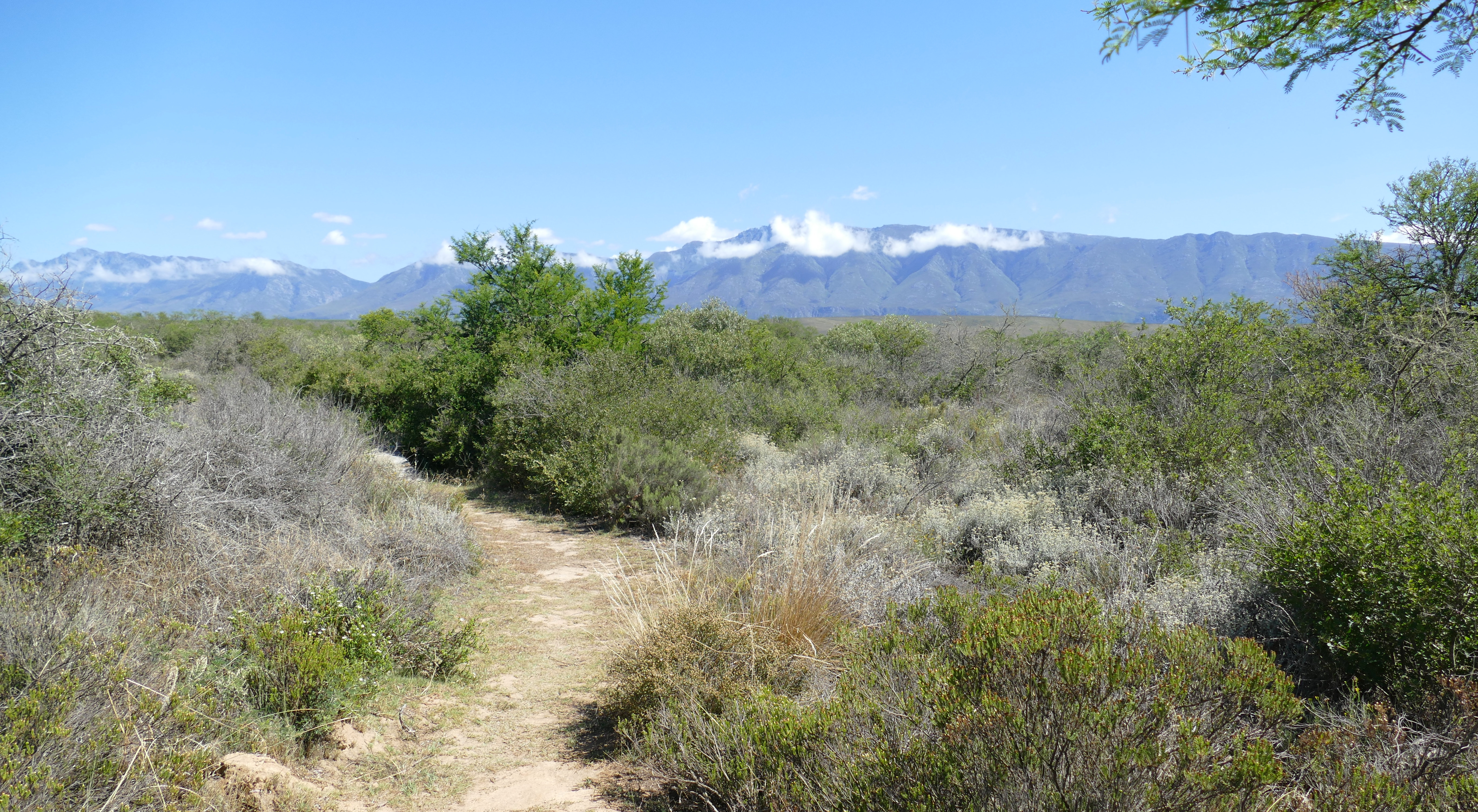
Acacia Trail with the Langeberg in the background

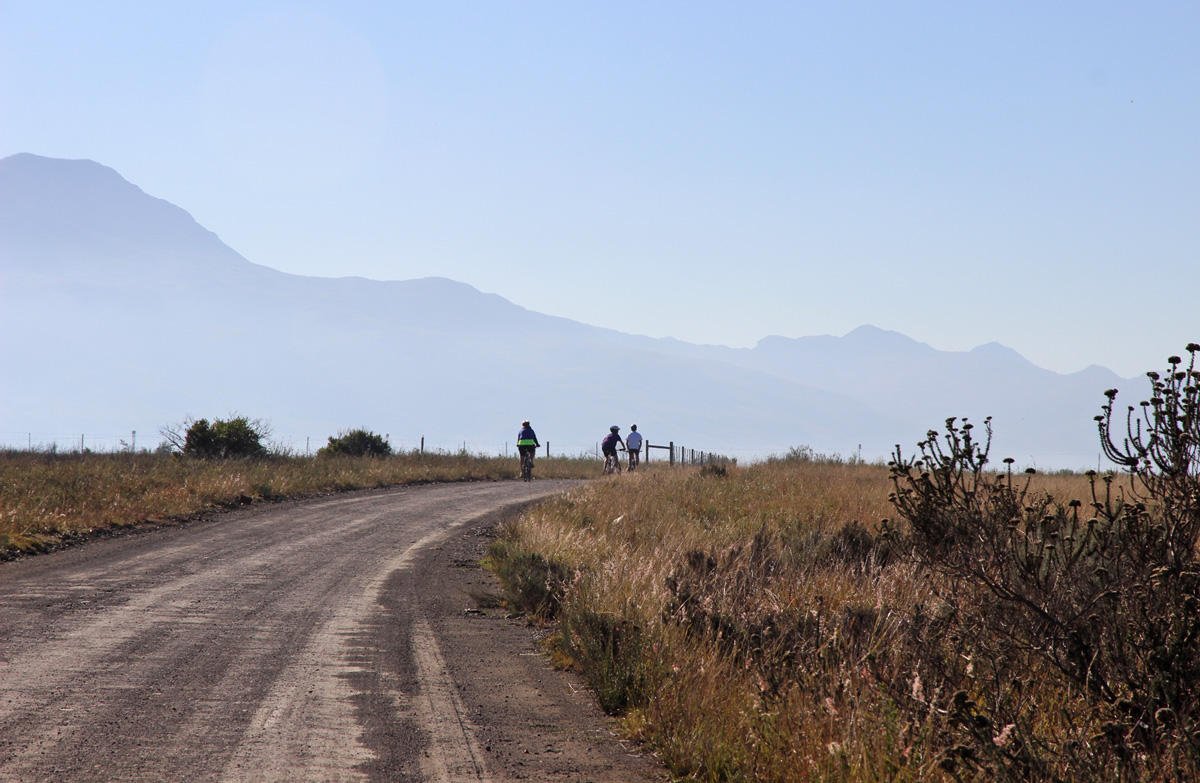
Cycling in the park

Three hiking trails start near the rest camp (accessible for day visitors from a dedicated parking area, or via a short link path from the overnight camp):

- The Acacia Trail is a circular route of approximately 1.6 km which is mostly flat, circling through acacia veldt
- The Aloe Hill Trail is a circular route of approximately 3.3 km (2.7 km if leaving from the rest camp) which passes the original building of Lang Elsie's Kraal (c. 1734-1800) before climbing a small hill, returning along the river with a few easy rocky scrambles
- The Bushbuck Trail, a 5.4 km out-and-return route along the river from the trailhead to Die Stroom (the picnic area) and return

Further inland from the river, the Blue Crane Trail is a 3.2 km route along a jeep track, passing some of the small dams. A fifth circular trail of about 6 km, the Termite Loop, commences near Die Stroom and climbs a long gentle incline before crossing Western Drive and descending back to the river.

=== Birding ===
The park is a good location for birding, with over 200 species recorded. Large species commonly see here are the Denham's bustard, blue crane, spur-winged goose and secretarybird. Other noteworthy species are malachite and southern double-collared sunbird, fiscal flycatcher, Klaas's cuckoo, acacia pied barbet, red-faced mousebird and pearl-breasted swallow.

Day visitors can access all areas of the park except for the Lang Elsies Kraal Rest Camp. However, a dedicated picnic area at Die Stroom has ablutions, braai (barbecue) facilities, a children's play area, and access to the river to swim, fish or kayak.

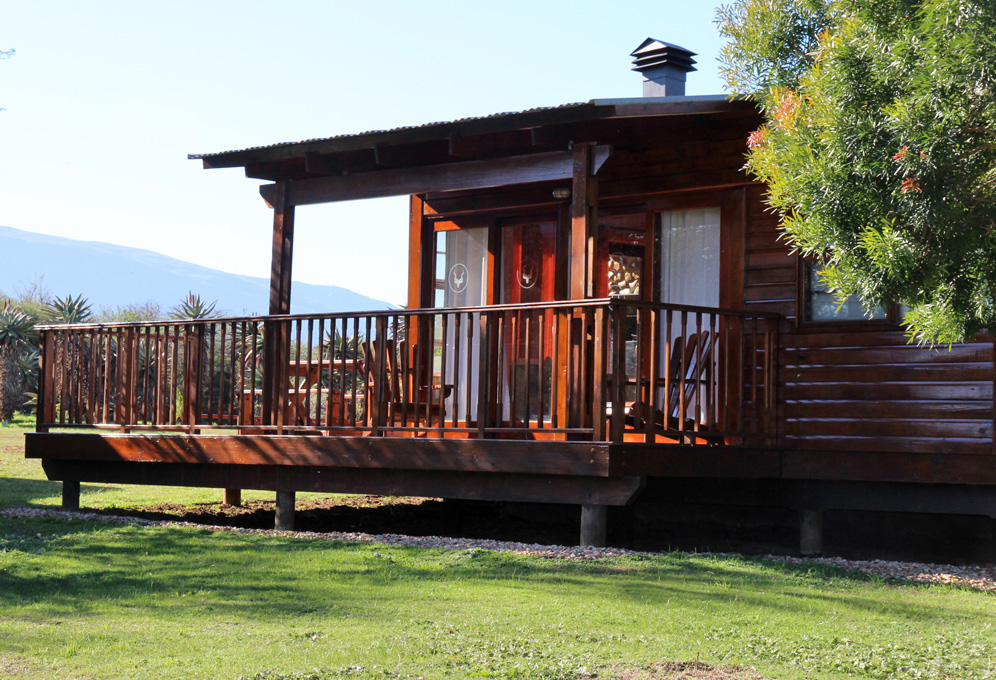
Cabin in the park

== Accommodation in the park ==
All accommodation is located at the Lang Elsie's Kraal Rest Camp, on the banks of the Breede River. Fourteen one- and two-bedroom wooden cottages are complemented by multiple camping stands, available with or without electricity points. Stands suitable for caravans are also available. All accommodation booking is through SANParks.
