= Zealanapis insula =

Conservation status
- Data Deficit (NZ TCS)

Scientific classification
- Kingdom: Animalia
- Phylum: Arthropoda
- Subphylum: Chelicerata
- Class: Arachnida
- Order: Araneae
- Infraorder: Araneomorphae
- Family: Anapidae
- Genus: Zealanapis
- Species: Z. insula

Binomial name
- Zealanapis insula Platnick & Forster, 1989

Species of spiders

Zealanapis insula is a species of Anapidae that is endemic to New Zealand.

== Taxonomy ==
This species was described in 1989 by Norman Platnick and Ray Forster from male and female specimens collected on the Noises Islands. The holotype is stored in the New Zealand Arthropod Collection under registration number NZAC03014954.

== Description ==
The male is recorded at 1.02mm in length whereas the female is 1.03mm.

== Distribution ==
This species is only known from Motuhoropapa Island in the Noises, New Zealand.

== Conservation status ==
Under the New Zealand Threat Classification System, this species is listed as "Data Deficient" with the qualifiers of "Data Poor: Size", "Data Poor: Trend" and "One Location".
