= Ahaaha Rocks =

Island in New Zealand

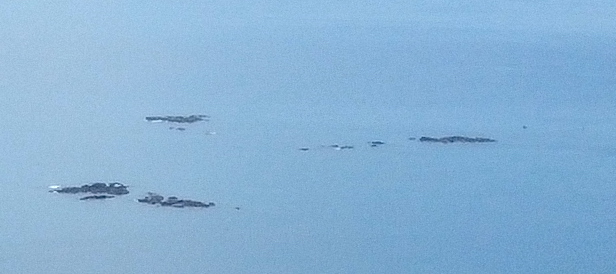
- Interactive map of Ahaaha Rocks

Geography
- Coordinates: 36.690444°S 175.024444°E

Administration
- New Zealand
- Region: Auckland

Demographics
- Population: uninhabited

Ahaaha Rocks or Ahaaha Islets are small islands in the Hauraki Gulf of Auckland, New Zealand. It is part of a collection of islands known as The Noises northeast of Rakino Island.

== Description ==
Also known as the Ahaaha Islets, the islands are 3.62 km (2.25 mi) east of the Motuhoropapa Island. The Ahaaha Rocks are approximately 1.2 m (3.9 ft) high near another outcropping called David Rocks. The Ahaaha Rocks are surrounded by a 0.4 km (0.25 mi) reef. They are small islands located in the Hauraki Gulf of the Auckland region in New Zealand.

== History ==
They are part of a chain of islands and other rock stacks which are known as the Noises. They are thought to be 130 million years old. Ahaaha is one of the smaller islands and rocky reefs of the Noises. On September 21, 1973 a large wooden motor yacht named the Rangiora collided with the Ahaaha Rocks which created a hole in the ship. Ten people were rescued from the sinking vessel. New Zealand Police, Royal New Zealand Coastguard, and two commercial ships were able to rescue the crew and passengers before it sank. The yacht was holed, but was refloated and repaired.

== Marine life ==
The Ahaaha Rocks is a rocky reef with a large variety of marine life including goatfish, snapper, and spotty. Consequently, it is reputed to be "another hot-bed for the Auckland boating populace" with Kingfish also being common. The area contains spiny kelp or leather kelp known as Ecklonia radiata and the area around Ahaaha is a sponge habitat.

The COVID-19 lockdown resulted in an enforced ban on recreational vessels. An observed increase in dolphin and fish communication ranges was discovered in many areas, including the Ahaaha Rocks.

It is an occasional destination for intrepid sea kayakers.
