= Dictyomeridium lueckingii =

Scientific classification
- Domain: Eukaryota
- Kingdom: Fungi
- Division: Ascomycota
- Class: Dothideomycetes
- Order: Trypetheliales
- Family: Trypetheliaceae
- Genus: Dictyomeridium
- Species: D. lueckingii

Binomial name
- Dictyomeridium lueckingii Flakus & Aptroot (2016)

Species of lichen

Dictyomeridium lueckingii is a species of corticolous (bark-dwelling) lichen in the family Trypetheliaceae. Found in Bolivia, it was formally described as a new species in 2016 by Adam Flakus and André Aptroot. The type specimen was collected by the first author from Entre Ríos near Soledad (Burdett O'Connor Province) at an elevation of 1,700 m (5,600 ft). It is only known to occur at the type locality, in the Tucumano-Boliviano montane forest. The species epithet honours German lichenologist Robert Lücking, "for his magnificent contribution to the knowledge of tropical lichens, on the occasion of his 50th birthday".

== Description ==
Identifying features of Dictyomeridium lueckingi include an ecorticate and somewhat pruinose thallus, pyriform, partially-immersed, single, black and white-pruinose ascomata with eccentric, beaked ostioles, a distinct hamathecium, hyaline, amyloid, small somewhat muriform ascospores, and the occurrence of the lichen product lichexanthone. The latter substance causes the thallus and ascomata surface to fluoresce yellow when lit with a long-wavelength UV light. Its ascospores are somewhat muriform (divided into locules with 5–6 transverse septa and 1–2 longitudinal septa), and measure 25–35 by 12–17 μm. The morphologically similar species D. proponens and D. paraproponens can be distinguished from D. lueckingii by their larger spores.
