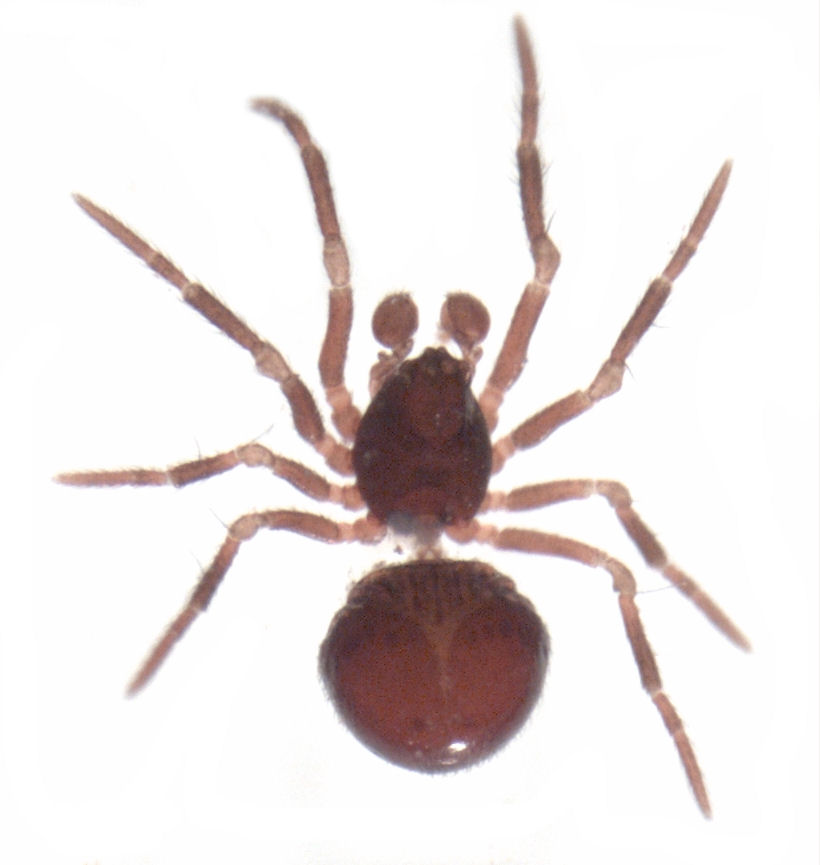
- male Zealanapis sp

Scientific classification
- Kingdom: Animalia
- Phylum: Arthropoda
- Subphylum: Chelicerata
- Class: Arachnida
- Order: Araneae
- Infraorder: Araneomorphae
- Family: Anapidae
- Genus: Zealanapis; Platnick & Forster, 1989

Type species
- Z. armata (Forster, 1951)

Species
- 10, see text

= Zealanapis =

Genus of spiders

Zealanapis is a genus of South Pacific araneomorph spiders in the family Anapidae, first described by Norman I. Platnick & Raymond Robert Forster in 1989.

== Species ==
As of October 2026 it contains ten species, all found in New Zealand:

- Zealanapis armata (Forster, 1951) – New Zealand
- Zealanapis australis (Forster, 1951) – New Zealand
- Zealanapis conica (Forster, 1951) – New Zealand
- Zealanapis insula Platnick & Forster, 1989 – New Zealand
- Zealanapis kuscheli Platnick & Forster, 1989 – New Zealand
- Zealanapis matua Platnick & Forster, 1989 – New Zealand
- Zealanapis montana Platnick & Forster, 1989 – New Zealand
- Zealanapis otago Platnick & Forster, 1989 – New Zealand
- Zealanapis punta Platnick & Forster, 1989 – New Zealand
- Zealanapis waipoua Platnick & Forster, 1989 – New Zealand
