= Zealanapis matua =

Conservation status
- Not Threatened (NZ TCS)

Scientific classification
- Kingdom: Animalia
- Phylum: Arthropoda
- Subphylum: Chelicerata
- Class: Arachnida
- Order: Araneae
- Infraorder: Araneomorphae
- Family: Anapidae
- Genus: Zealanapis
- Species: Z. matua

Binomial name
- Zealanapis matua Platnick & Forster, 1989

Species of spiders

Zealanapis matua is a species of Anapidae that is endemic to New Zealand.

== Taxonomy ==
This species was described in 1989 by Norman Platnick and Ray Forster from male and female specimens collected on Secretary Island. The holotype is stored in Otago Museum.

== Description ==
The male is recorded at 0.84mm in length whereas the female is 0.96mm.

== Distribution ==
This species is only known from Fiordland, New Zealand.

== Conservation status ==
Under the New Zealand Threat Classification System, this species is listed as "Not Threatened".
