= Dictyomeridium neureuterae =

Scientific classification
- Domain: Eukaryota
- Kingdom: Fungi
- Division: Ascomycota
- Class: Dothideomycetes
- Order: Trypetheliales
- Family: Trypetheliaceae
- Genus: Dictyomeridium
- Species: D. neureuterae

Binomial name
- Dictyomeridium neureuterae A.J.Marshall, Aptroot, de Lange et Blanchon (2024)

Species of lichen

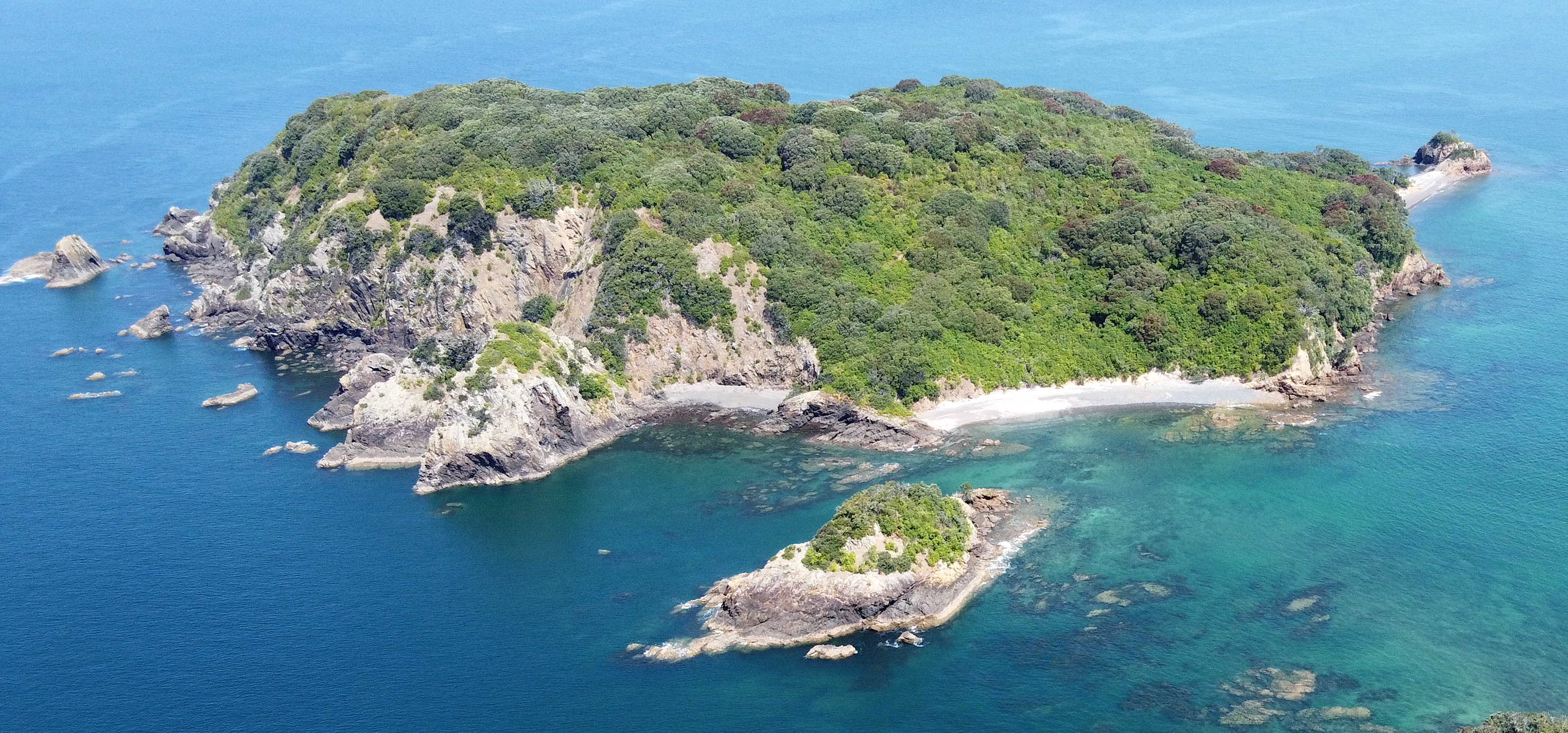
As of 2024, the species has only been found on Ōtata Island in the Noises

Dictyomeridium neureuterae is a species of corticolous (bark-dwelling) lichen in the family Trypetheliaceae. Found on Ōtata Island in the Noises group of islands in the Hauraki Gulf of New Zealand, it was formally described as a new species in 2024. The lichen has been found on the bark of Pseudopanax lessonii.

== Description ==
Dictyomeridium neureuterae is corticolous, and has a crustose thallus. It is whitish-green in colour while alive, which becomes pale brown when stored. The species can be distinguished from other members of Dictyomeridium due to the presence of a UV- thallus, no ostiolar pigment, non-amyloid and I- ascospores in the sie range of 25–42 × 10–20 μm, asci containing eight spores and prominent ascomata.

== Taxonomy and etymology ==
The species was described in 2024 by Andrew J. Marshall, André Aptroot, Peter de Lange and Dan Blanchon. The type specimen was collected by Andrew J. Marshall from Ōtata Island in the Noises in January 2021, and is held at the Unitec Institute of Technology herbarium. The species epithet honours naturalist Sue Neureuter, who is one of the custodians of The Noises islands group.

== Distribution and habitat ==
Currently, the species is only known to occur on Ōtata Island in the Noises, on the bark of Pseudopanax lessonii.
