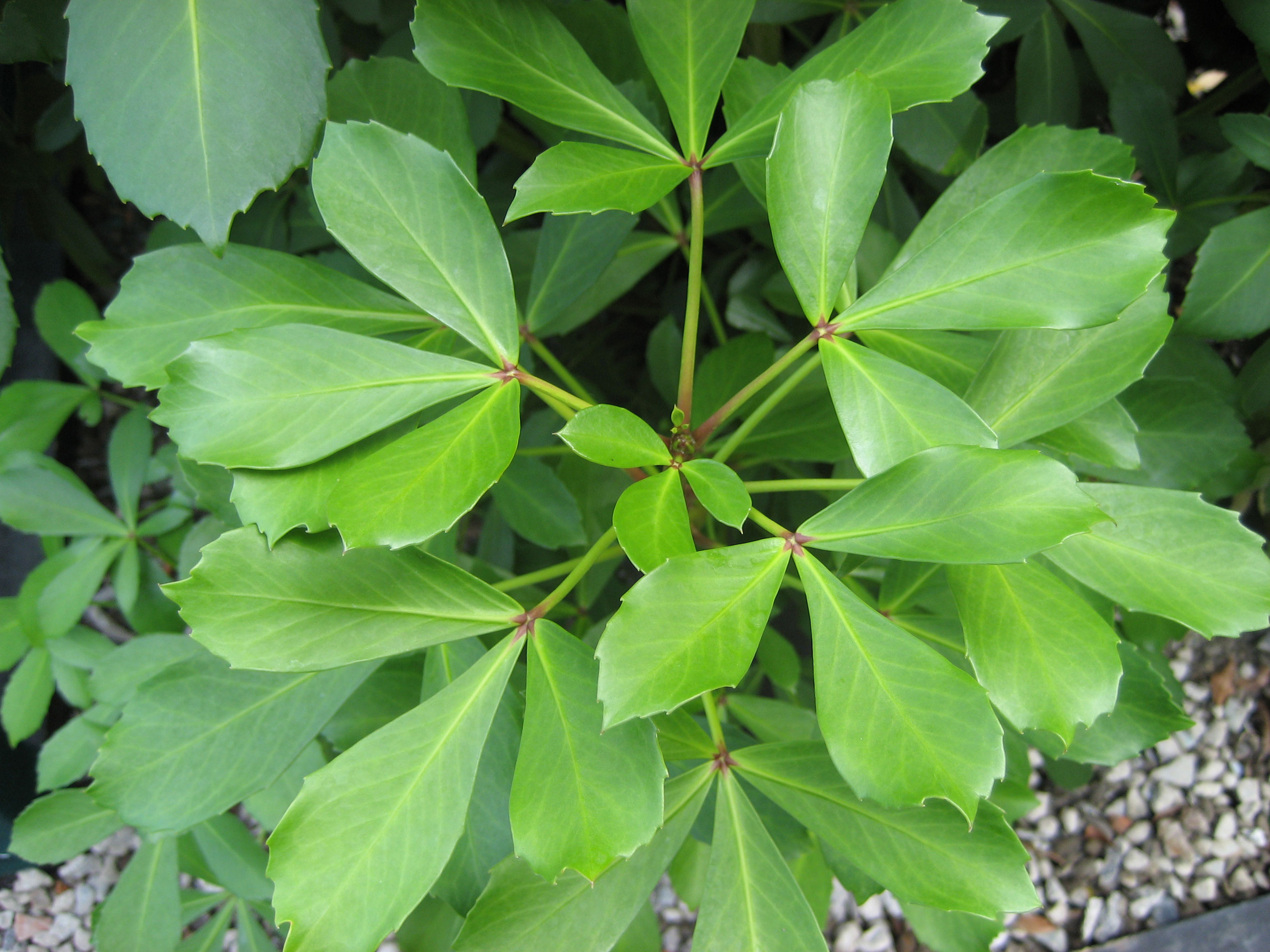
- The leaves have 3 to 5 leaflets

Conservation status
- Least Concern (IUCN 3.1)

Scientific classification
- Kingdom: Plantae
- Clade: Embryophytes
- Clade: Tracheophytes
- Clade: Angiosperms
- Clade: Eudicots
- Clade: Asterids
- Order: Apiales
- Family: Araliaceae
- Genus: Pseudopanax
- Species: P. lessonii

Binomial name
- Pseudopanax lessonii (DC.) K.Koch

Synonyms
- Panax lessonii DC.

= Pseudopanax lessonii =

Houpara

Species of tree endemic to New Zealand

Pseudopanax lessonii, commonly known as houpara, is a New Zealand native tree belonging to the family Araliaceae.

== Description ==
Houpara is a shrub or tree up to 6 m tall, with stout branches. The leaves are crowded towards the tips of branchlets, and are 3- to 5-foliolate. Juvenile plants have larger leaves than adults. The petioles are 5–15 cm long.

== Distribution ==
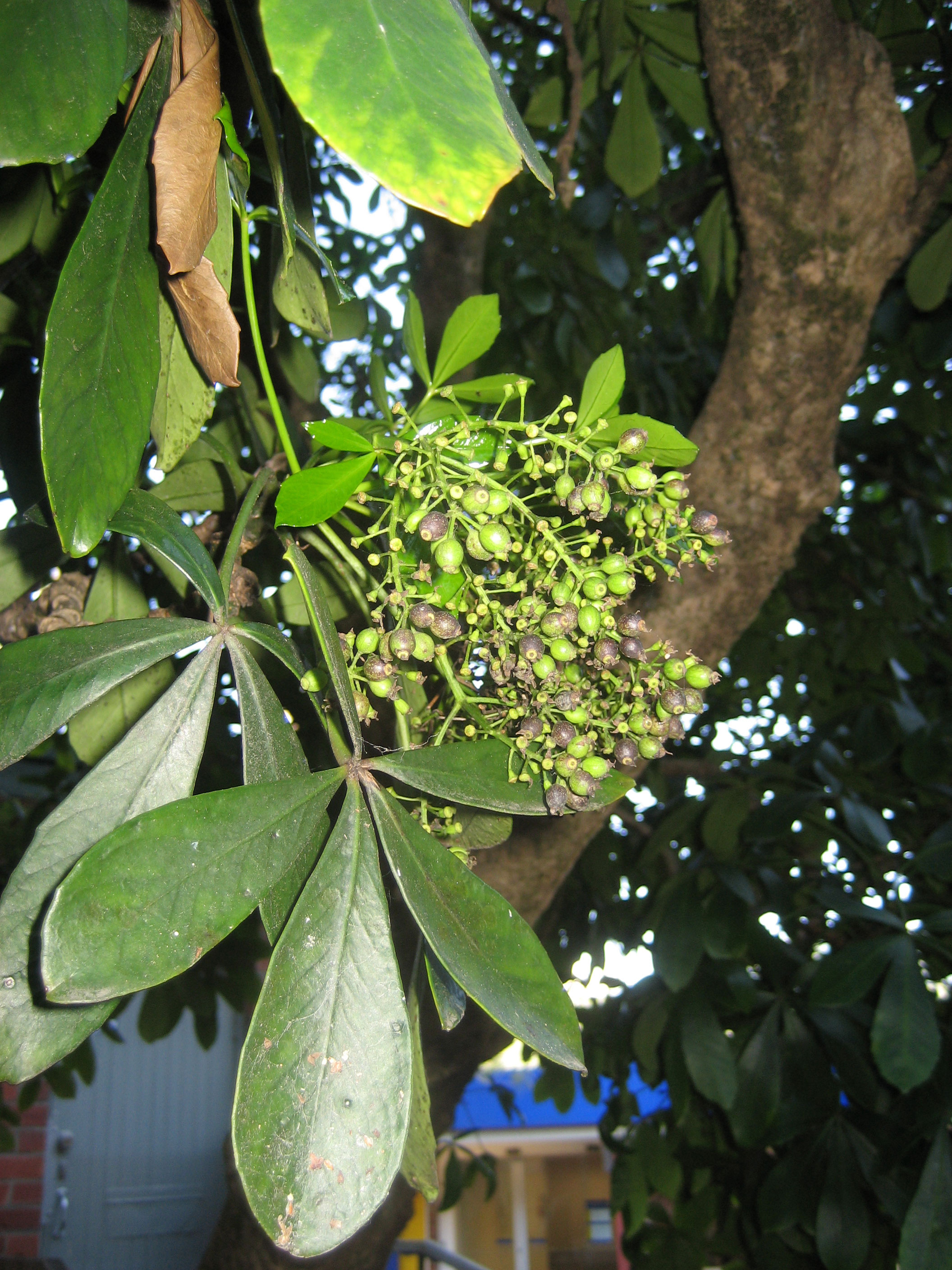
Mature tree with fruit

It is endemic to New Zealand, houpara's natural range is coastal forest and scrub on the Three Kings Islands and the North Island as far south as Poverty Bay (38°4′S).

== Cultivation ==
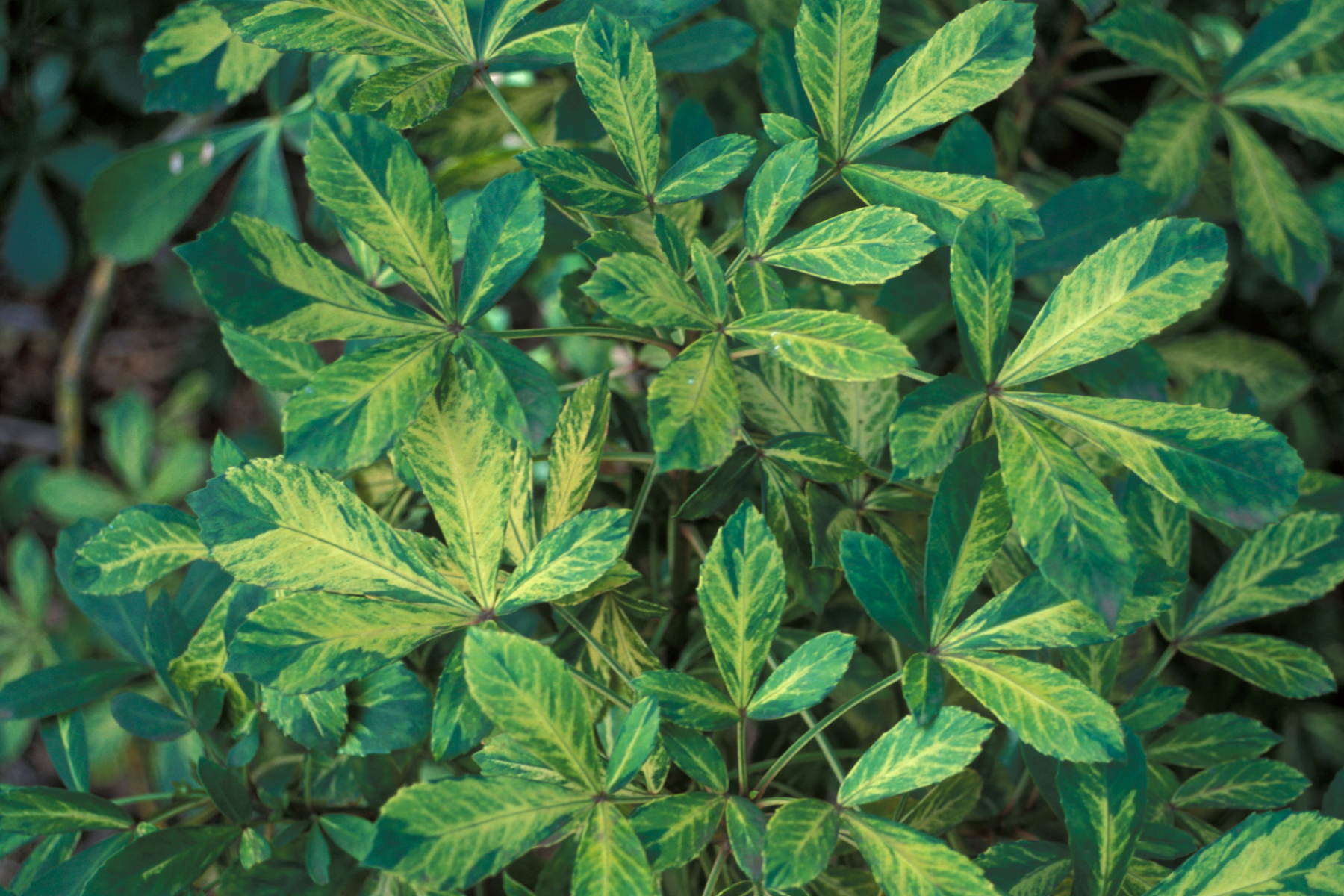
Gold Splash, a variegated cultivar of houpara

Houpara is popular in New Zealand gardens, but is rare in cultivation elsewhere, requiring mild, moist conditions, without extremes of temperature in winter and summer. A number of cultivars have been developed, including 'Gold Splash' which has yellow variegated leaves, and 'Nigra' which has dark purple-brown foliage.

== Species interactions ==
The lichen species Dictyomeridium neureuterae, endemic to Ōtata Island in the Noises, exclusively grows on the bark of Pseudopanax lessonii.
