= Zealanapis kuscheli =

Conservation status
- Data Deficit (NZ TCS)

Scientific classification
- Kingdom: Animalia
- Phylum: Arthropoda
- Subphylum: Chelicerata
- Class: Arachnida
- Order: Araneae
- Infraorder: Araneomorphae
- Family: Anapidae
- Genus: Zealanapis
- Species: Z. kuscheli

Binomial name
- Zealanapis kuscheli Platnick & Forster, 1989

Species of spiders

Zealanapis kuscheli is a species of spider in the family Anapidae that is endemic to New Zealand.

== Taxonomy ==
This species was described in 1989 by Norman Platnick and Ray Forster from male and female specimens collected in Auckland. The holotype is stored in the New Zealand Arthropod Collection under registration number NZAC03014955.

== Description ==
The male is recorded at 1.01mm in length whereas the female is 1.12mm.

== Distribution ==
This species is only known from a couple of locations in the North Island of New Zealand.

== Conservation status ==
Under the New Zealand Threat Classification System, this species is listed as "Data Deficient" with the qualifiers of "Data Poor: Size" and "Data Poor: Trend".
