= Zealanapis waipoua =

Conservation status
- Not Threatened (NZ TCS)

Scientific classification
- Kingdom: Animalia
- Phylum: Arthropoda
- Subphylum: Chelicerata
- Class: Arachnida
- Order: Araneae
- Infraorder: Araneomorphae
- Family: Anapidae
- Genus: Zealanapis
- Species: Z. waipoua

Binomial name
- Zealanapis waipoua Platnick & Forster, 1989

Species of spiders

Zealanapis waipoua is a species of Anapidae that is endemic to New Zealand.

== Taxonomy ==
This species was described in 1989 by Norman Platnick and Ray Forster from male and female specimens collected in Northland. The holotype is stored in the New Zealand Arthropod Collection under registration number NZAC03014957.

== Description ==
The male is recorded at 0.74mm in length whereas the female is 0.76mm.

== Distribution ==
This species is only known from Northland, New Zealand.

== Conservation status ==
Under the New Zealand Threat Classification System, this species is listed as "Not Threatened".
