= Zealanapis armata =

Conservation status
- Not Threatened (NZ TCS)

Scientific classification
- Kingdom: Animalia
- Phylum: Arthropoda
- Subphylum: Chelicerata
- Class: Arachnida
- Order: Araneae
- Infraorder: Araneomorphae
- Family: Anapidae
- Genus: Zealanapis
- Species: Z. armata

Binomial name
- Zealanapis armata (Forster, 1951)

Synonyms
- Chasmocephalon armatum

Species of spiders

Zealanapis armata is a species of Anapidae spider that is endemic to New Zealand.

== Taxonomy ==
This species was described as Chasmocephalon armatum in 1951 by Ray Forster from male and female specimens collected in Wellington. In 1989 it was transferred to Zealanapis. The holotype is stored in Canterbury Museum.

== Description ==
The male is recorded at 1.27mm in length whereas the female is 1.19mm. This species has a dark brown carapace and abdomen.

== Distribution ==
This species is known from throughout New Zealand.

== Conservation status ==
Under the New Zealand Threat Classification System, this species is listed as "Not Threatened".
