= Zealanapis australis =

Scientific classification
- Kingdom: Animalia
- Phylum: Arthropoda
- Subphylum: Chelicerata
- Class: Arachnida
- Order: Araneae
- Infraorder: Araneomorphae
- Family: Anapidae
- Genus: Zealanapis
- Species: Z. australis

Binomial name
- Zealanapis australis (Forster, 1951)

Synonyms
- Chasmocephalon australis Forster, 1951

Species of spider

Zealanapis australis is a spider species in the genus Zealanapis found in New Zealand.

== Taxonomy ==
This species was described as Chasmocephalon australis in 1951 by Ray Forster from male and female specimens collected on Bench Island. In 1989 it was transferred to Zealanapis. The holotype is stored in Te Papa Museum under registration number AS.000009.

== Description ==
The male is recorded at 1.09mm in length whereas the female is 1.28mm. This species has a dark brown carapace and legs. The abdomen is a mix of grey yellow and dark brown.

== Distribution ==
This species is only known from Otago and Southland in New Zealand.

== Conservation status ==
Under the New Zealand Threat Classification System, this species is listed as "Not Threatened".
