= Dictyomeridium =

Scientific classification
- Domain: Eukaryota
- Kingdom: Fungi
- Division: Ascomycota
- Class: Dothideomycetes
- Order: Trypetheliales
- Family: Trypetheliaceae
- Genus: Dictyomeridium; Aptroot, M.P.Nelsen & Lücking (2016)

Type species
- Dictyomeridium proponens (Nyl.) Aptroot, M.P.Nelsen & Lücking (2016)

Species
- D. amylosporum D. campylothelioides D. immersum D. isohypocrellinum D. lueckingii D. neureuterae D. paraproponens D. proponens D. tasmanicum

Genus of lichens

Dictyomeridium is a genus of corticolous (bark-dwelling), crustose lichens in the family Trypetheliaceae. It has nine species.

== Taxonomy ==
The genus was circumscribed in 2016 by lichenologists André Aptroot, Matthew Nelson, and Robert Lücking, with Dictyomeridium proponens assigned as the type species. The seven species they included in the genus were mostly previously classified in the genus Polymeridium, while the type species was known by different names in the genus Campylothelium. Phylogenetic analysis showed that the group of species was distant from the core group of their previous genus. An eight species, from Australia, was added to the genus in 2022.

== Description ==
Dictyomeridium is distinguished from other genera in the family Trypetheliaceae by its muriform (multichambered) ascospores, the lateral ostioles of its ascomata, and several subtle microscopic differences in the form of the hamathecium and the ascospores. Dictyomeridium species are distinguished from each other by their reaction to the UV test, the dimensions of their spores, and by the presence or absence of a red pigment in their ostioles. All species lack a cortex, and have conical to pyriform ascomata with eccentric (i.e., not placed centrally) ostioles. Sometimes, pycnidia are present.

== Species ==
- Dictyomeridium amylosporum (Vain.) Aptroot, M.P.Nelsen & Lücking (2016) – pantropical
- Dictyomeridium campylothelioides (Aptroot & Sipman) Aptroot, M.P.Nelsen & Lücking (2016) – Asia
- Dictyomeridium immersum (Aptroot, A.A.Menezes & M.Cáceres) Aptroot, M.P.Nelsen & Lücking (2016) – Brazil
- Dictyomeridium isohypocrellinum (Xavier-Leite, M.Cáceres & Aptroot) Aptroot, M.P.Nelsen & Lücking (2016) – Brazil
- Dictyomeridium lueckingii Flakus & Aptroot (2016) – Bolivia
- Dictyomeridium neureuterae A.J.Marshall, Aptroot, de Lange et Blanchon (2024) – New Zealand
- Dictyomeridium paraproponens (Aptroot, M.Cáceres & E.L.Lima) Aptroot, M.P.Nelsen & Lücking (2016) – Brazil
- Dictyomeridium proponens (Nyl.) Aptroot, M.P.Nelsen & Lücking (2016) – pantropical
- Dictyomeridium tasmanicum P.M.McCarthy & Kantvilas (2022) – Tasmania, Australia
