= Zealanapis punta =

Conservation status
- Data Deficit (NZ TCS)

Scientific classification
- Kingdom: Animalia
- Phylum: Arthropoda
- Subphylum: Chelicerata
- Class: Arachnida
- Order: Araneae
- Infraorder: Araneomorphae
- Family: Anapidae
- Genus: Zealanapis
- Species: Z. punta

Binomial name
- Zealanapis punta Platnick & Forster, 1989

Species of spiders

Zealanapis punta is a species of Anapidae that is endemic to New Zealand.

== Taxonomy ==
This species was described in 1989 by Norman Platnick and Ray Forster from male and female specimens collected from Mount Domett. The holotype is stored in the New Zealand Arthropod Collection under registration number NZAC03014956.

== Description ==
The male is recorded at 1.02mm in length whereas the female is 1.21mm.

== Distribution ==
This species is only known from Nelson, New Zealand.

== Conservation status ==
Under the New Zealand Threat Classification System, this species is listed as "Data Deficient" with the qualifiers of "Data Poor: Size" and "Data Poor: Trend".
