= Zealanapis montana =

Conservation status
- Not Threatened (NZ TCS)

Scientific classification
- Kingdom: Animalia
- Phylum: Arthropoda
- Subphylum: Chelicerata
- Class: Arachnida
- Order: Araneae
- Infraorder: Araneomorphae
- Family: Anapidae
- Genus: Zealanapis
- Species: Z. montana

Binomial name
- Zealanapis montana Platnick & Forster, 1989

Species of spiders

Zealanapis montana is a species of Anapidae that is endemic to New Zealand.

== Taxonomy ==
This species was described in 1989 by Norman Platnick and Ray Forster from male and female specimens collected in Lewis Pass. The holotype is stored in Otago Museum.

== Description ==
The male is recorded at 0.77mm in length whereas the female is 0.85mm.

== Distribution ==
This species is only known from the northwest of the South Island and Taranaki in the North Island.

== Conservation status ==
Under the New Zealand Threat Classification System, this species is listed as "Not Threatened".
