= The Noises =

Group of islands in the Hauraki Gulf near Auckland, New Zealand

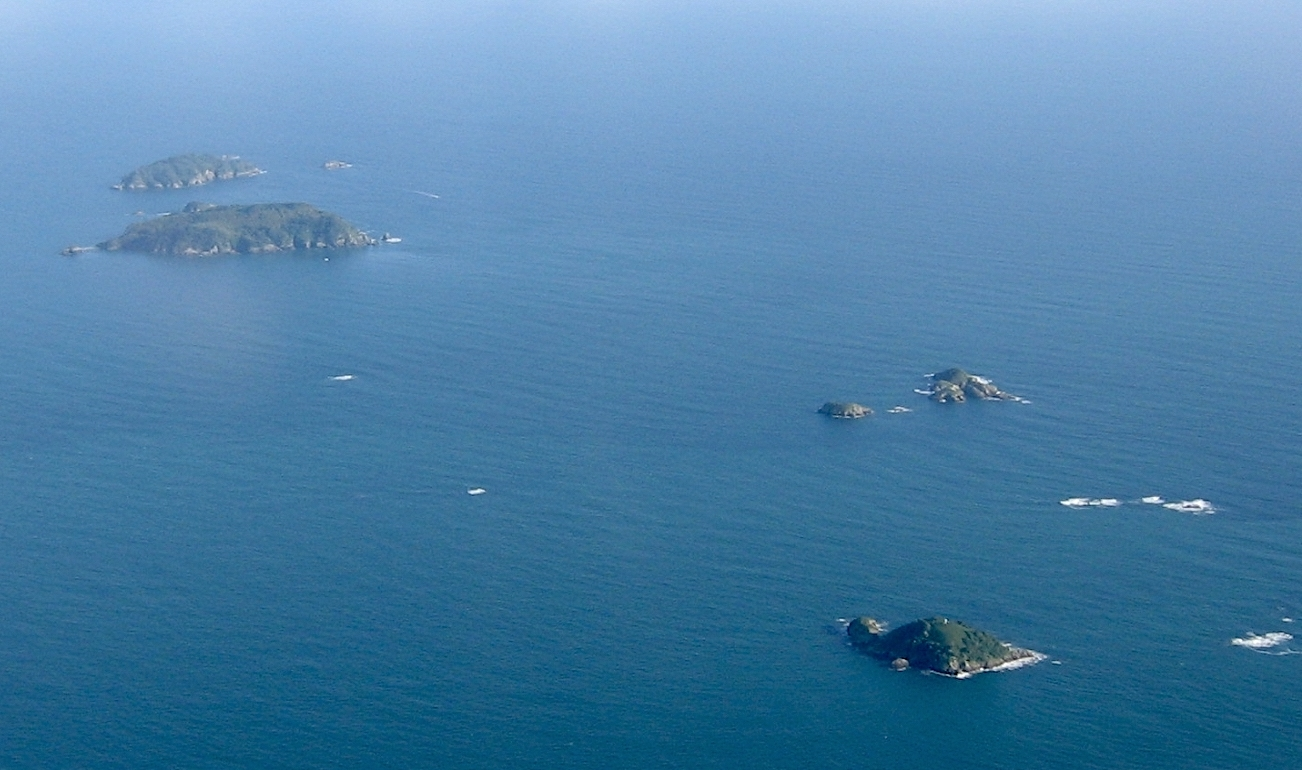
- Looking northeast from Maria (lower right) to David Rocks, Ōtata and Motuhoropapa (top left)
- Interactive map of The Noises

Geography
- Location: 24 km (15 mi) northeast of Auckland
- Coordinates: 36°41′42″S 174°58′30″E
- Archipelago: New Zealand
- Adjacent to: Hauraki Gulf
- Major islands: Ōtata; Motuhoropapa; Maria; Orarapa
- Highest elevation: 67 m (220 ft)

Administration
- New Zealand

Additional information
- Official website: www.thenoises.nz

The Noises are a collection of islands lying northeast of Rakino Island in Auckland's Hauraki Gulf, off the coast of the North Island of New Zealand. The largest and most forested islands are Ōtata and Motuhoropapa; Orarapa and Maria/Ruapuke are also significant. After a rat eradication campaign in the 1960s, Maria was the first New Zealand island to become predator-free. The lack of invasive predators, intact native forest, and large numbers of breeding seabirds give the Noises significant conservation value. There has however been a marked decline in marine biodiversity surrounding the islands from over-fishing.

== Geography ==
The Noises consist of a number of small islands and stacks in the inner Hauraki Gulf, a few kilometres north-east of Rakino Island and north of Waiheke Island. They are about 24 km northeast of Auckland, and are visible from the Auckland–Waiheke ferry. The three largest islands are Ōtata (15 ha, 67 m in height), which is 700 m away from Motuhoropapa, (9.5 ha, 50 m), and Maria, also known as Ruapuke (2.0 ha).

There are five small islets and several rock stacks: Orarapa Island (or the Haystack), a small isolated stack 1.1 km south-west of Motuhoropapa; Sunday and Scott Islands, two islets on the north-western side of Ōtata; David Rocks (also known as the Four Islands), itself made of five islets, four of which are joined at low tide, 1.8 km east of Ōtata; Ike Island and Tern Rock, north of Motuhoropapa; Tākapu Rock; and Zeno Rock.

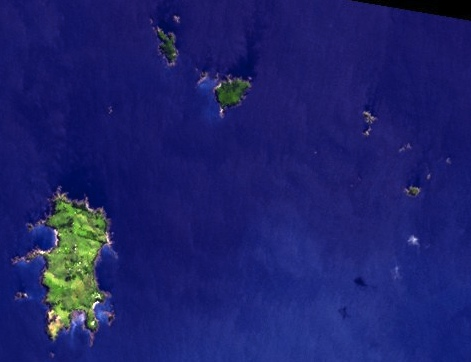
Satellite image showing the Noises in relation to Rakino (lower left)

Name	Also known as	Coordinates	Area ha	Height m
Ōtata Island	Otata (Note: Otata is the official name gazetted by the New Zealand Geographic Board in 1958, when the macrons that indicate long vowels were not in use in New Zealand English. The modern spelling is with a macron.)	036°41′45″S 174°58′28″E	15	67
Motuhoropapa Island		036°41′23″S 174°57′51″E	9.5	50
Maria Island	Ruapuke	036°42′32″S 175°00′20″E	2.0	30
Orarapa Island	The Haystack	036°41′52″S 174°57′16″E	0.87	
Sunday Island		036°41′37″S 174°58′20″E		
Scott Island		036°41′59″S 174°58′22″E		
Ike Island		036°41′08″S 174°57′57″E		
Tern Rock		036°41′09″S 174°57′40″E		
David Rocks	The Four Islands	036°41′58″S 174°59′53″E	0.3	18
Zeno Rock		036°42′29″S 174°59′42″E	…	
Tākapu Rock		036°42′13″S 174°59′21″E	…	
Ahaaha Rocks		036°42′17″S 175°00′41″E	…	

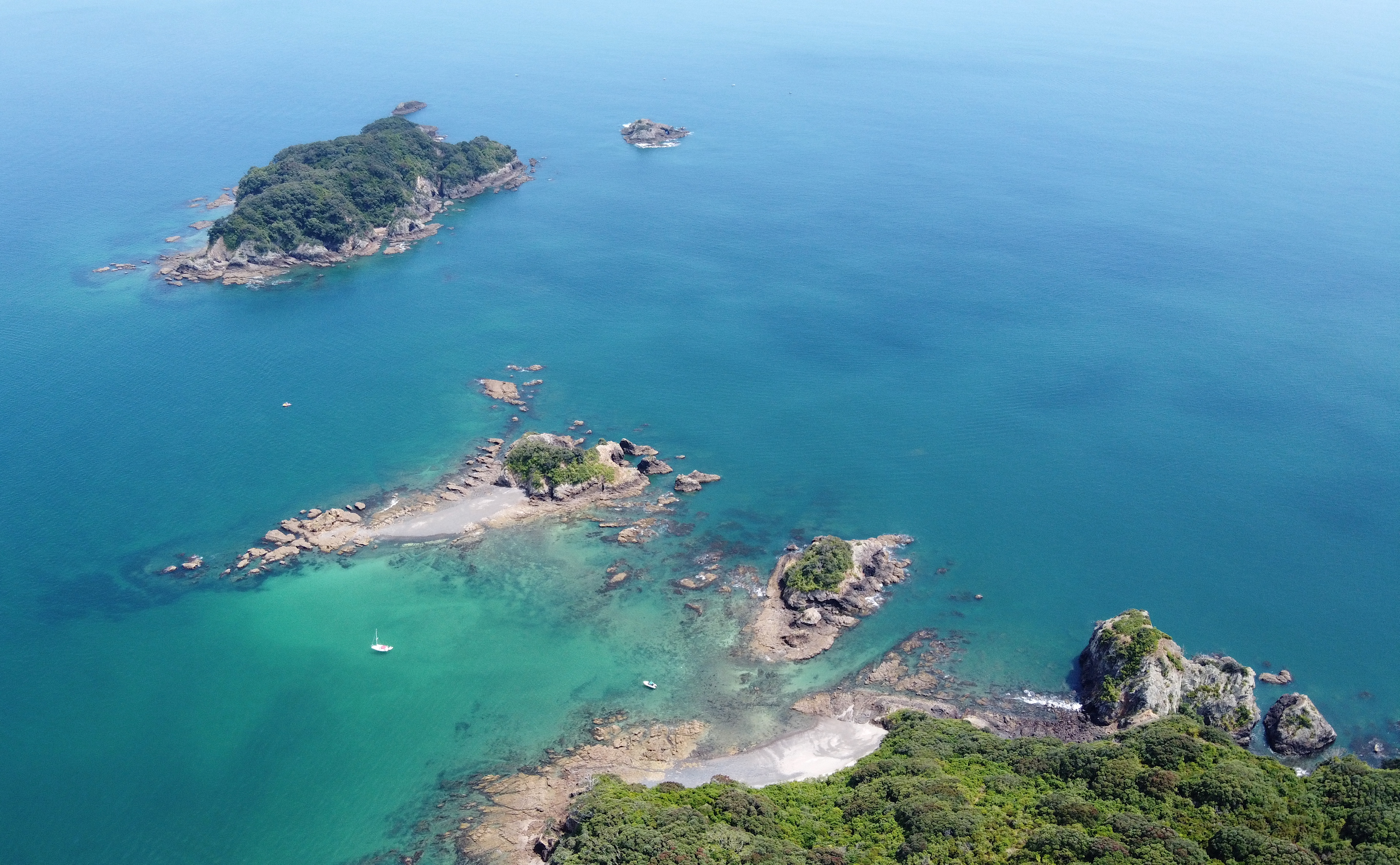
Looking north from Ōtata Island. Motuhoropapa Island (left) with Tern Rock (just visible), Ike Island to its right, and Scott and Sunday Islands in the centre

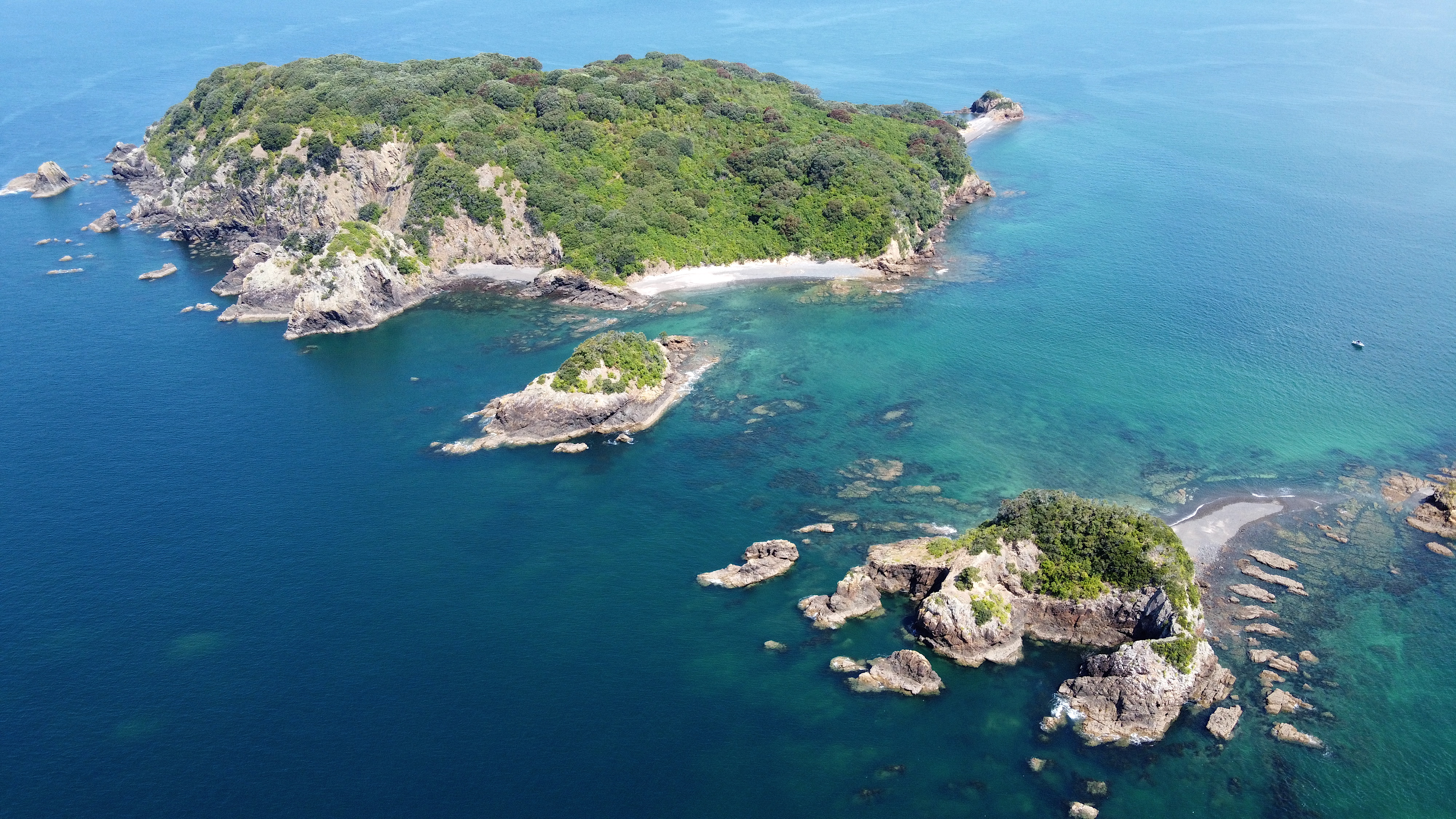
Left to right: Ōtata Island, Sunday Island, and Scott Island, looking south-east

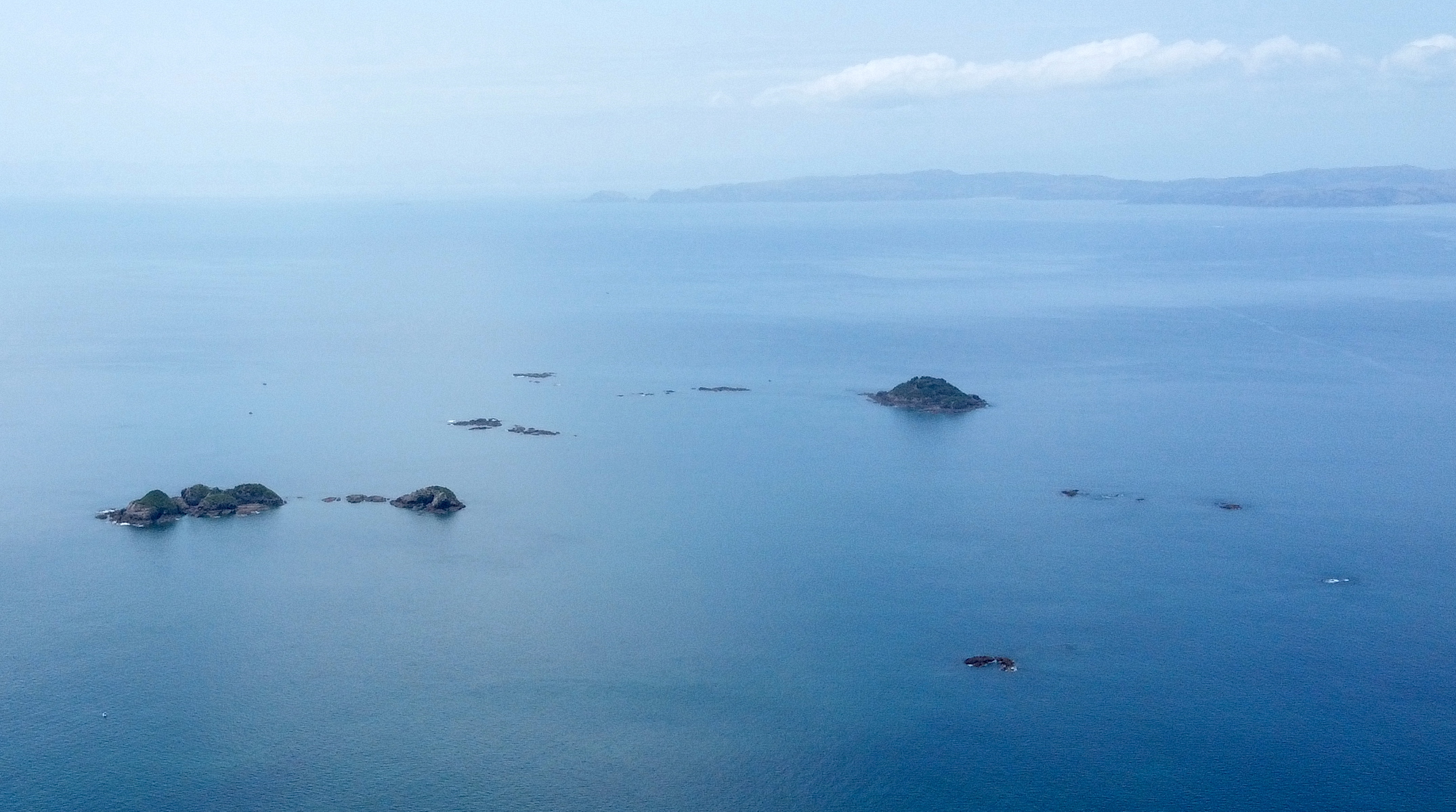
Looking south towards Auckland, with David Rocks (left) and Maria Island (right)

The islands are composed of complexly folded Jurassic greywackes and argillites, with rocky indented shorelines and wave-cut platforms that expose up to 25 m of rock at low tide. There are no permanent streams or other fresh water. The islands are surrounded by sheltered, shallow rocky reefs, with muddy or sandy seafloor in deeper areas.

Approximately 18,000 years ago during the Last Glacial Maximum when sea levels were over 100 metres lower than present day levels, the Noises were hilly features which were surrounded by a vast coastal plain where the Hauraki Gulf / Tīkapa Moana exists today. Sea levels began to rise 7,000 years ago, after which the Noises became islands separated from the rest of New Zealand.

== Name ==
In one theory, albeit never proved, French explorer Dumont D'Urville came across the islands in 1827 and named them Les Noisettes ("The Hazelnuts"), which, later corrupted to "the Noisies" or "the Noises", is the likely origin of the islands' English name. Local Māori refer to the Hauraki islands as the Ngā Pōito o Te Kupenga O Taramainuku (the floats of the net of Taramainuku). Taramainuku is a star, the captain of the waka in the constellation Te Waka-o-Rangi, next to Matariki. Taramainuku casts his net or kupenga every night to gather the souls of the deceased.

== Ownership ==
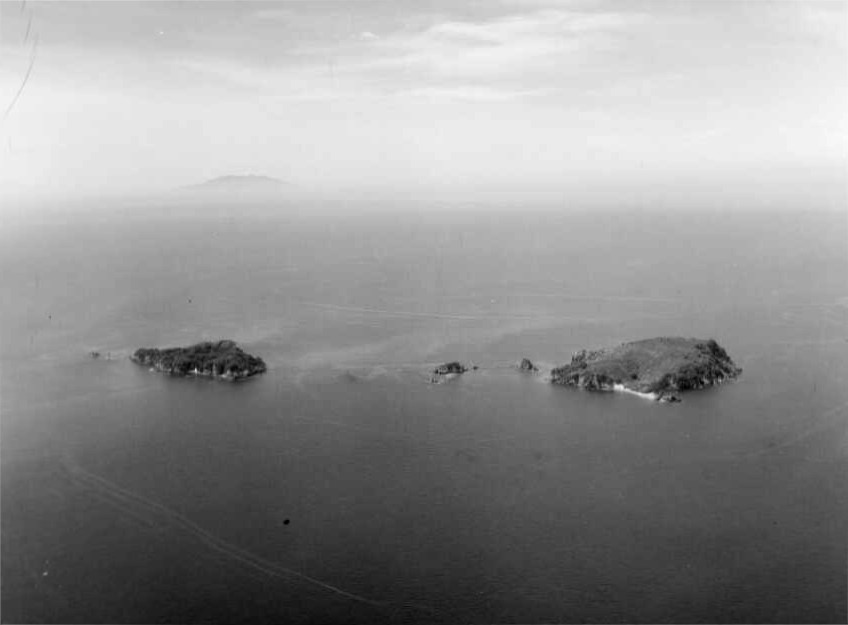
Motuhoropapa (left) and Ōtata Islands in 1954, when Ōtata was almost permanently inhabited by the Wainhouses

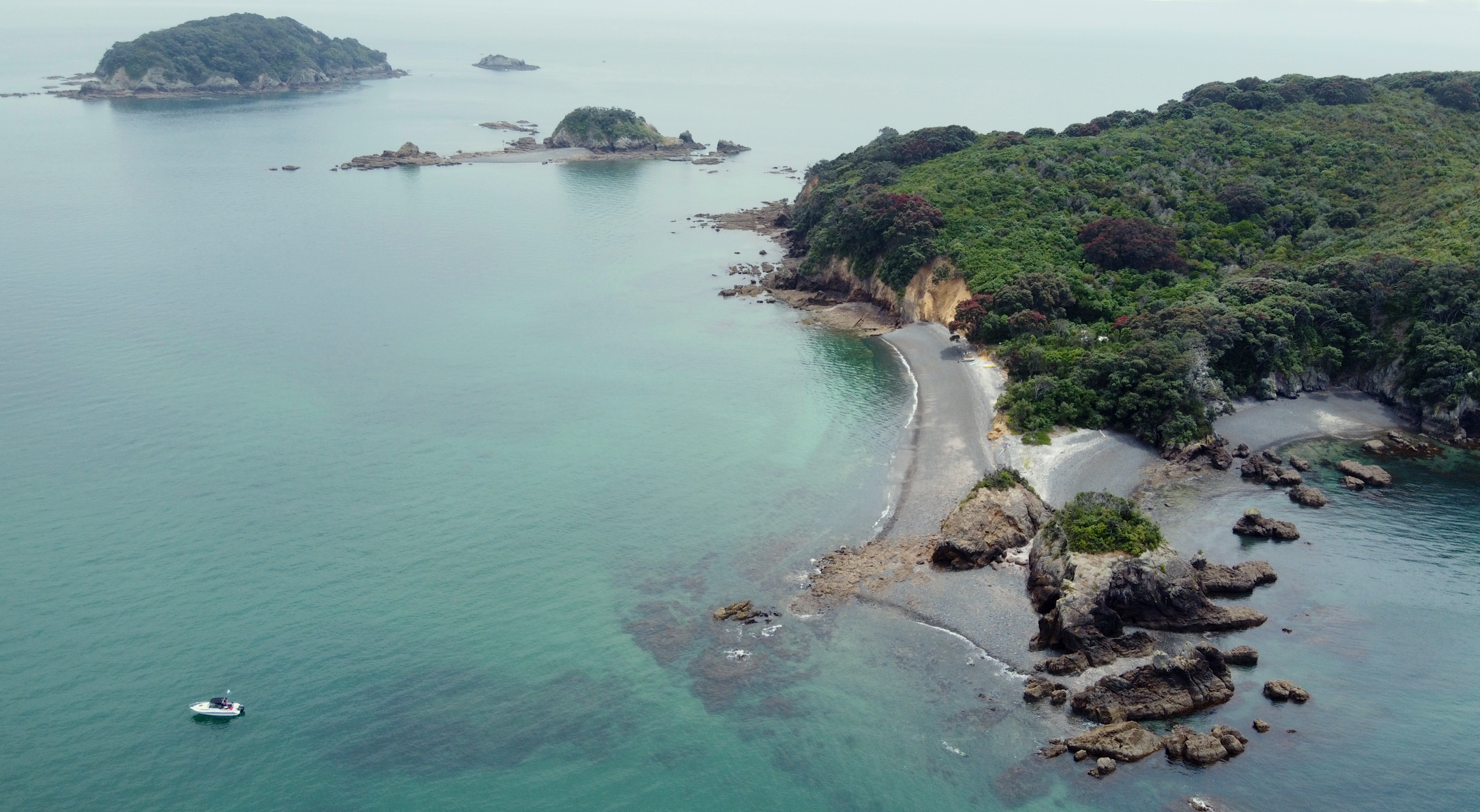
The Neureuter family bach is visible on Ōtata Island in the middle of the foreground peninsula

The Noises were visited and inhabited by Māori from several iwi over the centuries, who collected seafood and seabirds such as grey-faced petrels. A midden on Ōtata is only the second archaeological site in the Auckland region with evidence of occupation before the eruption of Rangitoto about 600 years ago.

One owner, J. J. Craig, built a cottage on the south-east corner of Ōtata Island, and sold the Noises to a Captain McKenzie in 1930. Captain Frederic Stanley Wainhouse, deputy harbour master for Auckland Harbour Board, purchased the island group from him in 1933 for £200. Wainhouse remarried in 1940 to Margaret Neureuter, and from 1942 the Wainhouses spent a significant portion of their lives living on the islands, keeping chickens and brewing their own beer. Fred Wainhouse died on Ōtata Island in 1957, and his widow passed on ownership of the islands that year to her nephew Brian P. Neureuter, who in turn passed it on to his son. When Brian and Marlene Neureuter died, their ashes were scattered on the island. In 1995 the Neureuter family formed the Noises Trust, to which they gifted the islands.

There are only three structures on the Noises: the Neureuter family bach on Ōtata; a hut on Motuhoropapa built by the Wildlife Service around 1977 during a study of the island's Norway rats, restored by the University of Auckland in 2014; and a navigation light installed on Maria Island in 1953.

== Flora ==
The Noises have never been cleared or farmed, and so retain some of the highest-quality native vegetation of the inner Hauraki Gulf islands. Their lack of invasive mammals and low weed numbers make them important from a conservation point of view, and they are a seed source for regeneration projects on other islands.

The forest on Ōtata was damaged by an accidental fire sometime between 1925 and 1930, but has now largely regenerated to a closed canopy 4–8 m (13–26 ft) high. It is dominated by pōhutukawa (Metrosideros excelsa), red matipo (Myrsine australis), coastal karamu (Coprosma macrocarpa), karo (Pittosporum crassifolium), houpara (Pseudopanax lessonii) and māhoe (Melicytus ramiflorus). An 800-year-old pōhutukawa near the house is 70 m (230 ft) across at the crown. Karo on Ōtata reaches close to its maximum size, with trunks 40 cm (16 in) in diameter. The understory includes bracken (Pteridium esculentum), cutty grass (Gahnia lacera), and coastal astelia (Astelia banksii). The lichen species Dictyomeridium neureuterae is endemic to Ōtata, growing on the bark of Pseudopanax lessonii.

Motuhoropapa has a more mature forest with a canopy averaging 6–10 m high and reaching 20 m. Similar to Ōtata's, it contains pōhutukawa, karo, houpara, māhoe, and coastal karamu, but also includes wharangi (Melicope ternata), with kohekohe (Dysoxylum spectabile) in the understorey. The other islands in the Noises are forested with karo, houpara, taupata (Coprosma repens), and ngaio (Myoporum laetum).

Maria Island has no pōhutukawa, but is forested with taupata and coastal mahoe (Melicytus novae-zelandiae). Clearing the summit in the 1950s to build the safety light may have allowed the establishment of invasive weeds, notably the vine Dipogon lignosus, known as "mile-a-minute". Mile-a-minute is a significant problem on Maria, and there are regular volunteer efforts to control it. Invasive boxthorn (Lycium ferocissimum) is also known from five islands in the group.

== Fauna ==
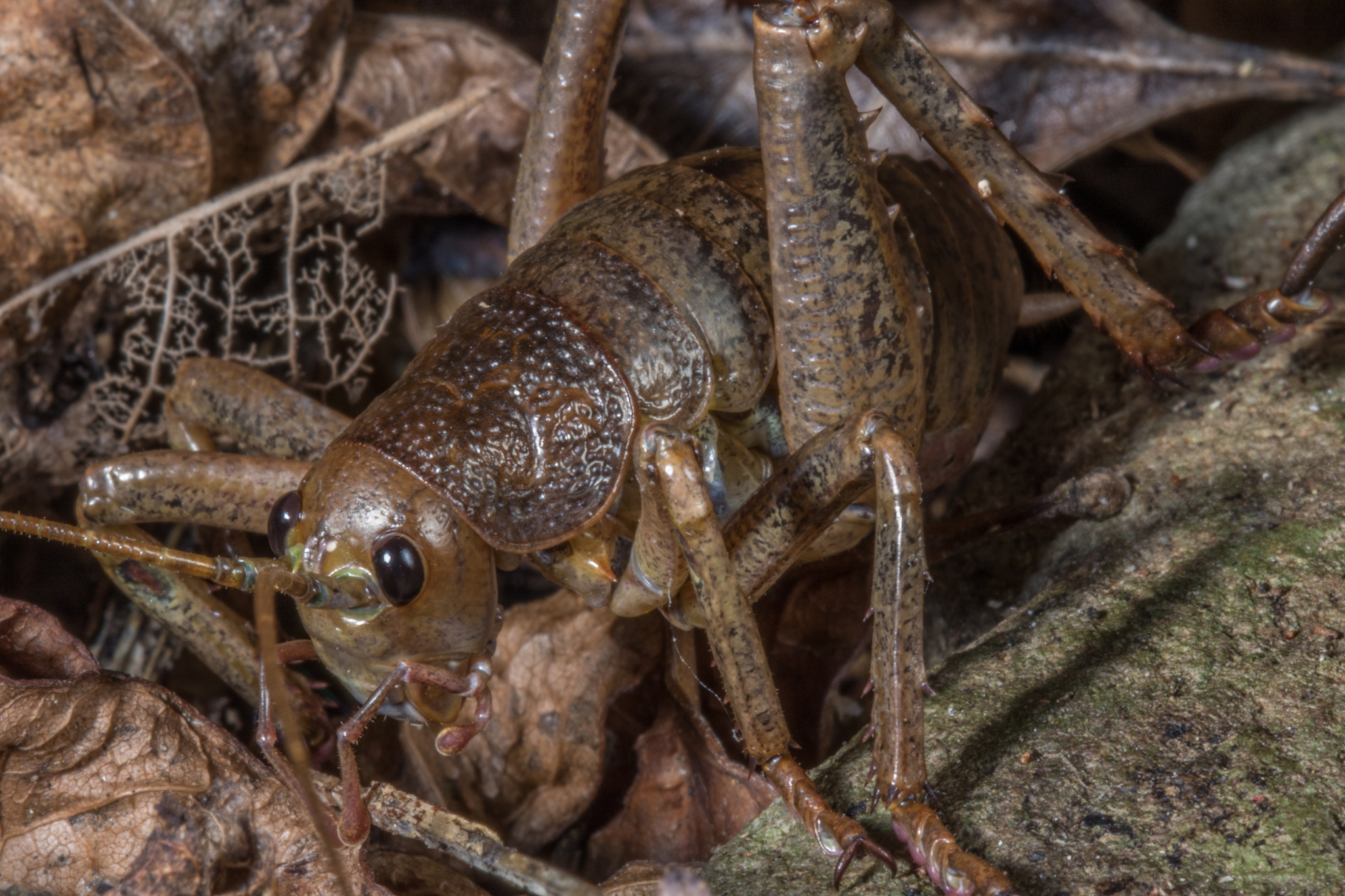
Wētāpunga (Deinacrida heteracantha)

Because the Noises are currently free of introduced mammalian predators such as rats, mice, or kiore, they are rich in species that are rare or absent on the mainland. Raukawa geckos (Woodworthia maculata), copper skinks (Oligosoma aeneum) and shore skinks (O. smithi) are present on Ōtata; the gecko is also found on Maria Island.

One hundred flax snails/pupuharakeke (Placostylus hongii) were released on Motuhoropapa Island in 1934 by malacologist Baden Powell, from a population on Archway Island in the Poor Knights. The tiny charopid landsnail Climocella haurakiensis was described in 1996 from specimens collected on Ōtata and Motuhoropapa. The giant wētā Deinacrida heteracantha or wētāpunga, bred in captivity at Auckland Zoo since 2012, has been translocated to the Noises: 1000 juveniles were released in 2015 and 300 in 2018.

The Noises are breeding sites for eight seabird species, including grey-faced petrels (Pterodroma macroptera), which breed in burrows on Ōtata, Motuhoropapa, Sunday, Scott, and Maria Islands from August to December. Kororā or little penguins (Eudyptula minor) are not as common as they once were but some still breed in burrows, some even occasionally underneath the house on Ōtata. Maria Island is one of only six colonies of white-faced storm petrels (Pelagodroma marina) in the wider Gulf. Pied shags (Phalacrocorax varius) breed regularly in trees on the south-east side of Ōtata.

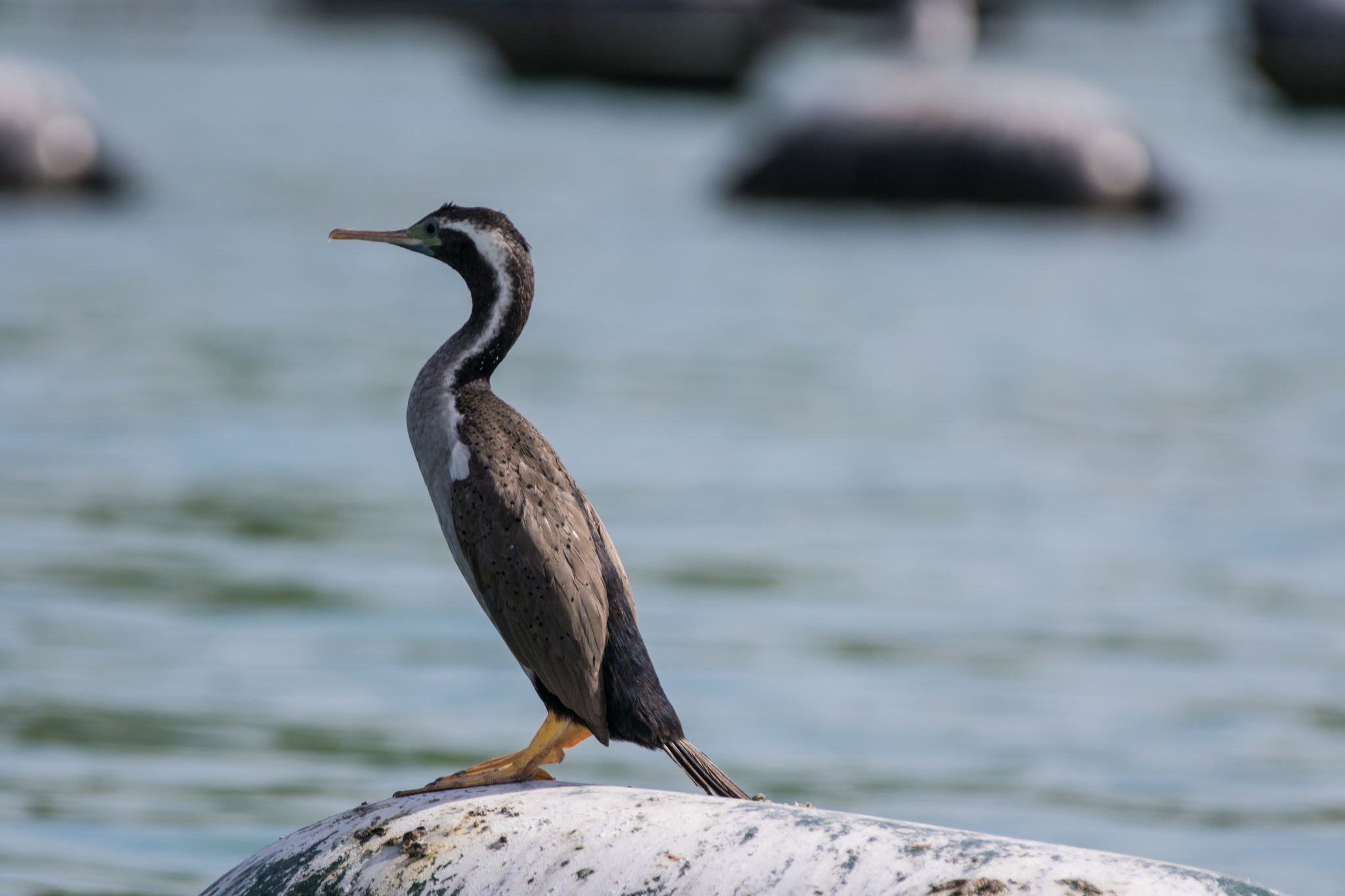
Spotted shag (Stictocarbo punctatus) at nearby Waiheke Island

Thirty two species of land birds are present, thirteen breeding there, including fantails (Rhipidura fuliginosa), silvereyes (Zosterops lateralis), tūi, bellbird and grey warblers (Gerygone igata). Introduced brown quail (Synoicus ypsilophoris) were common in the 1920s and '30s but had disappeared by 1960, probably because of the arrival of Norway rats.

Spotted shags or kawau tikitiki (Stictocarbo punctatus) were common in the Hauraki Gulf as recently as 1910, but fishermen at the time regarded them as competitors for their catch, and they were widely persecuted and shot for sport. More than half the Gulf's spotted shag nesting colonies had been abandoned by 1920, and by 1931, when the species achieved legal protection, the only remaining colonies in the Gulf were at eastern Waiheke Island and at David Rocks in the Noises; Robert Falla and Arthur Pycroft erected notices around the David Rocks colony to warn people the birds were protected by law. By the 1950s 40 spotted shags were seen at a nesting colony on Ōtata Island, and two hundred on David Rocks. In 1970 a colony of 100 birds was recorded on Ōtata, and 25 on David Rocks, but these petered out soon after. By the 1980s or 1990s spotted shags had finally disappeared from the Noises. This corresponded with illegal shooting of birds in the colony, increasing boating and fishing around the islands, and dramatic declines in populations of pilchards and anchovies in the Gulf.

== Conservation ==
The Noises have not always been free of introduced mammals. Rabbits were present until the mid-1940s. Norway rats (Rattus norvegicus) began to arrive in the 1950s, either swimming from garbage dumped from a ship or stowing away on boats travelling to Ōtata and Maria Islands. Once established, they were able to swim between the other islands. Rats reached Ōtata in 1956, Maria in late 1959, David Rocks in 1960, and Motuhoropapa in 1962.

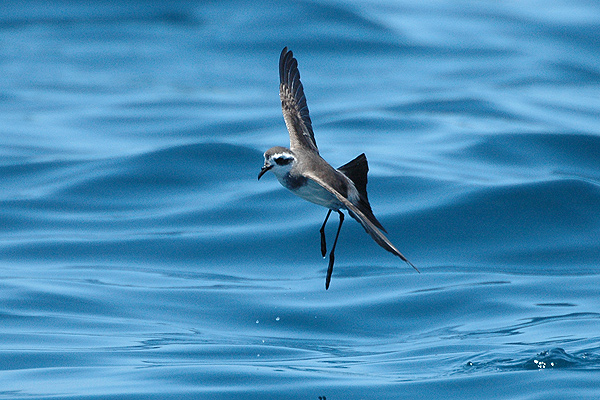
White-faced storm petrel (Pelagodroma marina)

The effects of rats were first noted in late 1959, when they were found to be killing chicks of white-faced storm petrels on Maria Island and David Rocks. Hundreds of dead petrels were discovered by Waiheke schoolteacher Alistair McDonald, who with his class formed a junior division of Forest and Bird, and in January 1960 wrote to the Department of Internal Affairs requesting £5 to purchase warfarin rat poison. Twice in 1960 poison baits were laid by Junior Forest and Bird, and the campaign was continued by Don Merton of the New Zealand Wildlife Service until September 1963. By 1964 this effort had eradicated rats from Maria Island and David Rocks – the first New Zealand islands to become predator-free, and one of the first successful island rat eradications in the world. The Maria Island colony survived and recovered. Rats were eradicated from the remaining Noises islands in the 1980s, but have reinvaded by swimming at least six times since then, from as far as Rakino (2 km away) until that too had a rat eradication programme. The islands have been predator free since 2002.

In 2019 a team from Auckland Council and Auckland Museum constructed an artificial spotted shag colony on a cliff face on the northeastern side of Ōtata, with 3D-printed replica birds, recorded shag calls played over a solar-powered sound system, hand-woven nests, and white paint to imitate guano. The decoy shags were based on specimens in Auckland Museum, collected by museum staff in the Noises in 1913. It was hoped that shags would colonise from nearby breeding colonies on Waiheke Island and Tarahiki Island, which have an estimated population of 300 breeding pairs of birds, possibly genetically distinct from spotted shags in the South Island. Ōtata was chosen, being a former colony site and close enough to be seen by passing shags but far enough to give access to richer feeding grounds. As of 2021, spotted shags had been observed visiting the artificial colony, though establishing a breeding population could take many years.

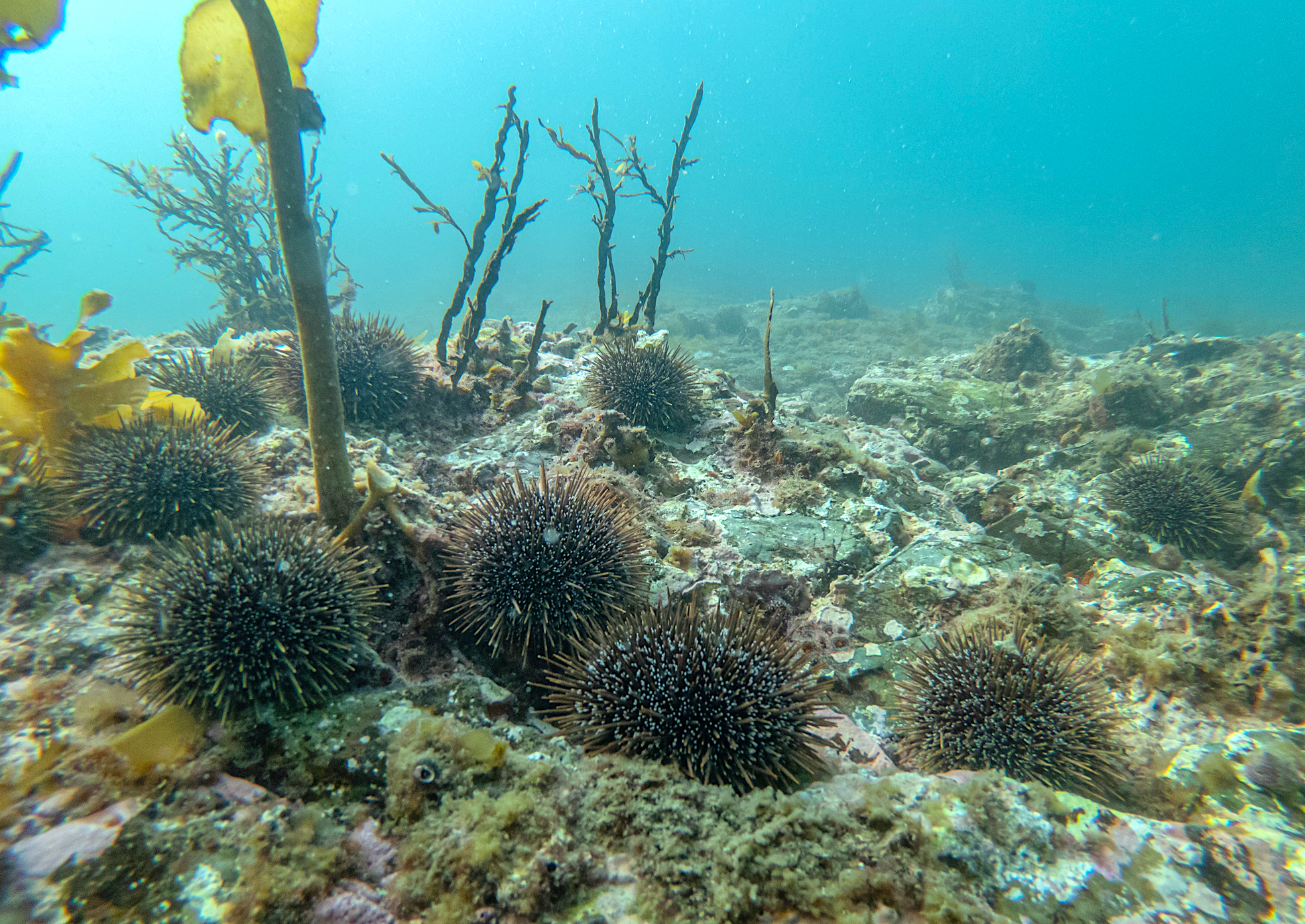
Barren seafloor caused by kina (Evechinus chloroticus) consuming kelp

The soft seafloor around the Noises is notable for the presence of rhodoliths or coralline algae, as well as dog cockles (Tucetona laticostata), whose accumulated mounds of thick shells are colonised by encrusting and free-living invertebrates. This rich habitat provides a nursery for young scallops (Pecten novaezelandiae) and snapper (Pagrus auratus). The Noises are also, however, a favoured area for recreational fishing, with 60–80 boats around the islands on some days. The scallop beds have been extensively dredged and harvested by divers, and much of the sea-floor habitat has been destroyed, leading to a decline in horse mussels (Atrina zelandica), sponges, and rhodoliths.

Extensive fishing has led to the decline of snapper and the almost complete disappearance of koura or spiny rock lobsters (Jasus edwardsii) in the Hauraki Gulf. This has probably led to a trophic cascade, with an increase in the number of kina (Evechinus chloroticus) and the consequential decline of kelp (Ecklonia radiata) creating kina barrens. The Neureuter family have observed over several generations a decline in marine life at Ōtata, including the disappearance of baitfish, squid, and koura, and the decrease in size and abundance of snapper, trevally, kingfish and kahawai (Arripis trutta). The 2017 Hauraki Gulf Marine Spatial Plan proposed a marine protected area around the Noises, with a surrounding community co-management area, with the goal of allowing the recovery of marine life.

== In culture ==
A radio-collared rat named Razza was deliberately released on Motuhoropapa to test rat dispersal; he swam to Ōtata before being trapped under the Neureuter's sink. His story was the subject of a 2006 children's book by Witi Ihimaera, The Amazing Adventures of Razza the Rat.

== See also ==
- Islands of New Zealand
