= Rākino Island =

Island in the Hauraki Gulf, New Zealand

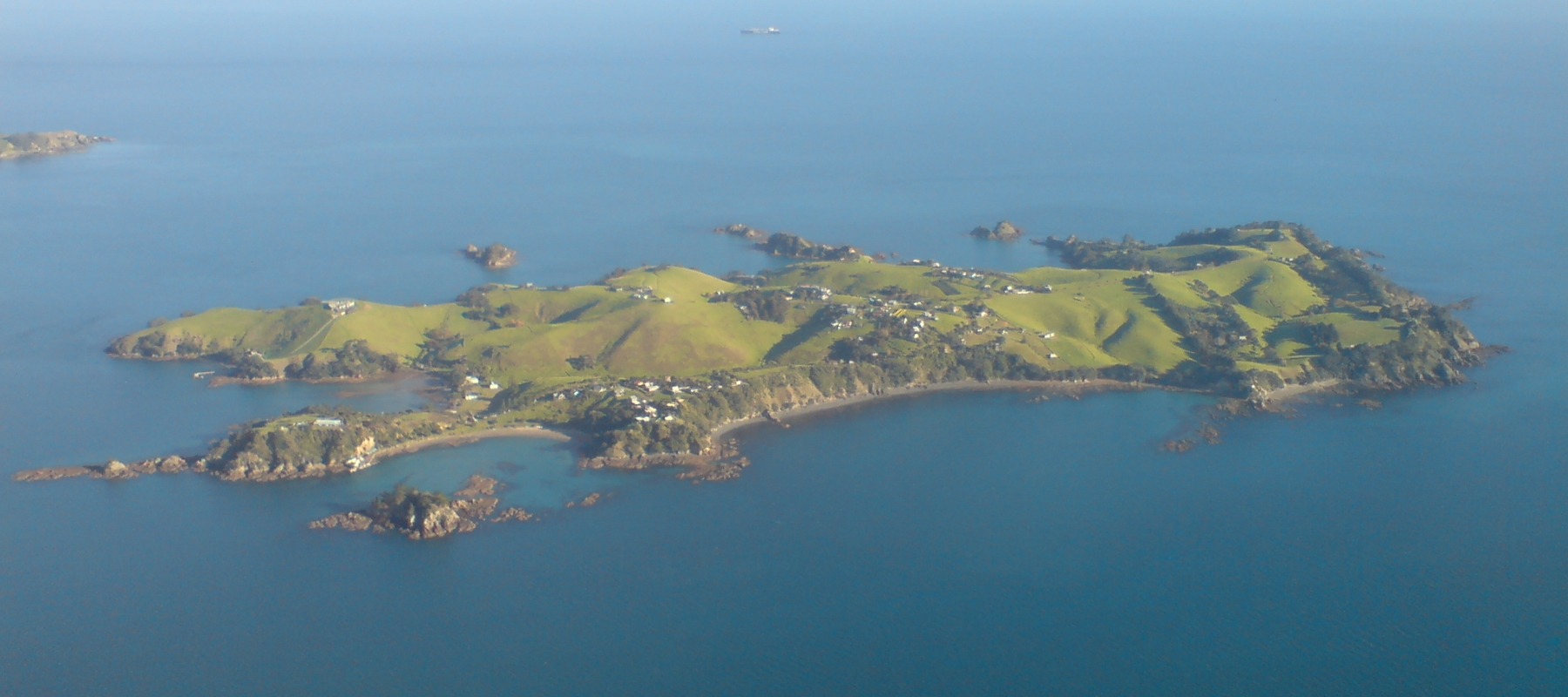
- The island from the southeast
- Interactive map of Rākino Island

Geography
- Coordinates: 36°43′S 174°57′E
- Area: 1.5 km^{2} (0.58 sq mi)
- Length: 2.4 km (1.49 mi)
- Width: 1.2 km (0.75 mi)

Administration
- New Zealand

Demographics
- Population: 21 (2019)

Rākino Island is one of the many islands in the Hauraki Gulf / Tīkapa Moana, an arm of the Pacific Ocean to the northeast of Auckland, New Zealand.

Rākino is a small island north-east of Motutapu Island. The island is 2.4 km (1.5 mi) long and about 1.2 km (0.75 mi) wide, and has an area of 1.5 km² (0.58 sq mi / 371 acres). The two most popular bays have public access, but three others also have access from the sea. There are smaller bays and beaches without public access. The public wharf is at the south end of Sandy Bay, and a barge access ramp is at the western end of Sanford Way in Home Bay. The hilly topography comprises a fertile layer of volcanic topsoil from Rangitoto Island that overlays a thick mantle of clay soil which in turn overlays greywacke rock. The island is mostly in pasture with pockets of coastal pōhutukawa.

There are around 76 dwellings on Rākino Island though the permanent population is only 21 as of 2019.

== History ==
Sir George Grey, governor of New Zealand, bought Rākino in 1862. He ordered trees and started building a house in Home Bay but he lost interest when Kawau Island became available. During the 1860s the prisoners from the Invasion of the Waikato phase of the New Zealand Wars were brought to Auckland, some were housed in the hulks Marion and Manukau at anchor in the harbour and a small party was settled at Rākino, where a house and gardening supplies were provided. The experiment was a failure and soon abandoned. There is an entry in the Appendices to the House of Representatives Journal which says "Ihaka did not thrive much on the island and died there, it is presumed of homesickness and a broken heart."

In 1874 Albert Sanford leased the island from Sir George Grey before his wife, Elizabeth Sanford, bought it in 1904. He and his family lived there for nearly 80 years. He was one of the founders of the Auckland commercial fishing fleet. His company started on Rākino Island in 1881, and he sold fish on the wharves at the bottom of Queen St. “Sanford Limited” was incorporated in 1904. The family home he built still stands in Home Bay. It was built of kauri logs rafted from Mercury Bay on the Coromandel Peninsula.

In 1963, the island was bought by Maxwell Rickard, president of the UPO (United Peoples' Organisation (Worldwide) Incorporated), with the aim of setting up a philanthropic community. Rickard was a clinical psychologist and hypnotherapist and also owned an Auckland nightclub and toured as a professional hypnotherapist under the name "The Great Ricardo". Plans for the island included a clinic for disturbed and nervous patients, an international orphanage, a refuge for unmarried mothers and homes for the elderly. However, these plans did not eventuate and the island was subdivided in 1965 into 25 blocks of 10 acres (40,000 m^{2}) and 125 smaller pieces of land which sold for between £2500 and £6000.

Communication on the island was a problem, so the world's first solar-powered telephone was installed. While widespread use of mobile phones has reduced reliance on landlines, the phone is still in use and local calling to Auckland is free.

== Biodiversity ==
In 2002 the invasive Norwegian rat was eradicated from Rākino Island.

This has enabled native birds to establish in significant numbers. Birds now present on Rakino Island include:

- Tui
- Bellbird
- Kakariki
- Kereru
- Spotless Crake
- Banded Rail
- Grey faced petrel
- Grey Warbler
- Silvereye
- Harrier hawk
- Pukeko
- Oystercatcher
- Morepork

== See also ==
- List of islands of New Zealand
- New Zealand outlying islands
