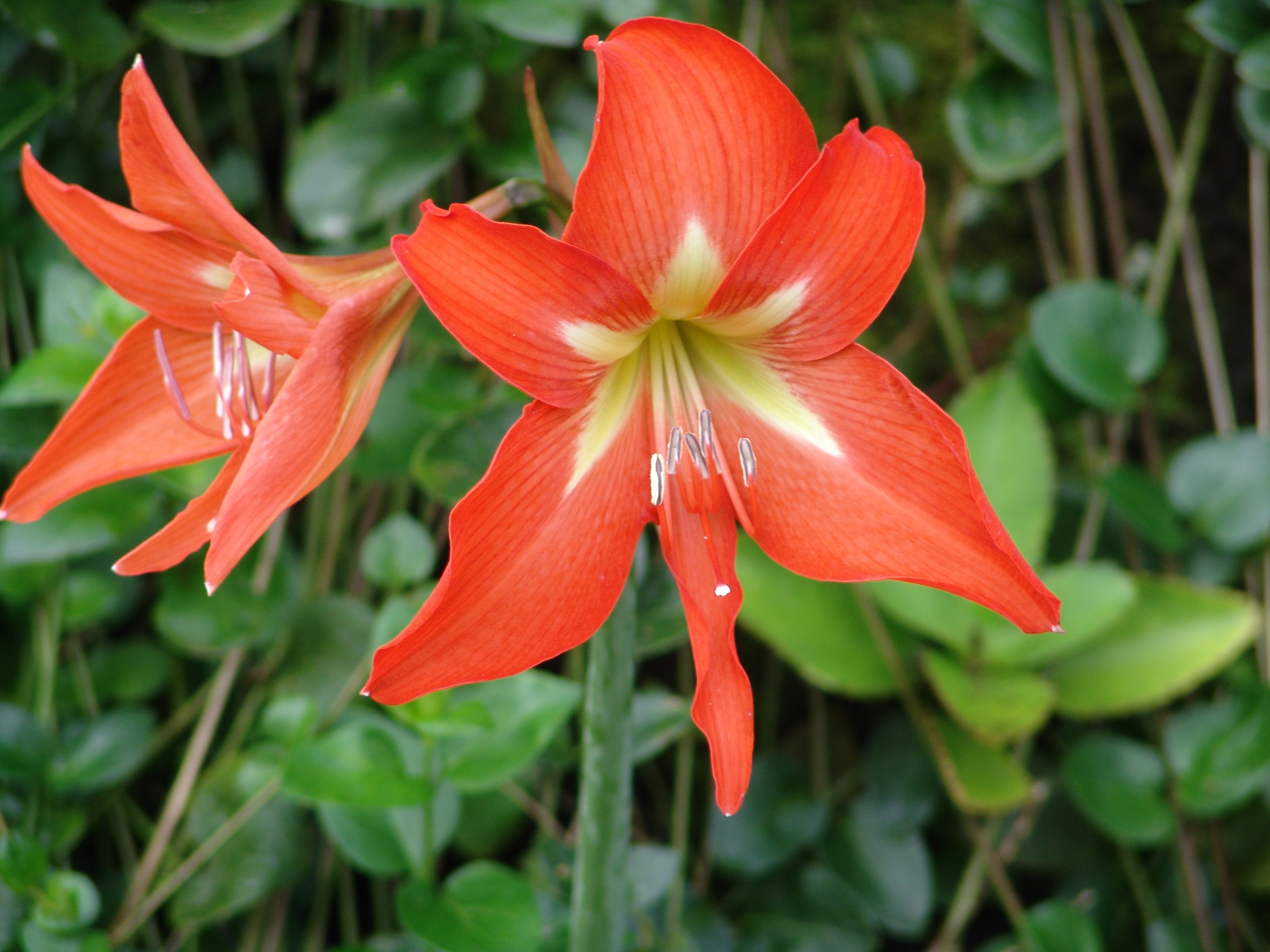
- Hippeastrum reginae

Scientific classification
- Kingdom: Plantae
- Clade: Embryophytes
- Clade: Tracheophytes
- Clade: Spermatophytes
- Clade: Angiosperms
- Clade: Monocots
- Order: Asparagales
- Family: Amaryllidaceae
- Subfamily: Amaryllidoideae
- Subtribe: Hippeastrinae
- Genus: Hippeastrum; Herb.

Type species
- Hippeastrum reginae (L.) Herb.

Subgenera
- Hippeastrum subg. Tocantinia (Ravenna) Nic.García; Hippeastrum subg. Hippeastrum (autonym)

Synonyms
- List: Aschamia Salisb.; Aulica Raf.; Callicore Link; Carlotea Arruda ex H.Kost.; Chonais Salisb.; Eusarcops Raf.; Lais Salisb.; Leopoldia Herb.nom. rej. (Note: nom. rej. rejected homonym not Parl. 1845); Lepidopharynx Rusby; Moldenkea Traub; Omphalissa Salisb.; Trisacarpis Raf.

= Hippeastrum =

Genus of flowering plants

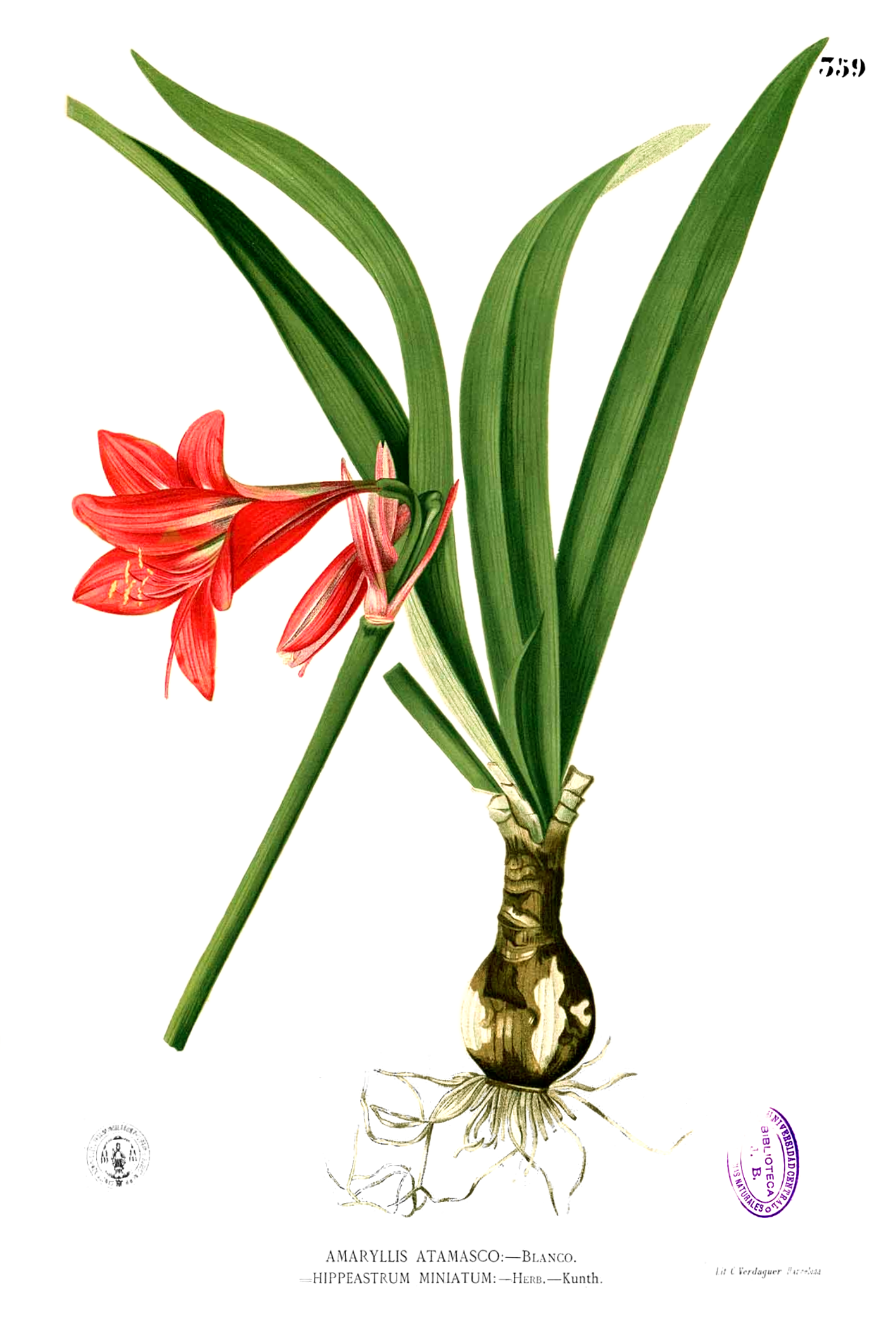
Flower, leaves and bulb of Hippeastrum miniatum. Francisco Manuel Blanco, Flora de Filipinas 1880–1883

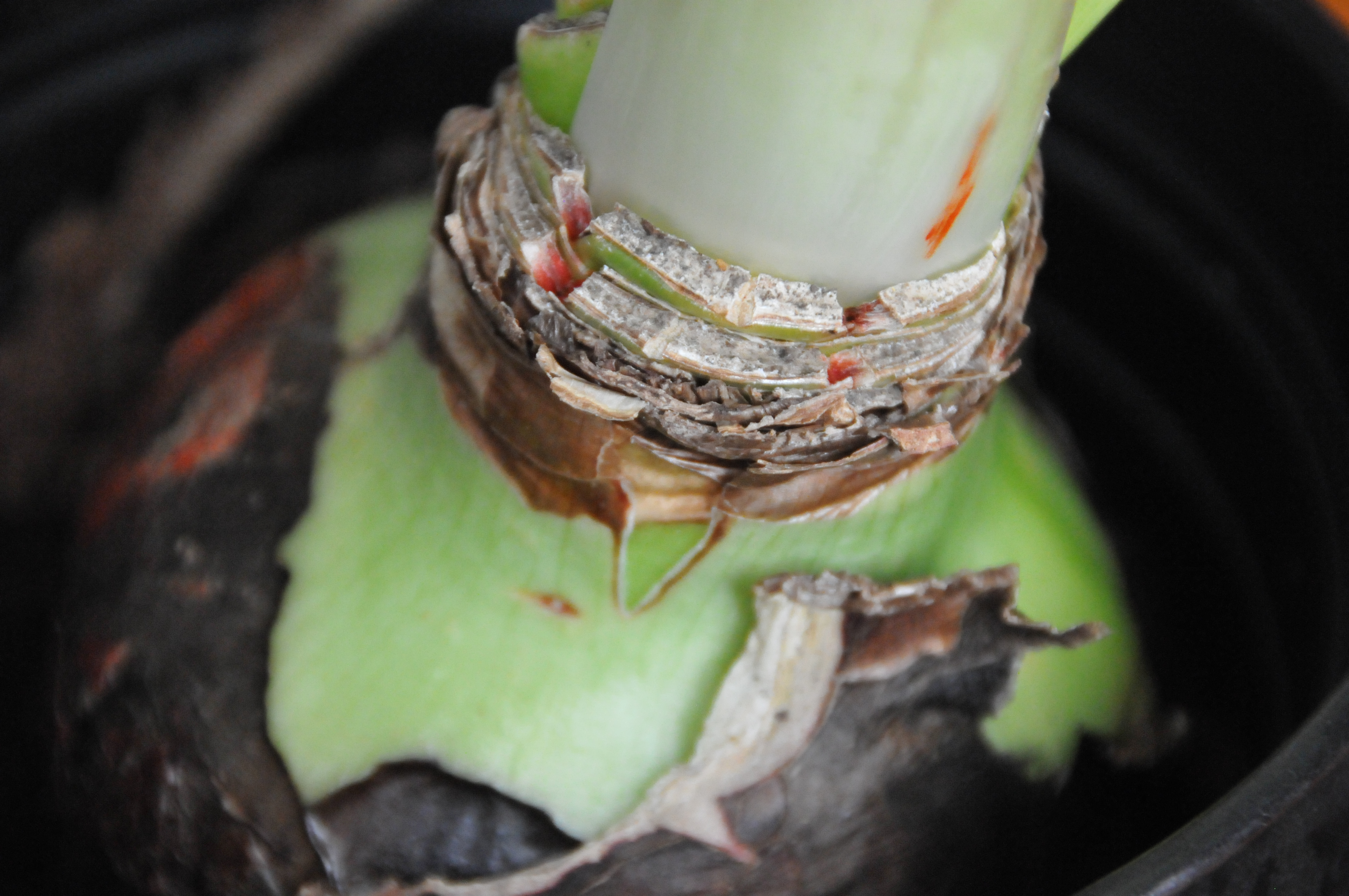
Hippeastrum bulb

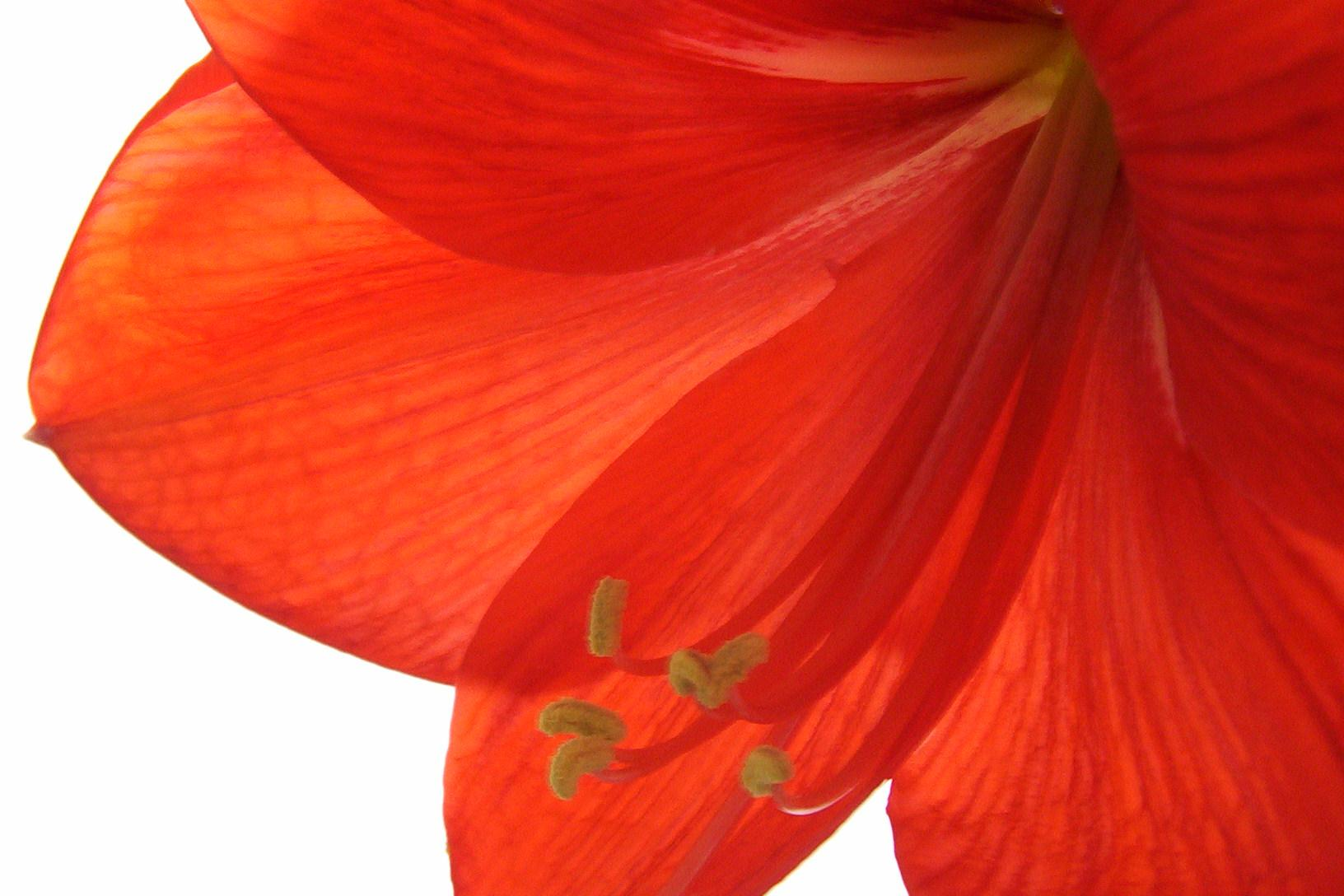
Detail of Hippeastrum flower

Hippeastrum (/ˌhɪpiːˈæstrəm/) is a genus of 116 species, and over 600 hybrids and cultivars, of perennial, herbaceous and bulbous plants, native to tropical and subtropical regions of the Americas, from Mexico south to Argentina and on some islands in the Caribbean. The majority have large, fleshy bulbs and tall, broad, strap-like leaves that are (generally) evergreen, and large red or purple flowers. Numerous colors and cultivars have been created over the past hundred years.

Hippeastrum is a genus in the family Amaryllidaceae (subfamily Amaryllidoideae, tribe Hippeastreae, and subtribe Hippeastrinae). For many years, there has been confusion among botanists, as well as collectors and the general public, over the generic names Amaryllis and Hippeastrum; the former is a South African genus of plants, while the latter is a new world genus. However, the common name "amaryllis" has been used for Hippeastrum for years, especially for the ornamental cultivars (sold as indoor flowering bulbs around November and December, for Christmas, in the Northern Hemisphere). Within the genus Hippeastrum exist many epiphytic species, as well, which may be found living in natural debris and leaf litter on the crooks of tree branches; by comparison, Amaryllis is a primarily terrestrial, southern African genus of perennial bulbs.

== Description ==
Hippeastrum striatum in cultivation

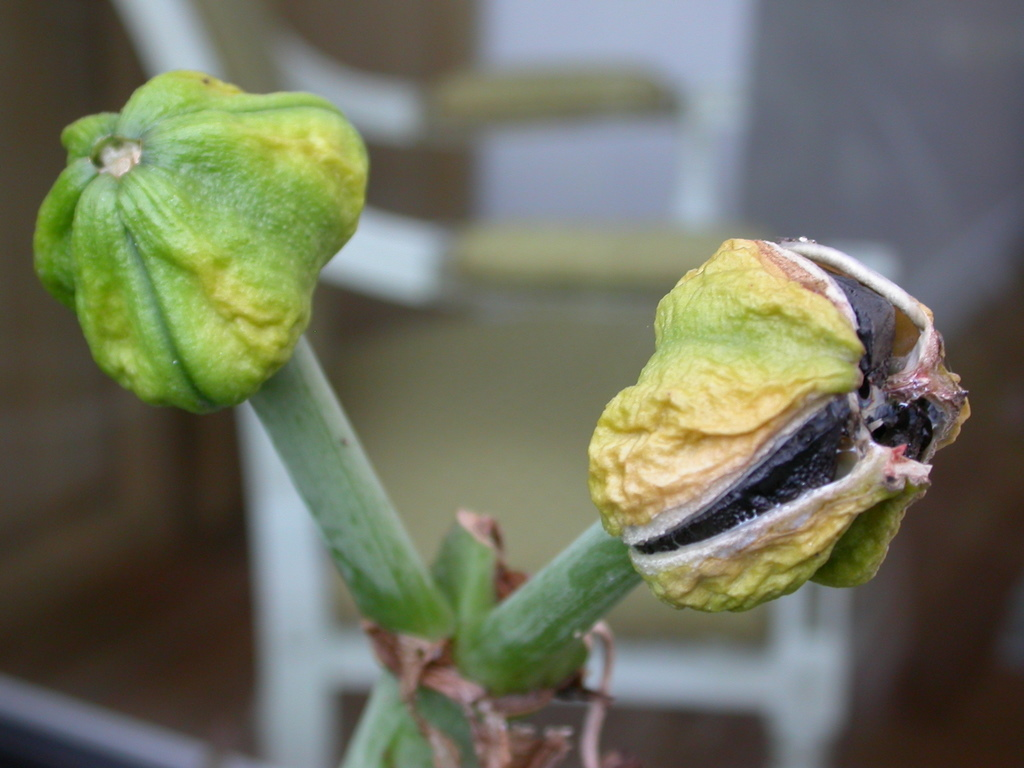
Hippeastrum: Trivalvar Capsule

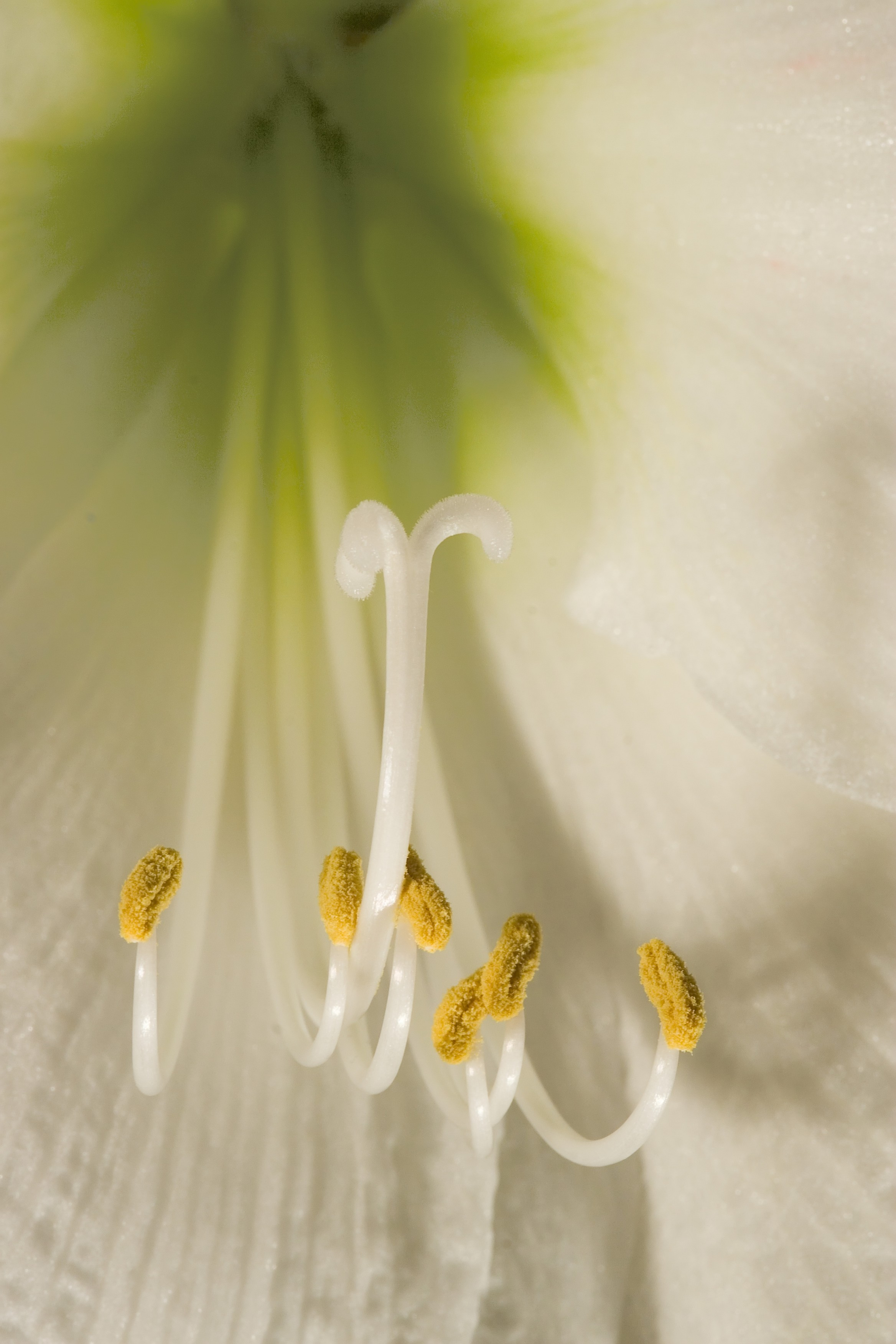
Hippeastrum: Pistil and stamens

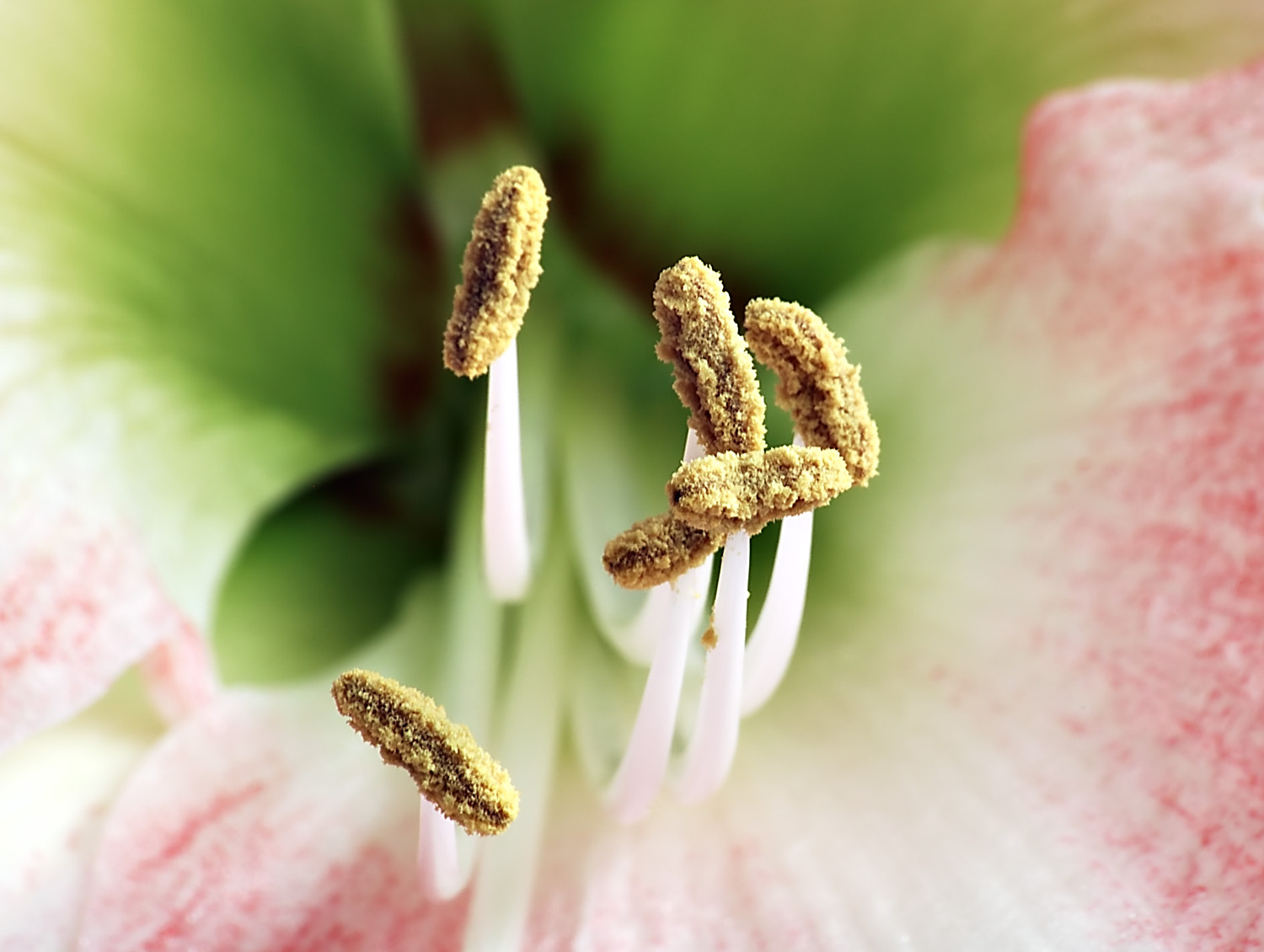
Hippeastrum: Stamens with filaments (white) ending in anthers carrying pollen

Most Hippeastrum bulbs are tunicate (a protective dry outer layer and fleshy concentric inner scales or leaf bases). The bulbs are generally between 5–12 cm (2"–5") in diameter and produce two to seven long-lasting evergreen or deciduous leaves that are 30–90 cm (12"–36") long and 2.5–5 cm (1"–2") wide. The leaves are hysteranthous (develop after flowering), sessile (borne directly from the stem or peduncle), rarely persistent and subpetiolate.

The flowers are arranged in umbelliform inflorescences which are pauciflor or pluriflor (2-14 flowers), supported on an erect hollow scape (flower stem) which is 20–75 cm (12"–30") tall and 2.5–5 cm (1"–2") in diameter with two free bracts forming a spathe which is bivalve with free leaflets at its base. Depending on the species, there are two to fifteen large showy flowers, which are more or less zygomorphic and hermaphrodite. Each flower is 13–20 cm (5"–8") across, and the native species are usually purple or red. They are funnelform (funnel shaped) and declinate (curving downwards and then upwards at the tip) in shape. The perianth has six brightly colored tepals (three outer sepals and three inner petals) that may be similar in appearance or very different. The perianth segments are subequal or unequal. The tepals are united at the base to form a short tube, usually with a rudimentary scaly paraperigonium with fimbriae or a callose ridge present at the throat.

The androecium consists of six stamens with filiform (thread like) filaments, which are fasciculate (in close bundles) and declinate or ascendent. The anthers are dorsifixed or versatile. In the gynaecium, the ovary is inferior and trilocular with pluriovulate locules. The style is filiform, and the stigma trifid. The fruit forms a trivalve capsule containing seeds which are dry, flattened, obliquely winged or irregularly discoid, hardly ever turgid, and globose (spherical) or subglobose, with a brown or black phytomelanous testa.

== Etymology ==
The name Hippeastrum was first given to the genus by Herbert, being derived from the Ancient Greek, meaning a "knight's star" from ἱππεύς (hippeus, mounted knight) and ἄστρον (astron, star), to describe the first recognized species, Hippeastrum reginae. Herbert proposed to call the genus, which he distinguished from Linnaeus' Amaryllis, Hippeastrum, or "knight's-star-lily". He states;

"I have named [them] Hippeastrum or Knights-star-lily, pursuing the idea which gave rise to the name Equestris" (p.12).

Herbert's fourteen species included this Hippeastrum equestre. This 'equine' connection refers to Carl Linnaeus the Younger who had named (in an unpublished manuscript) a West Indian species as Amaryllis equestris, because of its similarity to the African genus Amaryllis. This name and attribution was first published by William Aiton in 1789, in his Hortus Kewensis. Which species this was is not known precisely. However, in 1795 William Curtis, described Amaryllis equestris or the Barbados lily in his Botanical Magazine, referring to Aiton:

"The spatha is composed of two leaves, which standing up at a certain period of the plant's flowering like ears, give to the whole flower a fancied resemblance of a horse's head; whether LINNÆUS derived his name of equestris from this circumstance or not, he does not condescend to inform us."

In 1803 John Sims claimed Curtis had made a mistake in this attribution, and that:

"this name was given from the remarkable likeness the front view of it has to a star of some of the orders of knight-hood; an appearance well expressed by JACQUIN's figure in the Hortus Schoenbrunnensis"

Despite much speculation, there is no definitive explanation of either Linnaeus fils or Herbert's thinking. For instance the 'knight's star' has been compared to Linnaeus' decoration as a Knight of the Order of the Polar Star. The Latin word equestris (of a knight, or horseman) may have been confused with equi (of a horse), or possibly Herbert was making a literary knight's move on the Linnaean term. The flower name has even been compared to the mediaeval weapon, the spoked mace or Morning Star which it superficially resembles.

=== Common name ===
Although the 1987 decision settled the question of the scientific name of the genus, the common name "amaryllis" continues to be used. Bulbs sold as amaryllis and described as ready to bloom for the holidays belong to the genus Hippeastrum. "Amaryllis" is also used in the name of some societies devoted to the genus Hippeastrum. Separate common names are used to describe the genus Amaryllis, e.g., "Naked Lady".

== Taxonomy ==
=== Separation of Hippeastrum from Amaryllis ===
The taxonomy of the genus is complicated. The first issue is whether the name should more properly be Amaryllis L.. In 1753 Carl Linnaeus created the name Amaryllis belladonna, the type species of the genus Amaryllis, in his Species Plantarum along with eight other Amaryllis species. (Note: Linnaeus' original species of Amaryllis were: A. lutea, A. atamasco, A. formossissima, A. belladonna, A. sarniensis, A. zeylanica, A. longifolia, A. orientalis and A. guttata. All of these were subsequently assigned to different genera) Linnaeus had earlier worked on the Estate of George Clifford near Haarlem between 1735 and 1737 describing the plants growing there in his Hortus Cliffortianus in 1738. It is to this work that he refers in his Species Plantarum. This was assumed to be the South African Cape Belladonna, although not precisely known. Clifford's herbarium is now preserved at the Natural History Museum in London.

At the time both South African and South American plants were placed in this same genus. By the early nineteenth century Amaryllis had become a polymorphic (diverse) genus with about 50 species from what we would consider a dozen genera today, and attempts were made to separate it into different genera. This work commenced in 1819 with the contributions of the English botanist, the Revd. William Herbert in Curtis's Botanical Magazine which he expanded in 1821 in The Botanical Register, identifying 14 species of the new genus of Hippeastrum, and only leaving three species in Amaryllis. The rest of the Amaryllis species he transferred to other genera, several of which he created. Herbert further refined his descriptions of Hippeastrum in his work on the Amaryllidaceae in 1837.

=== Nomenclature debate ===
Since then, a key question has been whether Linnaeus's original type was a South African plant (now Amaryllis) or a South American plant (now Hippeastrum). If the latter, the correct name for the genus Hippeastrum would then be Amaryllis and a new name would need to be found for the South African genus. In 1938 Johannes Cornelius Theodorus Uphof (JCT Uphof) claimed, with some evidence, that the plant was in fact the South American Hippeastrum equestre (Linn. fil.) Herb. (syn. Amaryllis equestris (Linn. fil.) ex Aiton, accepted name H. puniceum) a plant which Carl Linnaeus' son, Linnaeus the Younger (Linn. fil.) had described c. 1781-83 (unpublished) but soon after appearing in the Hortus Kewensis of 1789. This paper sparked a debate over the next half century, that delayed the official transfer of species from Amaryllis to Hippeastrum. This debate involved botanists on both sides of the Atlantic and the outcome was a decision by the 14th International Botanical Congress in 1987 that Amaryllis L. should be a nomen conservandum (conserved name, i.e., correct regardless of priority) and ultimately based on a specimen of the South African Amaryllis belladonna from the Clifford Herbarium. Thus Amaryllis L. is the correct name for the South African genus, not the South American genus (Hippeastrum).

=== Claim for Leopoldia ===
The second issue is whether the name should be Leopoldia. In 1819 Herbert had proposed Leopoldia as a nomen provisorium (provisional name) for the same taxon as he called Hippeastrum in 1821. Although Leopoldia was subsequently validated (i.e., became the correct name), this was overlooked, and Hippeastrum rather than Leopoldia was used for the genus of New World amaryllids. Following Filippo Parlatore in 1845, the name Leopoldia was used for a genus of grape hyacinth species, allied to Muscari. In order to preserve the widespread usage of both Hippeastrum and Leopoldia, Fabio Garbari and Werner Greuter proposed in 1970 that Herbert's Hippeastrum and Parlatore's Leopoldia should be conserved and Herbert's Leopoldia rejected. This was accepted and Hippeastrum Herb. is now a nomen conservandum (conserved name), i.e., the correct name regardless of the fact that it does not have priority over Leopoldia. (The genus Leopoldia is now placed within Muscari, for example as Muscari subg. Leopoldia.)

=== Intergeneric hybrids ===
While interspecific hybrids of Hippeastrum are relatively common, hybridization with other genera of Amaryllidaceae are more rare. The most conspicuous exception is the hybrid obtained through crossbreeding with the Mexican Sprekelia formosissima (St James's lily, Aztec lily, Jacobean lily), another member of the tribe Hippeastreae, originally called Amaryllis formosissima, which is apomictic. × Hippeastrelia is the name given to this cross.

=== Subgenera ===
A number of subgenera have been proposed over the years. For instance in the 1870s and 1880s John Gilbert Baker considerably reorganised Hippeastrum. In 1878 he described nine sections of the genus, but by 1888 he included seven subgenera, namely (number of species in parentheses) Habranthus (10), Phycella (3), Rhodophiala (5), Macropododastrum (1), Omphalissa (6), Aschamia (10) and Lais (3), some of which have since been treated as separate genera (Habranthus, Rhodophiala). Baker both reduced the original number of species of Herbert, but also enlarged the genus by adding in other genera such as Habranthus, Phycella, Rhodophiala and Rhodolirion (also called Rhodolirium, and subsequently moved to Rhodophilia), which he included as separate sections of Hippeastrum. In addition, he included many new species being discovered in South America, particularly Chile. His 1878 classification included 47 species, reduced to 38 by 1888. These subgenera were not widely used due to indistinct boundaries of some of the divisions. For reference, these were:

- Aschamia (Salisb.) Baker (e.g. H. reginae, H. andreanum, H. scopulorum, H. mandonii, H. leopoldii, H. reticulatum, H. stylosum)
- Cephaleon Traub (e.g. H. machupijchense)
- Lais (Salisb.) Baker (e.g. H. striatum, H. vittatum, H. breviflorum)
- Macropodastrum Baker (e.g. H. elegans)
- Omphalissa (Salisb.) Baker (e.g. H. aulicum, H. psittacinum, H. calyptratum, H. cybister, H. pardinum, H. miniatum, H. iguazuanum)
- Sealyana Traub (e.g.: H. reticulatum)

Following a major recircumscription of Hippeastreae, Hippeastrum was once again formally divided into two subgenera, by the inclusion of the three species of Tocantina:

- Hippeastrum subg. Tocantinia (Ravenna) Nic.García (3)
- Hippeastrum subg. Hippeastrum (autonym) (~100)

=== Selected species ===
As of January 2025, Plants of the World Online accepts 116 species. Garcia et al. (2019) estimate approximately 100 species in subgenus Hippeastrum, together with 3 in subgenus Tocantinia.

- Hippeastrum angustifolium Pax
- Hippeastrum arboricola (Ravenna) Meerow
- Hippeastrum aulicum (Ker Gawl.) Herb.
- Hippeastrum aviflorum (Ravenna) Dutilh
- Hippeastrum calyptratum (Ker Gawl.) Herb.
- Hippeastrum canterai Arechav.
- Hippeastrum correiense (Bury) Worsley
- Hippeastrum cybister (Herb.) Benth. ex Baker
- Hippeastrum evansiae (Traub & I.S.Nelson) H.E.Moore
- Hippeastrum ferreyrae (Traub) Gereau & Brako
- Hippeastrum iguazuanum (Ravenna) T.R.Dudley & M.Williams
- Hippeastrum leopoldii T.Moore
- Hippeastrum miniatum (Ruiz & Pav.) Herb.
- Hippeastrum papilio (Ravenna) Van Scheepen
- Hippeastrum pardinum (Hook.f.) Dombrain
- Hippeastrum petiolatum Pax
- Hippeastrum psittacinum (Ker Gawl.) Herb.
- Hippeastrum puniceum (Lam.) Voss. Syn. H. equestre (Aiton)
- Hippeastrum reginae (L.) Herb.
- Hippeastrum striatum (Lam.) H.E.Moore syn. H. rutilum (Ker Gawl.) Herb.
- Hippeastrum reticulatum (L'Hér.) Herb. syn. H. striatifolium (Sims)
- Hippeastrum vittatum (L'Hér.) Herb.

Unplaced names include Hippeastrum ugentii, considered in the Kew World Checklist of Selected Plant Families as probably a Crinum.

Hybrids include Hippeastrum ×johnsonii.

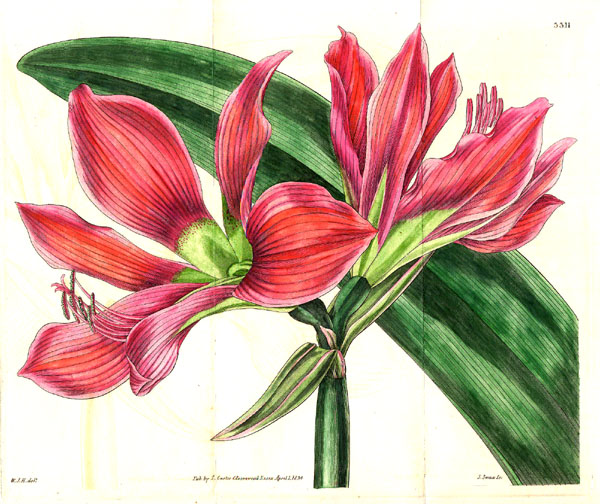
Hippeastrum aulicum

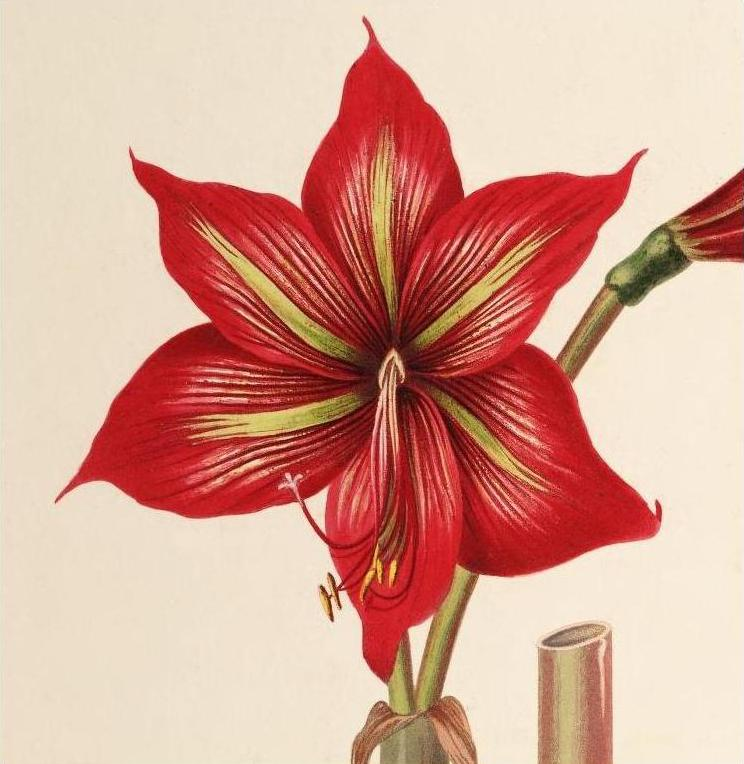
Hippeastrum correiense

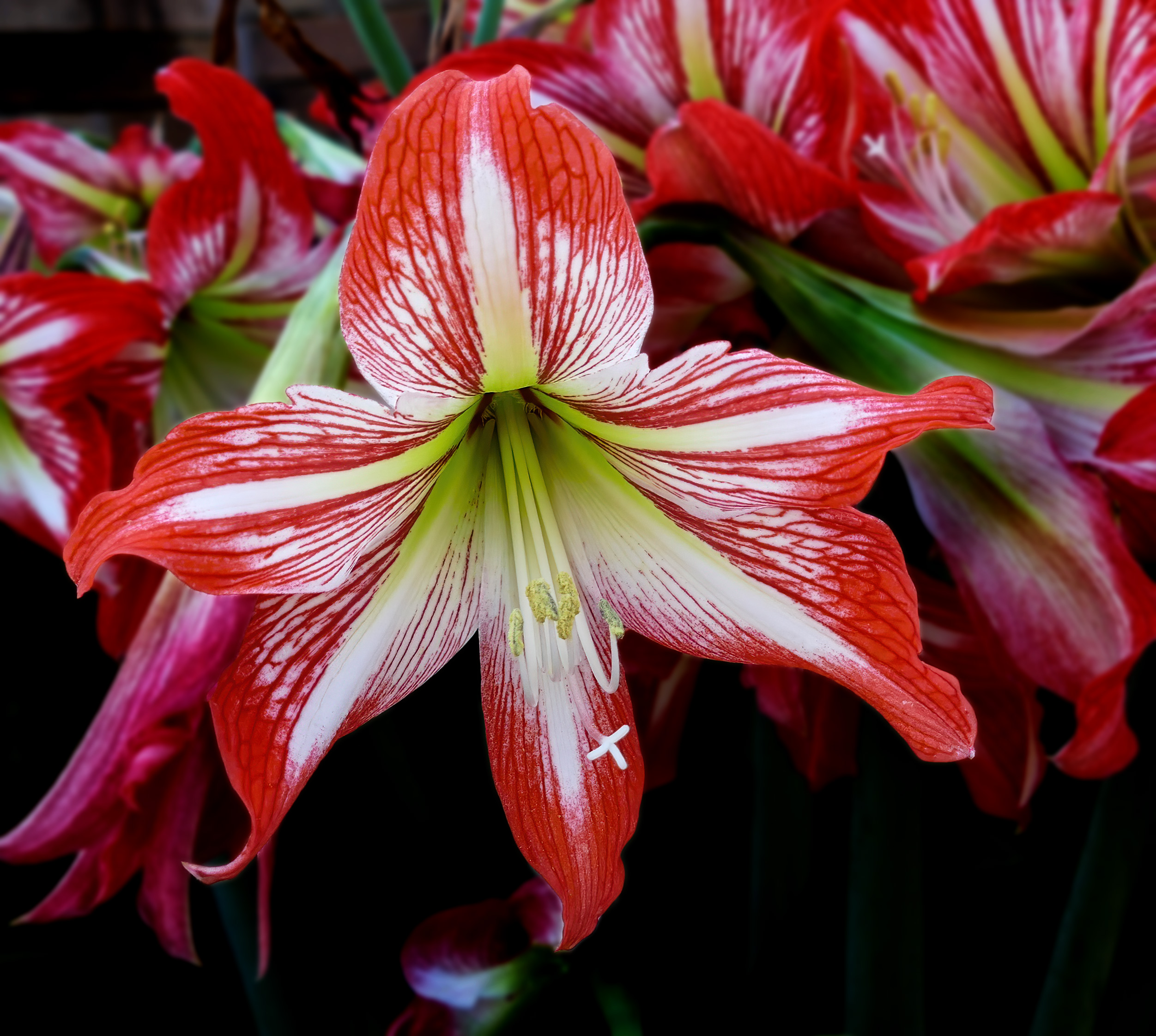
Hippeastrum correiense

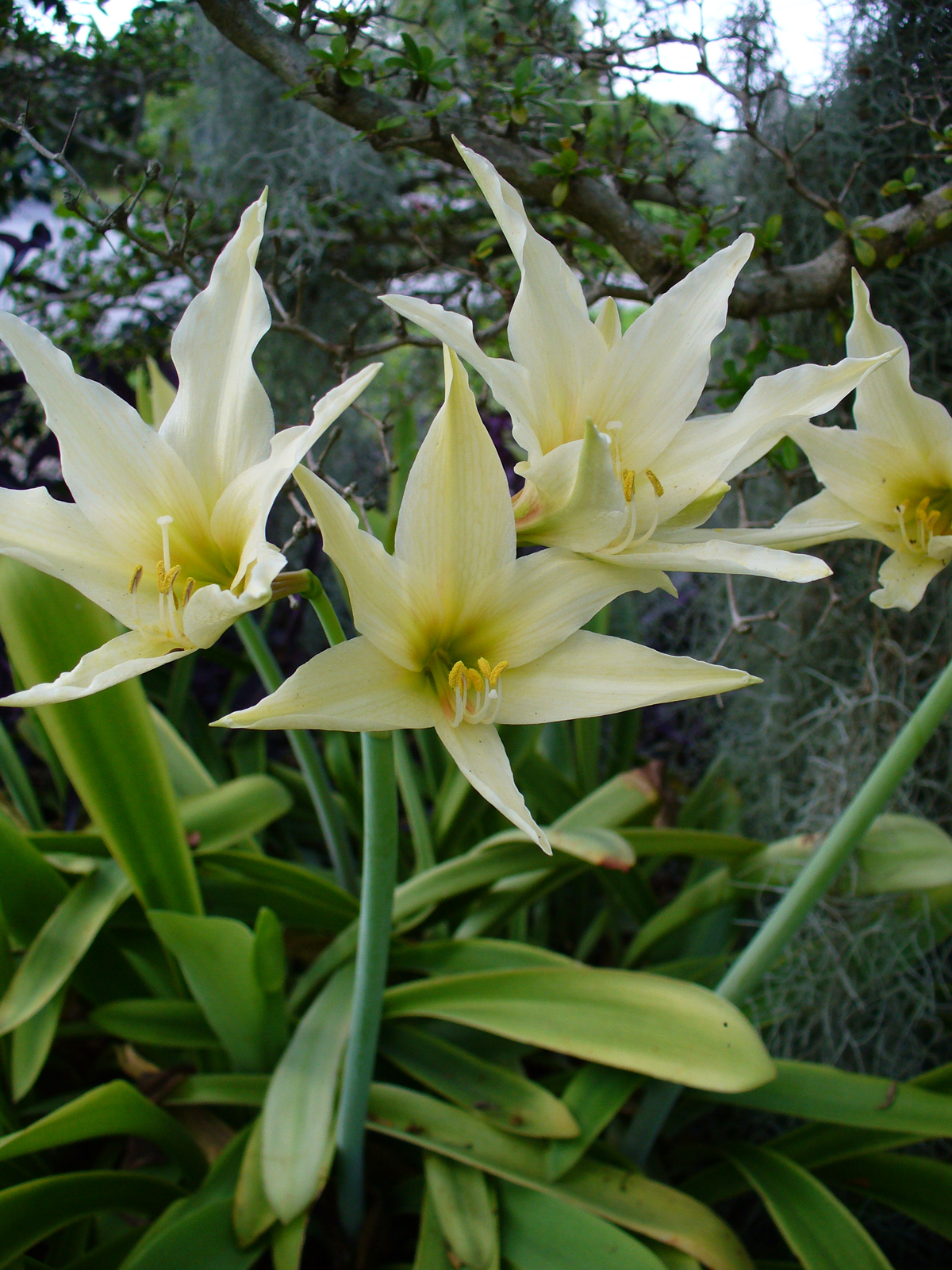
Hippeastrum evansiae

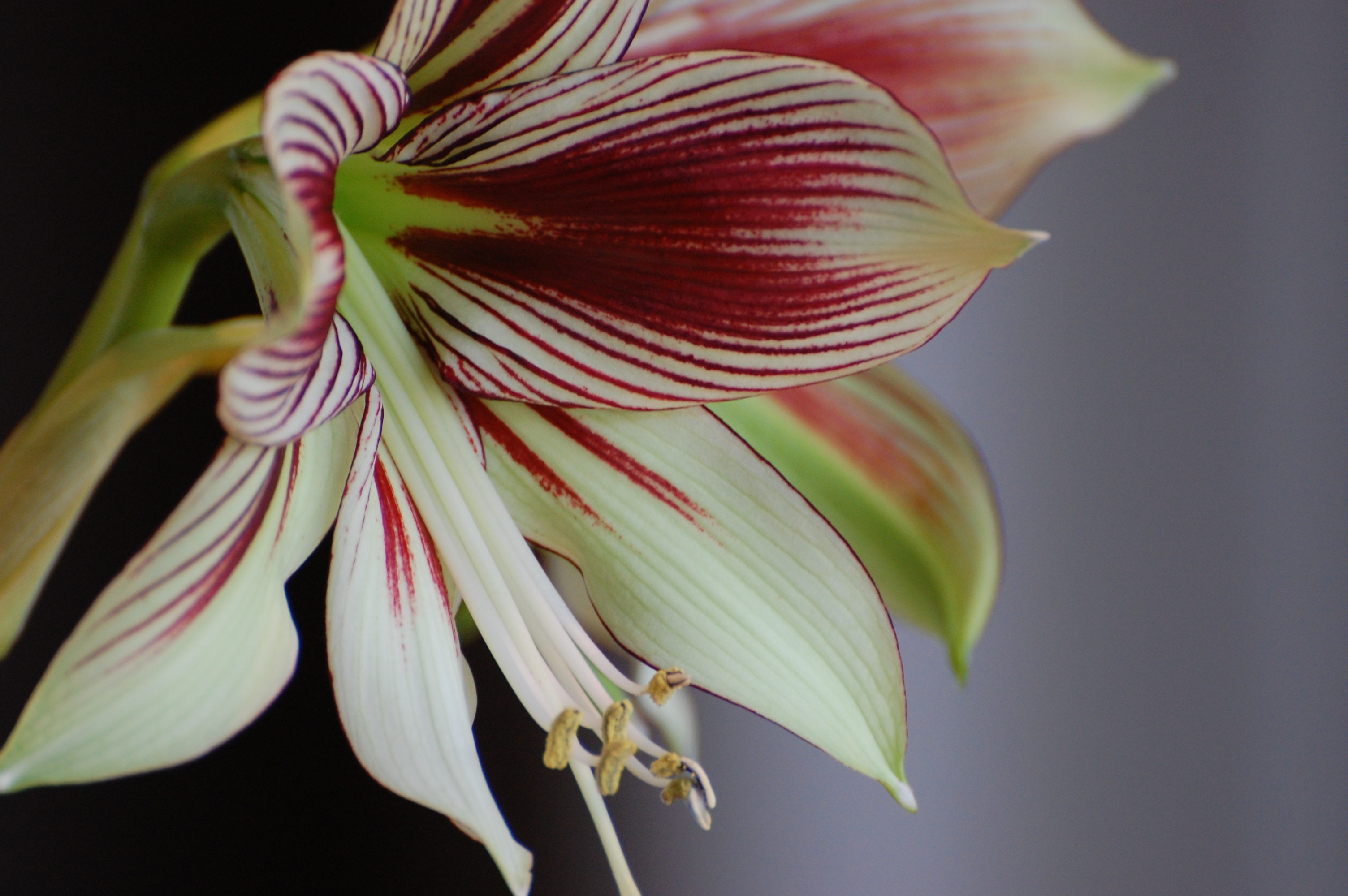
Hippeastrum papilio

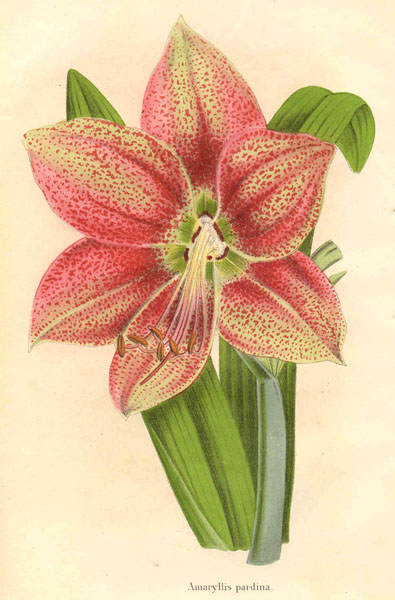
Hippeastrum pardinum by Charles Jacques Édouard Morren 1867

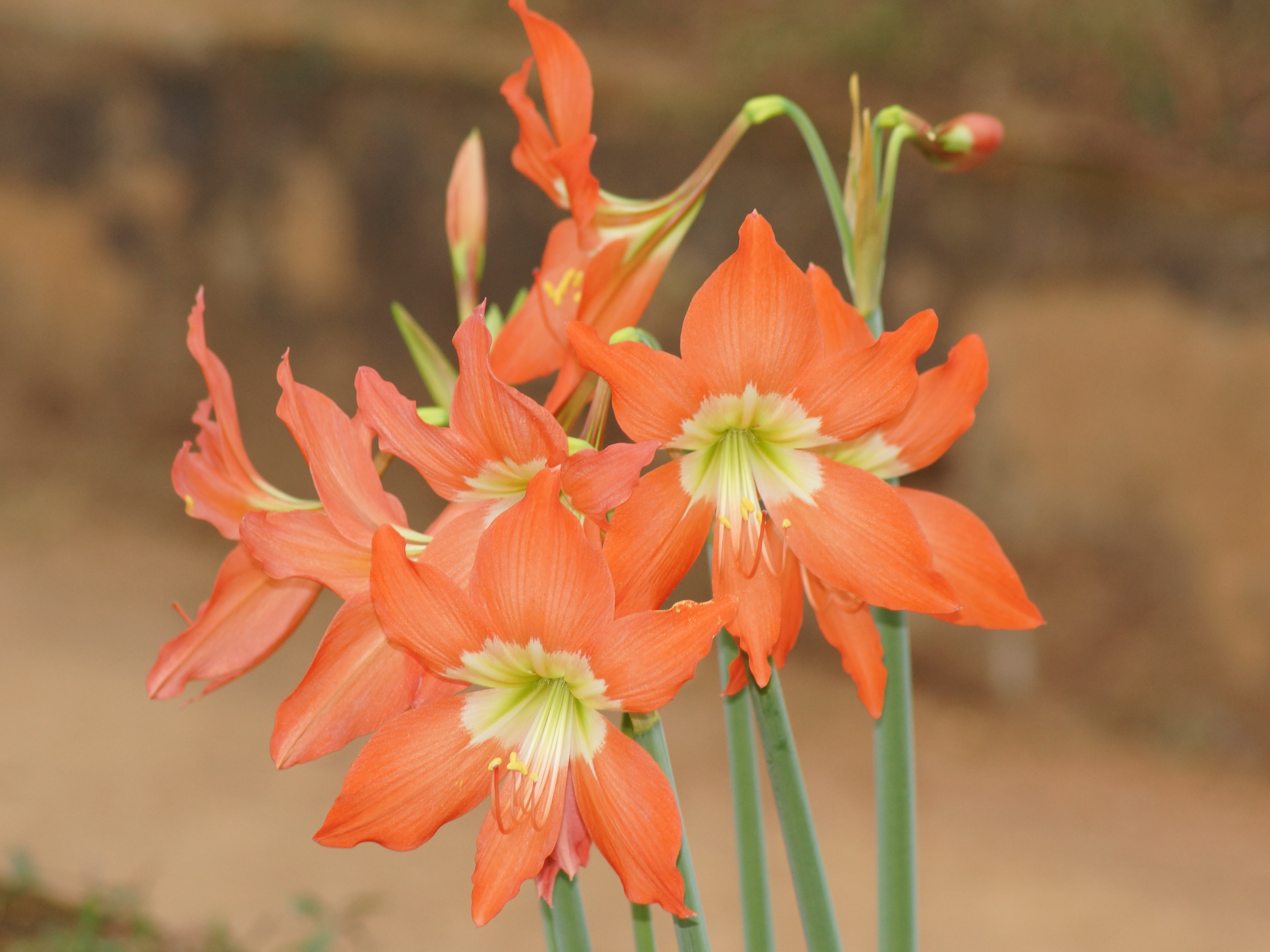
Hippeastrum puniceum

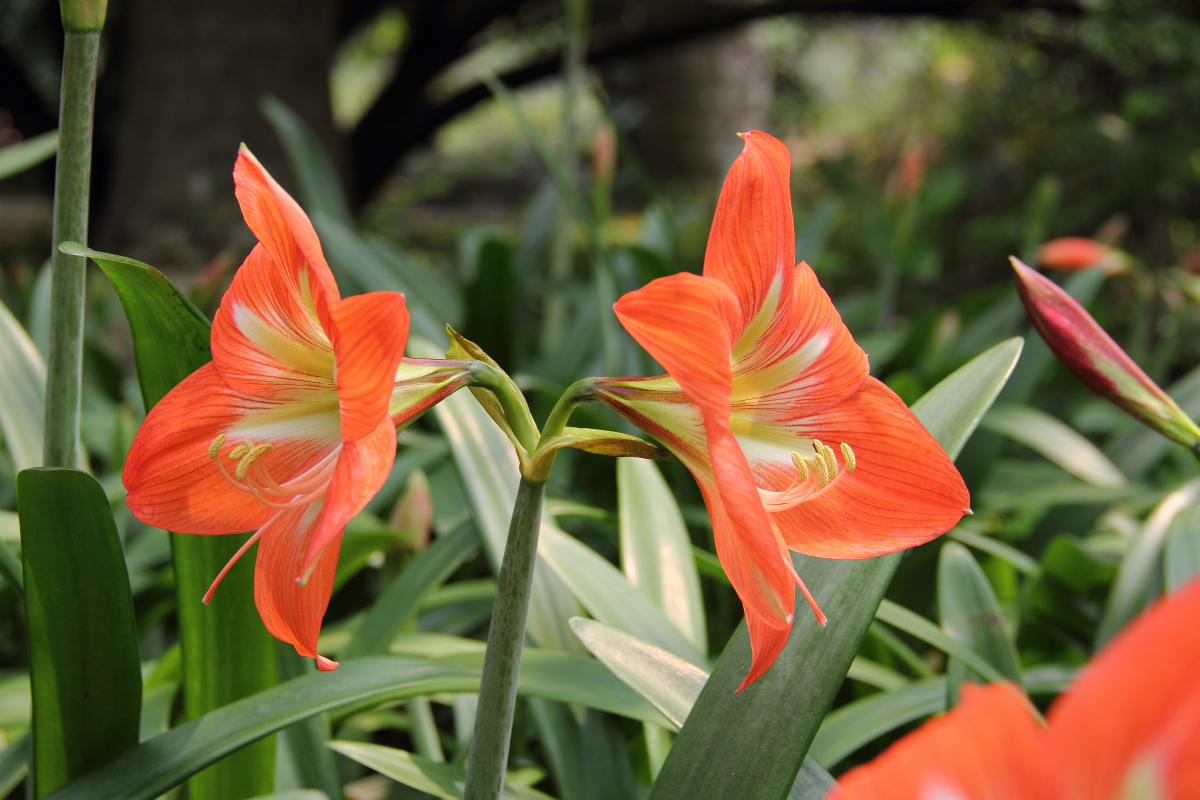
Hippeastrum striatum

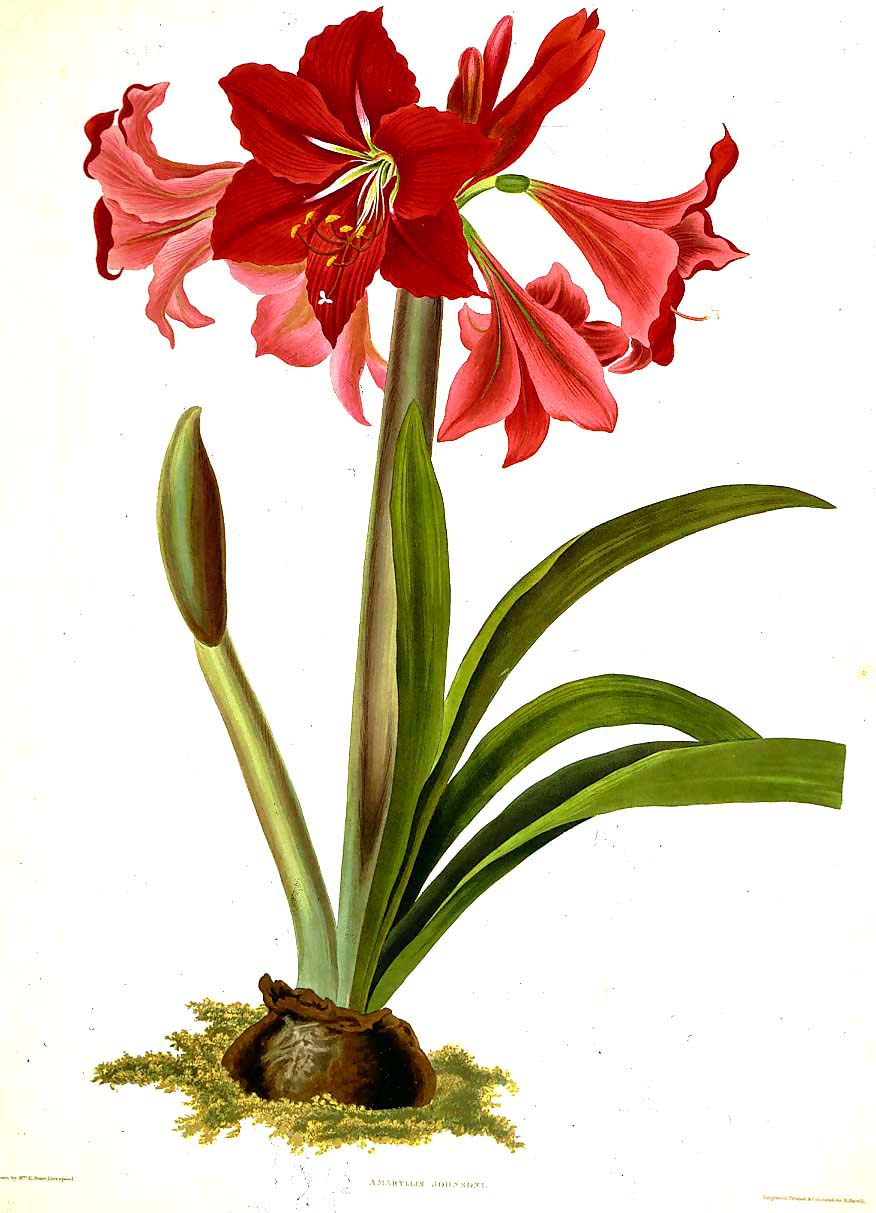
Hippeastrum ×johnsonii by Priscilla Susan Bury

== Distribution and habitat ==
Hippeastrum species are concentrated in two centres of diversity, the main one in Eastern Brazil and the other in the central southern Andes of Peru, Bolivia and Argentina, on the eastern slopes and nearby foothills. Some species are found as far north as Mexico and the West Indies. The genus is thought to have originated in Brazil where at least 34 of the species have been found. Their habitat is mainly tropical and subtropical, though those species found south of the equator, or at sufficient altitude may be considered temperate. Hippeastrum is found in a wide range of habitats. Many are found in underbrush, while others prefer full sun. Hippeastrum angustifolium is an example of a species preferring flood areas, while other species prefer a drier habitat. There are also epiphytic species, such as Hippeastrum aulicum, Hippeastrum calyptratum, Hippeastrum papilio, and Hippeastrum arboricola, which require air circulation around their roots.

== Ecology ==
=== Reproduction ===
Species are generally diploid with 2n=22 chromosomes, but some species, such as Hippeastrum iguazuanum, have 24. The genus has a degree of interspecies intercompatibility allowing crossing.

Some species, such as the Uruguayan Hippeastrum petiolatum, are sterile and unable to produce seeds. H. petiolatum is a sterile triploid that reproduces asexually, producing many bulbils around the mother bulb. These are light, and easily carried on the surface of water ensuring distribution of the species during the rainy season. Other species such as Hippeastrum reticulatum are self-pollinating, reproducing by distributing seed. Although this does not guarantee genetic diversity in natural populations, it is widely used by colonising species. These two examples are not however typical of the genus, which commonly reproduces through allogamy. One mechanism that limits self-pollination is that of self-incompatibility by which seeds are only produced by pollination from other plants. Furthermore, the plant generally releases its pollen about two days before its stigma is receptive, making cross-pollination more likely. Pollinators include hummingbirds in subtropical areas, and moths.

=== Pests ===
Hippeastrum species are used as food plants by the larvae of some Lepidoptera species including Spodoptera picta (crinum grub) as well as Pseudococcidae (mealybugs), large, and small narcissus bulb flies (Eumerus strigatus and E. funeralis), thrips, mites, aphids, snails and slugs. A fungal disease attacking Hippeastrum is Stagonospora curtisii (red blotch, red leaf spot or red fire). The leaves are also eaten by grasshoppers, and grasshoppers commonly plant egg pods in the ground near Hippeastrum bulbs, which erupt in the spring, covering the plant with nymphs.

=== Conservation ===
The following species were considered threatened or vulnerable by degradation of their natural habitat, according to the International Union for Conservation of Nature (IUCN) Red List of Threatened Species in 1997.

- Hippeastrum arboricolum (Argentina)
- Hippeastrum aviflorum (Argentina)
- Hippeastrum canterai (Uruguay)
- Hippeastrum ferreyrae (Peru)
- Hippeastrum petiolatum (Argentina & Brazil)

== Cultivation ==
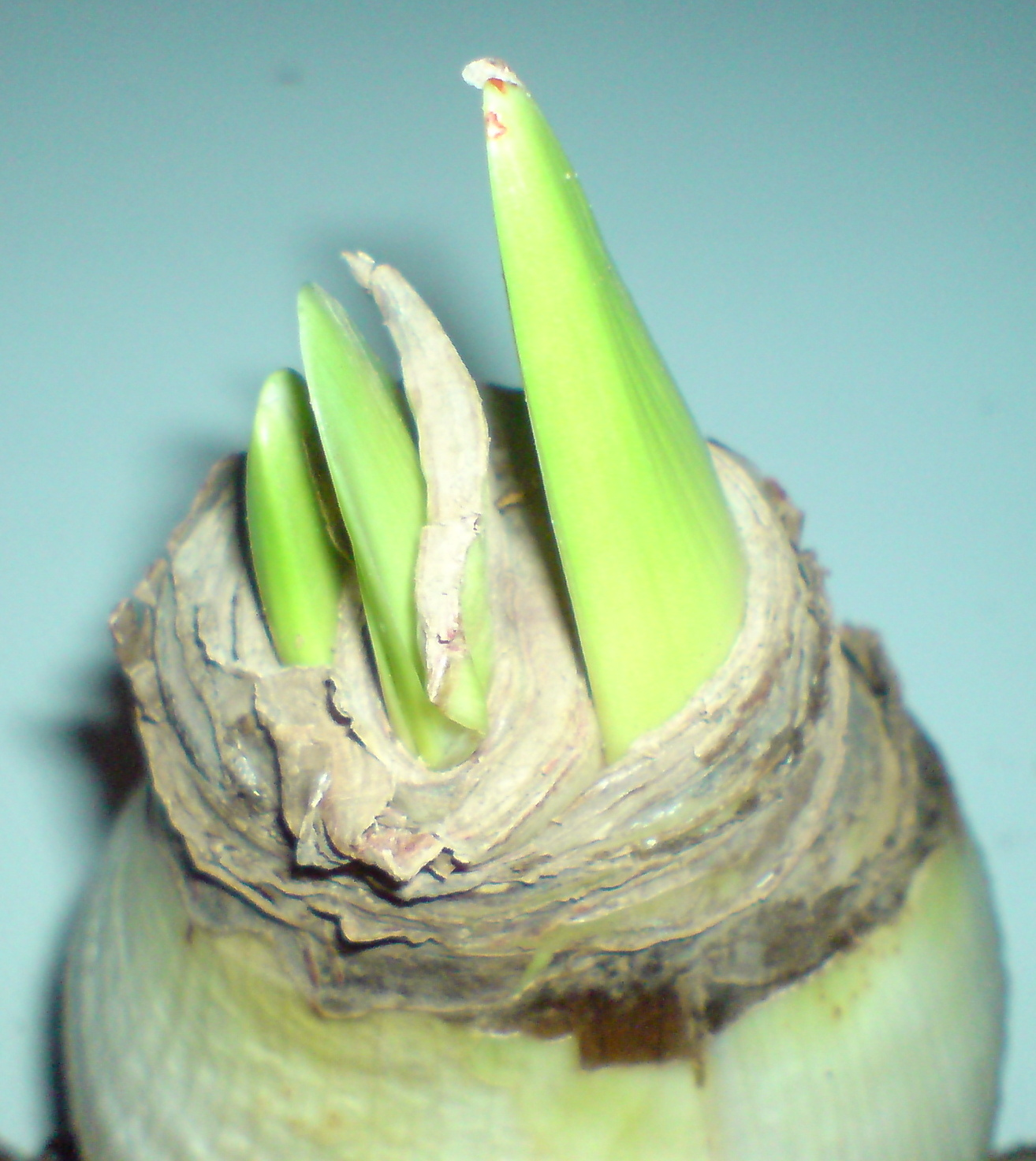
Hippeastrum bulb, with young shoot

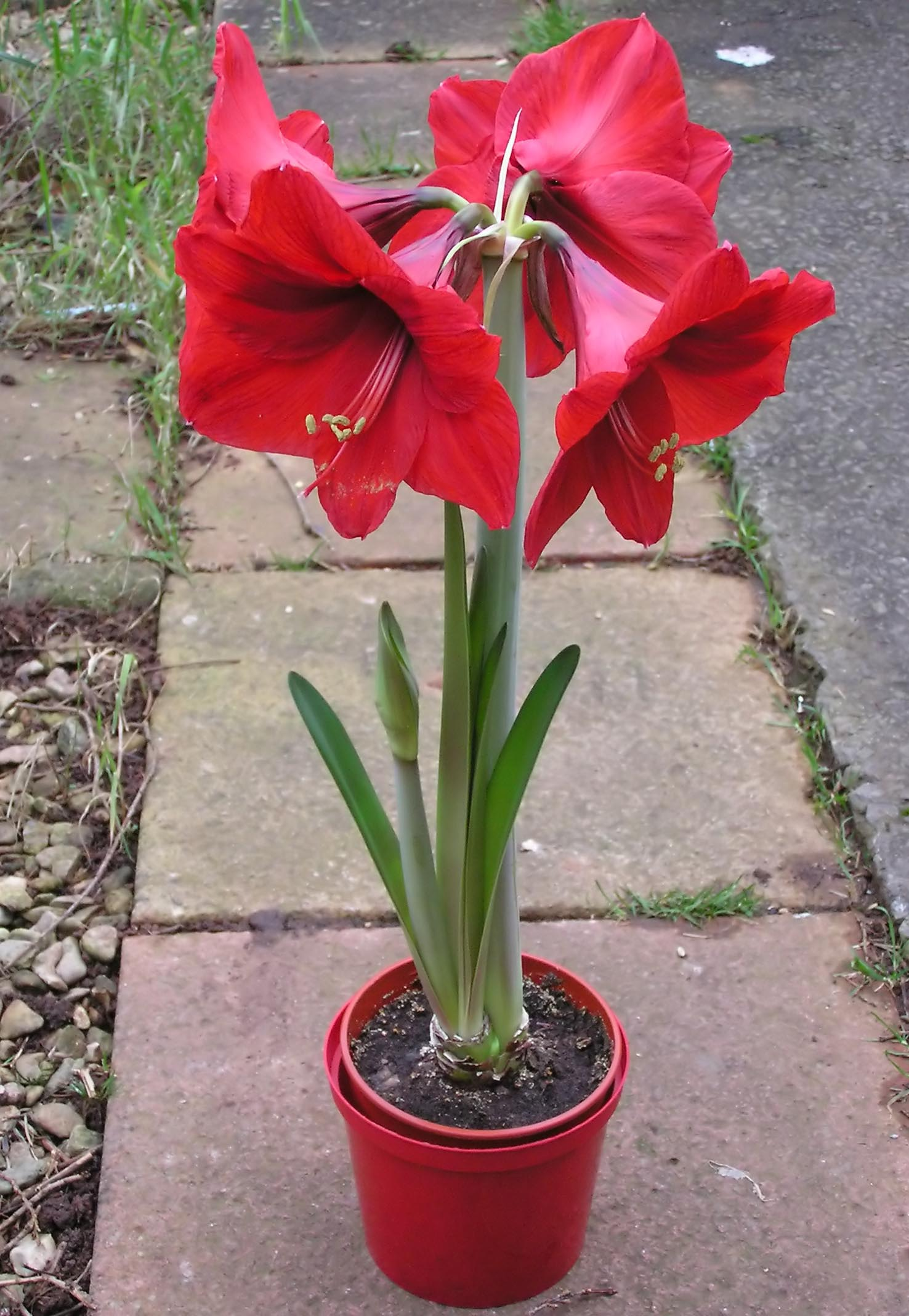
Hippeastrum grown in pot

Hippeastrum cultivars and species can be grown inside in pots or outside in warmer climates (Hardiness 7B-11). Many will bloom year after year provided they are given a dormant period in a cool, dark place for two months without water or fertilizer although some bulbs will start growing before the two-month period is up.

The bulb is tender and should not be exposed to frost, but is otherwise easy to grow with large rewards for small efforts, especially those that bloom inside during the winter months. Note too, that Hippeastrum can also be grown in the ground in temperate areas. Bulbs are usually sold in fall for early winter bloom. Bare-root bulbs do best planted in a pot only slightly larger than the circumference of the bulb in well-drained, organic mix (such as sterilized potting soil plus coir fiber, or equal amounts of peat moss, sand and humus), with one third of the bulb visible above the surface of the soil and two thirds buried.

After planting, sprouting requires a warm place (about 20 °C). Bulbs need light watering until the leaves and buds emerge, and need to be situated in a well-lit, cool place and watered as needed to maintain moderate soil moisture. Overwatering will cause bulb and root rot. Plants may be fed with common fertilizers that contain iron and magnesium. Blooming takes place about two months after planting. The plant's leaves should continue to grow after the flowers have faded. Summering outdoors in four or five hours of direct sunlight, plus fertilizing lightly as the season progresses, will help develop buds for the next year.

=== Breeding and propagation ===
Intense cultivation of a number of species, particularly from Brazil, Bolivia and Peru, has occurred because of the appearance and size of the flowers, resulting in many hybrids and cultivars.

=== History ===
Hippeastrum breeding began in 1799 when Arthur Johnson, a watchmaker in Prescot, England, crossed Hippeastrum reginae with Hippeastrum vittatum, obtaining hybrids that were later given the name Hippeastrum × 'Johnsonii' (Johnson's amaryllis, 'hardy amaryllis' or St. Joseph's lily). Johnson shared his work with the Liverpool Botanic Garden which was fortunate, since his greenhouse was destroyed in a fire. His hybrid was being cultivated in the US by the mid-nineteenth century. Many new hybrid lines followed as new species were sent to Europe from South America, the most important of which were Reginae and Leopoldii.

The Reginae strain hybrids were produced by Jan de Graaff and his two sons in the Netherlands in the mid-19th century by crossing Hippeastrum vitatum and Hippeastrum striatum with Hippeastrum psittacinum and some of the better hybrids available in Europe at the time. Some of the most successful hybrids were Graveana and Empress of India.

Leopoldii hybrids arose from the work of the British explorer and botanist Richard Pearce, an employee of James Veitch & Sons, a plant nursery. Pearce brought back specimens of Hippeastrum leopoldii and Hippeastrum pardinum from the Andes. These two species were notable for large flowers that were wide open and relatively symmetrical. Crossing these two species with the best of the Reginae strain produced a lineage of very large open flowered specimens, with up to 4–6 flowers on each scape. The Veitch nursery dominated the commercial development of Hippeastrum leopoldii and other varieties up to the early years of the twentieth century, the best of their hybrids setting the standard for modern commercial development.

The late 19th and early 20th centuries saw Hippeastrum breeding develop in the United States, particularly in Texas, California, and Florida in conjunction with the USDA (1910–1939). The major US contribution came from the work of Henry Nehrling and Theodore Mead, whose hybrids crossed with Dutch stock have produced some modern hybrids, although not matching the European strains.

In 1946, two Dutch growers moved to South Africa and began cultivation there. Although most cultivars of Hippeastrum come from the Dutch and South African sources, bulbs are now [when?] being developed in the United States, Japan, Israel, India, Brazil and Australia. Nurseries may list Hippeastrum bulbs as being 'Dutch', 'Israeli', 'Peruvian' etc., depending on the country of origin.

Most modern commercial hybrids are derived from the following species:

- H. vittatum
- H. leopoldii
- H. pardinum
- H. reginae
- H. puniceum
- H. aulicum

=== Propagation ===
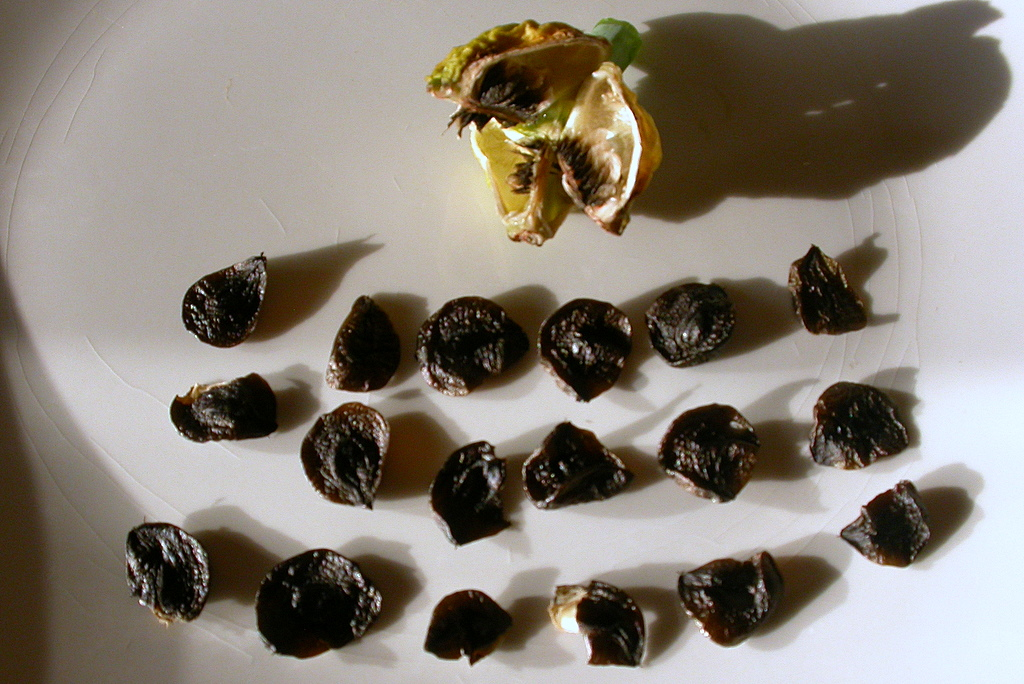
Hippeastrum seeds

Three main methods are used for propagating Hippeastrum: seeds, bulbils and 'twin scales'. More recently [when?], micropropagation in vitro has been used on a commercial scale.

==== Seeds ====
The seeds are contained in a thin dark brown/black paper like fleche, that might easily blow away with some wind. Seed multiplication may be used for the development of new cultivars or to increase the yield of native species. Seeds are generally sown in early summer in seedbeds, and then transplanted to larger containers. They require warmth, frequent watering, and should not be given a dormant period. Seeds do not breed true. Plants obtained from seeds take about six years to bloom.

==== Bulbils ====
Home propagation is best performed by using offset bulbils. Commercially, only cultivars that produce at least three bulbils on the mother bulb are used for this form of propagation. Plants grown from this method take three to four years to bloom.

==== Twin scales ====
The most common commercial propagation method is referred to as 'twin scales'. This involves the division of the bulb into 12 sections and then separating each section into twin scales connected by the basal plate. The cuttings that are derived from these are grown in moist vermiculite in the dark till bulbils appear. More recently [when?] growing them in sunlight has been found to produce a better crop.

==== In vitro ====
The technique of plant tissue culture in vitro improves the propagation of Hippeastrum by decreasing the time required to reach the minimum size to start the reproductive cycle, using sections of bulbs grown in artificial media with the addition of plant hormones.

=== Fragrance ===
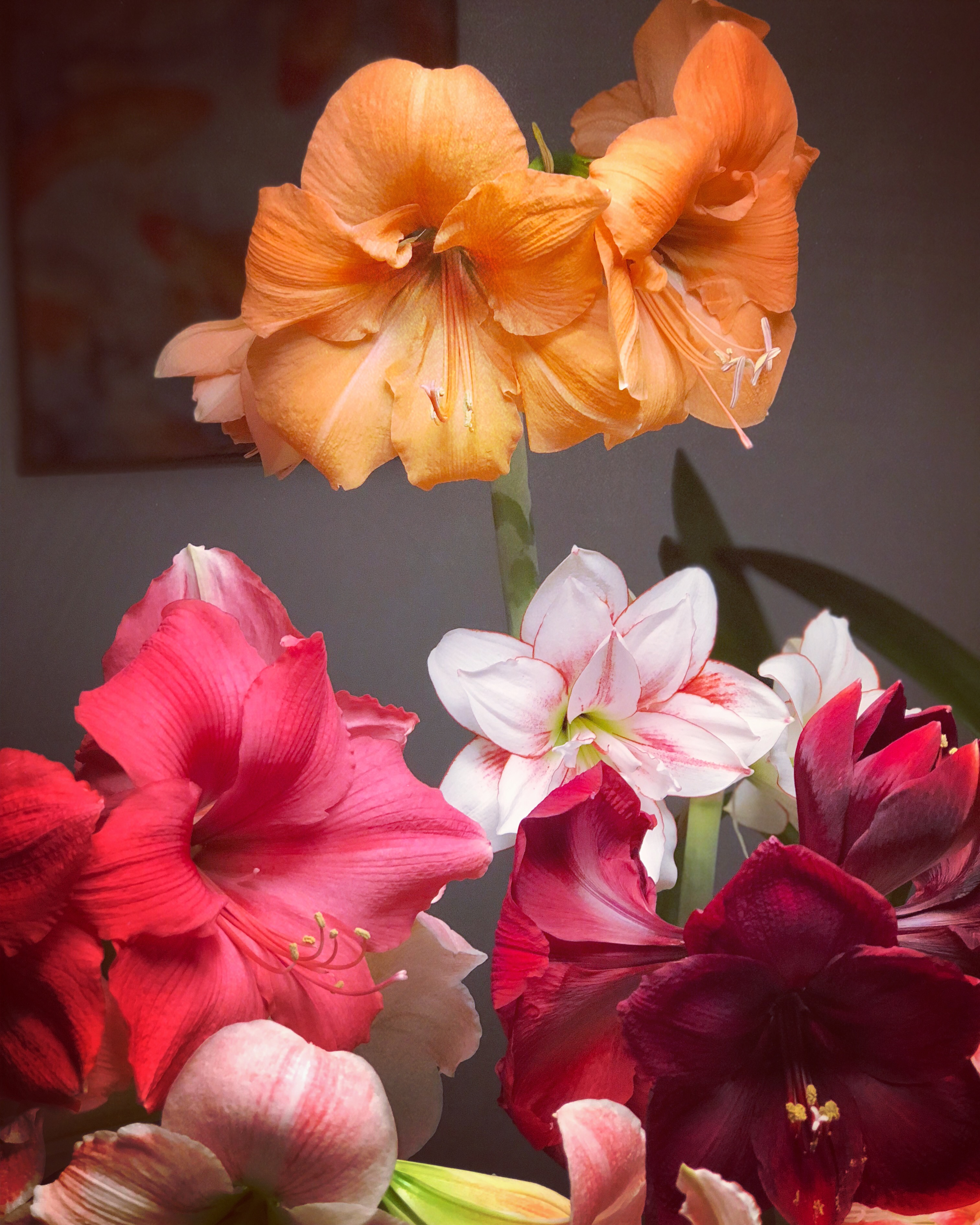

Most modern cultivars lack any fragrance, although 'Dancing Queen' represents an exception. Fragrance is genetically related to flower colour (white, or pastel shades) and is a recessive characteristic, so that when fragrant and non fragrant varieties are crossed, not all progeny will be fragrant, whereas two fragrant progenitors will produce an all fragrant progeny.

=== Flowering ===
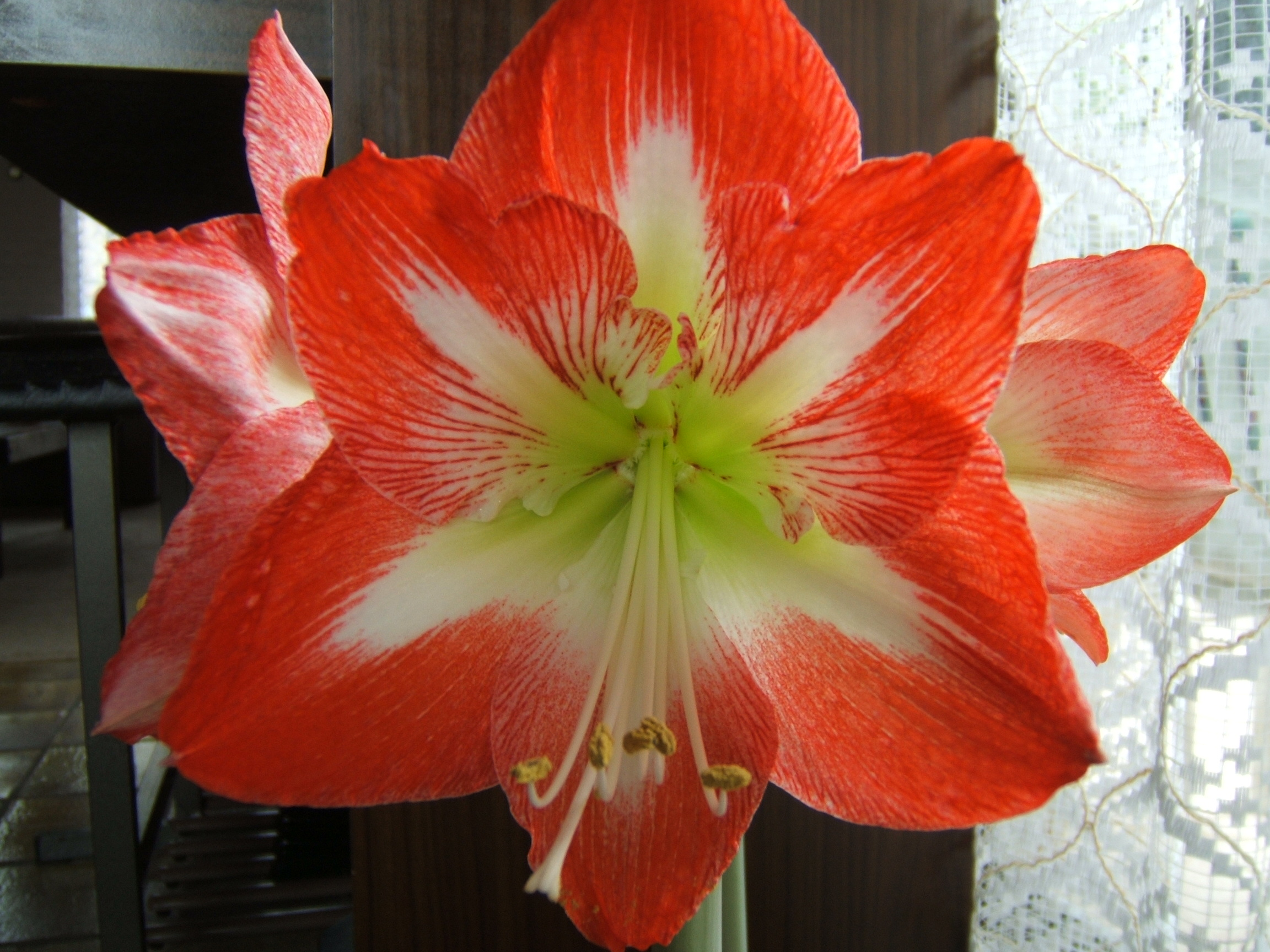
Single Hippeastrum

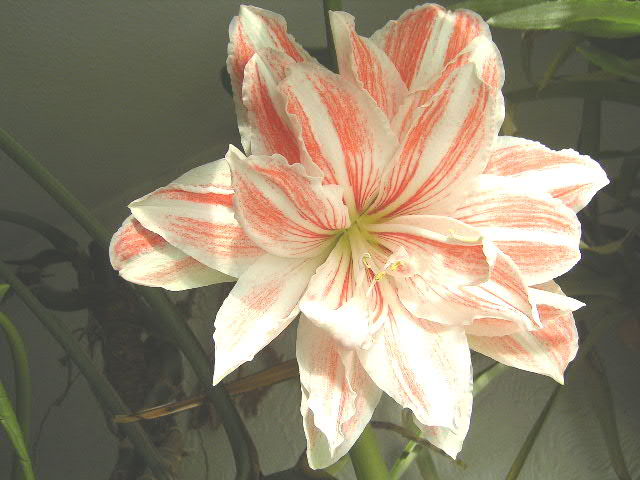
Double Hippeastrum

Hippeastrum hybrids and cultivars are valued for their large ornamental flowers, particularly for indoor cultivation during the Northern Hemisphere winter. The larger the bulb, the more flowers it will produce. The largest bulbs measure 14 to 16 inches (36 to 41 cm) in circumference and will produce three or more scapes (flower stems) with four or more blooms each. The commonest bulbs measure 10 1/2 to 12 1/2 inches (27 to 32 cm) with two scapes with four to six flowers each depending on the cultivar. Some bulbs put up two flower scapes at the same time; others may wait several weeks between blooms and sometimes the second scape will have only two or three flowers rather than the usual four. A bulb needs to produce large, healthy leaves in the summer growing season before it can send up a scape the following year. Bulbs are often described by the country of origin of the bulb producers, since they may have different characteristics, e.g. 'Dutch Amaryllis', 'South African Amarylllis'. Dutch bulbs usually produce flowers first, then, after they have finished blooming (hysteranthous), the plant will begin growing leaves. Bulbs from the South African growers usually put up a scape and leaves at the same time (synanthous).

Of the many hybrids, the best known are those producing flowers with red, pink, salmon, orange and white colors. Other flower colors include yellow and pale green with variations on these including multicoloring, with different colored mottling, stripes or edges on the petals. Some flowers have uniform colors or patterns on all six petals while others have more pronounced colors on the upper petals than on the lower ones.

Although many names are used to describe hybrids and cultivars, e.g., 'Large Flowering', 'Dutch', 'Royal Dutch', there are five types that are commonly sold;

- Single flower (large flowering)
- Double flower
- Miniature (dwarf, or small flowering)
- Trumpet
- Jumbo (mammoth)

'Trumpets', as the name suggests, have flared, tube-shaped flowers. Single, double, and miniature bulbs are the ones typically sold by nurseries and other stores for the holidays in December and for St. Valentine’s Day and Easter.

Of the commercially available Hippeastrum species, sometimes sold as 'exotic' amaryllis, Hippeastrum cybister has extremely thin petals often described as spider-like. The miniature evergreen Hippeastrum papilio or "butterfly amaryllis" whose petals resemble a butterfly (papilio) has a unique color and pattern with broad rose-burgundy center stripes and striations of pale green on the upper petals and narrow stripes on the bottom three. It has been crossed with both cybister and single flower cultivars to produce hybrids with unusual striping.

=== Dormancy ===
Hippeastrum bulbs can be induced to rebloom yearly by mimicking the conditions in its natural environment (cool dry winters). When foliage starts to yellow, dormancy can be induced by withholding water and placing the plant in a cool 4–13 °C (39–55 °F) dark place for six to ten weeks or until buds start to show. Even when plants are thriving outdoors in temperate climates, dormancy can be induced by withholding water and fertilizer in the northern hemisphere autumn, and bringing indoors to a cool environment prior to the first frost. Leaves will usually wither during this period and a flower stem begin to emerge after eight to ten weeks.

Bulbs can then be brought back into light, inspected for pests or rot, and repotted in fresh soil after cutting foliage to about 10 cm above the bulb. Subsequent care is as for new bulbs, as described above. Best results are obtained by transplanting every three to four years.

=== Cultivars ===
The cultivar 'Clown' (Double Galaxy Group) (white with red stripes) has received the Royal Horticultural Society's Award of Garden Merit.

=== Gallery ===
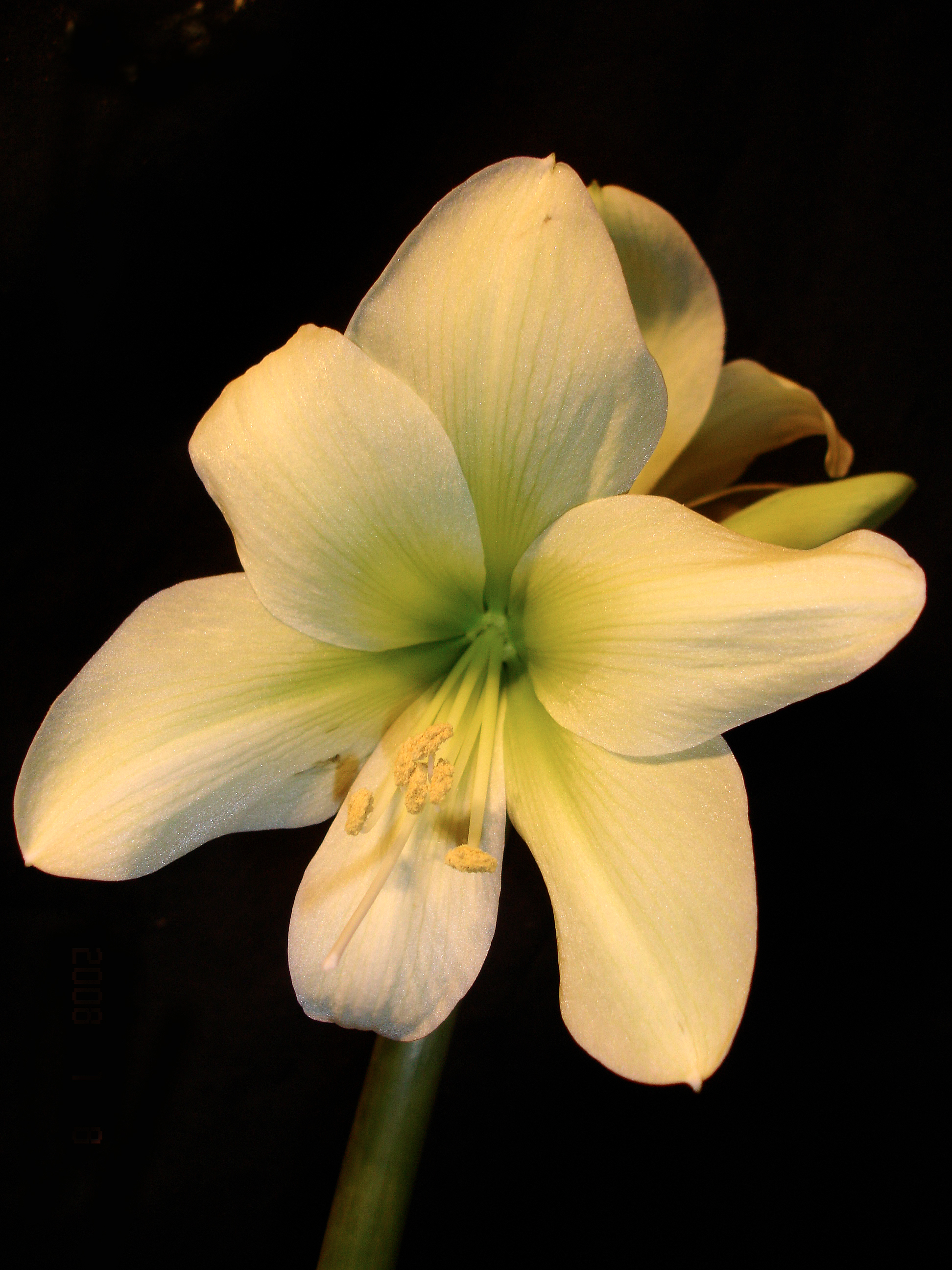
'Lemon Sorbet'

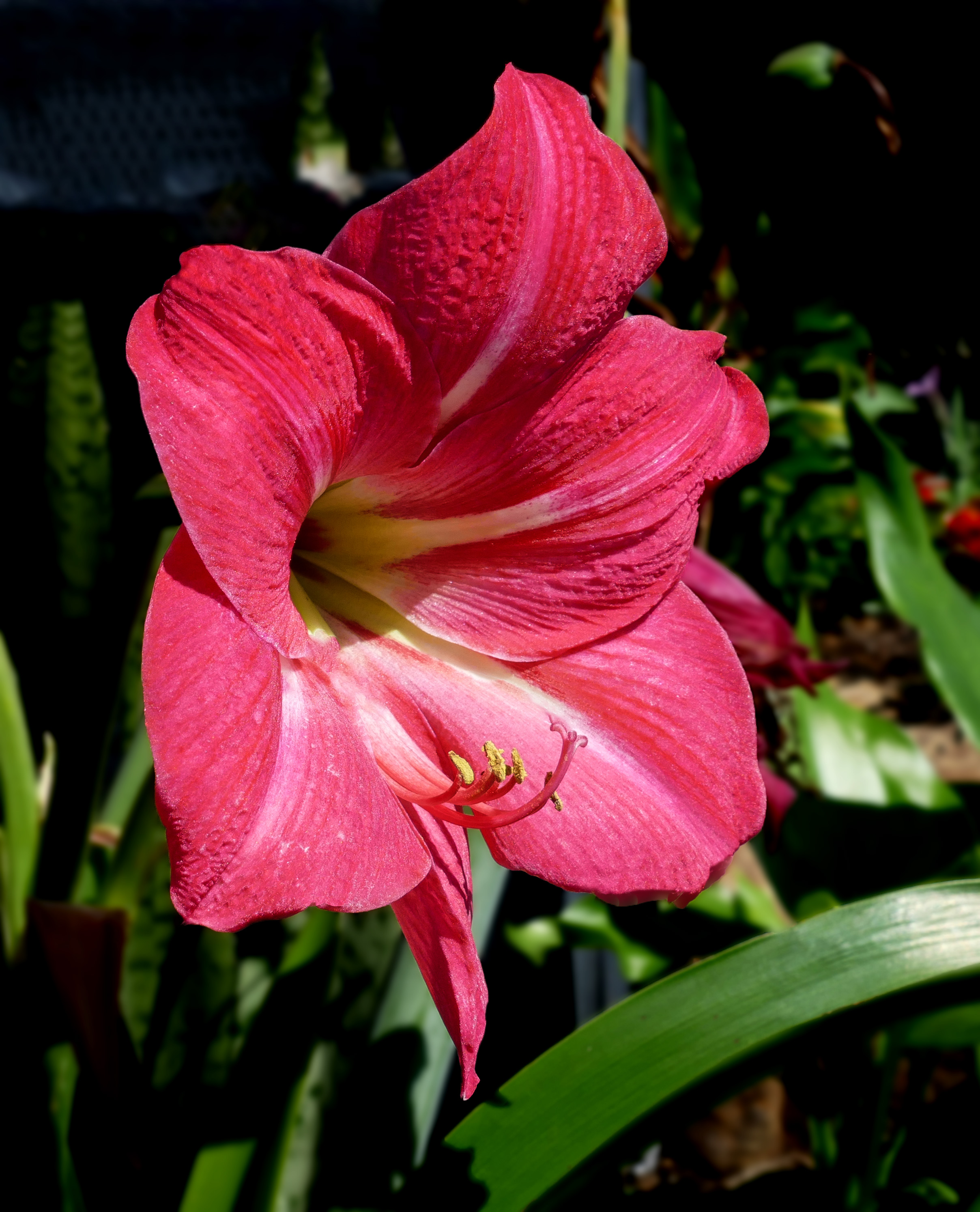
'Pink Diamond'

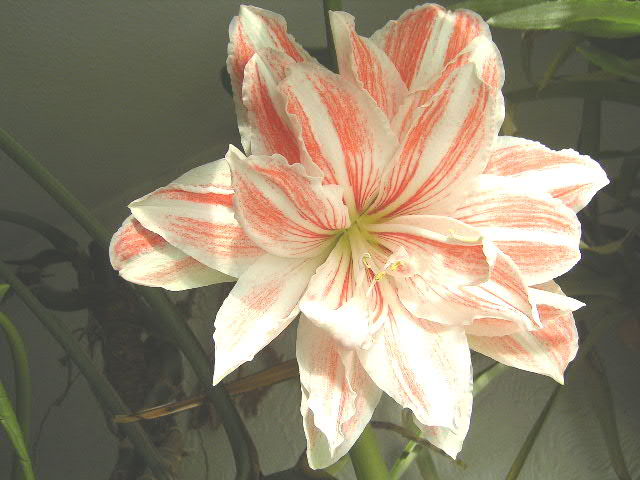
'Candy Cane'

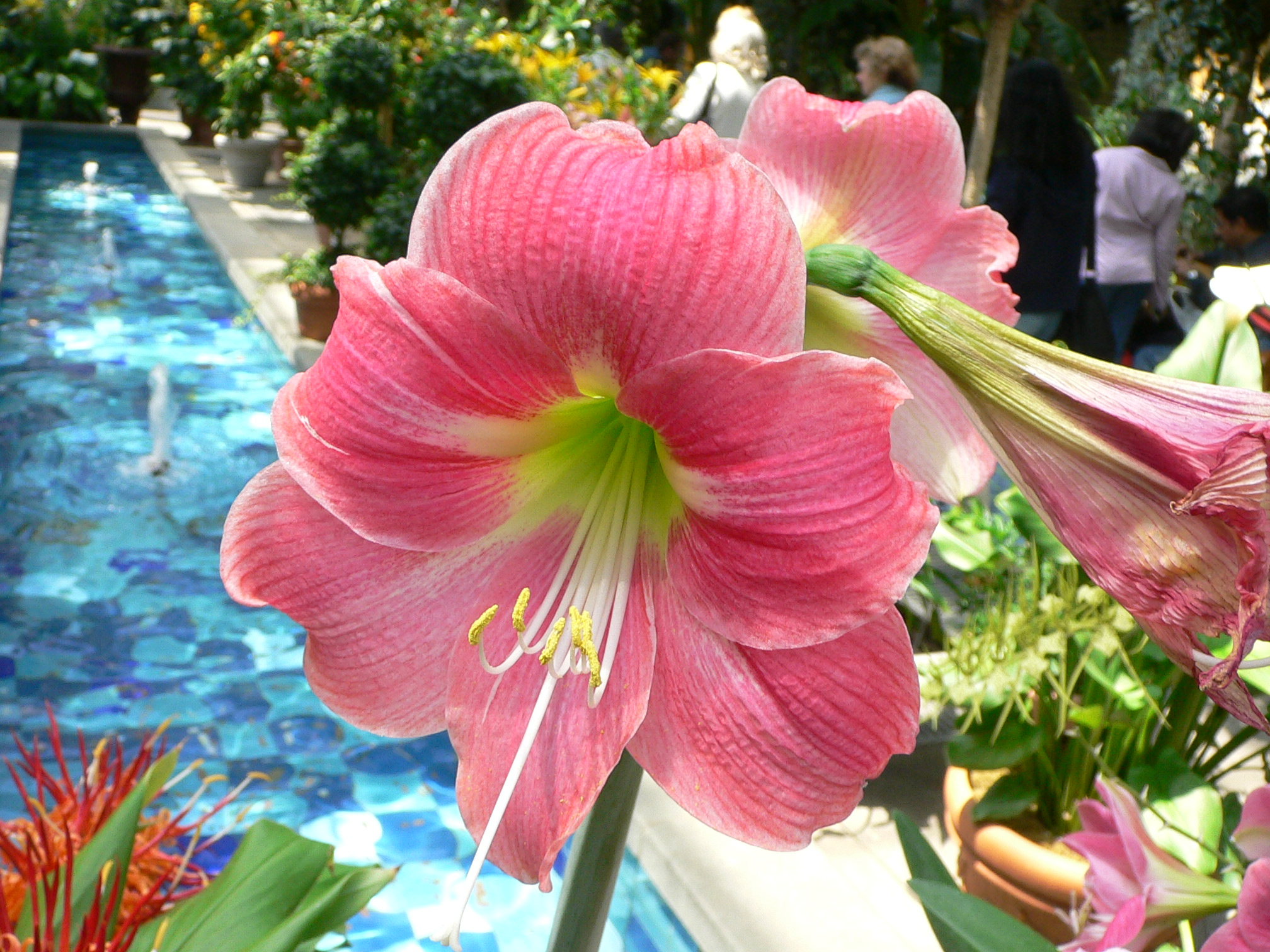
'Candy Floss'

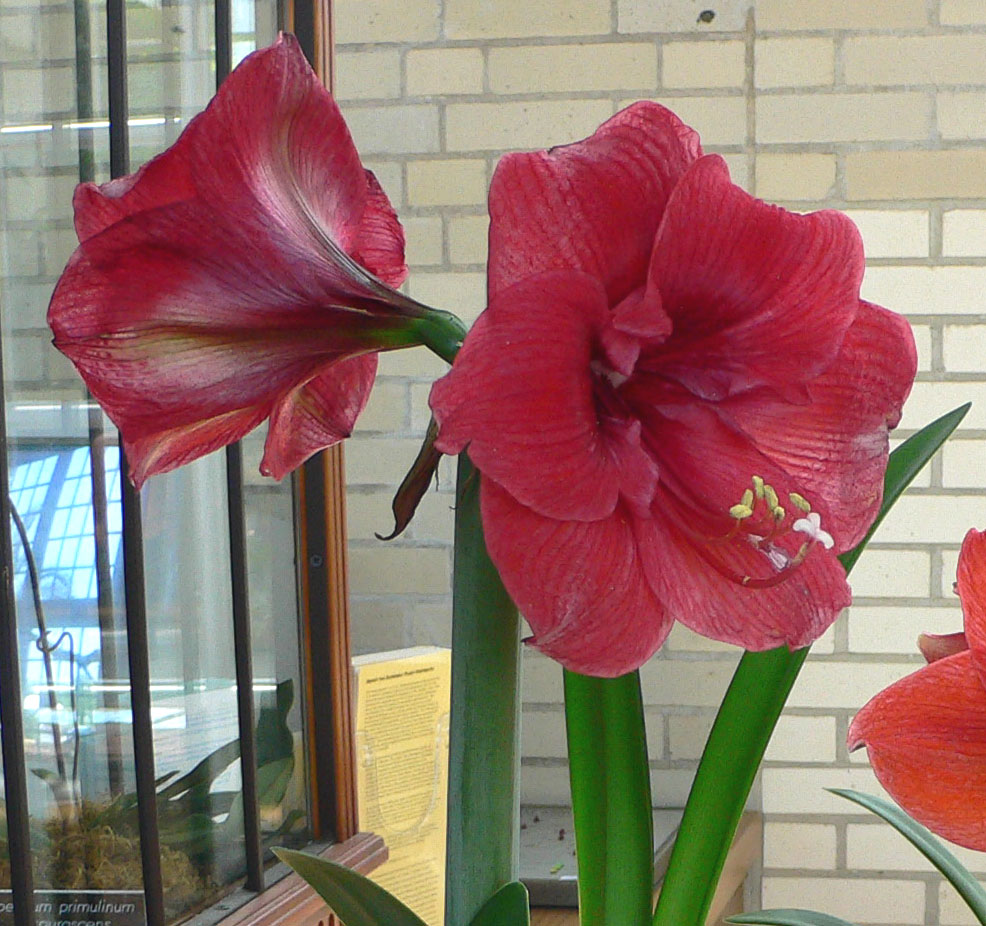
'Merry Christmas'

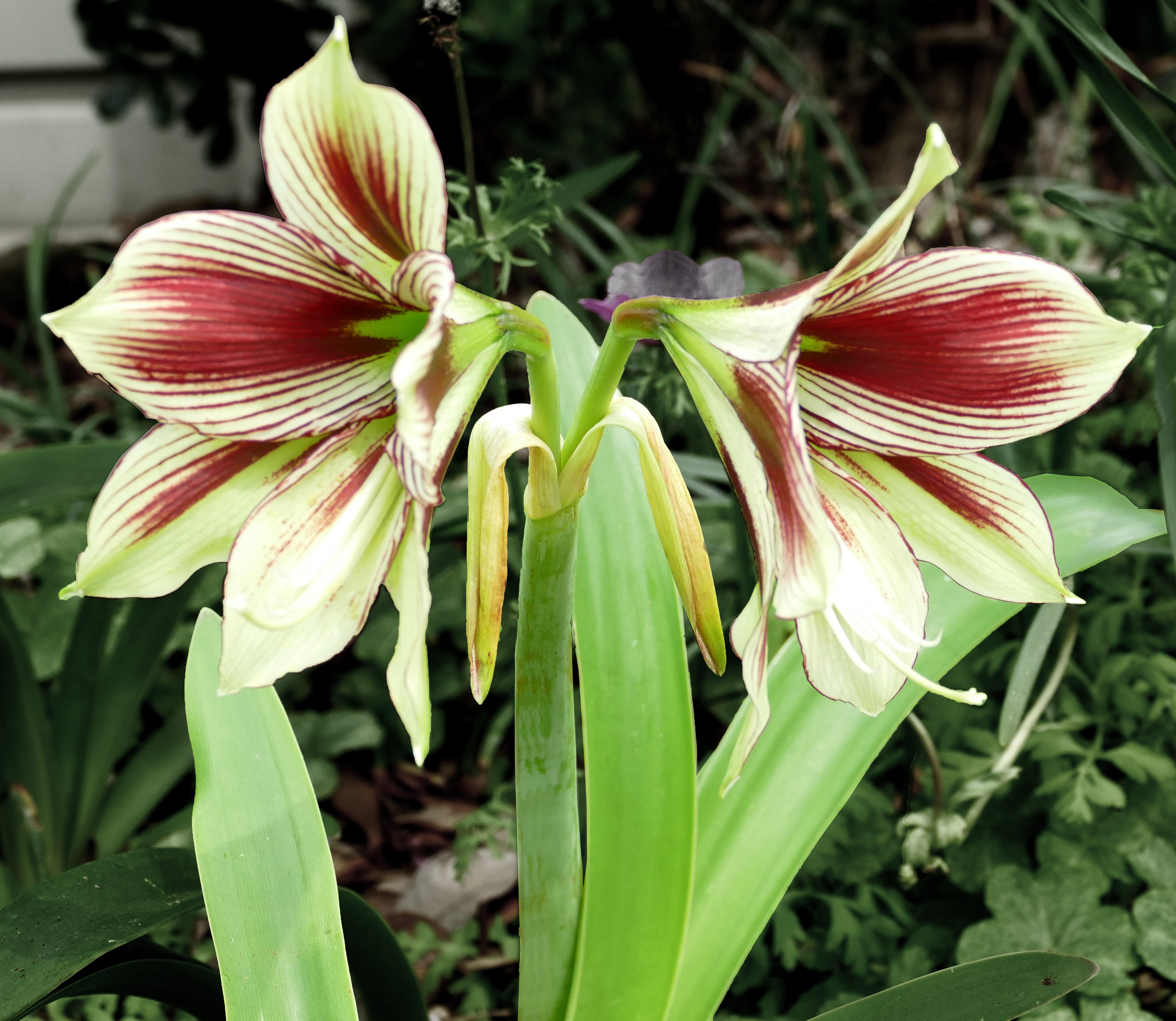
'Papilio'

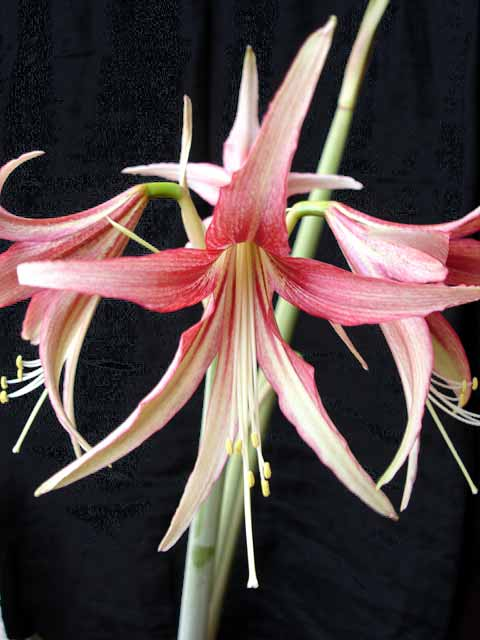
'Lima'

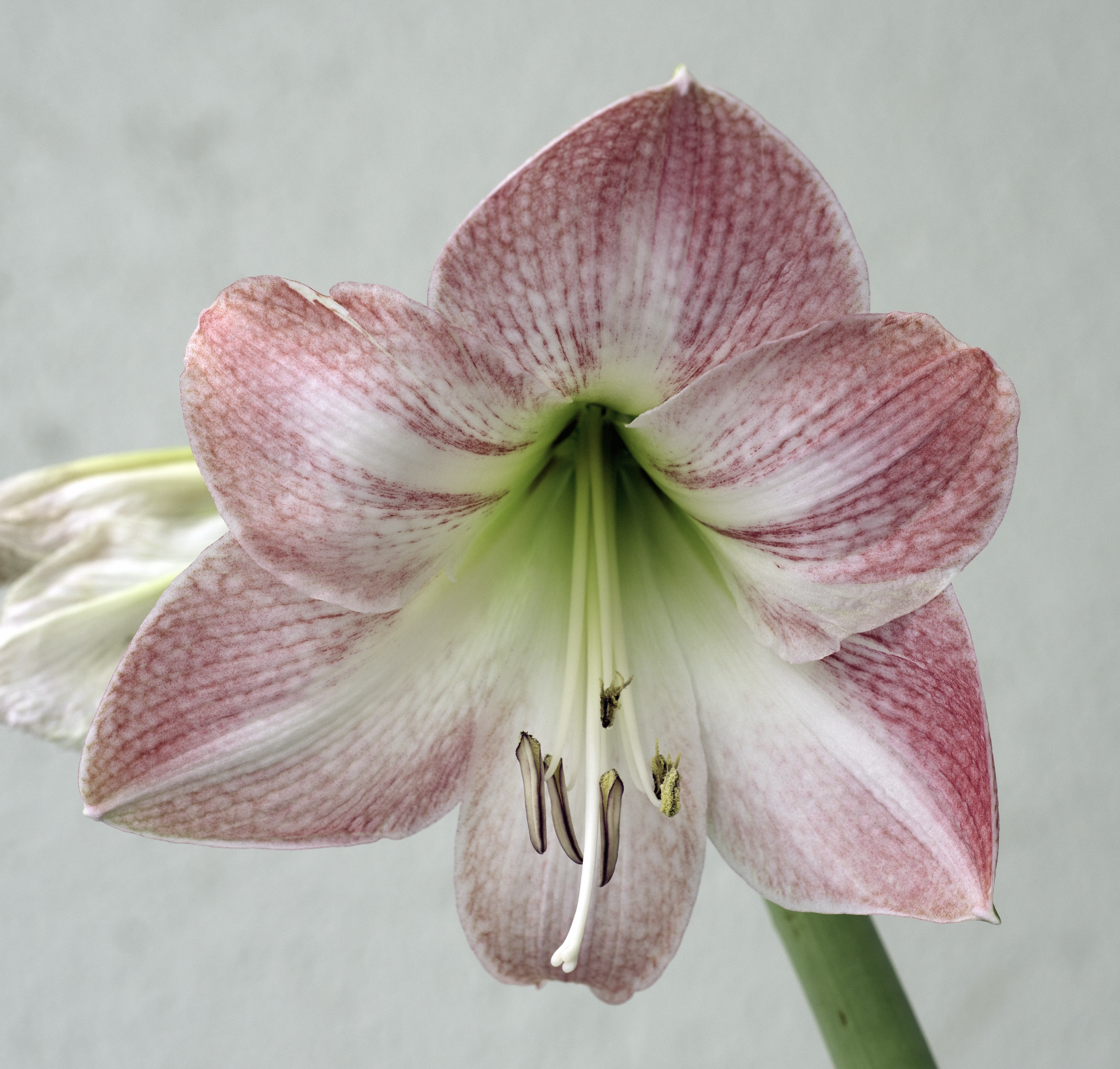
'Apple Blossom'

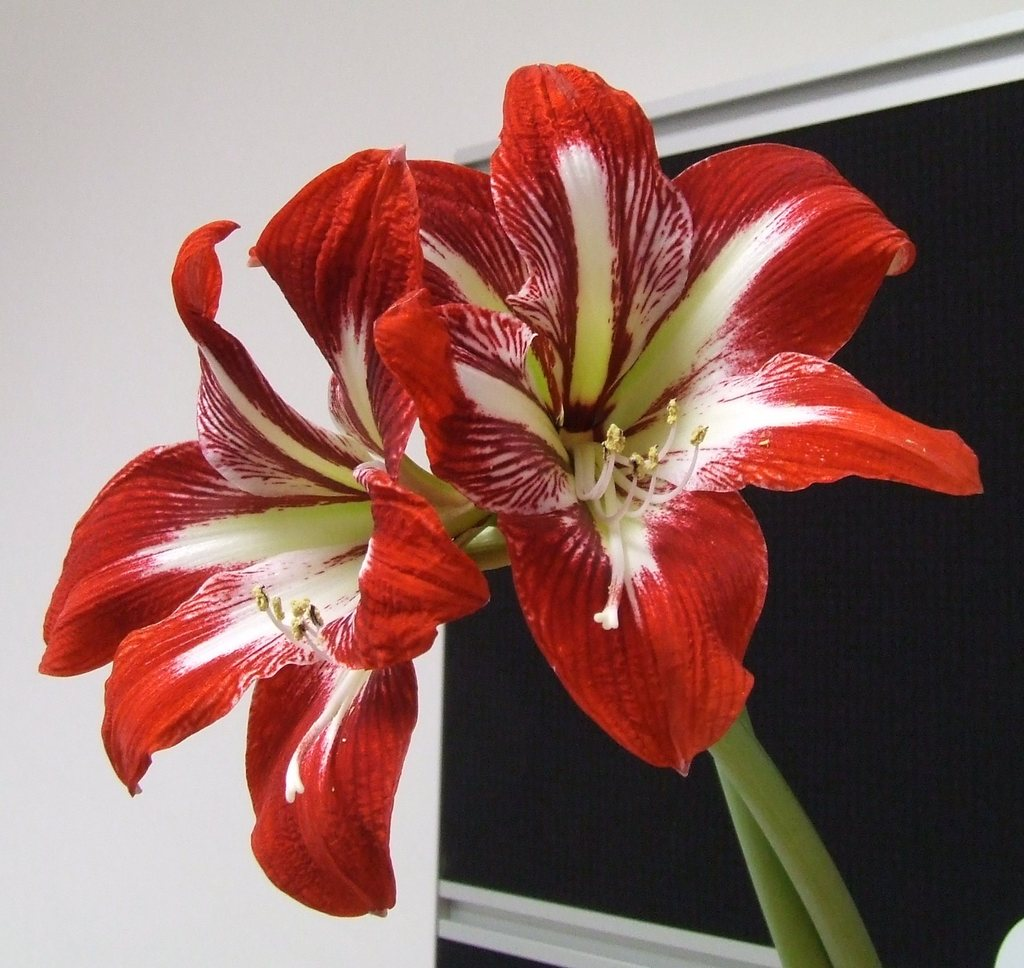
'Gilmar'

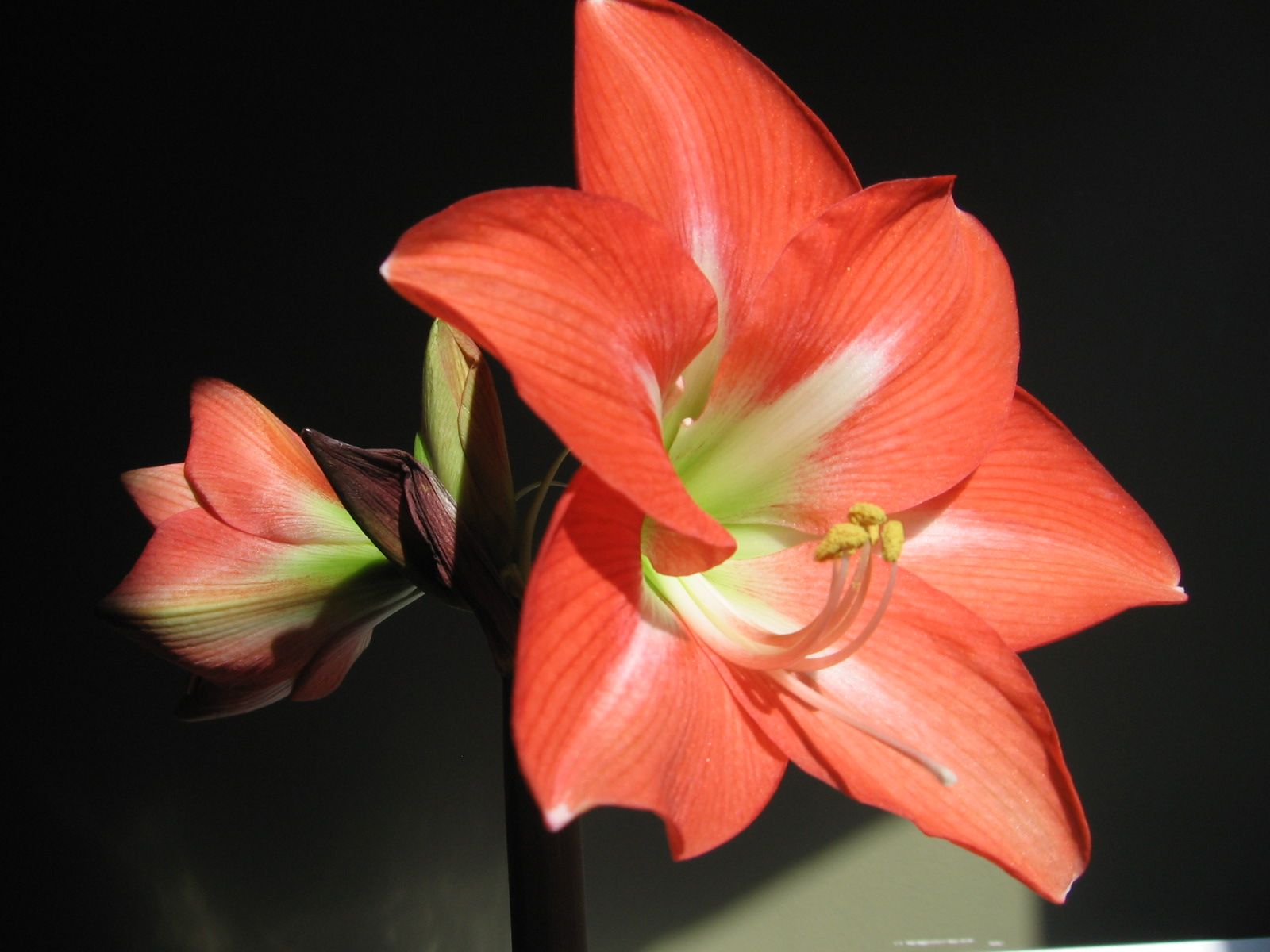
'Charmeur'

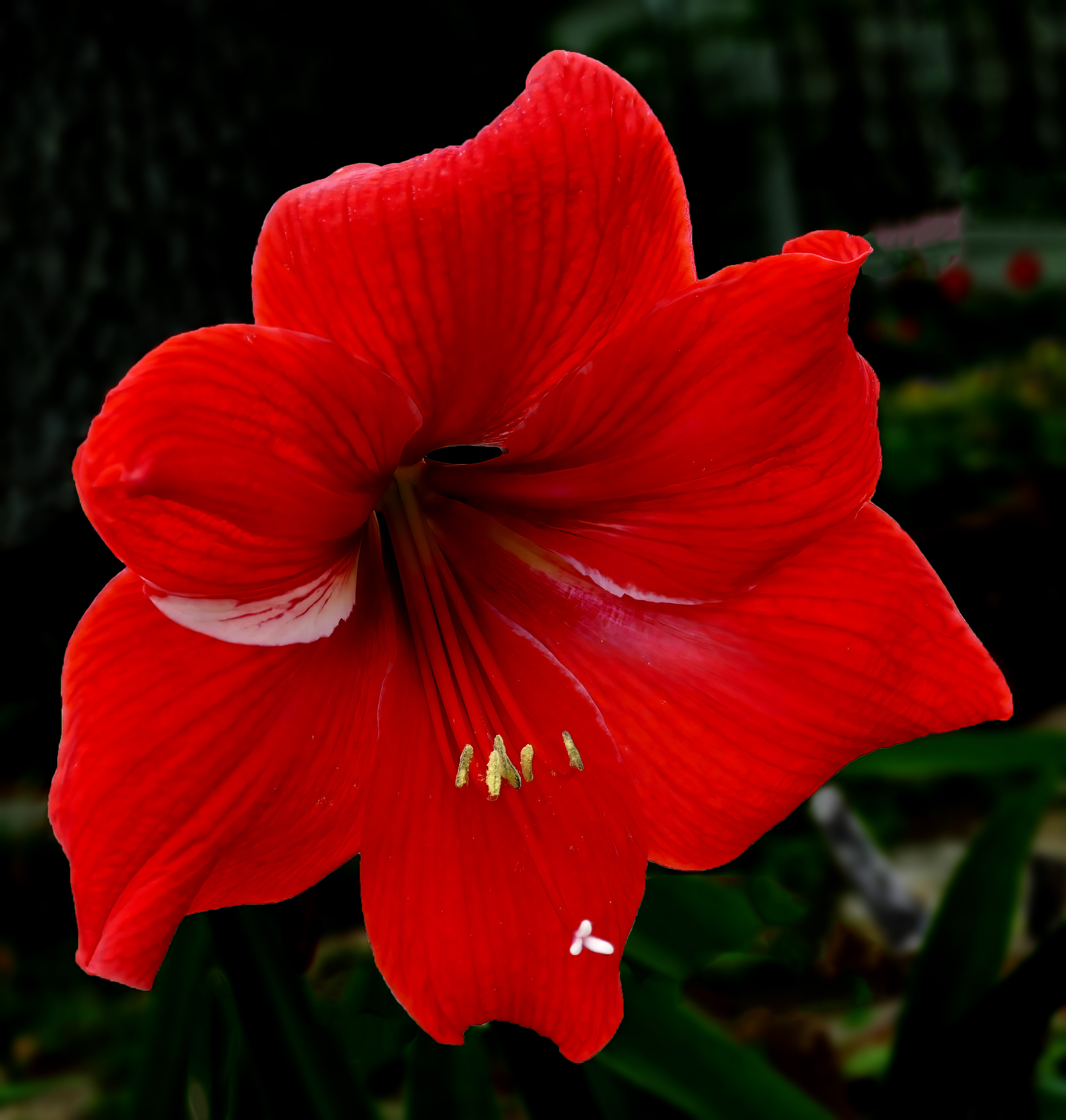
'Kolibri'

== Uses ==
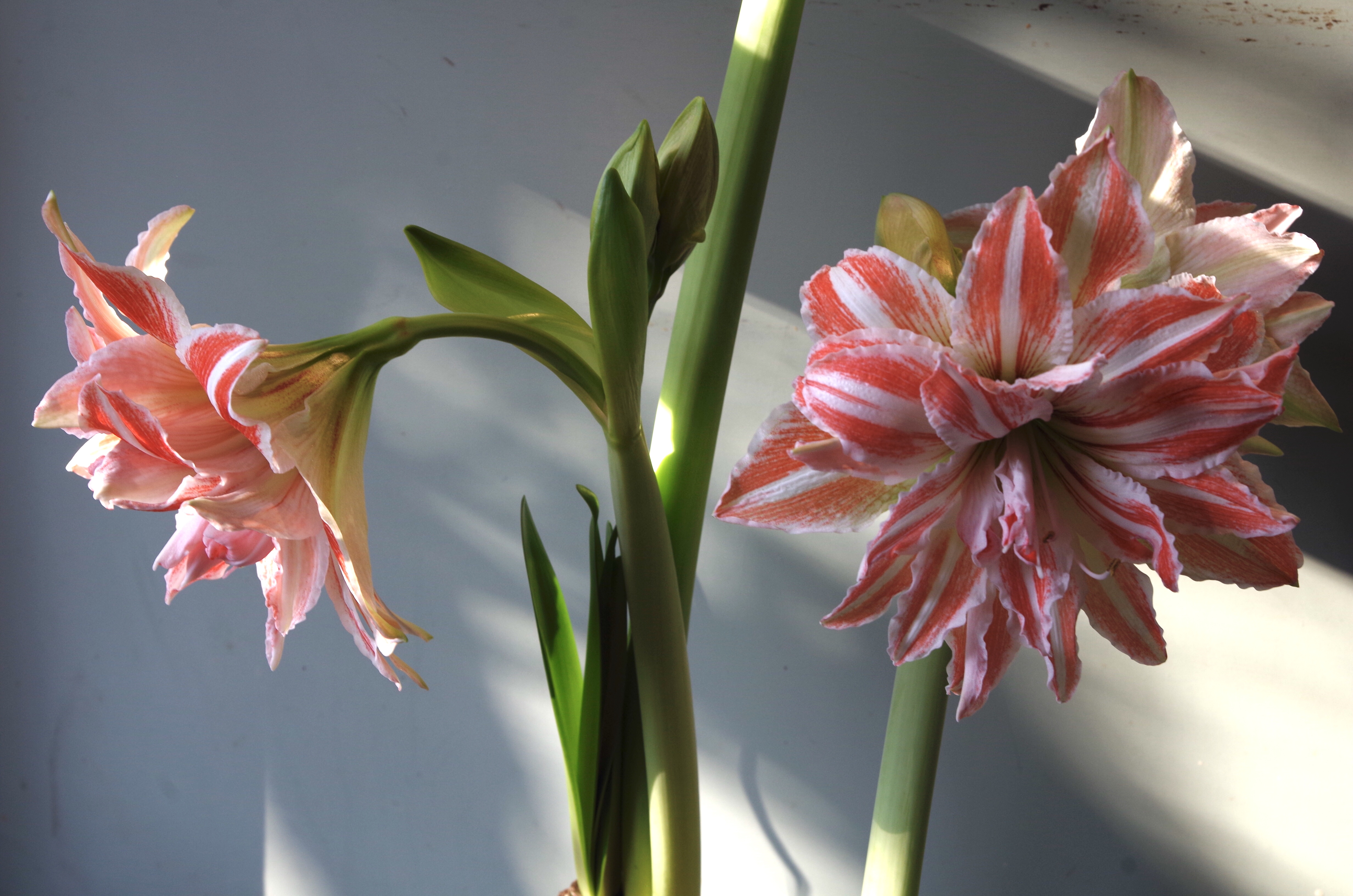
Hippeastrum 'Dancing Queen' flowering indoors in January

Cultivars of Hippeastrum are popular indoor ornamental plants prized for their large brightly colored flowers (including red, pink, salmon, orange and white). As such they have a very important place in the floriculture trade for sale as cut flowers or potted plants. Although the market is dominated by the Netherlands, and South Africa, other areas of production include Israel, Japan and the United States (Florida). Brazil also produces 17 million Hippeastrum bulbs annually.

Hippeastrum has yielded at least 64 isoquinoline alkaloids, which include anti-parasitic (e.g. candimine) and psychopharmacological activity due to their high alkaloid content. One alkaloid isolated from Hippeastrum vittatum (montanine) has demonstrated antidepressant, anticonvulsant and anxiolytic properties. Hippeastrum puniceum may also have therapeutic properties as it has been used in folk medicine to treat swellings and wounds.

== Symbolism ==
A stylized flower of a Hippeastrum cultivar (under its common name of amaryllis) is used internationally as a symbol for organizations associated with Huntington's disease, a genetic degenerative disease of the nervous system. The widely used logo represents a double image of a head and shoulders as the flower of a growing and vibrant plant. The reduced size of the inner head and shoulders image symbolizes the diminution in a person caused by Huntington's disease. The leaves represent the protection, purpose, growth and development of the Huntington's community worldwide in its search for a cure and treatment.

== See also ==
- Glossary of botanical terms
- Glossary of plant morphology

== Bibliography ==
=== Books ===
==== General ====
- Brenzel, Kathleen Norris, ed. (2012). The New Sunset Western Garden Book: The Ultimate Gardening Guide (9th ed.). Time Home Entertainment. ISBN 978-0-376-03921-7.
- Clay, Horace F; Hubbard, James C. (1987). Tropical Exotics: Hippeastrum vittatum. University of Hawaii Press. ISBN 978-0-8248-1127-3.
- Cullen, James; Knees, Sabina G.; Cubey, H. Suzanne, eds. (2011). The European Garden Flora Flowering Plants: A Manual for the Identification of Plants Cultivated in Europe, Both Out-of-Doors and Under Glass. Cambridge University Press. ISBN 978-0521761475.
- Dimitri, M. (1987). Enciclopedia Argentina de Agricultura y Jardinería. Tomo I. Descripción de plantas cultivadas (in Spanish). Buenos Aires: Editorial ACME S.A.C.I.
- Hartmann, H.; Kester, D. (1987). Propagación de plantas, principios y prácticas. México: Compañía Editorial Continental S.A. ISBN 978-968-26-0789-9.
- Hessayon, D.G. (1995). The Bulb Expert. London: Transworld Publishers. ISBN 9780903505420.
- Kamenetsky, Rina; Okubo, Hiroshi, eds. (2012). Ornamental Geophytes: From Basic Science to Sustainable Production. CRC Press. ISBN 978-1-4398-4924-8.
- Kubitzki, K., ed. (1998). The families and genera of vascular plants. Vol.3. Berlin, Germany: Springer-Verlag. ISBN 978-3-540-64060-8.
- Mabberley, David J (2013). Mabberley's Plant-Book (3 ed.). Cambridge University Press. ISBN 978-1107782594.
- Phillips, R.; Rix, M (1989). Bulbs. London: Pan Books Ltd.
- Rossi, Rosella (1990). Guía de Bulbos. Barcelona: Grijalbo.
- Simpson, Michael G. (2011). Plant Systematics. Academic Press. ISBN 978-0-08-051404-8.
- Singh, Gurcharan (2004). Plant Systematics: An Integrated Approach. Science Publishers. ISBN 978-1578083510.
- Taylor, P. (1996). Gardening with Bulbs. London: Pavilion Books Ltd.
- Veitch, James Herbert (2011) [1906]. Hortus Veitchii: A History of the Rise and Progress of the Nurseries of Messrs James Veitch and Sons. Cambridge University Press. ISBN 978-1-108-03736-5.
  - see also Hortus Veitchii, Messrs James Veitch and Sons
- Walter, Kerry S.; Gillett, Harriet J., eds. (1998). 1997 IUCN red list of threatened plants. Gland, Switzerland: International Union for Conservation of Nature and Natural Resources Species Survival Commission. doi:10.5962/bhl.title.44833. ISBN 9782831703282.

==== Historical sources (chronological) ====
- Linnaeus, Carl (1753). Species Plantarum. Stockholm: Laurentii Salvii.
- Aiton, W. (1789). Hortus Kewensis 3 vols. London: George Nicol.
- Curtis, W. (1795). "Amaryllis equestris". Botanical Magazine. Vol. 9. p. 305.
- von Jacquin, Nikolaus Joseph (1797). Hortus Schoenbrunnensis. Plantarum Rariorum Horti Caesarei Schoenbrunnensis Descriptiones et Icones. Vol. I. Vienna: Apud C. F. Wappler. p. 33 t. 63 Amaryllis equestris.
- Sims, John (1803). "Amaryllis reticulata". Curtis's Botanical Magazine. Vol. 18. p. 657.
- Koster, Henry (1816). Travels in Brazil. London: Longman, Hurst, Rees, Orme, and Brown.
- Herbert, W. (1819). "Amaryllis reticulata. β. striatifolia Griffin's netted-veined Amaryllis. Coburgia. Herbert". Curtis's Botanical Magazine. Vol. 47. pp. 2113(1–6).
- Herbert, W. (4 April 1820). "On the culture of the Guernsey Lily, and other bulbs of the genera Nerine, Coburgia and Brunsvigia, heretofore united under Amaryllis". Trans. Hortic. Soc. Lond. 4: 176–184.
- Herbert, William (1837). Amaryllidaceae: Preceded by an Attempt to Arrange the Monocotyledonous Orders, and Followed by a Treatise on Cross-bred Vegetables, and Supplement. London: Ridgway.
- Baker, J.G. (1878). Trimen, Henry (ed.). "An enumeration and classification of the species of Hippeastrum". Journal of Botany, British and Foreign. 16: 79–85.
- Baker, John Gilbert (1888). "Hippeastrum". Handbook of the Amaryllideæ including the Alstrœmerieæ and Agaveæ. Vol. 1888. London: Bell. p. 41.
- Link, Johann Heinrich Friedrich (1829). Handbuch zur Erkennung der nutzbarsten und am häufigsten vorkommenden Gewächse. Berlin: Haude und Spener. Digital edition by the University and State Library Düsseldorf
- Miller, Philip (1834). "Amaryllideae". Miller's dictionary of gardening, botany, and agriculture; revised. Oxford University.
- Rafinesque, C. S. (1838) [1836]. Flora Telluriana. Philadelphia: H. Probasco. (4 vols.)
- Darwin, C. (1859). The Origin of Species (PDF) (1st ed.). London: John Murray.
- Salisbury, Richard Anthony; Gray, J. E. (1866). The Genera of Plants (Unpublished fragment). J. Van Voorst.
- Bentham, G.; J.D. Hooker (1883). "Hippeastrum". Genera plantarum ad exemplaria imprimis in herbariis kewensibus servata definita. Vol III Part II. Vol. 3. London: L Reeve & Co. p. 713.
- Rusby, Henry Hurd (March 1927). "Descriptions of New Genera and Species of Plants Collected on the Mulford Biological Exploration of the Amazon Valley, 1921–1922". Memoirs of the New York Botanical Garden. 7: 205–387.

==== Specific ====
- Jamil, Khalid (2011). Hippeastrum: Technique of Bulb and Flower Production. LAP Lambert Academic Publishing. ISBN 978-3-8454-2259-6.
- Ockenga, Starr (2002). Amaryllis. New York: Clarkson Potter. ISBN 978-0-609-60881-4.
- Read, Veronica A. (2004). Hippeastrum: the gardener's amaryllis. Portland OR: Timber Press. ISBN 978-0-88192-639-2.
- Traub, H.P. (1958). The Amaryllis Manual. New York: Macmillan. Archived from the original on 19 May 2015.
- Worsley, Arthington (2012) [1896]. The Genus Hippeastrum: A Monograph. Nabu Press. ISBN 978-1-277-39963-9.

=== Articles and theses ===
- de Andrade, Jean Paulo; Berkov, Strahil; Viladomat, Francesc; Codina, Carles; Zuanazzi, José Angelo S.; Bastida, Jaume (2011). "Alkaloids from Hippeastrum papilio". Molecules. 16 (12): 7097–7104. doi:10.3390/molecules16087097. PMC 6264239. PMID 21852767.
- de Andrade, Jean Paulo; Belén Pigni, Natalia; Torras-Claveria, Laura; Guo, Ying; Berkov, Strahil; Reyes-Chilpa, Ricardo; El Amrani, Abdelaziz; Zuanazzi, José Angelo S.; Codina, Carles; Viladomat, Francesc; Bastida, Jaume (2012). "Alkaloids from the Hippeastrum genus: chemistry and biological activity". Rev. Latinoamer. Quím. 40 (2): 83–98.
- De Hertogh, A.A.; Gallitano, L.B. (April–June 1998). "Influence of bulb packing systems on forcing of Dutch-grown Hippeastrum (Amaryllis) as flowering potted plants in North America". HortTechnology. 8 (2): 175–179. doi:10.21273/HORTTECH.8.2.175.
- Dutilh, Julie H.A. (2005). "Ornamental Bulbous Plants of Brazil" (PDF). Acta Hort. (683): 3742. Archived from the original (PDF) on 7 February 2016.
- Dyer, R. A. (1954). "The Cape Belladonna Lily". Taxon. 3 (2): 72–74. doi:10.2307/1217368. JSTOR 1217368.
- Ephrath, J.E.; Ben-Asher, J.; Baruchin, F.; Alekperov, C.; Dayan, C.; Silberbush, M. (2001). "Various Cutting Methods For the Propagation of Hippeastrum Bulbs". Biotronics. 30: 75–83.
- Fellers, J.D. (1998). "Progeny of Hippeastrum papilio". Herbertia. 53: 129–144. Archived from the original on 3 December 2013.
- Flavia Schurmann Da Silva, A.; de Andrade, Jean Paulo; Bevilaqua, Lia R.M.; De Souza, Marcia Maria; Izquierdo, Ivan; Teresinha Henriques, Amélia; Silveira Zuanazzi, José Angelo (2006). "Anxiolytic-, antidepressant- and anticonvulsant-like effects of the alkaloid montanine isolated from Hippeastrum vittatum". Pharmacology Biochemistry and Behavior. 85 (1): 148–154. doi:10.1016/j.pbb.2006.07.027. PMID 16950504. S2CID 22973070. Archived from the original on 2 December 2013.
- García, Nicolás; Meerow, Alan W.; Soltis, Douglas E.; Soltis, Pamela S. (1 March 2014). "Testing Deep Reticulate Evolution in Amaryllidaceae Tribe Hippeastreae (Asparagales) with ITS and Chloroplast Sequence Data". Systematic Botany. 39 (1): 75–89. doi:10.1600/036364414X678099. S2CID 86117335.
- Garbari, F.; Greuter, W. (1970). "On the Taxonomy and Typification of Muscari Miller (Liliaceae) and Allied Genera, and on the Typification of Generic Names". Taxon. 19 (3): 329–335. doi:10.2307/1219056. JSTOR 1219056.
- García, Nicolás; Meerow, Alan W.; Arroyo-Leuenberger, Silvia; Oliveira, Renata S.; Dutilh, Julie H.; Soltis, Pamela S.; Judd, Walter S. (June 2019). "Generic classification of Amaryllidaceae tribe Hippeastreae". Taxon. 68 (3): 481–498. doi:10.1002/tax.12062. S2CID 202854432.(With corrections published 2020)
- Herbert, William (1821). "An Appendix: Preliminary Treatise (pp. 1–14) and A Treatise &c. (pp. 15–52)". The Botanical Register. 7. For references to Hippeastrum, see pp. 7ff, 31–34; for detailed descriptions of Hippeastrum splendens, see pp. 52–53.
- Holmes, Walter C. (2008). "Hippeastrum". EFloras. 26. Missouri Botanical Garden, St. Louis, MO & Harvard University Herbaria, Cambridge, MA: 55 – via www.efloras.org.
- Meerow, Alan W.; Van Scheepen, Johan; Dutilh, Julie H.A. (1997). "Transfers from Amaryllis to Hippeastrum (Amaryllidaceae)". Taxon. 46 (1): 15–19. doi:10.2307/1224287. JSTOR 1224287.
- Meerow, Alan W. (1999). "Breeding Amaryllis". Herbertia. 54: 67–83.
- Meerow, Alan W.; Fay, Michael F.; Guy, Charles L.; Li, Qin-Bao; Zaman, Faridah Q.; Chase, Mark W. (1999). "Systematics of Amaryllidaceae based on cladistic analysis of plastid sequence data". American Journal of Botany. 86 (9): 1325–1345. doi:10.2307/2656780. JSTOR 2656780. PMID 10487820.
- Meerow, Alan W.; Guy, Charles L.; Li, Qin-Bao; Yang, Si-Lin (October 2000). "Phylogeny of the American Amaryllidaceae Based on nrDNA ITS Sequences". Systematic Botany. 25 (4): 708–726. doi:10.2307/2666729. JSTOR 2666729. S2CID 20392462. Archived from the original on 4 March 2016.
- Meerow, Alan W. (2009). "Tilting at windmills: 20 years of Hippeastrum breeding". Israel Journal of Plant Sciences. 57 (4): 303–313. Bibcode:2009IsJPS..57..303M. doi:10.1560/IJPS.57.4.303 (inactive 12 July 2025).
- Mitchell, S.A.; Ahmad, M.H. (2006). "A review of medicinal plant research at the University of the West Indies, Jamaica, 1948–2001". West Indian Med. J. 55 (4): 243–69. doi:10.1590/S0043-31442006000400008 (inactive 12 July 2025). PMID 17249314.
- Ochoa, C.M. (2006). "Hippeastrum ugentii (Amaryllidaceae: Hippeastreae), a new species from central Peru" (PDF). Phytologia. 88 (2): 176–178. doi:10.5962/bhl.part.27428. Archived from the original (PDF) on 3 October 2011.
- Oliveira, Renata Souza de; Semir, João; Dutilh, Julie Henriette Antoinette (11 November 2013). "Four new endemic species of Hippeastrum (Amaryllidaceae) from Serra da Canastra, Minas Gerais State, Brazil". Phytotaxa. 145 (1): 38. doi:10.11646/phytotaxa.145.1.4.
- Rǎdescu, Daniela Baltac (2012). Cercetări privind caracterele morfologice ale unor soiuri de Hippeastrum vitatum şi comportarea lor în diferite variante tehnologice [Research on morphological characters of certain varieties of Hippeastrum vitatum and their behavior in different technological options] (PDF) (Ph.D Thesis) (in Romanian). BUCUREŞTI: Facultatea de HORTICULTURĂ, UNIVERSITATEA DE ŞTIINŢE AGRONOMICE ŞI MEDICINĂ VETERINARĂ. Archived from the original (PDF) on 3 December 2013.
- Read, V. (1999). "Developments in Hippeastrum hybridization 1799–1999". Herbertia. 54: 84–109.
- Seabrook, J.; Cumming, B. (1977). "The in vitro propagation of Amaryllis (Hippeastrum spp. hybrids)". In Vitro. 13 (12): 831–836. doi:10.1007/bf02615131. PMID 598852. S2CID 28672953.
- Sealy, J.R. (1939). "Amaryllis and Hippeastrum". Bulletin of Miscellaneous Information (Royal Gardens, Kew). 1939 (2): 49–68. doi:10.2307/4111685. JSTOR 4111685.
- Stancato, G.C.; Mazzafera, P. (1995). "Effects of light on the propagation and growth of bulbs of Hippeastrum hybridum cv. Apple Blossom (Amaryllidaceae)". Sci. Agric. (Piracicaba, Braz.). 52 (2): 331–334. doi:10.1590/S0103-90161995000200021.
- Sultana, J.; Sultana, N.; Siddique, M.N.A.; Islam, A.K.M.A.; Hossain, M.M.; Hossain, T. (2010). "In vitro bulb production in Hippeastrum (Hippeastrum hybridum)" (PDF). Journal of Central European Agriculture. 11 (4): 469–474. doi:10.5513/jcea01/11.4.867.
- Takos, Adam; Rook, Fred (31 May 2013). "Towards a Molecular Understanding of the Biosynthesis of Amaryllidaceae Alkaloids in Support of Their Expanding Medical Use". International Journal of Molecular Sciences. 14 (6): 11713–11741. doi:10.3390/ijms140611713. PMC 3709753. PMID 23727937.
- Tjaden, W. L. (November 1979). "Amaryllis belladonna and the Guernsey lily: an overlooked clue". Journal of the Society for the Bibliography of Natural History. 9 (3): 251–256. doi:10.3366/jsbnh.1979.9.3.251.
- Tombolato, Antonio F.C.; Julie H.A. Dutilh; Wilson Barbosa; Renato F.A. Veiga; Thiago N. Lucon. "Brazilian descriptor for Hippeastrum hybrids". 3rd Global Botanic Gardens Congress.
- Traub, Hamilton P. (February 1959). ""Leopoldia Herb. 1821" Invalidly Published". Taxon. 8 (2): 67–70. doi:10.2307/1216035. JSTOR 1216035.
- Traub, H.P. (1980). "The Subgenera of the Genus Amaryllis". Plant Life. 36: 43–45.
- Uphof, J.C.T. (1938). "The history of nomenclature - Amaryllis belladonna(Linn.) Herb., and Hippeastrum (Herb.)". Herbertia. 5: 100–111. Archived from the original on 3 December 2013.
- Uphof, J.C.T. (1939). "Critical review of Sealy's "Amaryllis and Hippeastrum"". Herbertia. 6: 163–166. Archived from the original on 3 December 2013.
- Vargas, C.J.C. (1984). "The Peruvian Species of the Genus Amaryllis (Amaryllidaceae)". Herbertia. 40: 112–134.
- Vargas, Teresa Edith; Oropeza, Maira; de García, Eva (2006). "Propagación in vitro de Hippeastrum sp" [Micropropagation of Hippeastrum sp.]. Agronomía Trop. (in Spanish). 56 (4): 621–626.
- Veitch, Harry (11 March 1890). "The Hippeastrum (Amaryllis)". Journal of the Royal Horticultural Society. 12: 243–260.
- Vijverberg, A.J., ed. (August 1980). "De teelt van Hippeastrum (Amaryllis)" [The production of Hippeastrum (Amaryllis)]. Proefstation voor Tuinbouw Onder Glas te Naaldwijk (in Dutch). 17.
- Williams, M. (1980). "Self-sterility in Hippeastrum (Amaryllis) species". Amaryllis Bulletin. 1: 20.
- Williams, M.; Dudley, T.R. (1984). "Chromosome Count for Hippeastrum iguazuanum". Taxon. 33 (2): 271–275. doi:10.2307/1221167. JSTOR 1221167.
- Youssef, D.T. (2001). "Alkaloids of the flowers of Hippeastrum vittatum". J. Nat. Prod. 64 (6): 839–841. Bibcode:2001JNAtP..64..839Y. doi:10.1021/np0005816. PMID 11421761.
- Manning, R. (1974). "Sprekelia-Amaryllis cross". Plant Life. 30: 85–86.

=== Gardening journals ===
- Douglas, James (24 March 1906). "The Hippeastrum". The Gardeners' Chronicle. Archived from the original on 4 March 2016.
- Hibberd, Shirley (7 April 1883). Robinson, William (ed.). "Lecture on the Amaryllis". The Garden. Vol. 23, no. 504. pp. 313–314.

=== Websites ===
- Brown, Sydney Park; Black, Robert J. (2014). "Amaryllis (Cir-1243)" (PDF). Institute of Food and Agricultural Sciences. Environmental Horticulture Department, University of Florida Extension.
- Carter, Kathie (2010). "Amaryllis" (PDF). University of California Cooperative Extension.
- Constantin, Cornelia (14 December 2007). "Hippeastrum incantator in fiecare casa (Delightful Hippeastrum in every home)" (in Romanian). Gradini.ro. Archived from the original on 5 March 2016.
- De Hertogh, A. A. (June 1998). "Home Forcing of Potted Amaryllis (Hippeastrum) (8529)". Horticulture Information Leaflet 8529. Department of Horticultural Science, North Carolina State University.
- Johansson, Christer (2014). "Hippeastrum". Wiki.Plantae.se (in Swedish). Archived from the original on 3 March 2016.
- Meerow, Alan (1999a). "Amaryllis and Alstroemeria: Old Crops, New Potential" (PDF). University of Florida. Institute of Food and Agricultural Sciences. Fort Lauderdale Research and Education Center. Archived from the original (PDF) on 2 December 2012.
- Pertuit, A.J. (August 1995). "Understanding and Producing Amaryllis (Hort. L 63)" (PDF). Clemson University. Archived from the original (PDF) on 20 October 2016.
- Reid, Duane (1997). "Amaryllis: Year-round care". Rochester Gardening.
- Vigneron, Pascal. "Amaryllidaceae". Amaryllidaceae.org (in French). Archived from the original on 10 October 2012.
  - "Hippeastrum: Bibliographie". Amaryllidaceae.org (in French). Archived from the original on 1 June 2017.
- Kew: RBG (2012). "Hippeastrum Care". Spring Bulbs. Royal Botanic Gardens, Kew. Archived from the original on 9 May 2012.
- "Welcome to the International Bulb Society Website!". International Bulb Society. Archived from the original on 17 December 2014.
- "Hippeastrum". Gardenology. 3 December 2010.
- "Hippeastrum (Group)". Gardening Help: Plant Finder. Missouri Botanical Garden.
- "Infojardin" (in Spanish). 2015.

==== Databases ====
- Jarvis, Charlie (14 November 2016). "Dataset: Clifford Herbarium". Natural History Museum Data Portal. Natural History Museum. doi:10.5519/0022031.
- "JStor Global Plants". 2016.
- "List of Species of the Brazilian Flora". Rio de Janeiro Botanical Garden. 2010. Archived from the original on 26 March 2014. (Search for Hippeastrum)
- Zuloaga, Fernando O.; Morrone, Osvaldo; Belgrano, Manuel J., eds. (2008). "Hippeastrum" (Monogr. Syst. Bot. Missouri Bot. Gard. 107). Catálogo de las plantas vasculares del Cono Sur: (Argentina, Sur de Brasil, Chile, Paraguay y Uruguay). St. Louis, Mo.: Missouri Botanical Garden. ISBN 978-1-930723-70-2.
- Maia, Leonor Costa (2016). "Lista de Espécies da Flora do Brasil". INCT – Herbário Virtual da Flora e dos Fungos. Recife: Institutos Nacionais de Ciência e Teconologia. Archived from the original on 21 October 2020.
- "Tropicos". Missouri Botanical Garden. 2015.
- WCSP (2015). "World Checklist of Selected Plant Families: Hippeastrum". The Board of Trustees of the Royal Botanic Gardens, Kew.
- Kew: RBG (2013). "Kew Glossary". Royal Botanic Gardens, Kew. Archived from the original on 5 December 2013.
- Stevens, P.F. (2016) [2001]. "Asparagales: Amaryllidoideae". Angiosperm Phylogeny Website version 13. Missouri Botanical Garden.

==== Organisations ====
- "Houston Amaryllis Society". Archived from the original on 20 January 2015.
- "Amaryllis fundraising store". Huntington's Disease Society of America. Archived from the original on 12 November 2014.
- "HDA homepage". Huntington's Disease Society (England & Wales).
- "Huntington Society of Canada".
- "Huntington's Disease Association Northern Ireland".
- "IUCN". International Union for Conservation of Nature. 2016.

== External images ==
- "Hippeastrum". Pacific Bulb Society.
  - "Hippeastrum Species". Pacific Bulb Society.
  - "Hippeastrum Hybrids". Pacific Bulb Society.
- "Photo Library". Emaryllis.com.
- "Amaryllis Photo Gallery". U.S. National Arboretum. Archived from the original on 10 June 2016.
- "Hippeastrum Named Varieties". International Bulb Society. Archived from the original on 2 December 2013.
- "Rare Hippeastrum of South America".
- Jacob, Dan (24 March 2007). "Time Lapse Blooming of an Amaryllis". YouTube (YouTube). Archived from the original on 12 December 2021.
