= List of Hippeastrum species =

List of plant species in the genus Hippeastrum.

== List ==
As of November 2013, the World Checklist of Selected Plant Families accepts 91 species of the genus Hippeastrum: Garcia et al (2019) estimate approximately 100 species in subgenus Hippeastrum, together with 3 in subgenus Tocantinia.

=== Subgenus Hippeastrum ===
- Hippeastrum aglaiae (A.Cast.) Hunz. & A.A.Cocucci
- Hippeastrum amaru (Vargas) Meerow
- Hippeastrum andreanum Baker
- Hippeastrum angustifolium Pax
- Hippeastrum anzaldoi (Cárdenas) Van Scheepen
- Hippeastrum apertispathum (Traub) H.E.Moore
- Hippeastrum arboricola (Ravenna) Meerow
- Hippeastrum argentinum (Pax) Hunz.
- Hippeastrum aulicum (Ker Gawl.) Herb.
- Hippeastrum aviflorum (Ravenna) Dutilh
- Hippeastrum blossfeldiae (Traub & J.L.Doran) Van Scheepen
- Hippeastrum brasilianum (Traub & J.L.Doran) Dutilh
- Hippeastrum breviflorum Herb.
- Hippeastrum bukasovii (Vargas) Gereau & Brako
- Hippeastrum caiaponicum (Ravenna) Dutilh
- Hippeastrum calyptratum (Ker Gawl.) Herb.
- Hippeastrum canterai Arechav.
- Hippeastrum caupolicanense (Cárdenas) Van Scheepen
- Hippeastrum chionedyanthum (Cárdenas) Van Scheepen
- Hippeastrum condemaitae (Vargas & E.Pérez) Meerow
- Hippeastrum correiense (Bury) Worsley
- Hippeastrum crociflorum Rusby
- Hippeastrum curitibanum (Ravenna) Dutilh
- Hippeastrum cuzcoense (Vargas) Gereau & Brako
- Hippeastrum cybister (Herb.) Benth. ex Baker
- Hippeastrum damazianum Beauverd
- Hippeastrum divijulianum (Cárdenas) Meerow
- Hippeastrum doraniae (Traub) Meerow
- Hippeastrum elegans (Spreng.) H.E.Moore
- Hippeastrum escobaruriae (Cárdenas) Van Scheepen
- Hippeastrum espiritense (Traub) H.E.Moore
- Hippeastrum evansiae (Traub & I.S.Nelson) H.E.Moore
- Hippeastrum ferreyrae (Traub) Gereau & Brako
- Hippeastrum forgetii Worsley
- Hippeastrum fragrantissimum (Cárdenas) Meerow
- Hippeastrum fuscum Kraenzl.
- Hippeastrum gertianum (Ravenna) Dutilh
- Hippeastrum glaucescens (Mart. ex Schult. & Schult.f.) Herb.
- Hippeastrum goianum (Ravenna) Meerow
- Hippeastrum guarapuavicum (Ravenna) Van Scheepen
- Hippeastrum harrisonii (Lindl.) Hook.f.
- Hippeastrum hemographes (Ravenna) Dutilh
- Hippeastrum hugoi (Vargas) Gereau & Brako
- Hippeastrum iguazuanum (Ravenna) T.R.Dudley & M.Williams
- Hippeastrum incachacanum (Cárdenas) Van Scheepen
- Hippeastrum intiflorum (Vargas) Gereau & Brako
- Hippeastrum kromeri (Worsley) Meerow
- Hippeastrum lapacense (Cárdenas) Van Scheepen
- Hippeastrum leonardii (Vargas) Gereau & Brako
- Hippeastrum leopoldii T.Moore
- Hippeastrum leucobasis (Ravenna) Dutilh
- Hippeastrum macbridei (Vargas) Gereau & Brako
- Hippeastrum machupijchense (Vargas) D.R.Hunt
- Hippeastrum mandonii Baker
- Hippeastrum maracasum (Traub) H.E.Moore
- Hippeastrum marumbiense (Ravenna) Van Scheepen
- Hippeastrum miniatum (Ruiz & Pav.) Herb.
- Hippeastrum mollevillquense (Cárdenas) Van Scheepen
- Hippeastrum monanthum (Ravenna) Meerow
- Hippeastrum morelianum Lem.
- Hippeastrum nelsonii (Cárdenas) Van Scheepen
- Hippeastrum oconequense (Traub) H.E.Moore
- Hippeastrum papilio (Ravenna) Van Scheepen
- Hippeastrum paquichanum (Cárdenas) Dutilh
- Hippeastrum paradisiacum (Ravenna) Meerow
- Hippeastrum paranaense (Traub) Meerow
- Hippeastrum pardinum (Hook.f.) Dombrain
- Hippeastrum parodii Hunz. & A.A.Cocucci
- Hippeastrum petiolatum Pax
- Hippeastrum pilcomaicum (Ravenna) Meerow
- Hippeastrum psittacinum (Ker Gawl.) Herb.
- Hippeastrum puniceum (Lam.) Voss. Syn. H. equestre (Aiton)
- Hippeastrum reginae (L.) Herb.
- Hippeastrum reticulatum (L'Hér.) Herb. Syn H. striatifolium (Sims)
- Hippeastrum rubropictum (Ravenna) Meerow
- Hippeastrum santacatarina (Traub) Dutilh
- Hippeastrum scopulorum Baker
- Hippeastrum starkiorum (I.S.Nelson & Traub) Van Scheepen
- Hippeastrum striatum (Lam.) H.E.Moore
- Hippeastrum stylosum Herb.
- Hippeastrum teyucuarense (Ravenna) Van Scheepen
- Hippeastrum traubii (Moldenke) H.E.Moore
- Hippeastrum umabisanum (Cárdenas) Meerow
- Hippeastrum vanleestenii (Traub) H.E.Moore
- Hippeastrum variegatum (Vargas) Gereau & Brako
- Hippeastrum viridiflorum Rusby
- Hippeastrum vittatum (L'Hér.) Herb.
- Hippeastrum wilsoniae L.J.Doran & F.W.Mey.
- Hippeastrum yungacense (Cárdenas & I.S.Nelson) Meerow

=== Subgenus Toccatinia ===
- Hippeastrum mirum (Ravenna) Christenh. & Byng (type)
- Hippeastrum stigmatovittatum (Büneker & al.) Christenh. & Byng
- Hippeastrum dutilhianum (Büneker & al.) Christenh. & Byng

Unplaced names include Hippeastrum ugentii, considered in the Kew World Checklist of Selected Plant Families as probably a Crinum.
