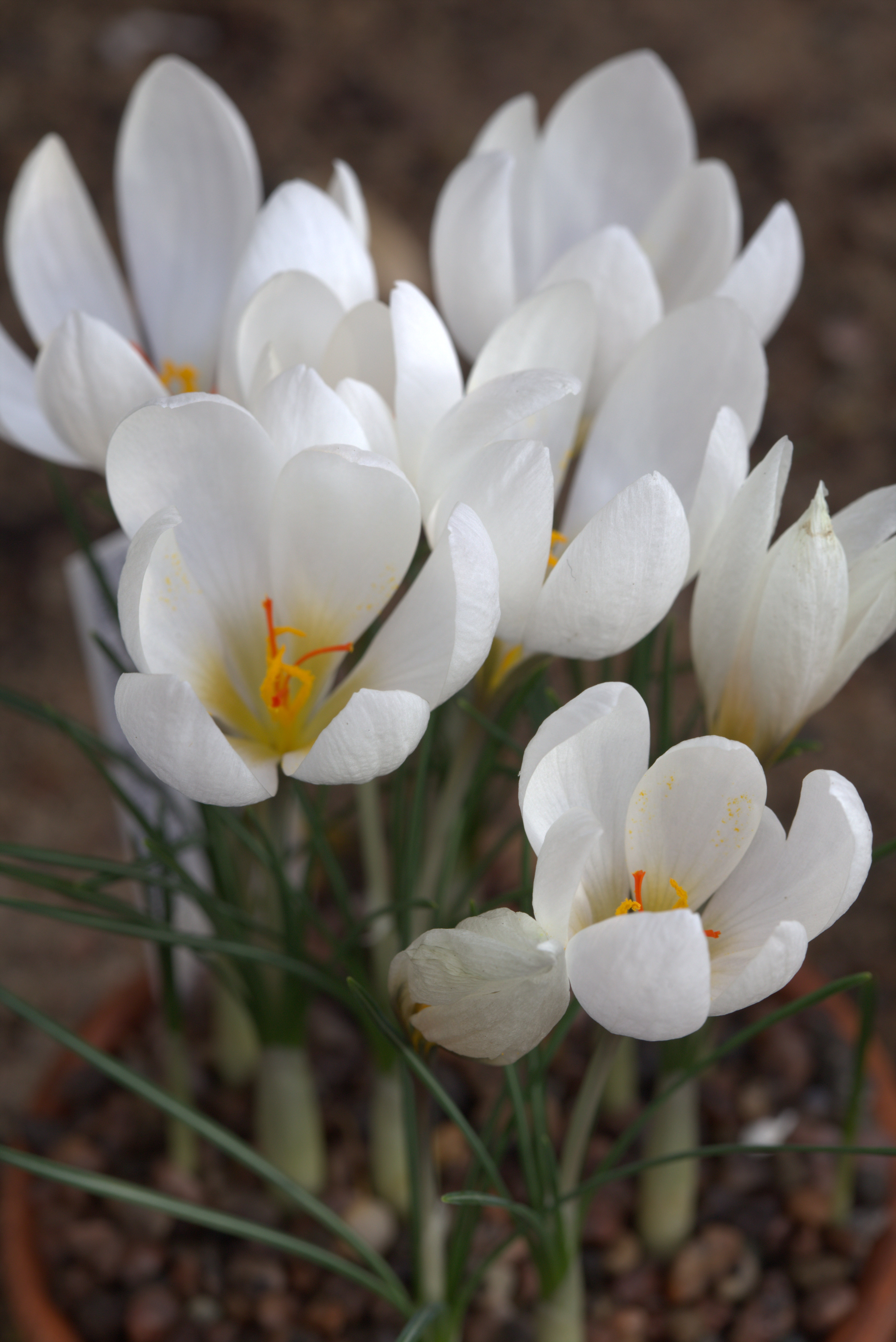

Conservation status
- Least Concern (IUCN 3.1)

Scientific classification
- Kingdom: Plantae
- Clade: Tracheophytes
- Clade: Angiosperms
- Clade: Monocots
- Order: Asparagales
- Family: Iridaceae
- Genus: Crocus
- Species: C. hadriaticus

Binomial name
- Crocus hadriaticus Herb.

= Crocus hadriaticus =

Species of flowering plant

Crocus hadriaticus is a species of flowering plant in the family Iridaceae.

It is a cormous perennial with three subspecies native to Greece.
