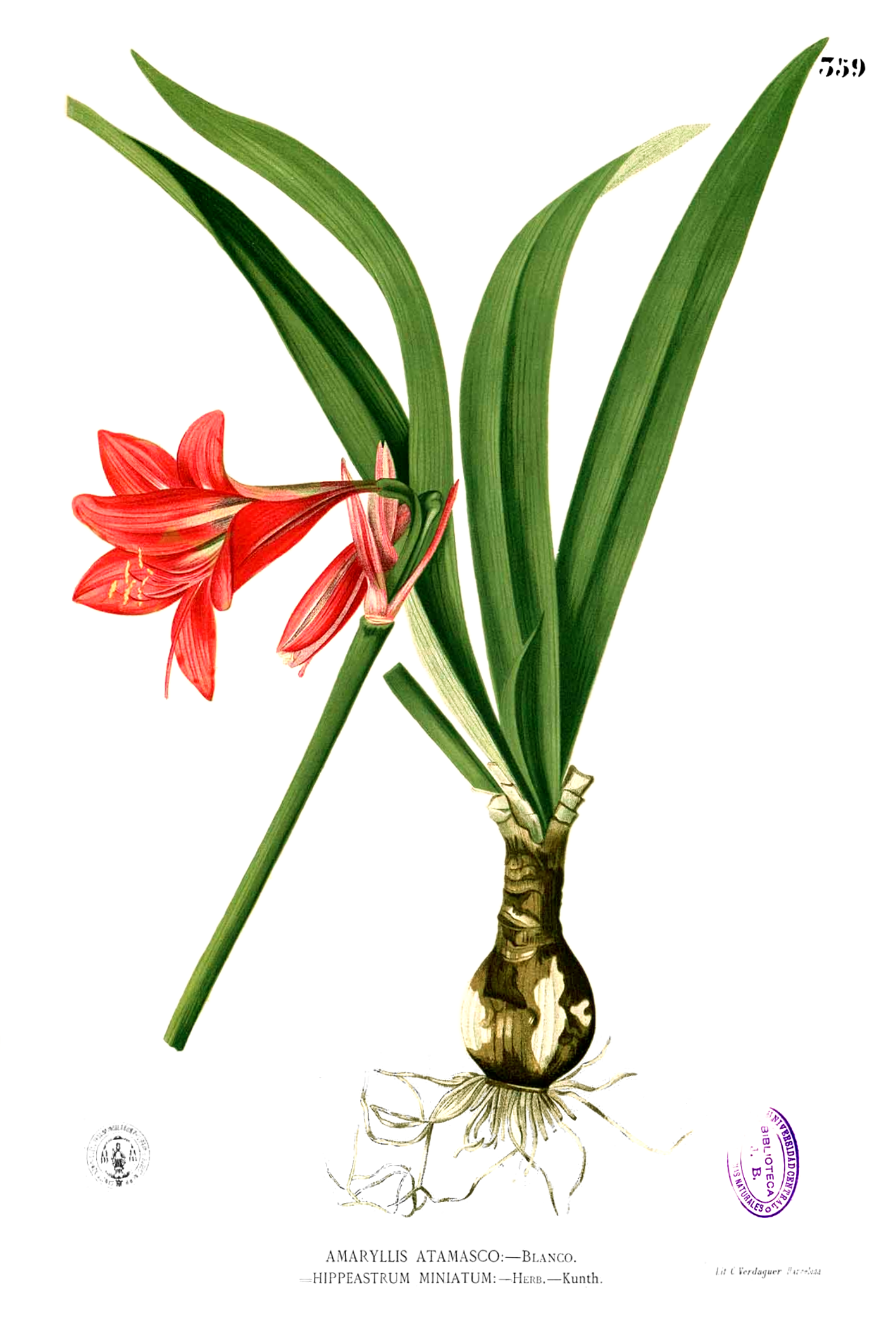

Scientific classification
- Kingdom: Plantae
- Clade: Tracheophytes
- Clade: Angiosperms
- Clade: Monocots
- Order: Asparagales
- Family: Amaryllidaceae
- Subfamily: Amaryllidoideae
- Genus: Hippeastrum
- Species: H. miniatum

Binomial name
- Hippeastrum miniatum (Ruiz & Pav.) Herb.

Synonyms
- Amaryllis miniata Ruiz & Pav. Amaryllis chilensis Ruiz & Pav. Amaryllis atamasco Blanco

= Hippeastrum miniatum =

Species of flowering plant

Hippeastrum miniatum is a flowering perennial herbaceous bulbous plant, in the family Amaryllidaceae, native to Peru.

== Description ==
Flowers are bright orange-red (vermilion) with up to six flowers per stem. Bulbs ovate, 5–8 cm in length, leaves tongue shaped, 45–63 cm in length, up to 2.5 cm wide, stems 30–45 cm high. Perigonium up to 10 cm in length, 33 cm wide, with stamens of a similar length.

== Taxonomy ==
First described by Hipólito Ruiz López and José Antonio Pavón Jiménez in 1802, and formerly named by William Herbert in 1821.

=== Etymology ===
miniatum: Latin - the colour vermilion.

== Distribution ==
H. miniatum grows in river gorges in the high Peruvian Andes.

== Sources ==
- The Plant List (2012). "Hippeastrum miniatum".
- GBIF: Hippeastrum miniatum
- "Hippeastrum miniatum". Tropicos. Missouri Botanical Garden.
- Brako, L. & J. L. Zarucchi. 1993. Catalogue of the flowering plants and gymnosperms of Peru. Monogr. Syst. Bot. Missouri Bot. Gard. 45.
- Macbride, J. F. et al., eds. 1936–1971. Flora of Peru.; new ser. 1980-
- William Herbert. Amaryllidaceae: Preceded by an Attempt to Arrange the Monocotyledonous Orders, and Followed by a Treatise on Cross-bred Vegetables, and Supplement. Ridgway, London 1837: Hippeastrum miniatum, page 409
- JSTOR Global Plants: Hippeastrum miniatum
