= Hippeastrum iguazuanum =

Scientific classification
- Kingdom: Plantae
- Clade: Tracheophytes
- Clade: Angiosperms
- Clade: Monocots
- Order: Asparagales
- Family: Amaryllidaceae
- Subfamily: Amaryllidoideae
- Genus: Hippeastrum
- Species: H. iguazuanum

Binomial name
- Hippeastrum iguazuanum (Ravenna) T.R.Dudley & M.Williams

Synonyms
- Amaryllis iguazuana Ravenna

Species of flowering plant

Hippeastrum iguazuanum is a flowering perennial herbaceous bulbous plant in the family Amaryllidaceae. It is found from southern Brazil (Parana) to Argentina (Misiones), although it has been reported in other Brazilian states.

== Description ==
Hippeastrum iguazuanum is a rare member of the genus Hippeastrum, considered to be part of the subgenus Omphalissa (Salisb.) Baker . It is deciduous, flowering in the early Spring (September–October). Flowers are yellow to green, with red veins and banded undulating tepals. Leaves are glaucous, and in some specimens the young leaves are dark purple.

== Taxonomy ==
First described by Pierfelice Ravenna in 1971, and formally named by Dudley and Williams in 1984.

=== Etymology ===
The name derives from its original collection and identification by Ravenna in the Iguazú National Park in Argentina.

== Ecology ==
Hippeastrum iguazuanum prefers cliff faces with dense vegetation.

== Cultivation ==
Hippeastrum iguazuanum is easily grown as a potted plant, or in gardens in Hardiness Zones of 10 or above (Mediterranean climate). It can be propagated from offset bulbils on the mother bulb.

== Sources ==
- The Plant List (2012). "Hippeastrum iguazuanum".
- GBIF: Hippeastrum iguazuanum
- Pacific Bulb Society: Hippeastrum iguazuanum (images)
