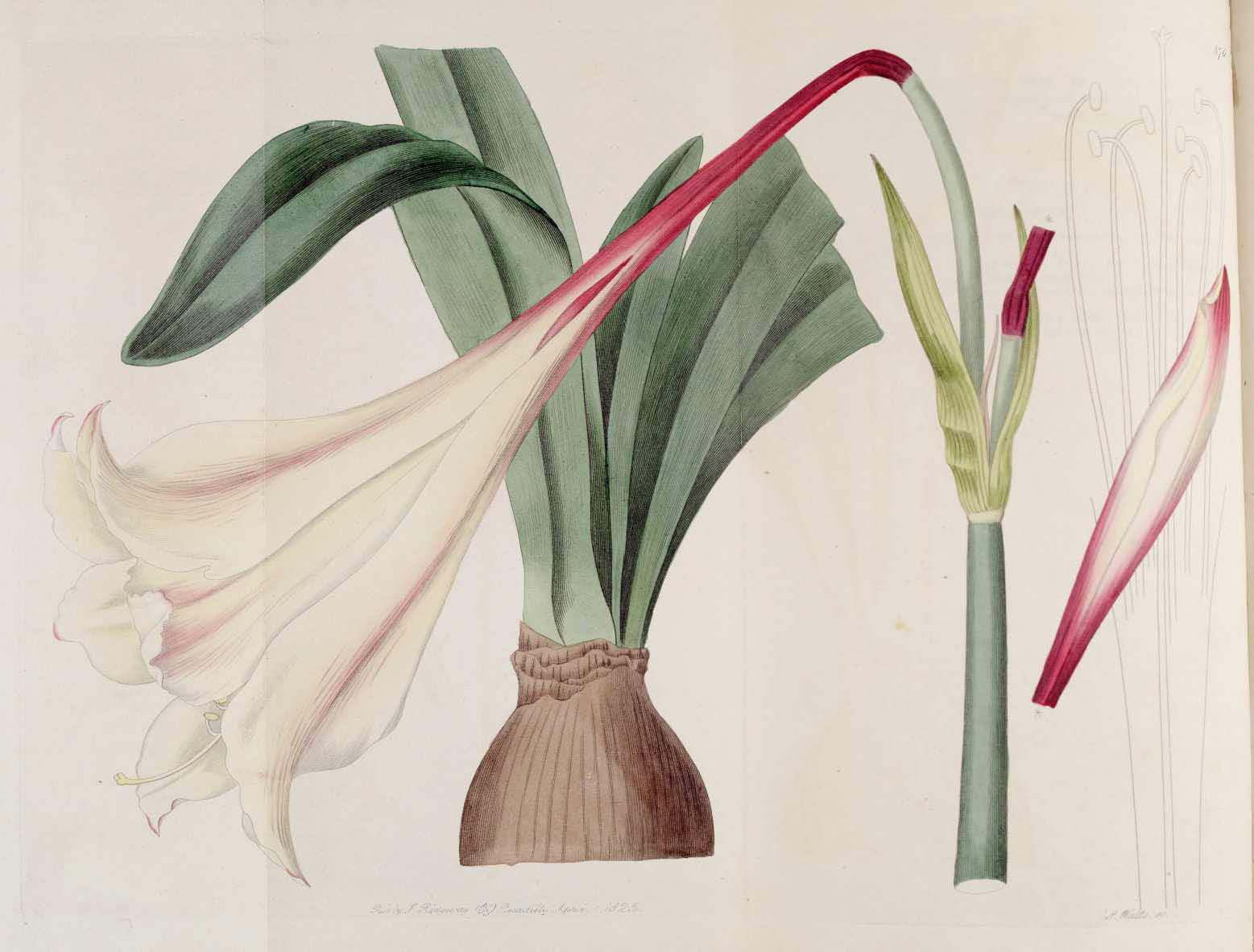
- Illustration in Botanical Register; Consisting of Coloured Figures of Exotic Plants Cultivated in British Gardens; with their History and Mode of Treatment. London 11: t. 876. 1825, as Amaryllis solandriflora var. vittata

Scientific classification
- Kingdom: Plantae
- Clade: Tracheophytes
- Clade: Angiosperms
- Clade: Monocots
- Order: Asparagales
- Family: Amaryllidaceae
- Subfamily: Amaryllidoideae
- Genus: Hippeastrum
- Species: H. elegans

Binomial name
- Hippeastrum elegans (Spreng.) H.E.Moore

Synonyms
- Many, including: Amaryllis elegans Spreng., 1815; Amaryllis elegans var. albostriata; Amaryllis elegans var. ambigua; Amaryllis elegans var. ambigua (Hook.) Traub & Moldenke, 1949; Amaryllis elegans var. divifrancisci Cárdenas, 1960; Amaryllis elegans var. rubrituba (Herb.) Traub, 1958; Amaryllis elegans var. striata (Herb.) Traub, 1958; Amaryllis elegans var. vittata (Lindl.) Traub, 1958; Amaryllis solandriflora var. vittata

= Hippeastrum elegans =

Species of flowering plant

Hippeastrum elegans is a species of flowering plant. It is native to Central and South America, from Costa Rica to Brazil. It grows to 40 cm in height and has flowers of 20 cm.

== See also ==
- List of Hippeastrum species
