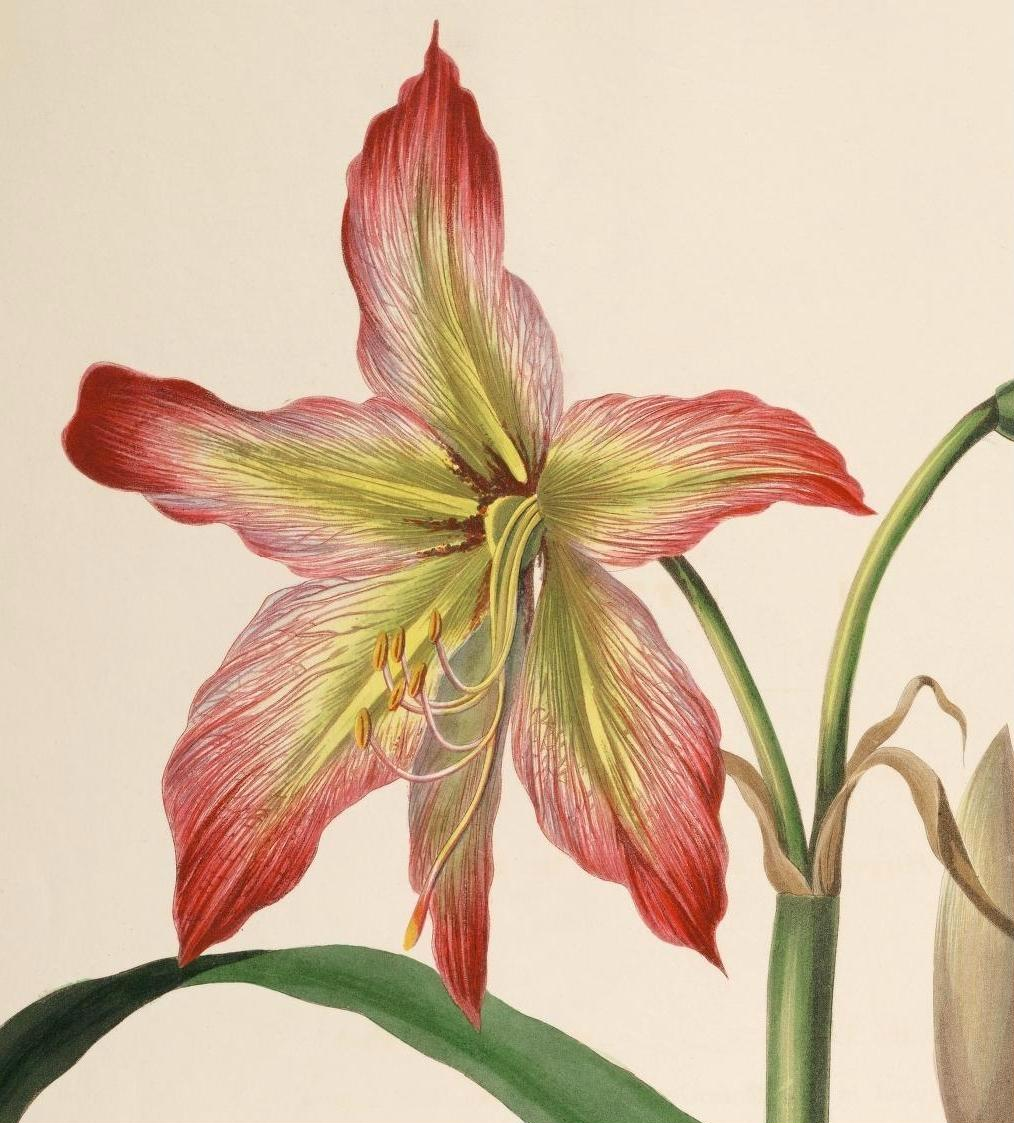
- Hippeastrum psittacinum by Priscilla Susan Falkner

Scientific classification
- Kingdom: Plantae
- Clade: Tracheophytes
- Clade: Angiosperms
- Clade: Monocots
- Order: Asparagales
- Family: Amaryllidaceae
- Subfamily: Amaryllidoideae
- Genus: Hippeastrum
- Species: H. psittacinum

Binomial name
- Hippeastrum psittacinum (Ker Gawl.) Herb.

Synonyms
- Amaryllis psittacina Ker Gawl. Basionym; Trisacarpis psittacina (Ker Gawl.) Raf. Aschamia psittacina (Ker Gawl.) Salisb.

= Hippeastrum psittacinum =

Species of flowering plant

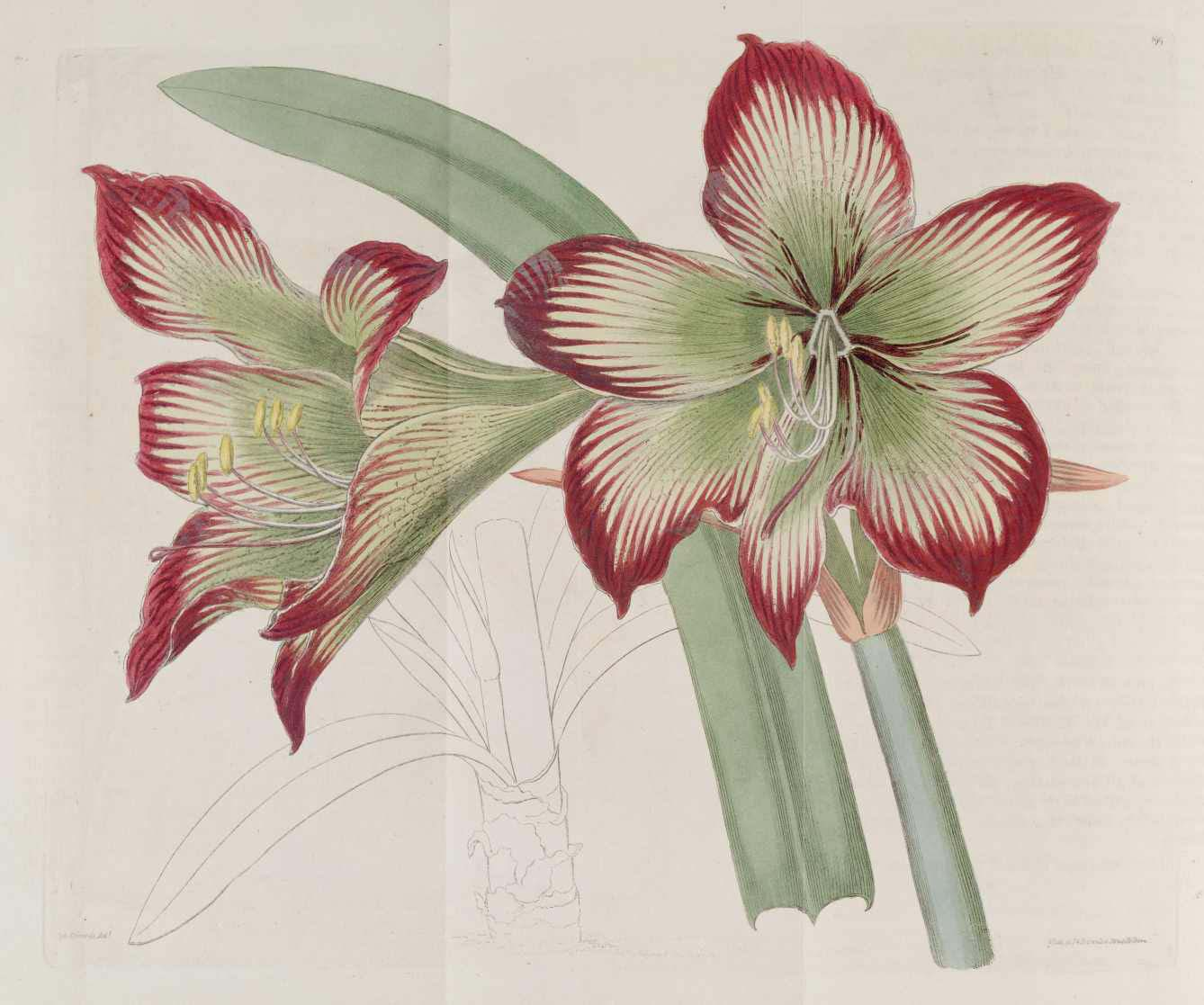
Amaryllis psittacina. Botanical Register

Hippeastrum psittacinum (Parrot Amaryllis) is a flowering perennial herbaceous bulbous plant, in the family Amaryllidaceae, native to Brazil.

== Description ==
Leaves, up to 8, strap like, length 45 cm. height 60 cm. Flowers, four trumpet shaped. Tubes short, green-white with spreading lobes, crimson stripes, and wavy crimson margins.

== Taxonomy ==
Described by John Bellenden Ker Gawler in 1817 as Amaryllis, but transferred to Hippeastrum by William Herbert in 1821.

‘The present is the fifth unrecorded Amaryllis from the Brazils which has been published in this work out of the collection of Mr. Griffin. To have been the first to bring within the sphere of science and into culture an equal number of plants, belonging to a same remote region, of a same genus, and all interesting, either on the score of curiosity or beauty, within little more than two years, has probably never before been the chance of any single collector in Europe. The bulb was sent about 3 years ago by Mr. E. Woodford, from Rio Janeiro; and flowered in Mr. Griffin's hothouse at South Lambeth in March last.’ Ker Gawler.

=== Heterotypic Synonyms ===
- Amaryllis illustris Vell., Fl. Flumin. 3: 131 (1829).
- Leopoldia illustris (Vell.) M.Roem., Fam. Nat. Syn. Monogr. 4: 130 (1847).
- Hippeastrum decoratum Lem., Jard. Fleur. 4: t. 338 (1854).
- Amaryllis psittacina var. decorata (Lem.) Traub & Uphof, Herbertia 6: 154 (1940).
- Hippeastrum illustre (Vell.) Dutilh, Taxon 46: 17 (1997).

=== Etymology ===
psittacinum: Latin like a parrot.

== Sources ==
- The Plant List (2012). "Hippeastrum petiolatum".
- GBIF: Hippeastrum petiolatum
- Pacific Bulb Society: Hippeastrum petiolatum
- "Hippeastrum petiolatum". Tropicos. Missouri Botanical Garden.
- Zuloaga, F. O., O. Morrone, M. J. Belgrano, C. Marticorena & E. Marchesi. (eds.) 2008. Catálogo de las Plantas Vasculares del Cono Sur (Argentina, Sur de Brasil, Chile, Paraguay y Uruguay). Monogr. Syst. Bot. Missouri Bot. Gard. 107. 2008 ISSN 2250-6365
- International Bulb Society: Hippeastrum petiolatum (image)
- Forzza, R. C. et al. 2010. 2010 Lista de espécies Flora do Brasil
