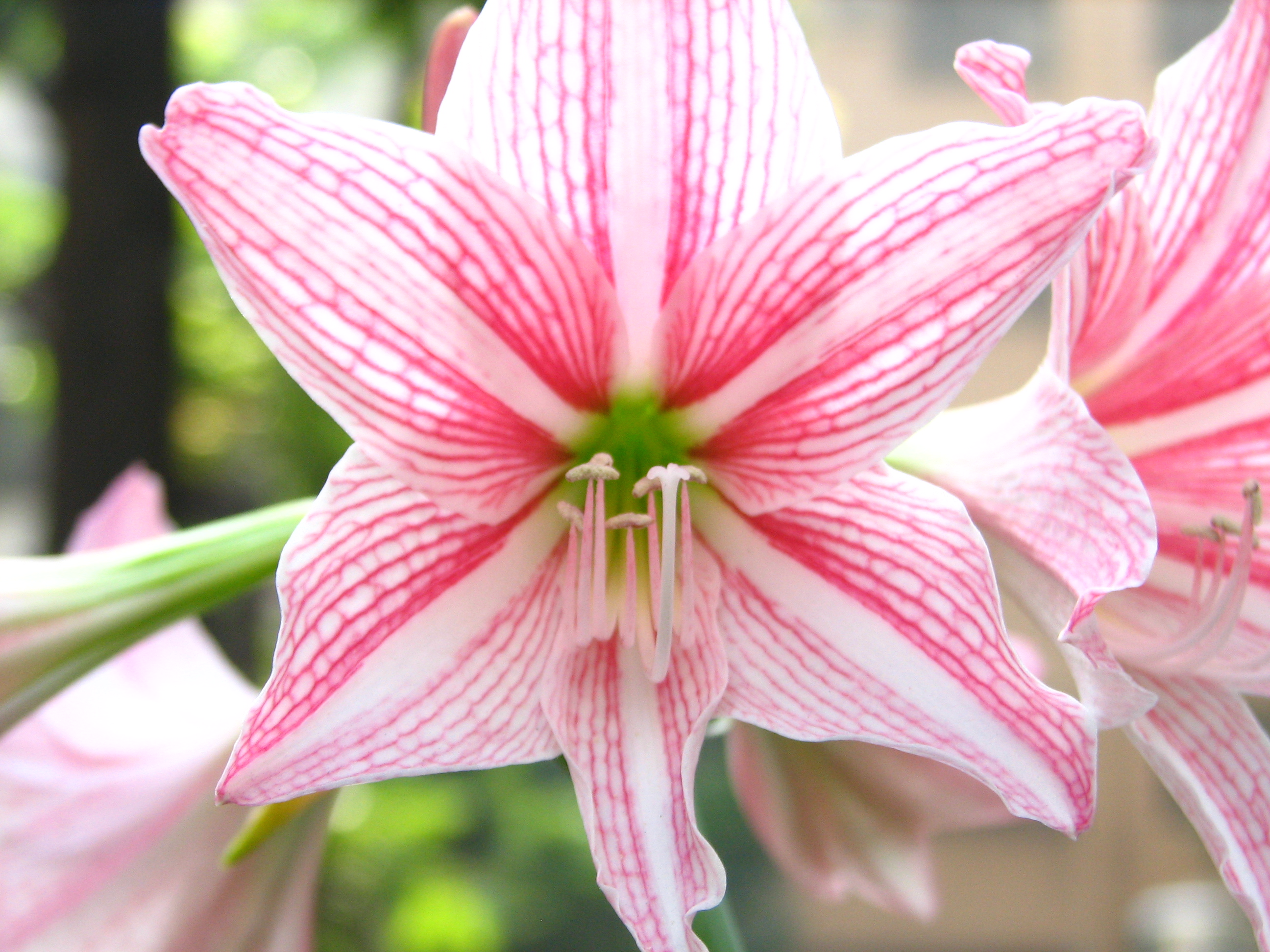

Scientific classification
- Kingdom: Plantae
- Clade: Tracheophytes
- Clade: Angiosperms
- Clade: Monocots
- Order: Asparagales
- Family: Amaryllidaceae
- Subfamily: Amaryllidoideae
- Genus: Hippeastrum
- Species: H. reticulatum

Binomial name
- Hippeastrum reticulatum (L'Hér.) Herb.

Synonyms
- Amaryllis reticulata; (See also World Checklist of Selected Plant Families).

= Hippeastrum reticulatum =

Species of flowering plant

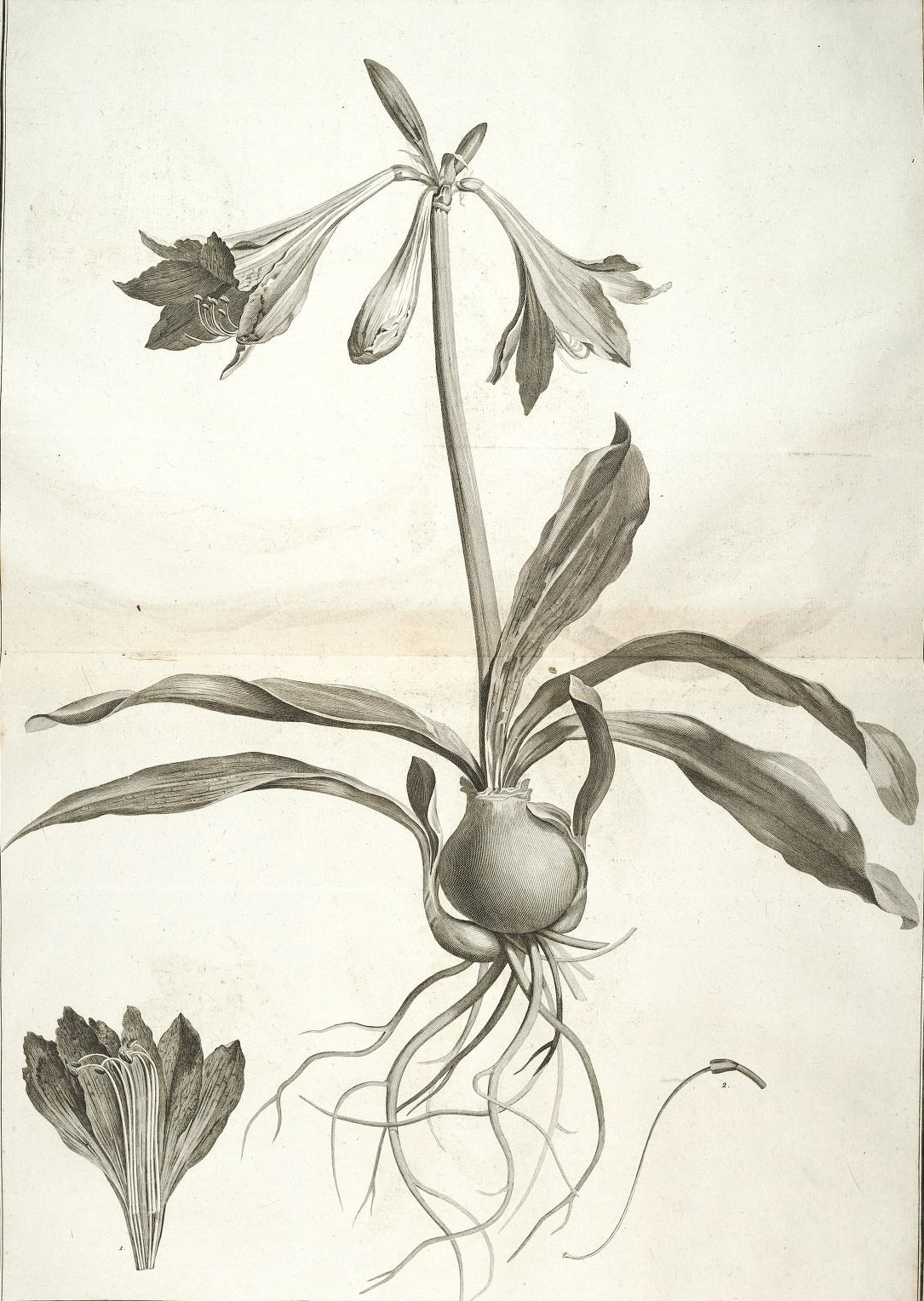
Original illustration by L'Héritier, 1788

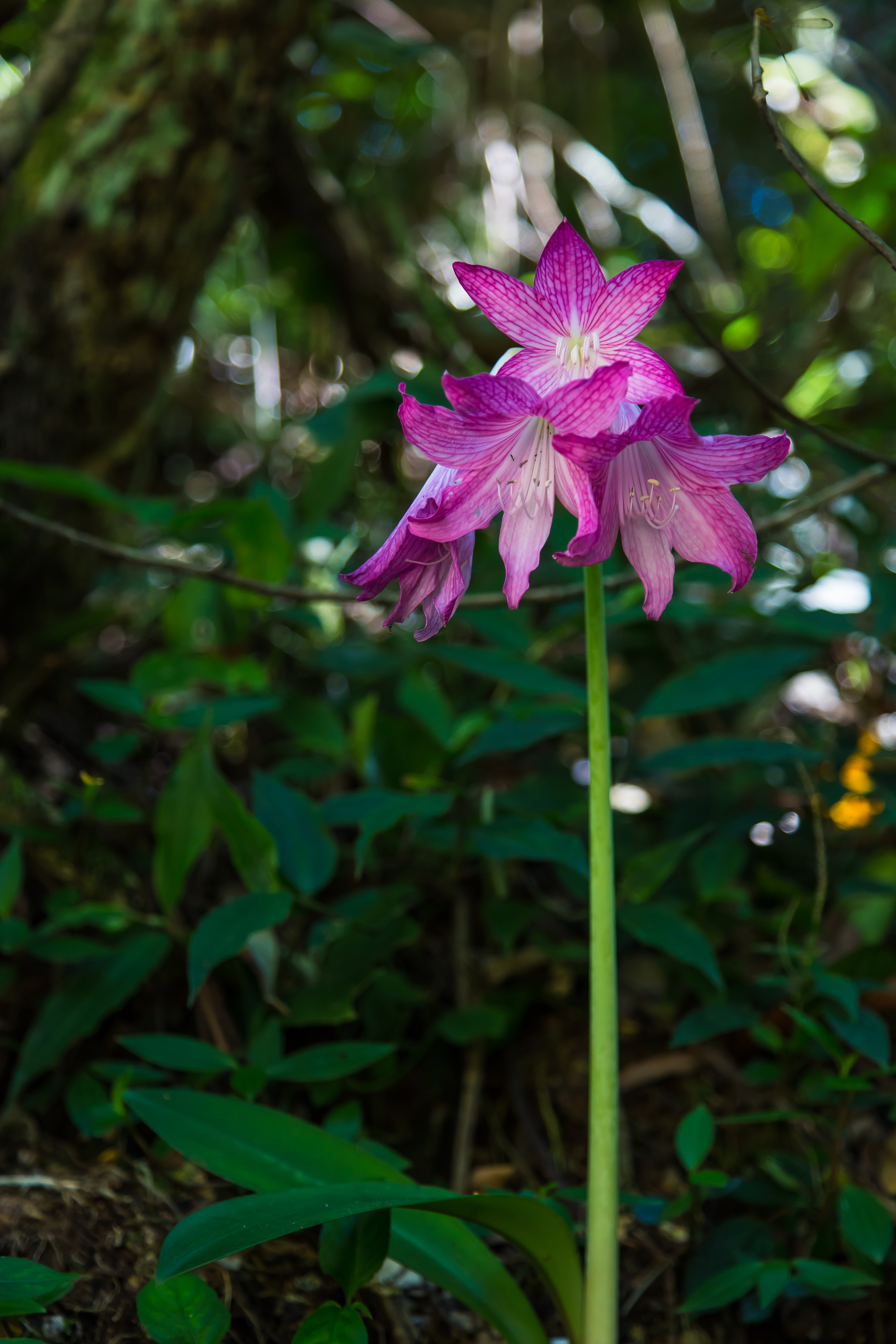

Hippeastrum reticulatum, the netted-veined amaryllis, is a flowering perennial herbaceous bulbous plant, in the family Amaryllidaceae, native to South America.

== Description ==
=== Vegetative characteristics ===
Hippeastrum reticulatum is a bulbous, terrestrial herb with 3.2–4.8 cm wide bulbs bearing lanceolate to oblanceolate, pseudopetiolate, up to 45 cm long, and 3.8–5.0 cm wide leaves.

=== Generative characteristics ===
The 6–8-flowered, scapose inflorescence with a 40.0–45.0 cm long, and 0.7–0.9 cm wide scape bears pedicellate, pink to white flowers. Each locule has up to 12 ovules. The capsule fruit with a bright red interior bears globose seeds.

=== Cytology ===
The chromosome count is 2n = 22.

== Taxonomy ==
Hippeastrum reticulatum was one of the earliest Hippeastrums to be discovered and was introduced to Europe in 1777 by Edward Whitaker Gray from Brazil, as documented by William Aiton in his Hortus Kewensis (1789). It was described by Charles Louis L'Héritier de Brutelle in 1788 as one of a number of species of Amaryllis, Amaryllis reticulata, it was later recognised by Herbert in 1824 as a member of the separate South American genus Hippeastrum rather than Amaryllis which is confined to South Africa, and thus as Hippeastrum reticulatum (L'Hér.) Herb., Bot. Mag. 51: t. 2475 (1824).

=== Subdivision ===
Some sources follow Herbert (1837) in stating that there are two varieties, reticulatum and striatifolium. A third variety, strictum Herb., is sometimes also included. This division into varieties is not accepted by the World Checklist.

=== Etymology ===
The specific epithet reticulatum is Latin for "netted", referring to the venation of the petals.

== Distribution and habitat ==
From Argentina to Brazil, growing in wet sandy soil. In Brazil they are found under Mussununga forest whose smaller canopy allows more light to reach the forest floor.

== Ecology ==
Hippeastrum reticulatum blooms in late summer to autumn, with an active growing season of autumn to early winter, and requires a semi-dormant period of 4–6 weeks during late winter and early spring. The species is unusual amongst Hippeastrum, in being self-fertile.

== Conservation ==
It is vulnerable to local extinction.

== Bibliography ==
=== Historical ===
- Aiton, W. (1789). Hortus Kewensis 3 vols. London: George Nicol.
- Herbert, W. (1819). "Amaryllis reticulata. β. striatifolia Griffin's netted-veined Amaryllis. Coburgia. Herbert". Curtis's Botanical Magazine. 47: T. 2113 1–6.
- Herbert, W. (1824). "Amaryllis subbarbatum. Slightly-bearded Knights-star-lily". Curtis's Botanical Magazine. 51: T. 2475 1–2.
- Herbert, William (1837). Amaryllidaceae: Preceded by an Attempt to Arrange the Monocotyledonous Orders, and Followed by a Treatise on Cross-bred Vegetables, and Supplement. London: Ridgway.
- L'Héritier de Brutelle, Charles Louis (1788). Sertum Anglicum, seu, Plantae rariores quae in hortis juxta Londinum: imprimis in horto regio Kewensi excoluntur, ab anno 1786 ad annum 1787 observatae. Paris: Petri Francisci Didot.

=== Databases ===
- GBIF: Hippeastrum reticulatum
- "Hippeastrum reticulatum Herb". Tropicos. Missouri Botanical Garden. 2016.
- The Plant List (2013). "Hippeastrum reticulatum (L'Hér.) Herb".
- "World Checklist of Selected Plant Families". Royal Botanic Gardens, Kew.

=== Flora ===
- Zuloaga, Fernando O.; Morrone, Osvaldo; Belgrano, Manuel J., eds. (2008). "Hippeastrum". Catálogo de las plantas vasculares del Cono Sur: (Argentina, Sur de Brasil, Chile, Paraguay y Uruguay) (Monogr. Syst. Bot. Missouri Bot. Gard. 107). St. Louis, Mo.: Missouri Botanical Garden. ISBN 978-1-930723-70-2.
- Maia, Leonor Costa (2016). "Lista de Espécies da Flora do Brasil". INCT – Herbário Virtual da Flora e dos Fungos. Recife: Institutos Nacionais de Ciência e Teconologia. Archived from the original on 21 October 2020.
- "Brazilian Flora 2020". Reflora. Flora do Brasil 2020. Institute of Research, Rio de Janeiro Botanical Garden. 2016.
- "INCT – Herbário Virtual da Flora e dos Fungos" (in Portuguese and English). Institutos Nacionais de Ciência e Teconologia. 2016.

=== Other ===
- Griffith, Chuck (2005). "reticulatus". Dictionary of Botanical Epithets.
- "Pacific Bulb Society Wiki". Pacific Bulb Society. 2015.
- Tsang, Dennis. "Hippeastrum reticulatum var. striatifolium". Gallery of the World's Bulbs. International Bulb Society. Archived from the original on 4 December 2013.
