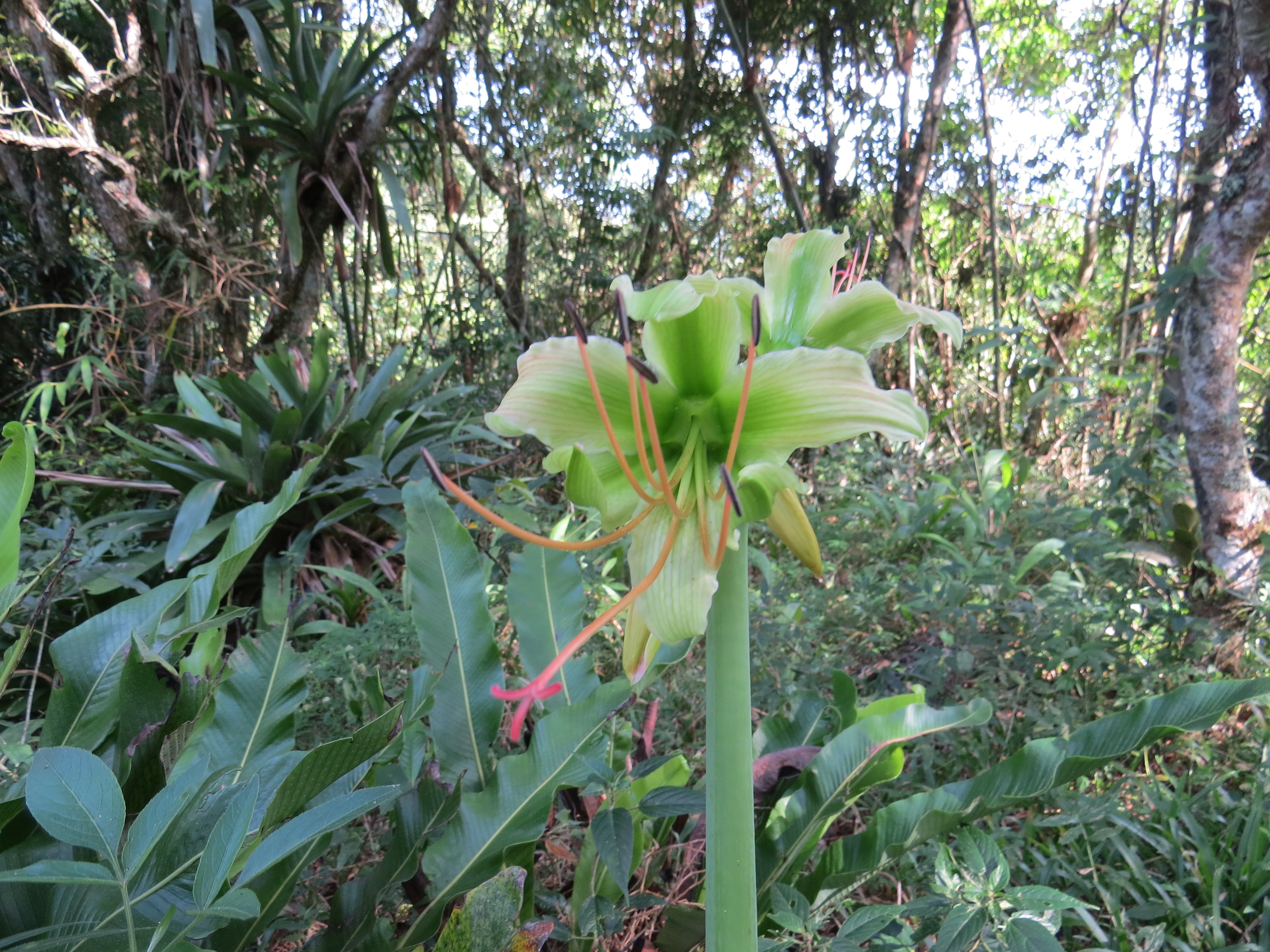

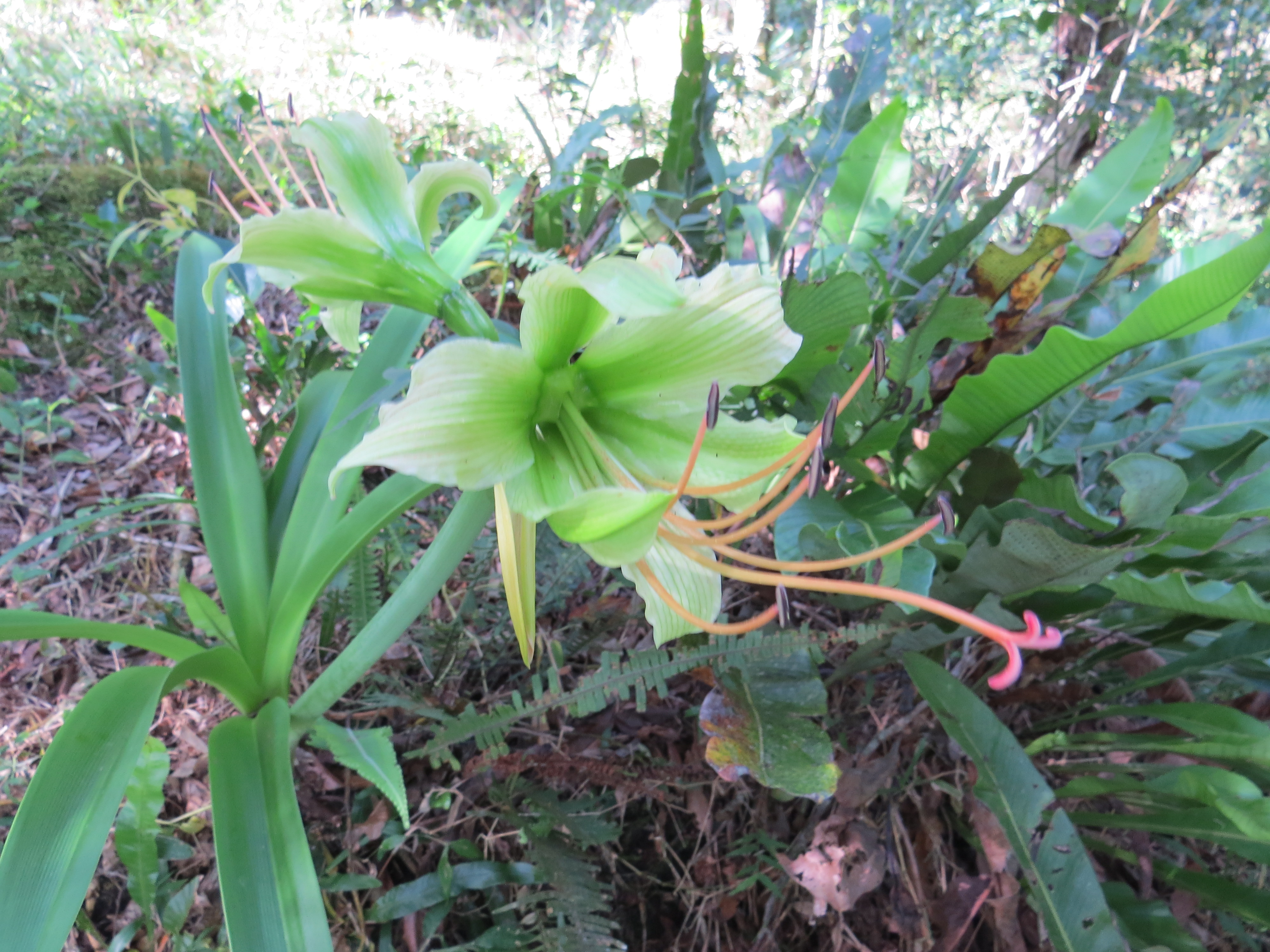
- Hippeastrum calyptratum in its natural habitat close to Vale de Bonsucesso, Teresópolis, State of Rio de Janeiro, Brazil

Scientific classification
- Kingdom: Plantae
- Clade: Tracheophytes
- Clade: Angiosperms
- Clade: Monocots
- Order: Asparagales
- Family: Amaryllidaceae
- Subfamily: Amaryllidoideae
- Genus: Hippeastrum
- Species: H. calyptratum

Binomial name
- Hippeastrum calyptratum (Ker Gawl.) Herb.
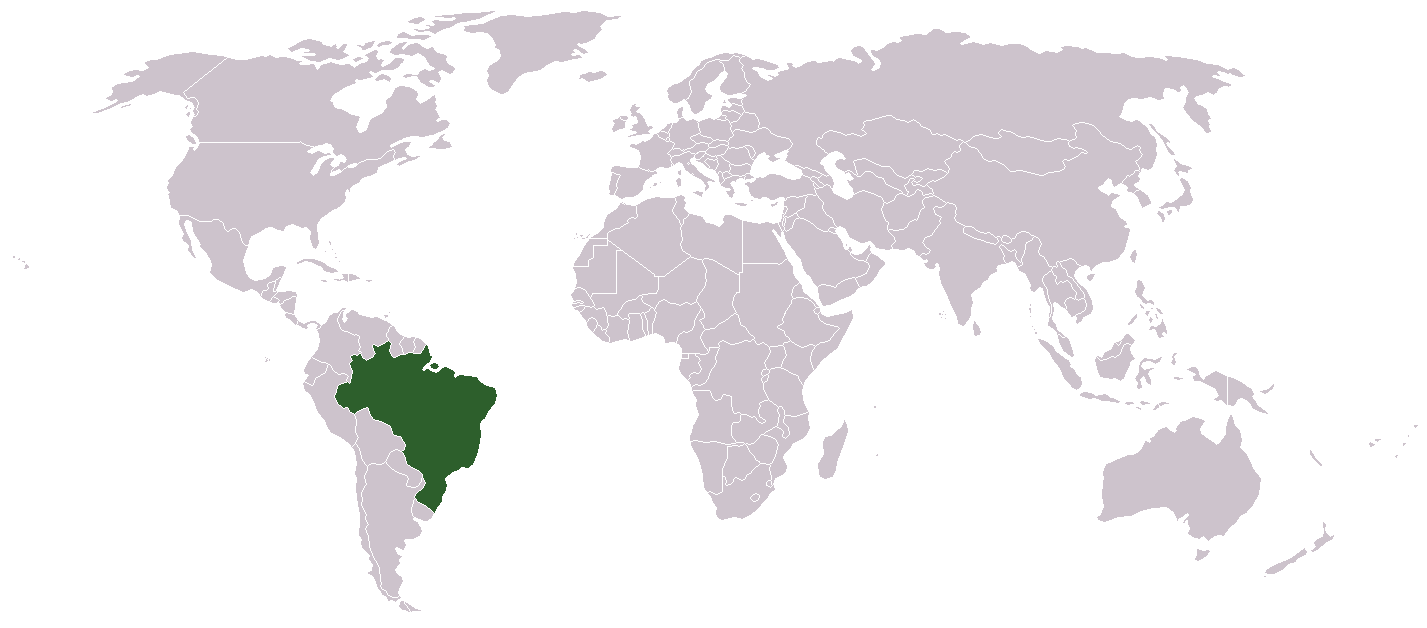

- Approximate distribution of Hippeastrum calyptratum in Southeast Brazil

Synonyms
- Amaryllis calyptrata Ker Gawl.; Omphalissa calyptrata (Ker Gawl.) Salisb.; Amaryllis calyptrata Hoffmanns.; Amaryllis flavovirens Schott ex Steud.; Amaryllis fulvovirens Schott; Amaryllis unguiculata Mart. ex Schult. & Schult.f.; Amaryllis viridorchida Traub; Hippeastrum bulbulosum var. unguiculatum (Mart. ex Schult. & Schult.f.) Herb.; Trisacarpis falcata Raf.

= Hippeastrum calyptratum =

Species of flowering plant

Hippeastrum calyptratum is a flowering perennial herbaceous bulbous plant, in the family Amaryllidaceae, native to Brazil.

== Description ==
This species has an approximately 7.5 cm wide, globose bulb, which is enclosed in persistent, brown leaf bases. The bulbs bear 5-6, approximately 45 – 60 cm long, 5 cm wide, light green leaves. The green flowers are produced in autumn on 2-3 flowered umbels, which are supported by terete, green, about 60 cm long, and about 1.3 - 1.9 cm wide peduncles. Semi-discoid, flattened seeds are produced in globose-compressed capsule fruits.

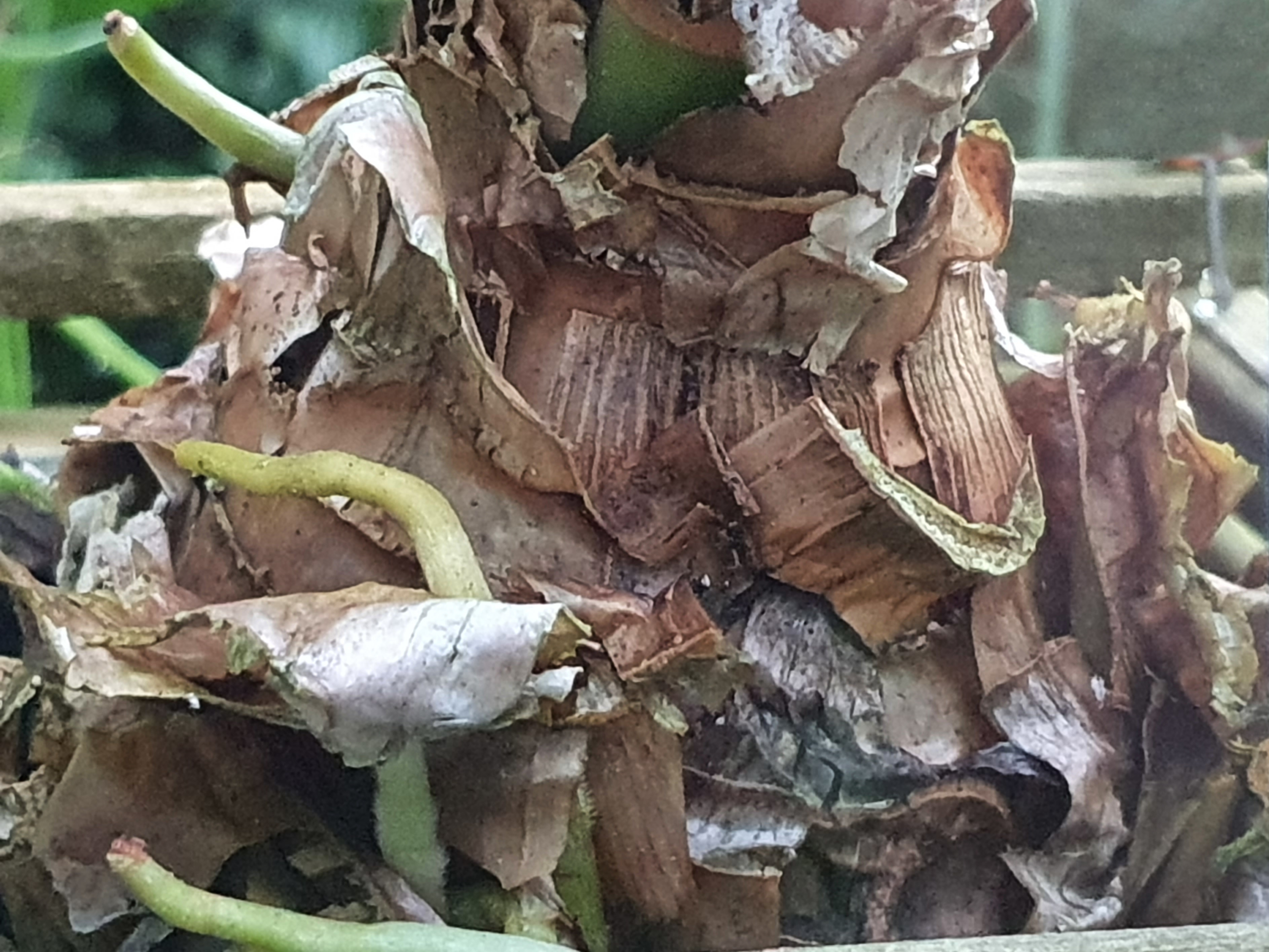
Detail of a Hippeastrum calyptratum (Ker Gawl.) Herb. bulb

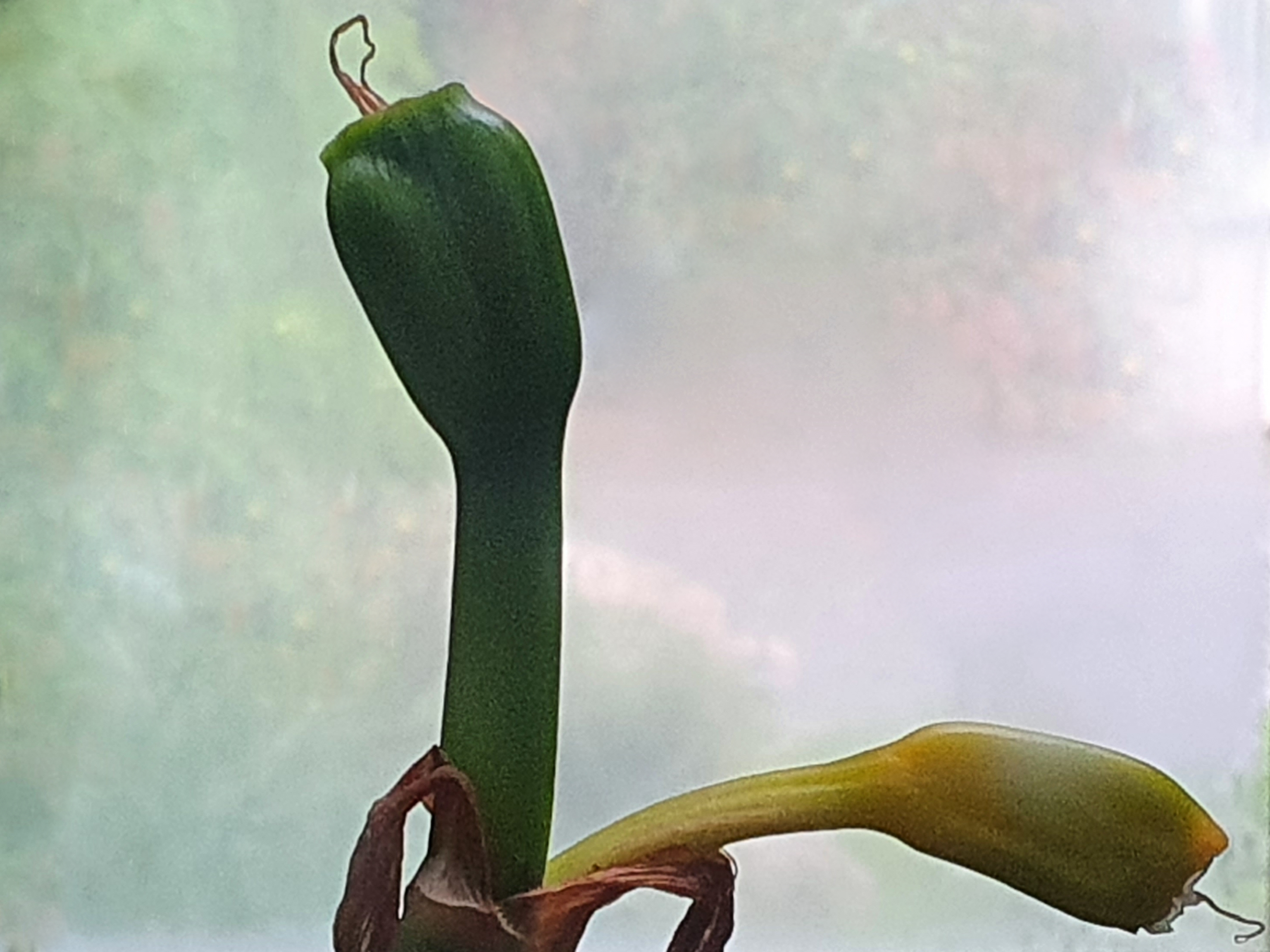
Two immature Hippeastrum calyptratum (Ker Gawl.) Herb. capsule fruits

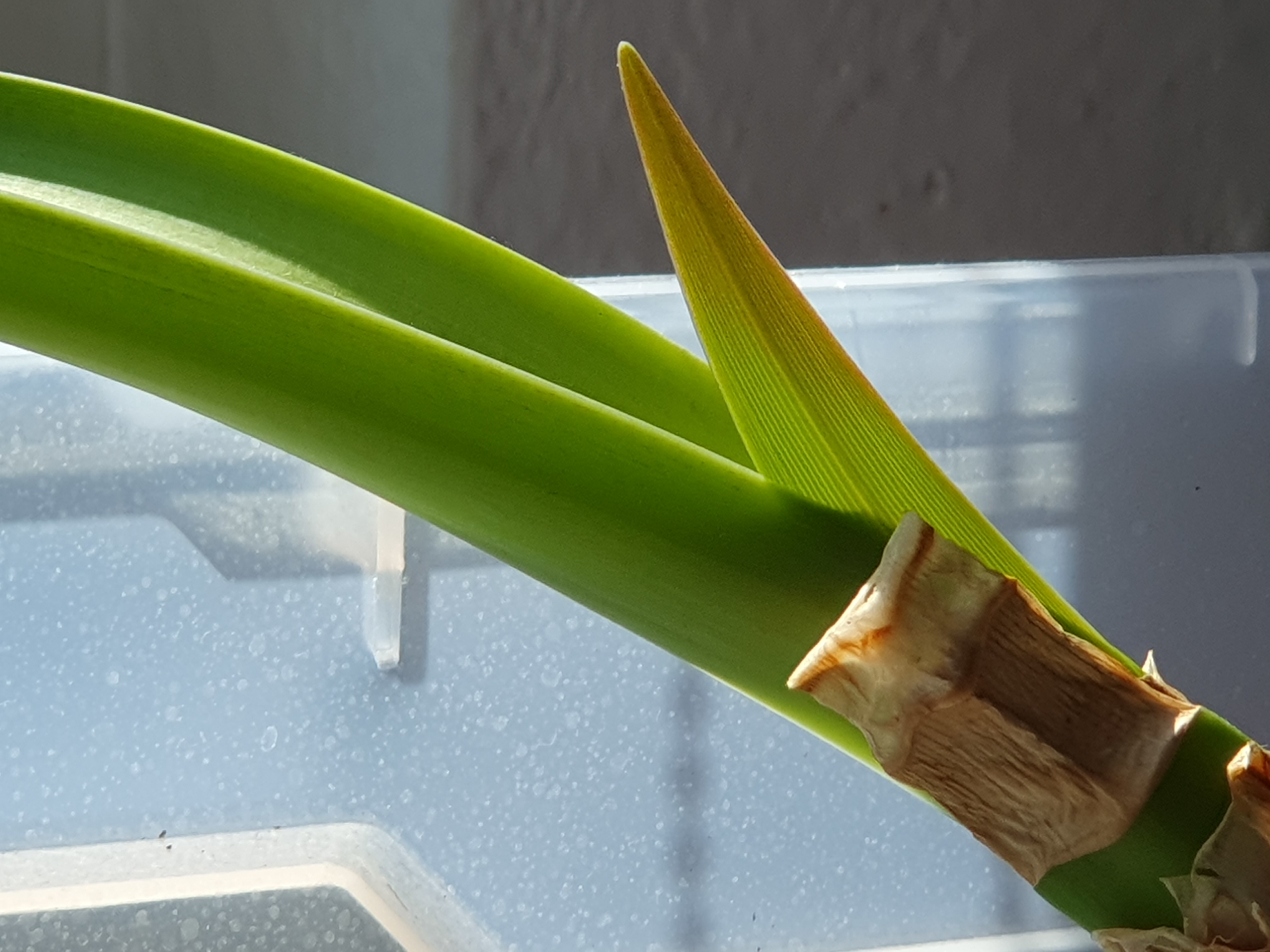
Developing Hippeastrum calyptratum (Ker Gawl.) Herb. leaf with reddish suffusion towards the apex and visible parallel leaf venation

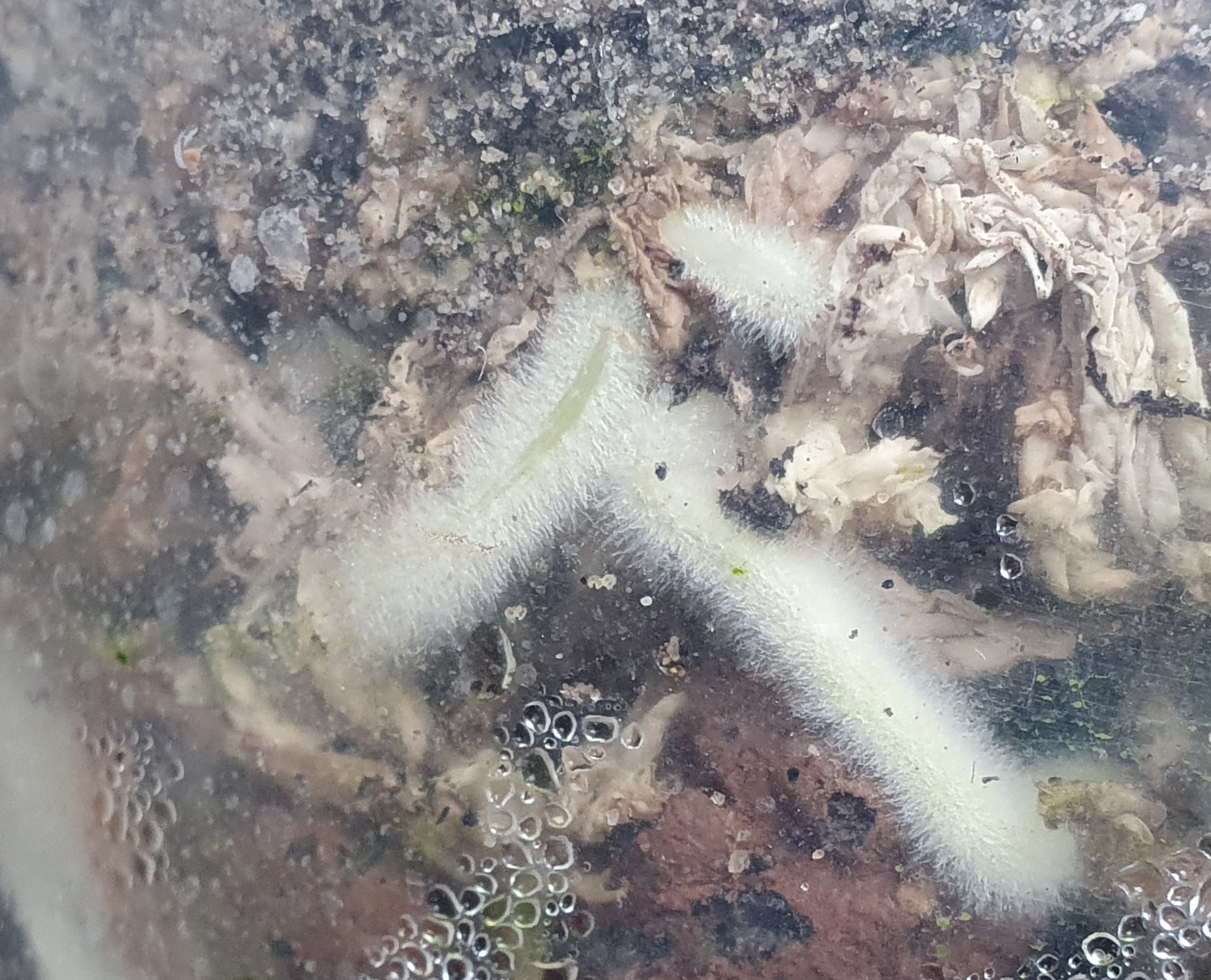
Detail of Hippeastrum calyptratum (Ker Gawl.) Herb. roots

== Conservation ==
This species is probably threatened by extinction, however not enough data is currently available on its distribution, and thus the proposed IUCN conservation Status is Data Deficient (DD).

== Ecology ==
The flowers are pollinated by bat species. It occurs in humid Atlantic Rainforest at elevations of 1200 m above sea level growing epiphytically on mossy trees or as a lithophyte on rocks.

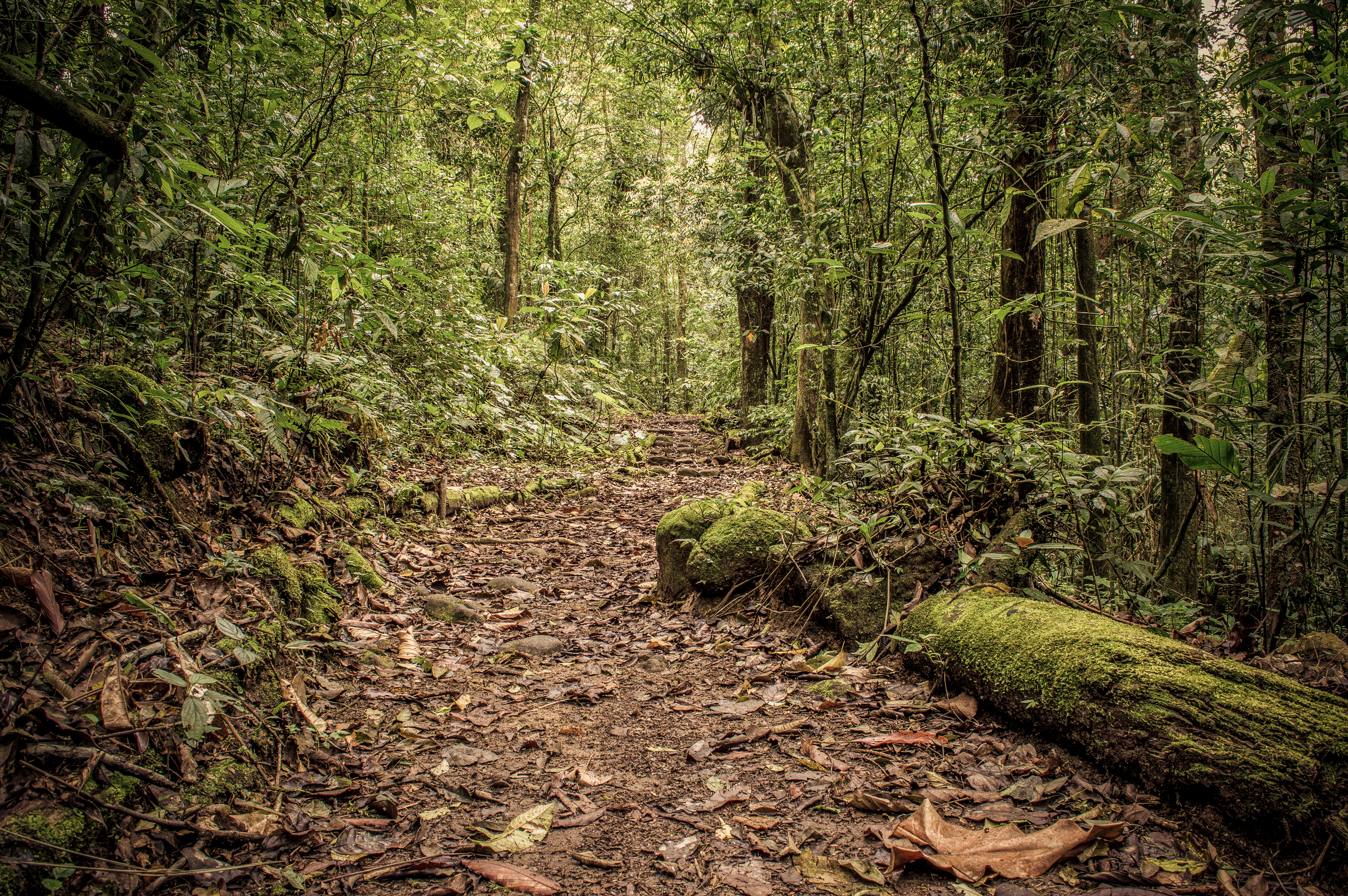
Natural habitat of Hippeastrum calyptratum

== Cytology ==
The diploid chromosome count of this species is 2n = 22.

== Physiology ==
Several crinine-type alkaloids have been isolated from tissue of this species. The floral scent, which has been described as stale, sour, fermented, or similar to burnt plastic is composed of the following compounds: 1,8-cineole, perillene, camphor, linalool, limonene, g-terpinene, b-myrcene, sabinene, a-pinene, d-3-carene, and 3-hexanone.

== Taxonomy ==
This species was first described under the name Amaryllis calyptrata by John Bellenden Ker Gawler (Ker Gawl.) in 1817. Later it was transferred to the genus Hippeastrum under the name Hippeastrum calyptratum by William Herbert (Herb.) in 1821.

== Etymology ==
The specific epithet calyptratum is derived from the Latin calyptratum meaning "bearing a calyptra" or the Greek kalypto, kalyptra meaning "to hide" or "veil".

== Cultivation ==
The cultivation is thought to be difficult by some growers unfamiliar with the specific needs of epiphytes. In contrast to other members of the genus, the substrate should be coarse, aerated, and well drained for this species.

== Sources ==
- The Plant List (2012). "Hippeastrum calyptratum".
- GBIF:Hippeastrum calyptratum
