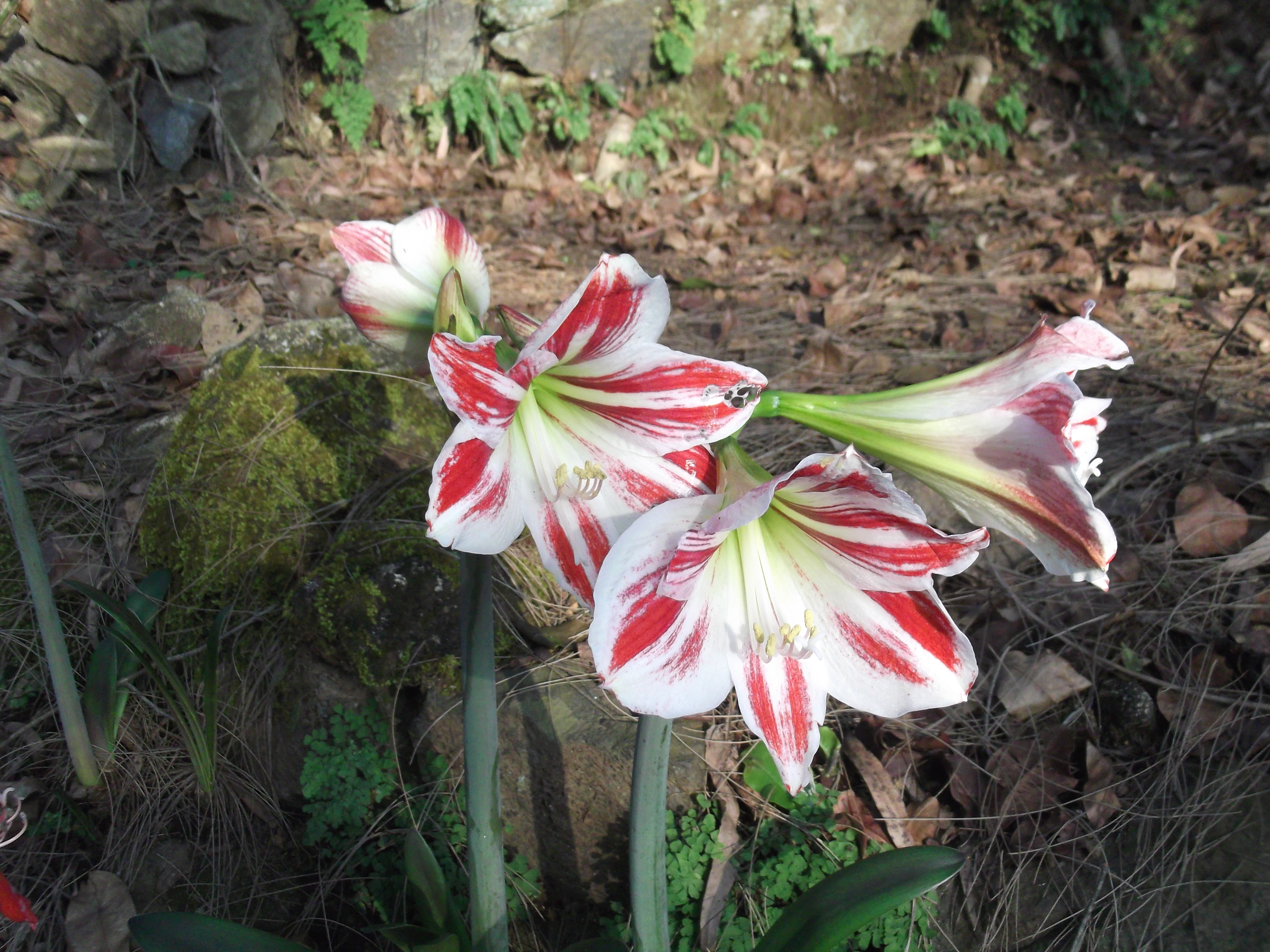
- In Yercaud, India
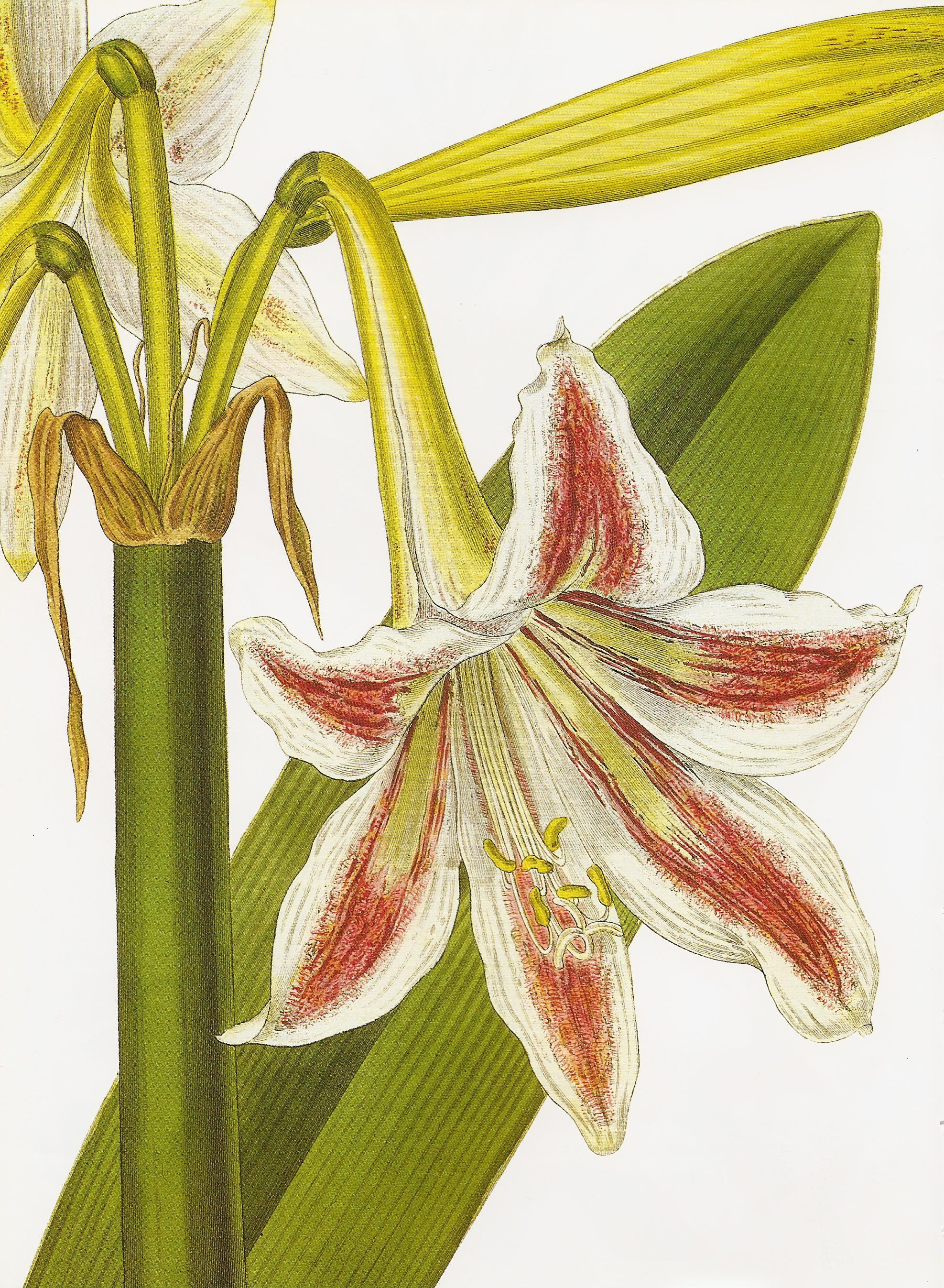
- Botanical illustration

Scientific classification
- Kingdom: Plantae
- Clade: Tracheophytes
- Clade: Angiosperms
- Clade: Monocots
- Order: Asparagales
- Family: Amaryllidaceae
- Subfamily: Amaryllidoideae
- Genus: Hippeastrum
- Species: H. vittatum

Binomial name
- Hippeastrum vittatum (L'Hér.) Herb.

Synonyms
- List: Amaryllis lineata Colla; Amaryllis vittata L'Hér.; Amaryllis vittata subsp. guarapuavae Ravenna; Amaryllis vittata var. harrisoniae Lindl.; Amaryllis vittata var. major Lindl.; Amaryllis vittata var. tweedieana (Herb.) Traub; Chonais vittata (L'Hér.) Salisb.; Hippeastrum ambiguum var. tweedieanum Herb.; Hippeastrum vittatum var. harrisoniae (Lindl.) Herb.; Hippeastrum vittatum var. latifolium Herb.

= Hippeastrum vittatum =

Species of plant

Hippeastrum vittatum, the superb amaryllis, is a species of flowering plant in the family Amaryllidaceae. It is native to western Bolivia, southern Brazil, and Misiones Province, Argentina, and it has been introduced to a number of other locales around the world. A bulbous geophyte, it is typically found in the seasonally dry tropics. With Hippeastrum reginae it is a parent of Hippeastrum × johnsonii, an ornamental that gained the Royal Horticultural Society's Award of Garden Merit in 2012.
