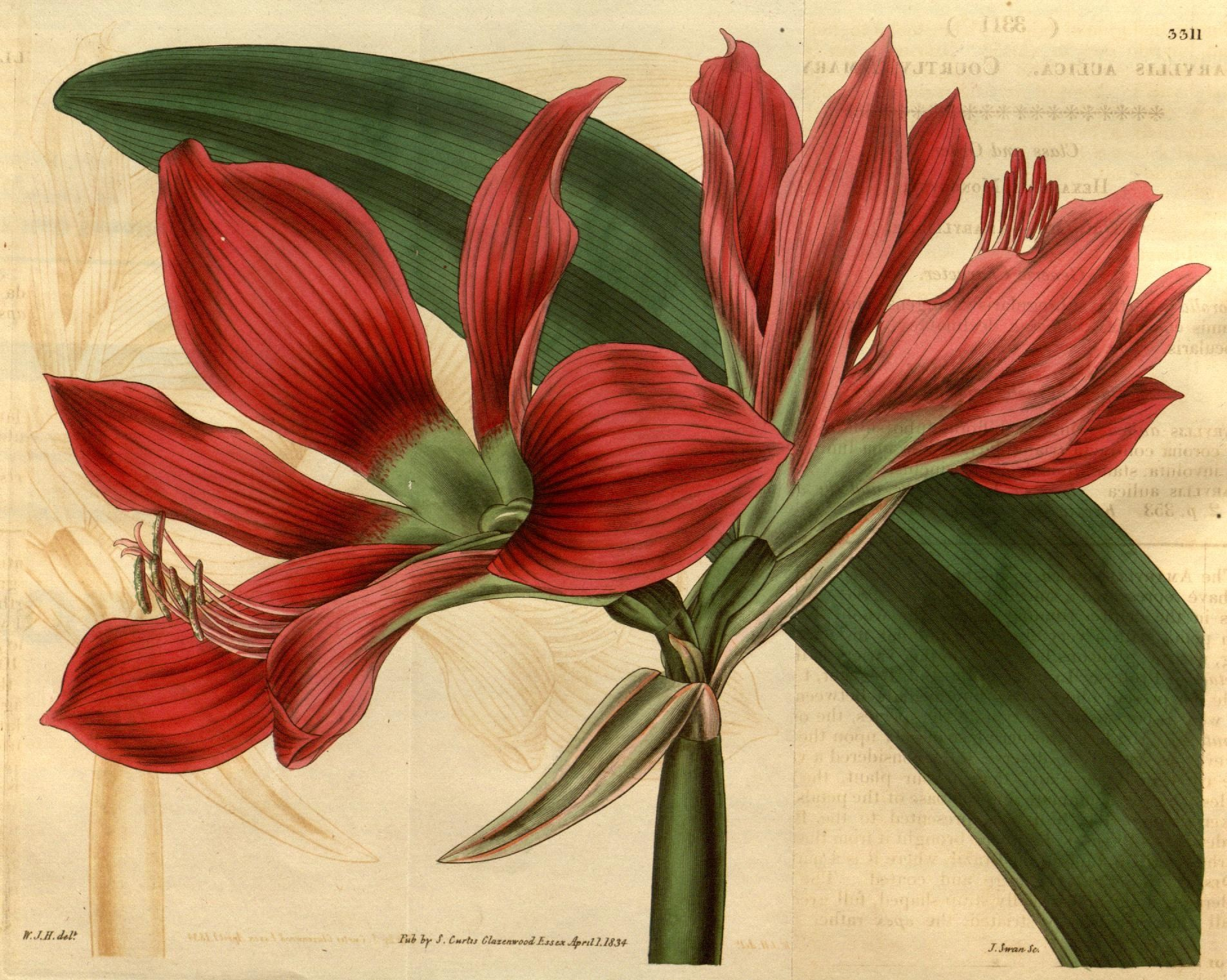

Scientific classification
- Kingdom: Plantae
- Clade: Tracheophytes
- Clade: Angiosperms
- Clade: Monocots
- Order: Asparagales
- Family: Amaryllidaceae
- Subfamily: Amaryllidoideae
- Genus: Hippeastrum
- Species: H. aulicum

Binomial name
- Hippeastrum aulicum (Ker Gawl.) Herb.
- Hippeastrum aulicum is native to Brazil and Paraguay

Synonyms
- Amaryllis aulica Ker Gawl.; Omphalissa aulica (Ker Gawl.) Salisb.; Amaryllis aulica var. platypetala Lindl.; Amaryllis heuseriana (H.Karst.) Ravenna; Amaryllis heuseriana f. campanulata Ravenna; Amaryllis robusta Otto & A.Dietr.; Amaryllis rougieri Carrière; Amaryllis tettaui Neubert; Aulica latifolia Raf.; Aulica platypetala (Lindl.) Raf.; Aulica striata Raf.; Hippeastrum aulicum var. platypetalum (Lindl.) Herb.; Hippeastrum aulicum f. robustum (A.Dietr. ex Walp.) Voss; Hippeastrum heuserianum H.Karst.; Hippeastrum robustum A.Dietr. ex Walp.; Hippeastrum tweedieanum Herb.; Trisacarpis rubra Raf.

= Hippeastrum aulicum =

Species of plant

Hippeastrum aulicum
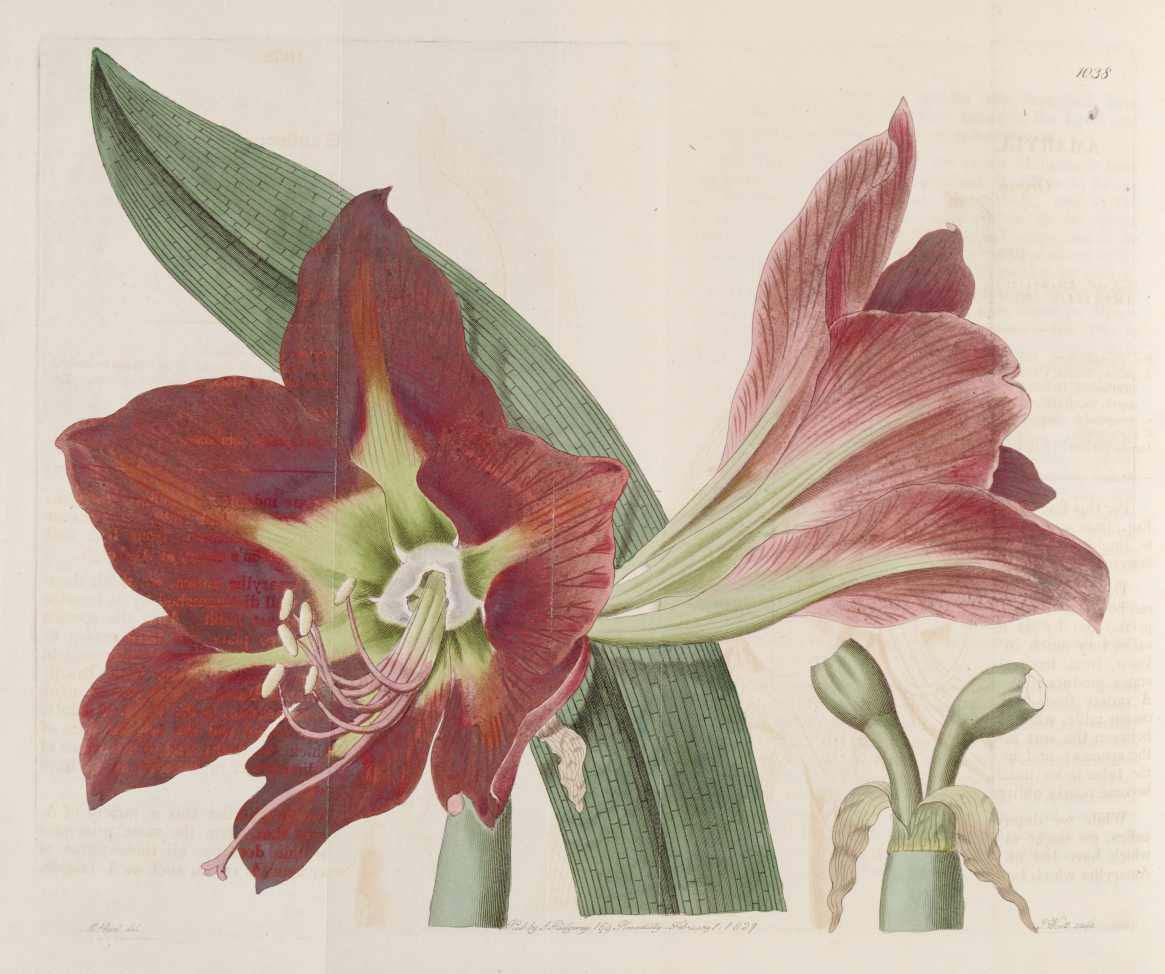
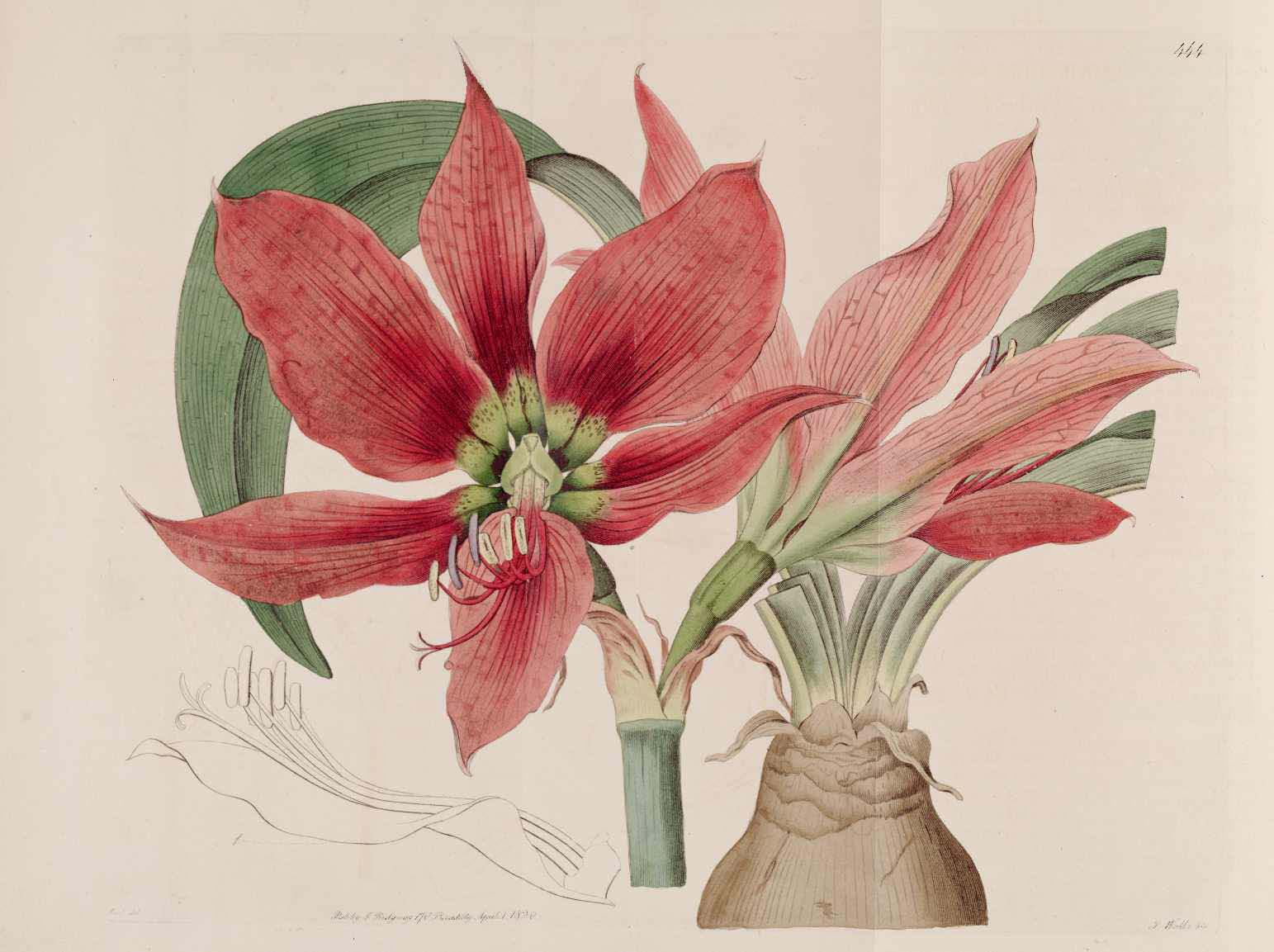
Botanical Register 1820, 1826

Hippeastrum aulicum, the Lily of the Palace, is a bulbous perennial, in the family Amaryllidaceae, native to the Atlantic Forest and Cerrado ecoregions from Brazil to Paraguay, in South America.

== Description ==
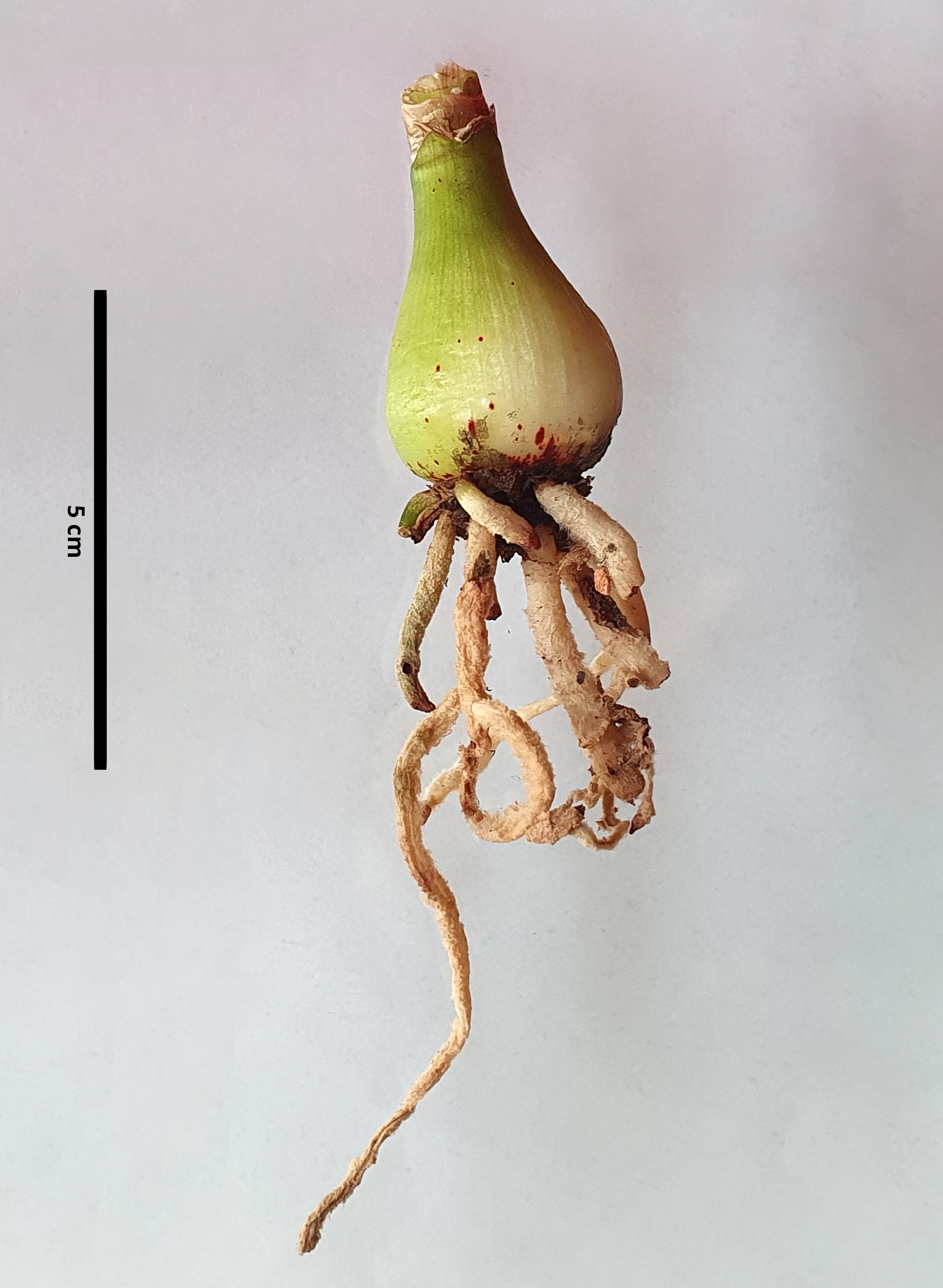
Immature Hippeastrum aulicum (Ker Gawl.) Herb. bulb

Hippeastrum aulicum is a bulbous epiphyte, growing on rocks and trees which has large scarlet flowers with a green throat, usually with four flowers to a stem. It blooms in late summer and autumn.

== Taxonomy ==
Hippeastrum aulicum was first described by Ker Gawler in 1883.

=== Synonyms ===
See The Plant List

- Amaryllis aulica Ker Gawl.
- Amaryllis aulica var. platypetala Lindl.
- Amaryllis heuseriana (H.Karst.) Ravenna
- Amaryllis heuseriana f. campanulata Ravenna
- Amaryllis robusta Otto & A.Dietr. [Illegitimate]
- Amaryllis rougieri Carrière
- Amaryllis tettanii auct.
- Aulica latifolia Raf.
- Aulica platypetala (Lindl.) Raf.
- Aulica striata Raf.
- Hippeastrum aulicum var. platypetalum (Lindl.) Herb.
- Hippeastrum aulicum f. robustum (A.Dietr. ex Walp.) Voss
- Hippeastrum heuserianum H.Karst.
- Hippeastrum robustum A.Dietr. ex Walp.
- Hippeastrum tweedianum Herb.
- Omphalissa aulica (Ker Gawl.) Salisb.
- Trisacarpis rubra Raf.

=== Etymology ===
The species name aulicum comes from the Latin, meaning 'princely'.

== Cultivation ==
Hippeastrum aulicum is cultivated by specialty flower bulb nurseries as an ornamental plant.

== Sources ==
- "List of Species of the Brazilian Flora". Reflora. Rio de Janeiro Botanical Garden.
- Zuloaga, F. O., O. Morrone, M. J. Belgrano, C. Marticorena & E. Marchesi. (eds.) 2008. Catálogo de las Plantas Vasculares del Cono Sur (Argentina, Sur de Brasil, Chile, Paraguay y Uruguay). Monogr. Syst. Bot. Missouri Bot. Gard. 107(1): i–xcvi, 1–983; 107(2): i–xx, 985–2286; 107(3): i–xxi, 2287–3348.
