= Hippeastrum petiolatum =

Scientific classification
- Kingdom: Plantae
- Clade: Tracheophytes
- Clade: Angiosperms
- Clade: Monocots
- Order: Asparagales
- Family: Amaryllidaceae
- Subfamily: Amaryllidoideae
- Genus: Hippeastrum
- Species: H. petiolatum

Binomial name
- Hippeastrum petiolatum Pax

Synonyms
- Amaryllis petiolata (Pax) Traub & Uphof

Species of flowering plant

Hippeastrum petiolatum (Azucena de Río) is a flowering perennial herbaceous bulbous plant, in the family Amaryllidaceae, distributed from Paraguay to Uruguay and Argentina.

== Description ==
Hippeastrum petiolatum grows to a height of 30–40 cm. Leaves are lanceolate, and dark green, forming a basal rosette around 60 cm in diameter. They grow to a length of 20–50 cm. There are up to three scapes per bulb. The paraperigonium consists of minute scales at the throat of the tepal tube, whose segments are unequal and ruffled and 1–2 cm broad at the middle and 15 cm long. Perigone 6–7 cm. The showy flowers are 10 cm in diameter, scarlet-red with purple veins, greenish-yellow in the throat and usually 3–4 in number but may be 5 rarely. Stigma trifid. Bulbs large (10 to 15 cm in diameter).

== Taxonomy ==
Described by Ferdinand Albin Pax in 1889.

=== Heterotypic Synonyms ===
- Hippeastrum flammigerum E.Holmb., Anales Mus. Nac. Buenos Aires, ser. 3, 1: 411 (1902).
- Amaryllis flammigera (E.Holmb.) Traub & Uphof, Herbertia 5: 127 (1938).
- Amaryllis argilagae Traub, Pl. Life 23: 59 (1967).
- Amaryllis petiolata subsp. cochunensis Ravenna, Pl. Life 26: 78 (1970).
- Hippeastrum argilagae (Traub) Dutilh, Taxon 46: 16 (1997).

== Cultivation ==
Full sun to part shade, moist but well drained soil, or pots. Leaves may persist all year under optimum conditions. Reproduction is solely by lateral bulbils, and bears no fruit.

== Ecology ==
Spring flowering.

== Uses ==
Cut flowers.

== Sources ==
- The Plant List (2012). "Hippeastrum petiolatum".
- GBIF: Hippeastrum petiolatum
- Pacific Bulb Society: Hippeastrum petiolatum
- "Hippeastrum petiolatum". Tropicos. Missouri Botanical Garden.
- International Bulb Society: Hippeastrum petiolatum (image)
