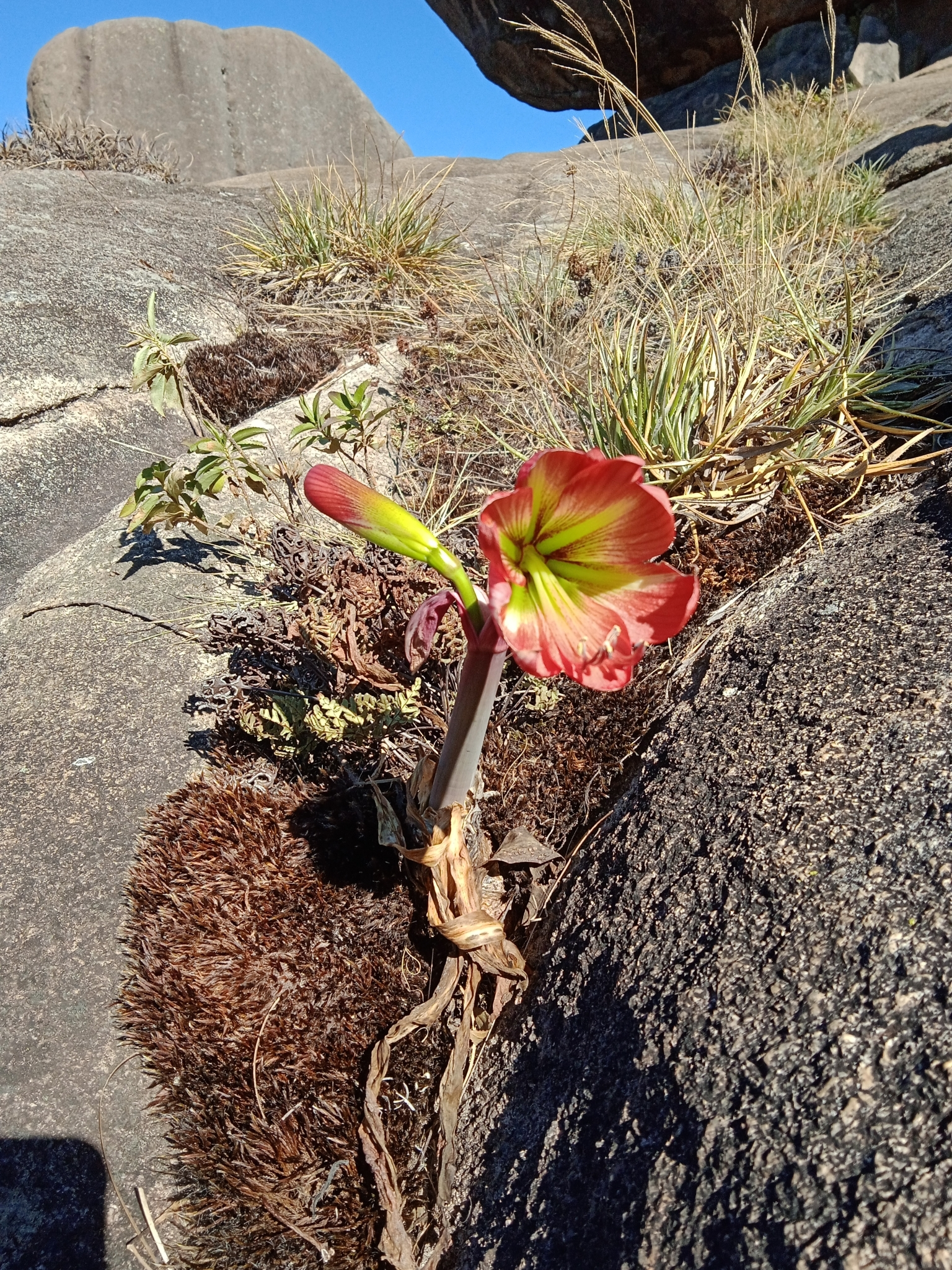

Scientific classification
- Kingdom: Plantae
- Clade: Tracheophytes
- Clade: Angiosperms
- Clade: Monocots
- Order: Asparagales
- Family: Amaryllidaceae
- Subfamily: Amaryllidoideae
- Genus: Hippeastrum
- Species: H. morelianum

Binomial name
- Hippeastrum morelianum Lem.

= Hippeastrum morelianum =

Species of plant

Hippeastrum morelianum is a species of plant of the family Amaryllidaceae found in the southwest of Brazil. It grows to 50 cm in height.
