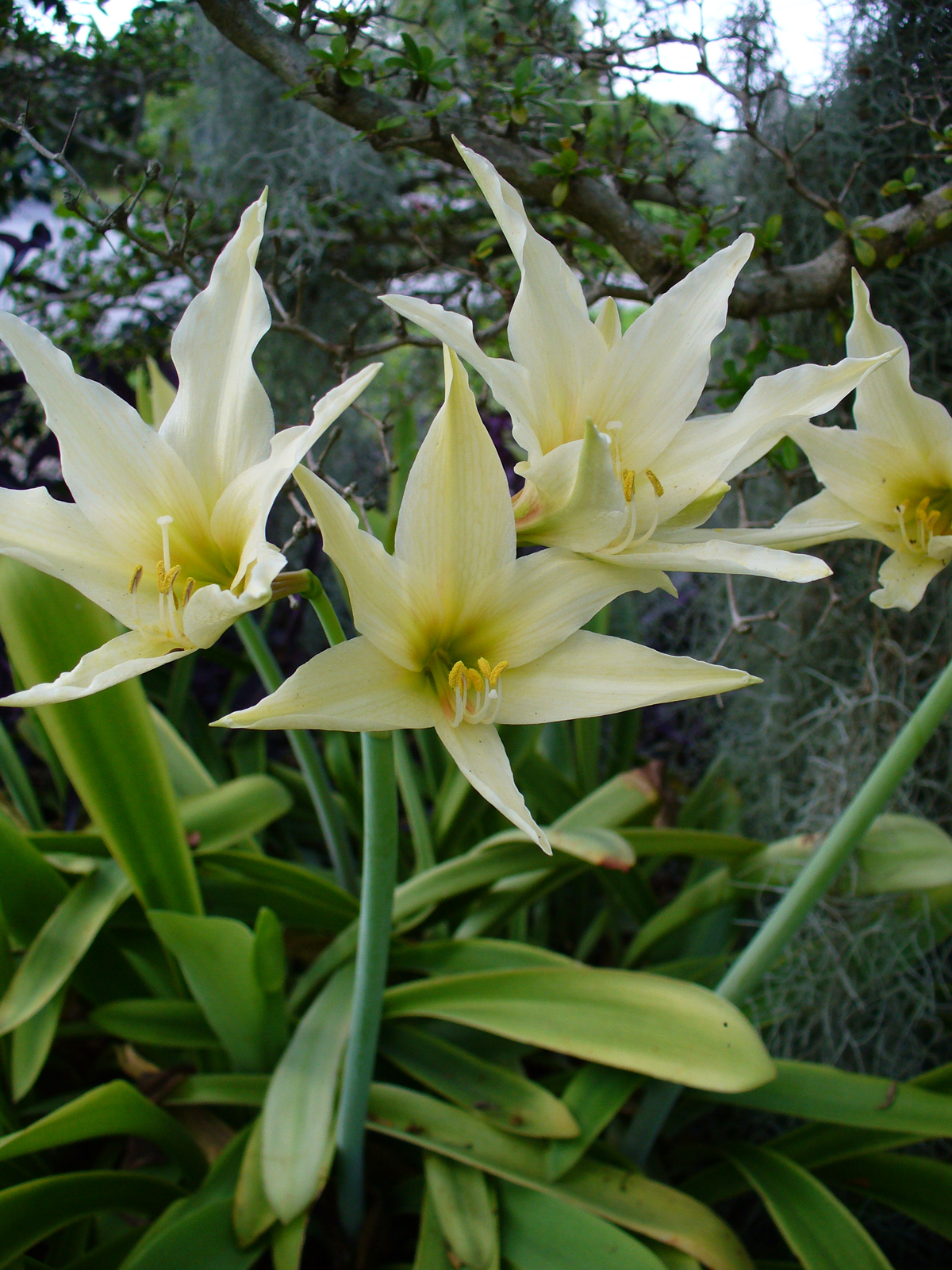

Scientific classification
- Kingdom: Plantae
- Clade: Tracheophytes
- Clade: Angiosperms
- Clade: Monocots
- Order: Asparagales
- Family: Amaryllidaceae
- Subfamily: Amaryllidoideae
- Genus: Hippeastrum
- Species: H. evansiae

Binomial name
- Hippeastrum evansiae (Traub & I.S.Nelson) H.E.Moore

Synonyms
- Amaryllis evansiae Traub & I.S.Nelson

= Hippeastrum evansiae =

Species of flowering plant

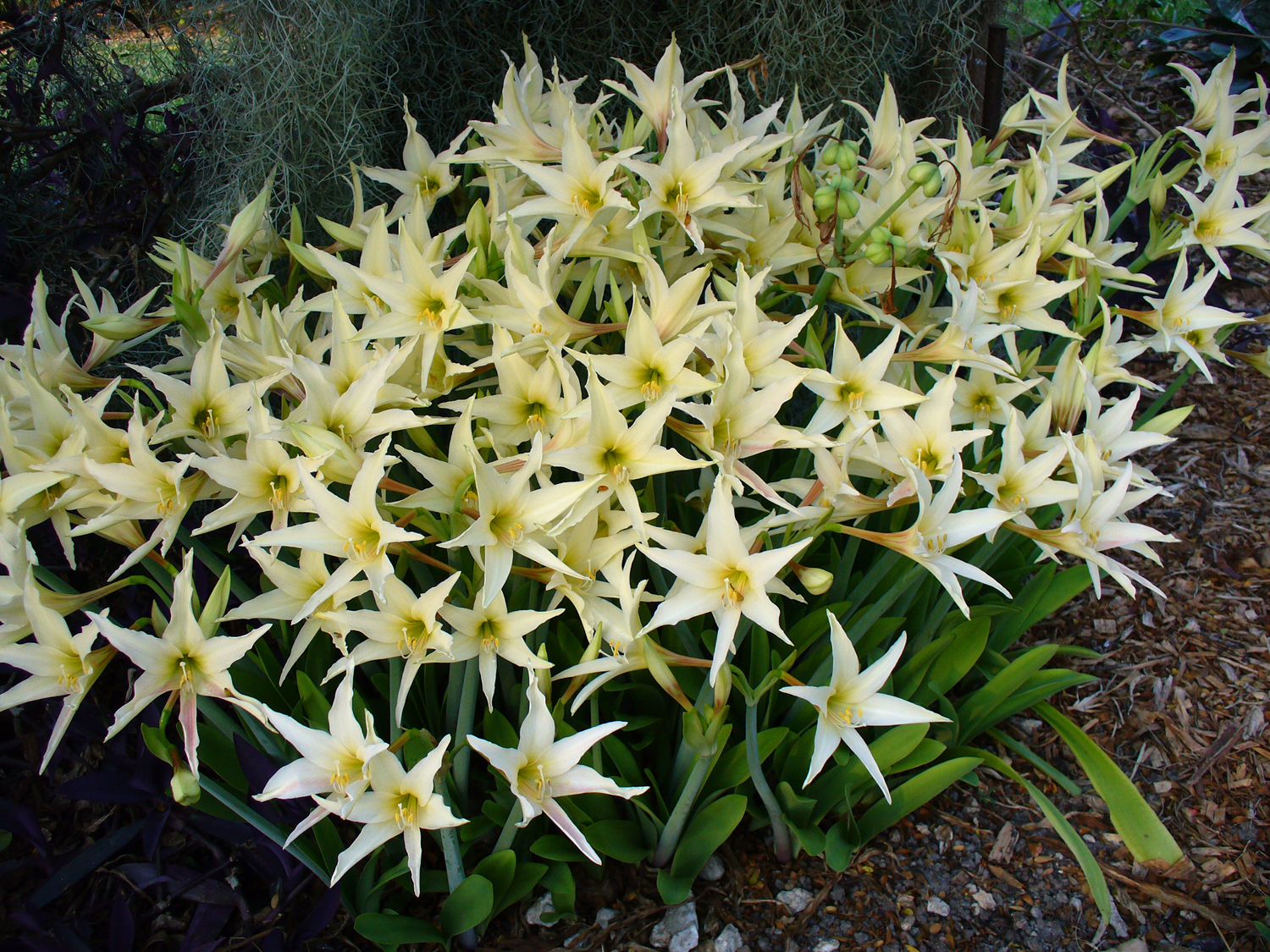

Hippeastrum evansiae is a flowering perennial herbaceous bulbous plant, in the family Amaryllidaceae, native to Bolivia.

== Description and habitat ==
Hippeastrum evansiae is rare because their natural habitat is being used for agriculture. Hippeastrum evansiae grows in hot dry forests and prefers a warm and dry winter. It is one of the smallest species in the genus Hippeastrum.

== Taxonomy ==
Described by Traub & I.S.Nelson in 1956, and the name formally accepted in 1963.

== Sources ==
- The Plant List (2012). "Hippeastrum evansiae".
- GBIF: Hippeastrum evansiae
