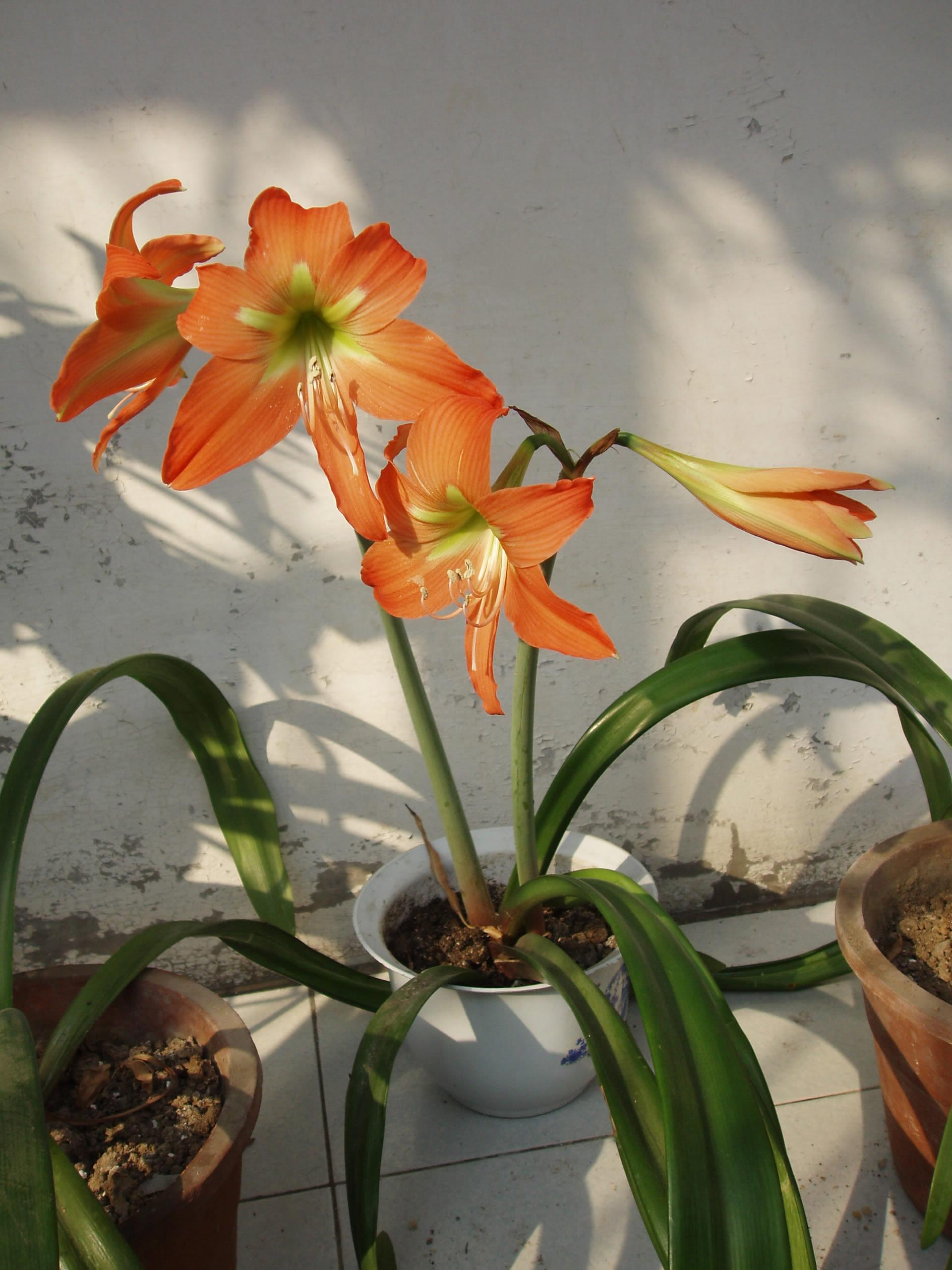

Scientific classification
- Kingdom: Plantae
- Clade: Tracheophytes
- Clade: Angiosperms
- Clade: Monocots
- Order: Asparagales
- Family: Amaryllidaceae
- Subfamily: Amaryllidoideae
- Genus: Hippeastrum
- Species: H. striatum

Binomial name
- Hippeastrum striatum (Lam.) H.E.Moore

Synonyms
- List: Amaryllis striata Lam.; Amaryllis acuminata Ker Gawl.; Amaryllis acuminata var. longipedunculata Lindl.; Amaryllis bahiensis A.DC.; Amaryllis bulbulosa (Herb.) Duch.; Amaryllis crocata Ker Gawl.; Amaryllis miniata Ker Gawl.; Amaryllis pulverulenta G.Lodd.; Amaryllis pulverulenta Gorrie; Amaryllis rutila Ker Gawl.; Amaryllis rutilans Lodd. ex Steud.; Amaryllis striata var. acuminata (Ker Gawl.) Traub & Moldenke; Amaryllis striata var. crocata (Ker Gawl.) Traub & Moldenke; Amaryllis subbarbata (Herb.) Sweet; Callicore crocata (Ker Gawl.) Link; Callicore rutila (Ker Gawl.) Link; Hippeastrum acuminatum (Ker Gawl.) M.Roem.; Hippeastrum bahiense (DC.) M.Roem.; Hippeastrum brasiliense M.Roem.; Hippeastrum bulbulosum Herb.; Hippeastrum bulbulosum var. acuminatum (Ker Gawl.) Herb.; Hippeastrum bulbulosum var. crocatum (Ker Gawl.) Herb.; Hippeastrum bulbulosum var. equestriforme Herb.; Hippeastrum bulbulosum var. ignescens Herb.; Hippeastrum bulbulosum var. pallidum Herb.; Hippeastrum bulbulosum var. pulverulentum (G.Lodd.) Herb.; Hippeastrum bulbulosum var. rutilum (Ker Gawl.) Herb.; Hippeastrum bulbulosum var. simsianum Herb.; Hippeastrum bulbulosum var. subbarbatum (Herb.) Herb.; Hippeastrum crocatum (Ker Gawl.) Herb.; Hippeastrum fulgidum var. miniatum Herb.; Hippeastrum latifolium M.Roem.; Hippeastrum martianum M.Roem.; Hippeastrum proliferum Herb.; Hippeastrum pulverulentum Herb.; Hippeastrum rutilum (Ker Gawl.) Herb.; Hippeastrum rutilum var. acuminatum (Ker Gawl.) Voss; Hippeastrum rutilum var. citrinum Baker; Hippeastrum rutilum var. crocatum (Ker Gawl.) Voss; Hippeastrum rutilum var. fulgidum Sprenger; Hippeastrum simsianum Herb.; Hippeastrum subbarbatum Herb.; Hippeastrum unguiculatum M.Roem.; Lais crocata (Ker Gawl.) Salisb.

= Hippeastrum striatum =

Species of flowering plant

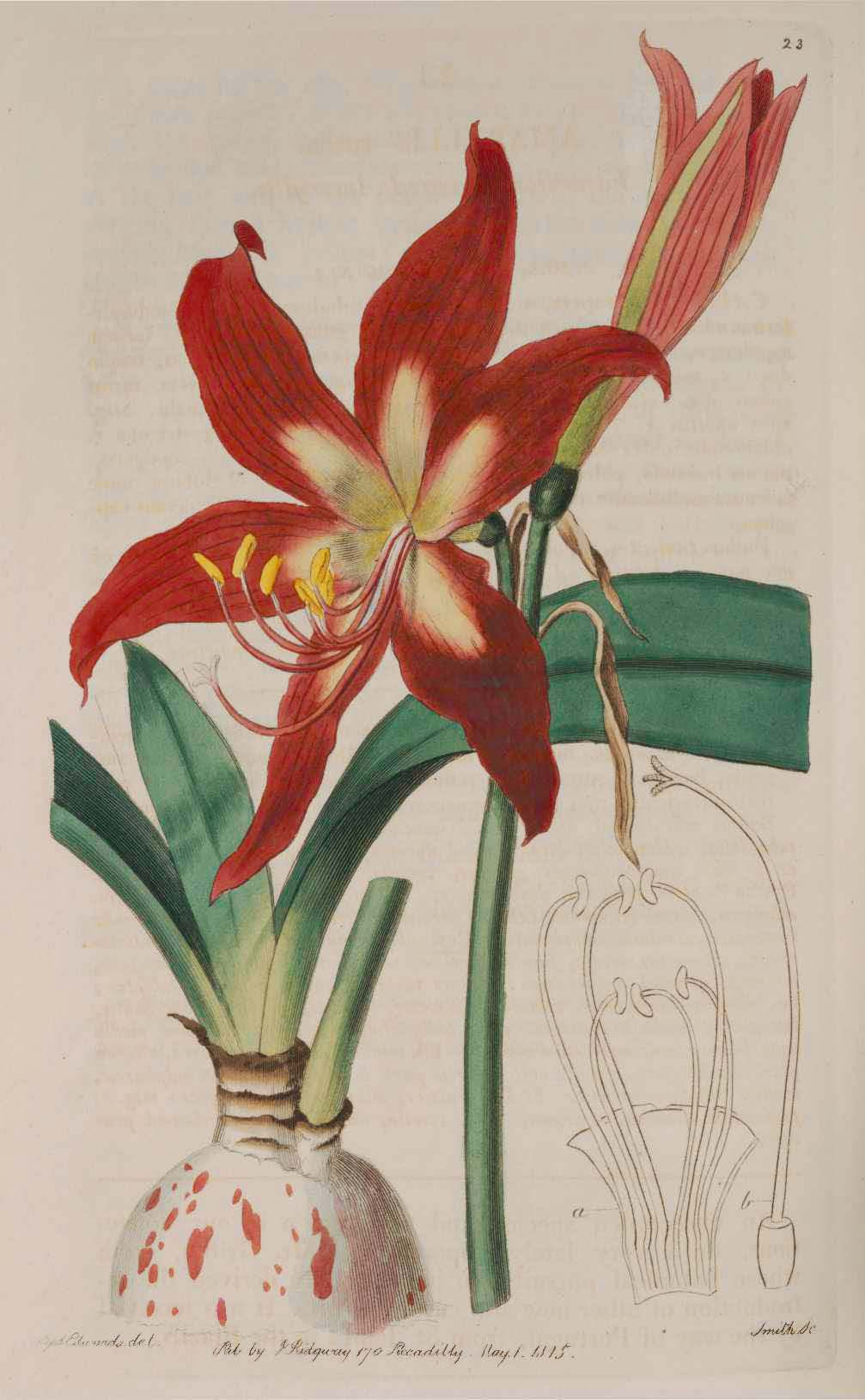
Hippeastrum striatum, Botanical Register 1815

Hippeastrum striatum, the striped Barbados lily, a flowering perennial herbaceous bulbous plant, in the family Amaryllidaceae, native to the southern and eastern regions of Brazil.

== Description ==
The flowers, generally 2–4, are smaller than other members of the genus. The paraperigon features bristles at the throat of the tepal tube. The perigone is about 7.6–10 cm in size and the tepal segments are 2–2.5 cm broad in their middle. Their colour is a bright red with a green keel that extends halfway up the segment. The stigma is trifid.

== Taxonomy ==
It was first described as Amaryllis striata Lam. by Jean-Baptiste Lamarck in 1783. Later it was included in the genus Hippeastrum Herb. as Hippeastrum striatum (Lam.) H.E.Moore published by Harold Emery Moore in 1963.

== Etymology ==
The name is derived from the Latin word striatus (striped).

== Distribution ==
It is native to Northeast, South, and Southeast Brazil. It has been introduced to Caroline Islands and Hawaii.

== Ecology ==
Produces numerous bulbils that facilitate its escape and naturalisation in tropical areas. It will grow from seeds in about two years.

== Bibliography ==
- "Pacific Bulb Society Wiki". Pacific Bulb Society. 2014.
- "Tropicos". Missouri Botanical Garden. 2015.
- Zuloaga, Fernando O.; Morrone, Osvaldo; Belgrano, Manuel J., eds. (2008). "Hippeastrum". Catálogo de las plantas vasculares del Cono Sur: (Argentina, Sur de Brasil, Chile, Paraguay y Uruguay) (Monogr. Syst. Bot. Missouri Bot. Gard. 107). St. Louis, Mo.: Missouri Botanical Garden. ISBN 978-1-930723-70-2.
- "World Checklist of Selected Plant Families". Royal Botanic Gardens, Kew.
- Griffith, Chuck (2005). "Dictionary of Botanical Epithets".
- The Plant List (2013). "The Plant List Version 1.1". Royal Botanic Gardens, Kew and Missouri Botanical Garden.
- Forzza, R. C. et al. 2010. 2010 Lista de espécies Flora do Brasil. Archived 2010-05-26 at the Wayback Machine
