= Hippeastrum arboricola =

Scientific classification
- Kingdom: Plantae
- Clade: Tracheophytes
- Clade: Angiosperms
- Clade: Monocots
- Order: Asparagales
- Family: Amaryllidaceae
- Subfamily: Amaryllidoideae
- Genus: Hippeastrum
- Species: H. arboricola

Binomial name
- Hippeastrum arboricola (Ravenna) Meerow, 1997

Synonyms
- Amaryllis arboricola Ravenna

Species of flowering plant

Hippeastrum arboricola is a flowering herbaceous bulbous plant in the family Amaryllidaceae, found in Argentina.

== Taxonomy ==
Described by Meerow in 1974.

== Sources ==
- The Plant List (2010). "Hippeastrum arboricola".
