= Hippeastrum leopoldii =

Scientific classification
- Kingdom: Plantae
- Clade: Tracheophytes
- Clade: Angiosperms
- Clade: Monocots
- Order: Asparagales
- Family: Amaryllidaceae
- Subfamily: Amaryllidoideae
- Genus: Hippeastrum
- Species: H. leopoldii

Binomial name
- Hippeastrum leopoldii T.Moore

Synonyms
- Heterotypic Synonyms: Amaryllis leopoldii H.J.Veitch ex T.Moore

Species of flowering plant

Hippeastrum leopoldii is a species of flowering plant in the family Amaryllidaceae. It is a perennial, herbaceous, bulbous plant, native to Bolivia and Peru.

== Taxonomy ==
It was first formally described by Thomas Moore in 1870.

=== Etymology ===
Named in honour of King Leopold II of Belgium, upon his visit to the Royal Horticultural Society exhibition in South Kensington in 1870.

== Cultivation ==
H. leopoldii has played an important part in Hippeastrum breeding programs, resulting in the so-called Leopoldii hybrids, the most important of which was 'John Heal'.
