= Margot Williams (botanist) =

American botanist

- Scientific career
- Fields: Botany
- Institutions: US National Arboretum
- Author abbrev. (botany): M.Williams

Margot Williams is an American botanist who described Hippeastrum iguazuanum in 1984.

== Career ==
Williams has a master's degree in horticulture and botany, and worked as a horticulturalist and research botanist at the U.S. National Arboretum, where among other activities she worked on Iris breeding.

== Publications ==
- Williams, Margot 1982. Chromosome Counts for Six Amaryllis Taxa. Plant Life 38: 34–39. [Corrigenda 39: 41(1983)]
- Williams, Margot 1982. A Tetraploid Amaryllis starkii. Plant Life 38: 59-61
- W. L. Ackerman and Margot Williams. New Cold Hardy Camellia Hybrid Selections. American Camellia Yearbook 1981

== Sources ==
- Harvard Botanist Index: Margot Williams
- The Americanization of Japanese iris: at the National Arboretum, breeders strive for longer-lasting blooms in a rainbow of colors. Horticulture, v61, 1983 Feb, p22(4) (ISSN 0018-5329)
