= Hippeastrum canterai =

Scientific classification
- Kingdom: Plantae
- Clade: Tracheophytes
- Clade: Angiosperms
- Clade: Monocots
- Order: Asparagales
- Family: Amaryllidaceae
- Subfamily: Amaryllidoideae
- Genus: Hippeastrum
- Species: H. canterai

Binomial name
- Hippeastrum canterai Arechav.

Synonyms
- Amaryllis canterai (Arechav.) Traub & Uphof

Species of flowering plant

Hippeastrum canterai is a flowering perennial herbaceous bulbous plant, in the family Amaryllidaceae, native to Uruguay.

== Taxonomy ==
Described by José Arechavaleta in 1899.

== Sources ==
- The Plant List (2012). "Hippeastrum canterai".
- GBIF: Hippeastrum canterai
