= William Herbert (botanist) =

British botanist, botanical illustrator, poet, and clergyman (1778–1847)

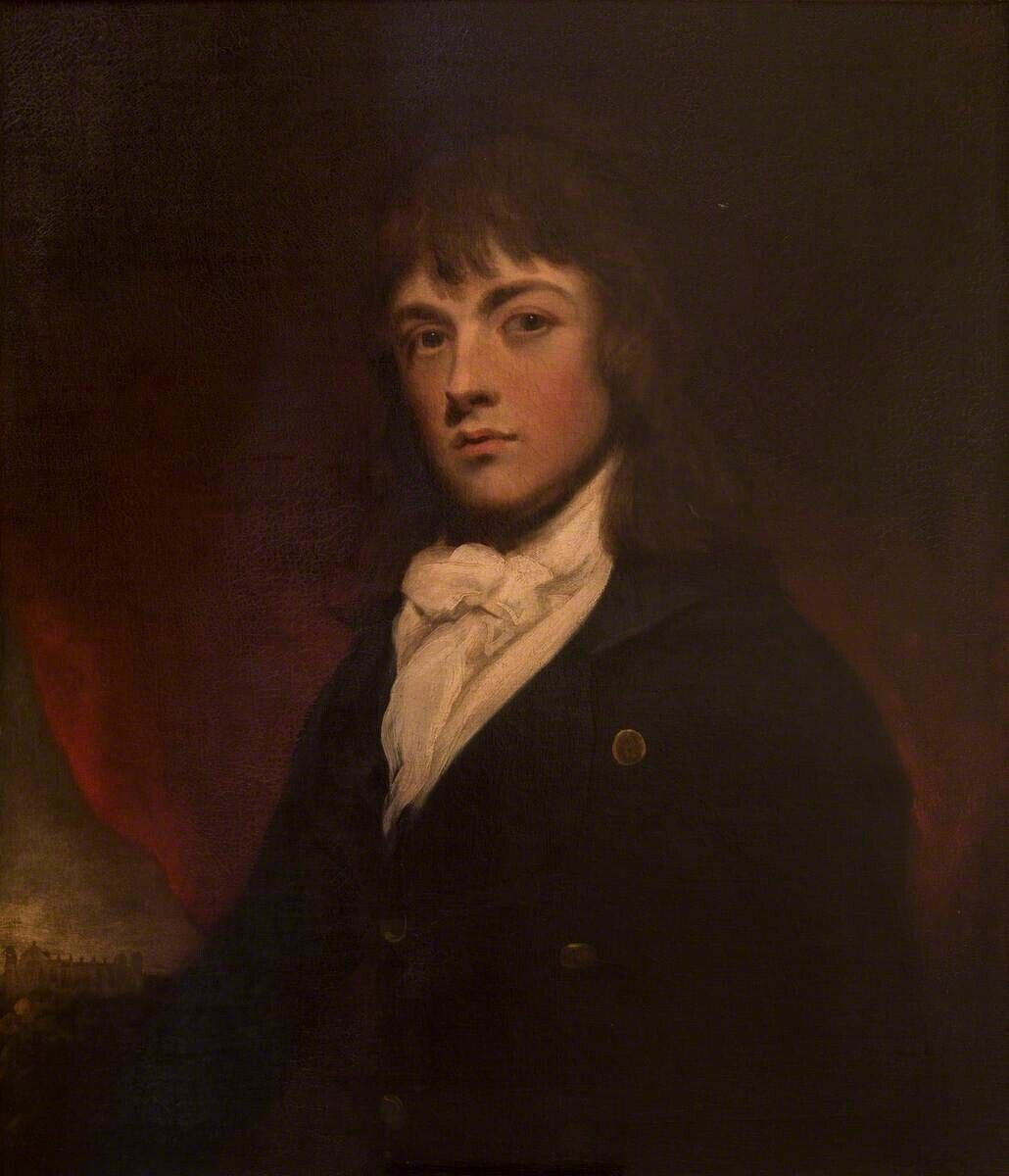
- Born: 12 January 1778
- Died: 28 May 1847 (aged 69); London
- Education: Eton College
- Alma mater: Christ Church; Exeter College; Merton College
- Known for: Early taxonomy of bulbous plants
- Political party: Tory
- Spouse: Hon. Letitia Emily Dorothea (m. 1806)
- Parents: Henry Herbert, 1st Earl of Carnarvon (father); Elizabeth Wyndham (mother)
- Relatives: Henry Herbert, 2nd Earl of Carnarvon (brother); Algernon Herbert (brother); Henry William Herbert (son); Henry Herbert, 3rd Earl of Carnarvon (nephew)
- Scientific career
- Fields: Botany
- Author abbrev. (botany): Herb.

Member of Parliament for Hampshire
- In office 1806–1807 Serving with Thomas Thistlethwayte
- Preceded by: Sir William Heathcote, Bt; William John Chute
- Succeeded by: Sir Henry St John-Mildmay; William John Chute

Member of Parliament for Cricklade
- In office 1811–1812 Serving with Thomas Goddard
- Preceded by: Henry Herbert
- Succeeded by: Joseph Pitt; Thomas Calley

The Hon. William Herbert (12 January 1778 – 28 May 1847) was a British botanist, botanical illustrator, poet, and clergyman. He served as a member of parliament for Hampshire from 1806 to 1807, and for Cricklade from 1811 to 1812. His botanical writings are noted for his treatment of Amaryllidaceae. He was also the first Dean of Manchester.

== Life ==
He was the third son and fifth child of Henry Herbert, 1st Earl of Carnarvon, by Lady Elizabeth Alicia Maria, eldest daughter of Charles Wyndham, 2nd Earl of Egremont. He was born on 12 January 1778, and was educated at Eton College. On 16 July 1795 Herbert matriculated at Christ Church, Oxford, but soon migrated to Exeter College, where he graduated B.A. on 6 June 1798. Subsequently, moving to Merton College, he proceeded M.A. 23 November 1802, B.C.L. 27 May 1808, D.C.L. 2 June 1808, and B.D. 25 June 1840. In a political career, he was elected M.P. for Hampshire in 1806, and for Cricklade in 1811, and also seems to have practised at the bar. But soon after retiring from parliament in 1812 he changed his plans. In 1814 he was ordained, and was nominated to the rectory of Spofforth in the West Riding of Yorkshire. He left Spofforth in 1840 on his promotion to Dean of Manchester.

Herbert died suddenly at his house in Hereford Street, Park Lane, London, on Friday, 28 May 1847.

== Works ==
In 1801 he brought out Ossiani Darthula, a small volume of Greek and Latin poetry. In 1804 appeared part i. of his Select Icelandic Poetry, translated from the originals with notes. Part ii. followed in 1806. These were early works on old Scandinavian literature in English. Lord Byron mentioned Herbert in his English Bards and Scotch Reviewers (1809). Other translations were from German, Danish, and Portuguese poems, with some miscellaneous English poems (1804).

He contributed articles of a non-political character to the Edinburgh Review. Helga, a poem in seven cantos, came out in 1815, with a second edition in the following year; then Hedin, or the Spectre of the Tomb, a tale in verse from Danish history. London, 1820; Pia della Pietra, 1820; Iris, a Latin ode, York, 1820; and the Wizard Wanderer of Jutland in 1820–1. The epic poem entitled Attila, or the Triumph of Christianity, in twelve books, with a historical preface, was published in 1838; and a final volume of poems, The Christian, in 1846.

Early interested in natural history, and a good shot, he helped James Rennie to edit Gilbert White's The Natural History and Antiquities of Selborne in 1833, and contributed notes to Edward Turner Bennett's edition of the work in 1837. He wrote much for the Botanical Register and Botanical Magazine, particularly on the subject of bulbous plants. He cultivated a large number of these plants at Spofforth, and at Mitcham, Surrey; many of these were lost to cultivation. His standard volume on this group of plants, Amaryllidaceæ, was issued in 1837. His Crocorum Synopsis appeared in the miscellaneous portion of the Botanical Register for 1843-4-5. Contributions on hybridisation made by him to the Journal of the Horticultural Society were the outcome of observation and experiment. A History of the Species of Crocus was reprinted separately from that journal, edited by John Lindley in 1847, just after his death. The genus Herbertia of Sweet commemorated his name.

His major works, including sermons, reviews, and scientific memoirs, besides his early poetical volumes, appeared in 2 volumes in 1842. He edited Musae Etonensis (1795) while still at school and, on quitting Eton, obtained a prize for a Latin poem on the subject Rhenus, which was published. A translation appeared in Translations of Oxford Prize Poems, 1831.

=== List of selected publications ===
- Herbert, W. (1819). "Amaryllis reticulata". Curtis's Botanical Magazine. 47: 2113.
- Herbert, W. (4 April 1820). "On the culture of the Guernsey Lily, and other bulbs of the genera Nerine, Coburgia and Brunsvigia, heretofore united under Amaryllis". Trans. Hortic. Soc. Lond. 4: 176–184.
- Herbert, William (1821). "An Appendix: Preliminary Treatise (pp. 1–14) and A Treatise &c. (pp. 15–52)". The Botanical Register. 7. Piccadilly, London: James Ridgway and Sherwood, Neely, and Sons.
- Herbert, William (1837). Amaryllidaceae: Preceded by an Attempt to Arrange the Monocotyledonous Orders, and Followed by a Treatise on Cross-bred Vegetables, and Supplement. London: Ridgway.
- Herbert, William (1847). "A History of the Species of Crocus". The Journal of the Horticultural Society of London. 2: 249–293.

== Recognition ==
The International Bulb Society awards The Herbert Medal to persons making meritorious achievement in advancing the knowledge of bulbous plants.

== Family ==
Herbert married the Hon. Letitia Emily Dorothea, second daughter of Joshua Allen, 5th Viscount Allen, on 17 May 1806, and was father of Henry William Herbert and three other children.

== Commentary on Herbert ==
Charles Darwin wrote in On the Origin of Species (1859):

Natural Selection, as we shall hereafter see, is a power incessantly ready for action, and is as immeasurably superior to man's feeble efforts, as the works of Nature are to those of Art. ...The elder De Candolle and Lyell have largely and philosophically shown that all organic beings are exposed to severe competition. In regard to plants, no one has treated this subject with more spirit and ability than W. Herbert, Dean of Manchester, evidently the result of his great horticultural knowledge.

Andrew Dickson White wrote in A History of the Warfare of Science with Theology in Christendom (1896):

About 1820 Dean Herbert, eminent as an authority in horticulture, avowed his conviction that species are but fixed varieties.

Science historian Conway Zirkle has written that Herbert had recognized the struggle for existence. According to Zirkle "he approached very closely to the natural selection hypothesis when he suggested that winter hardiness might become established in a hybrid stock through the survival of chance variations."

== Bibliography ==
- Stearn, William T. (November 1952). "William Herbert's "Appendix" and "Amaryllidaceae"". Journal of the Society for the Bibliography of Natural History. 2 (9): 375–377. doi:10.3366/jsbnh.1952.2.9.375.
- Herbert, William (1842). Works of the Hon. and Very Rev. William Herbert, Dean of Manchester, Etc. Excepting those on botany and natural history; with additions and corrections by the author. Vol. II. London: Bohn.
- Supplement to the Works of the Hon. and Very Rev. William Herbert, Dean of Manchester, Etc. London: H.G. Bohn. 1846.
- This article incorporates text from a publication now in the public domain: Jackson, Benjamin Daydon (1885–1900). "Herbert, William (1778-1847)". Dictionary of National Biography. London: Smith, Elder & Co.
- Leigh Rayment's Historical List of MPs
