= Traub =

Traub is a German surname. Notable people with the surname include:

- Barbara Traub, American photographer
- Charles H. Traub (born 1945), American photographer and educator
- Daniel Traub (born 1971), American photographer and filmmaker
- David S. Traub (born 1941), American architect, author and playwright
- Doug Traub (born 1958), American marketing executive who specialized in managing destination marketing organizations (DMOs)
- Erich Traub (1906–1985), German virologist
- Franziska Traub (1962), German actress
- Günter Traub (born 1939), German Olympic speed skater
- Hamilton Paul Traub (1890–1983), American botanist
- James Traub (born 1954), American journalist
- Joseph F. Traub (1932–2015), computer scientist
- Judy Traub (born 1940), American politician
- Marvin Traub (1925–2012), American businessman
- Paul Traub (born 1952), American lawyer
- Percy Traub (1896–1948), Canadian hockey player
- Peter E. Traub (1864–1956), American Army officer
- Peter M. Traub (born 1974), American composer of electronic and acoustic music and sound installations
- Rayme Traub (born 1983), American Aerospace and Electrical Engineer- NASA/SpaceX expert for life seeking missions
- Sabrina Frederick-Traub (born 1996), Australian rules footballer
- Sophie Traub (born 1989), Canadian actress
- Stefan Traub (born 1969), Swiss curler
- Wilhelm Traub (1910–1946), German Nazi SS-Obersturmbannführer
- Yaron Traub (born 1964), Israeli conductor and pianist

== See also ==
- Traube
