= Philly Painting =

Northern Philadelphian art group

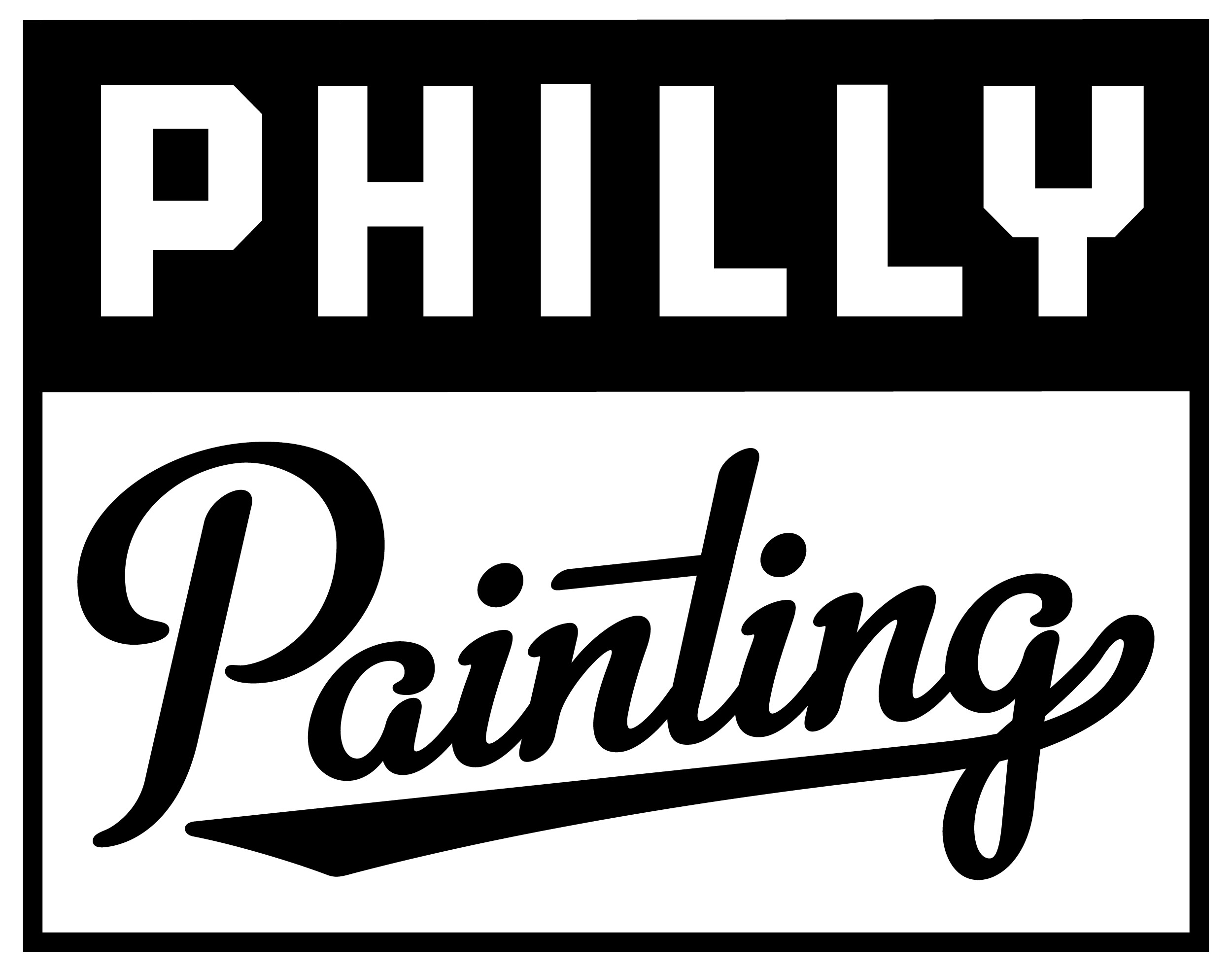
- Type of project: Community Artwork
- Location: North Philadelphia, USA
- Founder: Philadelphia Mural Arts Program
- Established: 2012
- Funding: See below
- Website: www.phillypainting.org

Philly Painting is a community-driven art project in North Philadelphia. The goal of the project is to create artwork in the town with the help of the local people. The project is organized by Philadelphia Mural Arts Program and spearheaded by the Dutch artist duo Haas&Hahn. As the first phase of Philly Painting project, Haas&Hahn hired and trained a group of people to paint 50 storefront buildings on Germantown Avenue, east of Broad Street in North Philadelphia in 2012.

== Background ==
Haas&Hahn worked from 2007 to 2010 in Rio de Janeiro under the Favela Painting project and painted murals over 7,000 square meters of public square in the Santa Marta called Praça Cantão. In 2008 and the years to follow Favela Painting gained considerable attention in the media - both local and international. Jane Golden of Mural Arts Program heard about the Favela Painting project and invited Haas&Hahn to carry out a similar project in Northern Philadelphia. In 2011, Mural Arts Program hired the duo. Haas&Hahn moved to Philadelphia’s Germantown the same year through a residency program and settled on the 2400 block of Alder Street, a few blocks away from the project location.

== Germantown Avenue Project ==
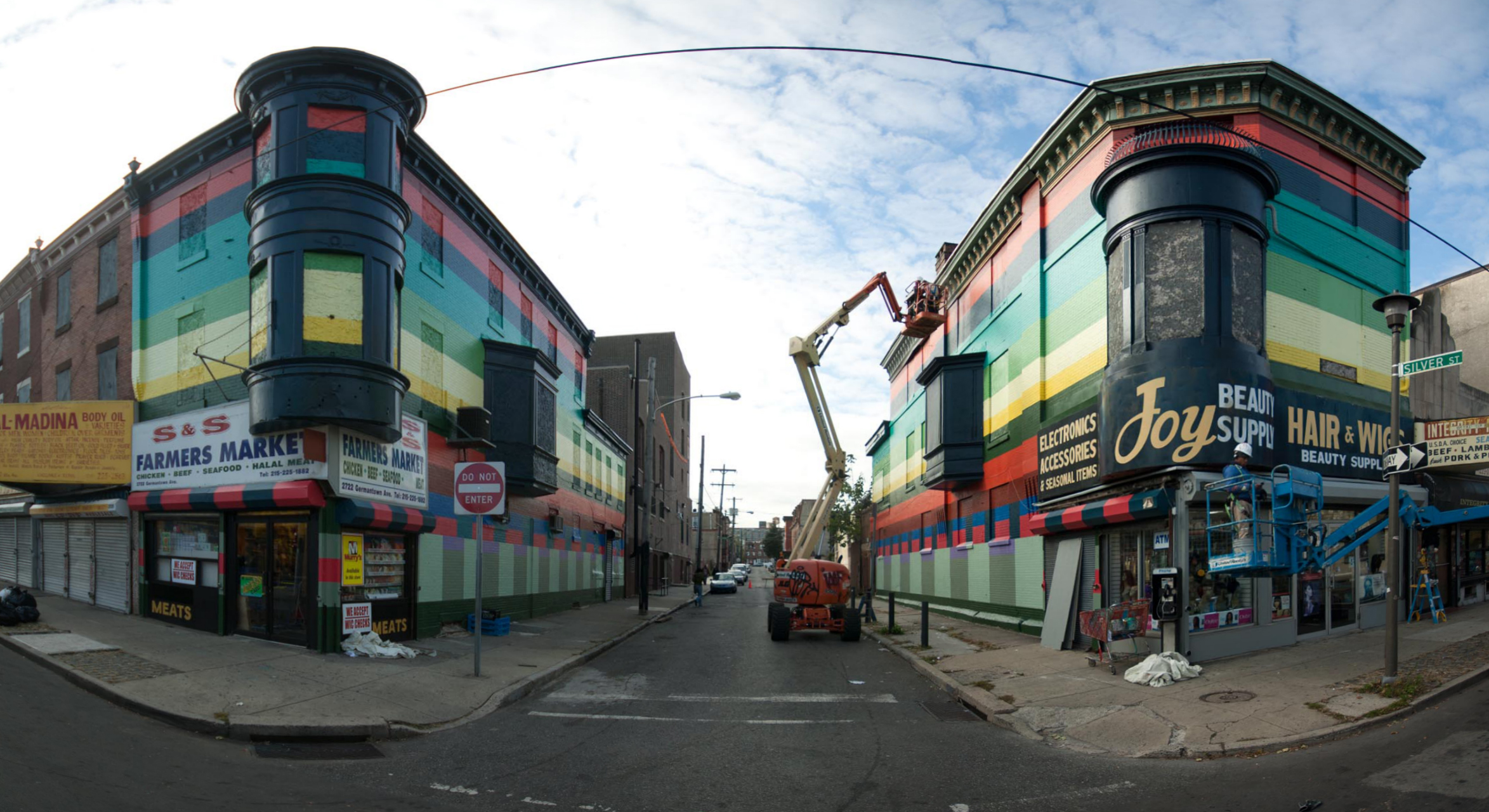
Germantown Avenue

The first phase of the Philly Project was set on a four-block stretch of Germantown Avenue between Huntingdon Street and Somerset, including the principal intersection at West Lehigh Avenue. It involved painting murals on 50 storefronts buildings between the 2500 and 2800 blocks of Germantown Avenue. This project is part of a $3.5 million makeover that city officials have planned for North Philadelphia. After moving to North Philadelphia, Haas&Hahn spent 8 months to hire and train people and contact with the store owners to bring them on board.

Haas&Hahn took pictures of buildings and streets throughout the neighborhood and from these images formed a palette with 50 options of colors to suit the city's colors. The palette was then presented to each of the landlords who selected the colors they wanted on their buildings. The duo also created a studio on the 2600 block of Germantown Avenue where residents came by to discuss their issues with the design. The studio was also used as a place for the duo and their painting team to rest while they worked in the day. The work started in late April 2012 and was completed in November the same year. One thousand gallons of paint was used in the project.

=== Funding and Support ===
Philly Painting was awarded a $100,000 grant through the John S. and James L. Knight Foundation Grant, an award which is part of a larger $2.7 million grant funding 36 projects throughout the city. The City’s Department of Commerce, Bank of America, and The Village of Arts and Humanities also provided funding for Philly Painting. The Village of Arts and Humanities provided residence for Haas&Hahn as well.

Other entities that supported the project include Philadelphia Planning Commission, Interface Studio and NET Neighborhood Enrichment and Transformation CDC.

=== Merchandise ===
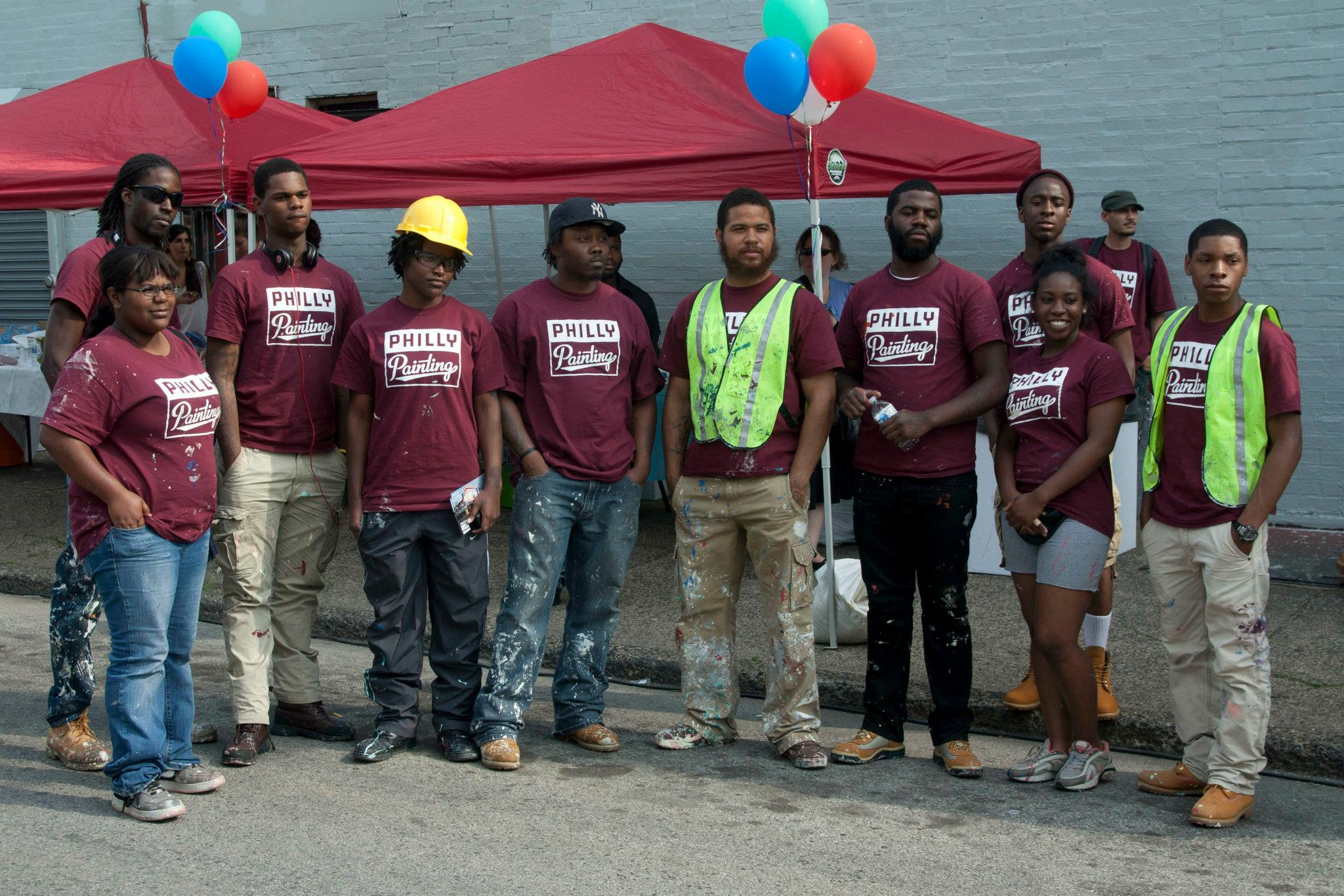
Crew wearing Philly Painting T-shirts

The artists designed and printed T-shirts for Philly Painting project with the help of Germantown Avenue merchants. The idea of team T-shirts originated when the Haas&Hahn were working in Rio de Janeiro under Favela Painting project. Urhahn said the uniforms were a means of self-preservation because the painters were getting shot while in Rio. The police in armored vehicles thought the painters had guns in their hands, when they were just holding brushes. To protect the painters, they designed T-shirts that said "pintor" (painter) on the front. Philly Painting T-shirts became popular in the area during and after the project. Other merchandise was also prepared with the help of local merchants.

HUB Footwear introduced a limited edition Philly Painting sneaker designed by Haas&Hahn. Only 400 sneakers were made in the label's trademark mid-height "half-top" in Philadelphia's signature color - burgundy. All profits of this limited edition sneaker were donated to Favela Painting Foundation, to support their future projects. The HUB Footwear x Philly Painting was available at selected HUB Footwear shops in February 2013.

== Response ==
Much like its sister project Favela Painting, the response to Philly Painting has been positive. When the work on the project started, Fred Bernstein of The New York Times wrote, "From the Barnes Foundation's new building in downtown Philadelphia, it's three miles to the 2600 block of Germantown Avenue, a shabby commercial strip that is turning out to be another stellar place to look at painting". Inga Saffron with The Philadelphia Inquirer wrote about the Philly Painting, "As a composition, there is much to admire about Haas & Hahn's luminously colored mural. It recalls the famous grid paintings by their 20th century compatriot, the Dutch artist Piet Mondrian, whose jazz-inspired work also celebrates the city. Their grid moves to a hip-hop beat, and that injects the appearance of energy into this anemic commercial corridor".

Commenting about the improvement brought in the neighborhood by Philly Painting project, Daryl 'Cornbread' Mcray said, “you can see the difference, and you can feel the difference.”

=== Book ===
Smyrski Creative, a Philadelphia-based design studio, worked with the artists to create a book which documents the process and outcome of this project. The Dutch photographer Iwan Baan provided a poster and cover photo for the book.

=== Documentaries ===
Filmmakers Jon Kaufman and El Sawyer made a documentary with Mural Arts Executive Director Jane Golden and Haas&Hahn in 2012. The documentary was a short film about behind the scenes of Philly Painting. HUB Footwear also made a documentary about this project and Haas&Hahn's work titled 'A Day in the Life of Haas&Hahn", which was released in September 2012. After the completion of the project HUB Footwear made another documentary about the project.

== See also ==
- Favela Painting
