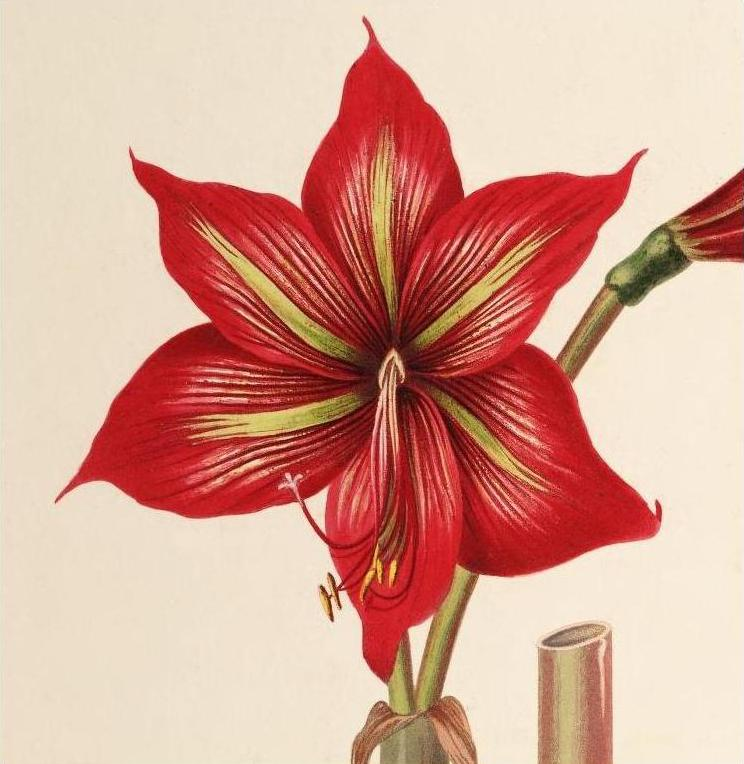

Scientific classification
- Kingdom: Plantae
- Clade: Tracheophytes
- Clade: Angiosperms
- Clade: Monocots
- Order: Asparagales
- Family: Amaryllidaceae
- Subfamily: Amaryllidoideae
- Genus: Hippeastrum
- Species: H. correiense

Binomial name
- Hippeastrum correiense (Bury) Worsley

Synonyms
- Amaryllis correiensis Bury

= Hippeastrum correiense =

Species of flowering plant

Hippeastrum correiense is a flowering perennial herbaceous bulbous plant, in the family Amaryllidaceae, native to Brazil.

== Description ==
Large bulbs and trumpet shaped flowers.

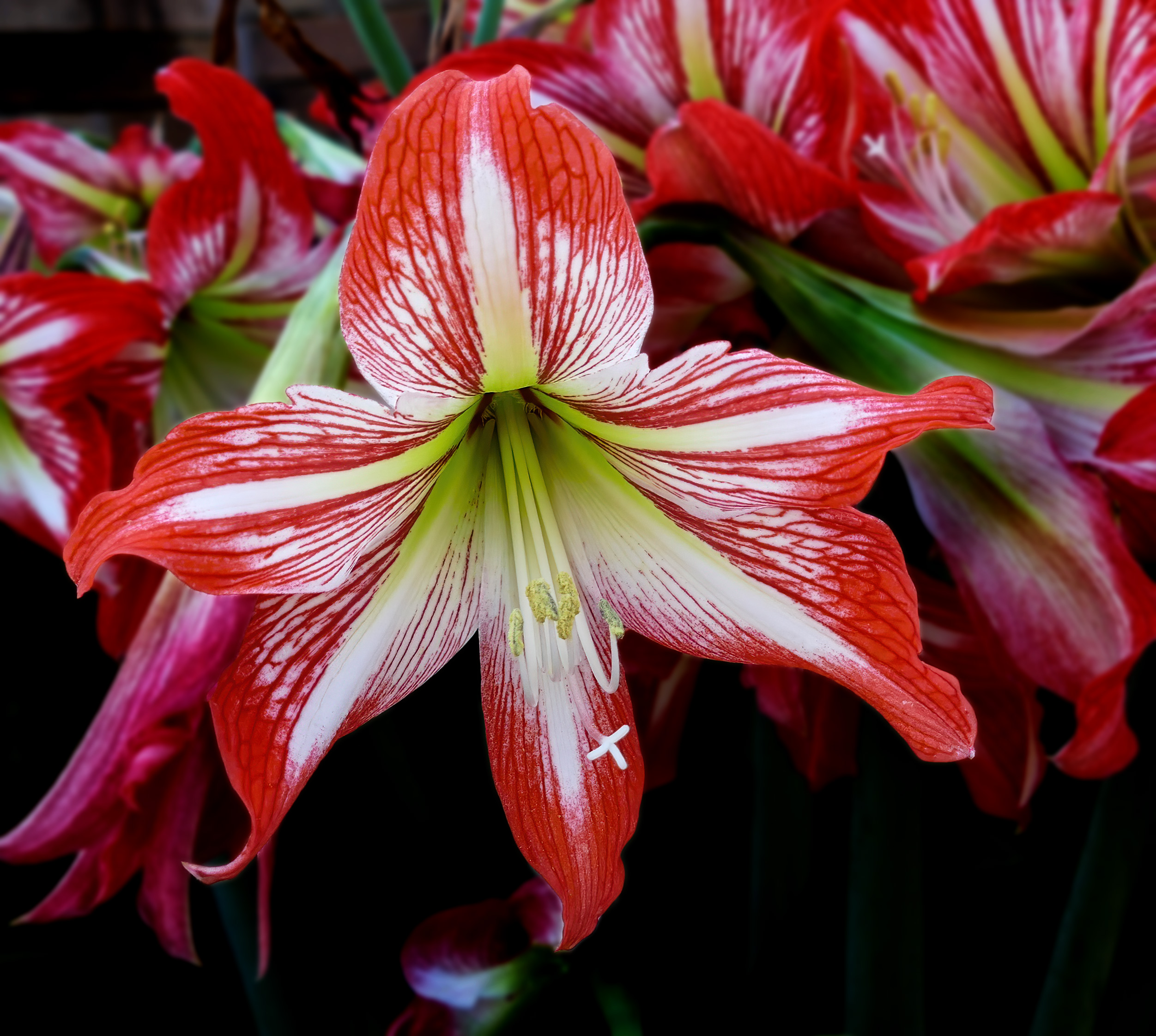
Hippeastrum correiense flowers

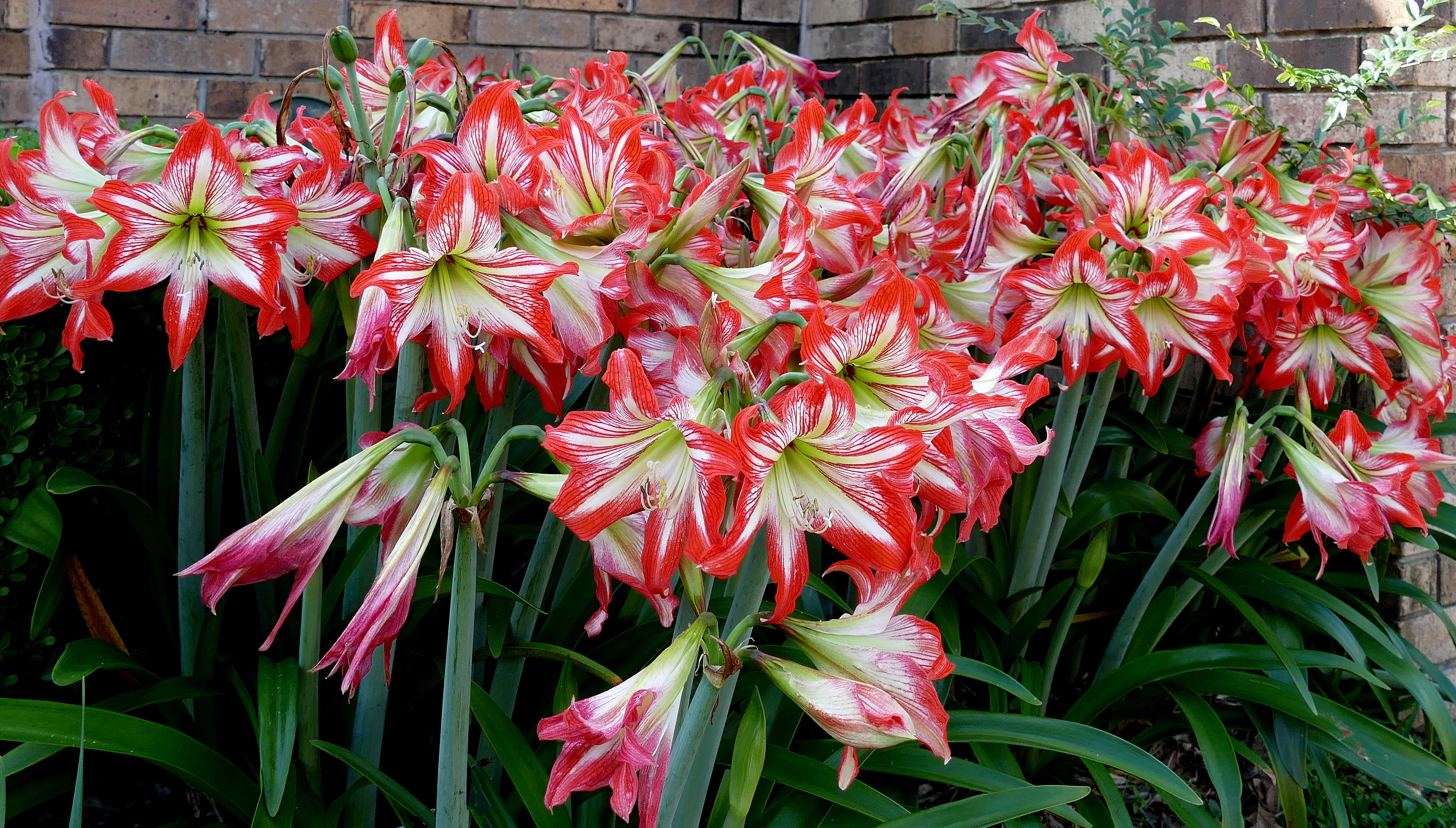
Hippeastrum correiense flowers

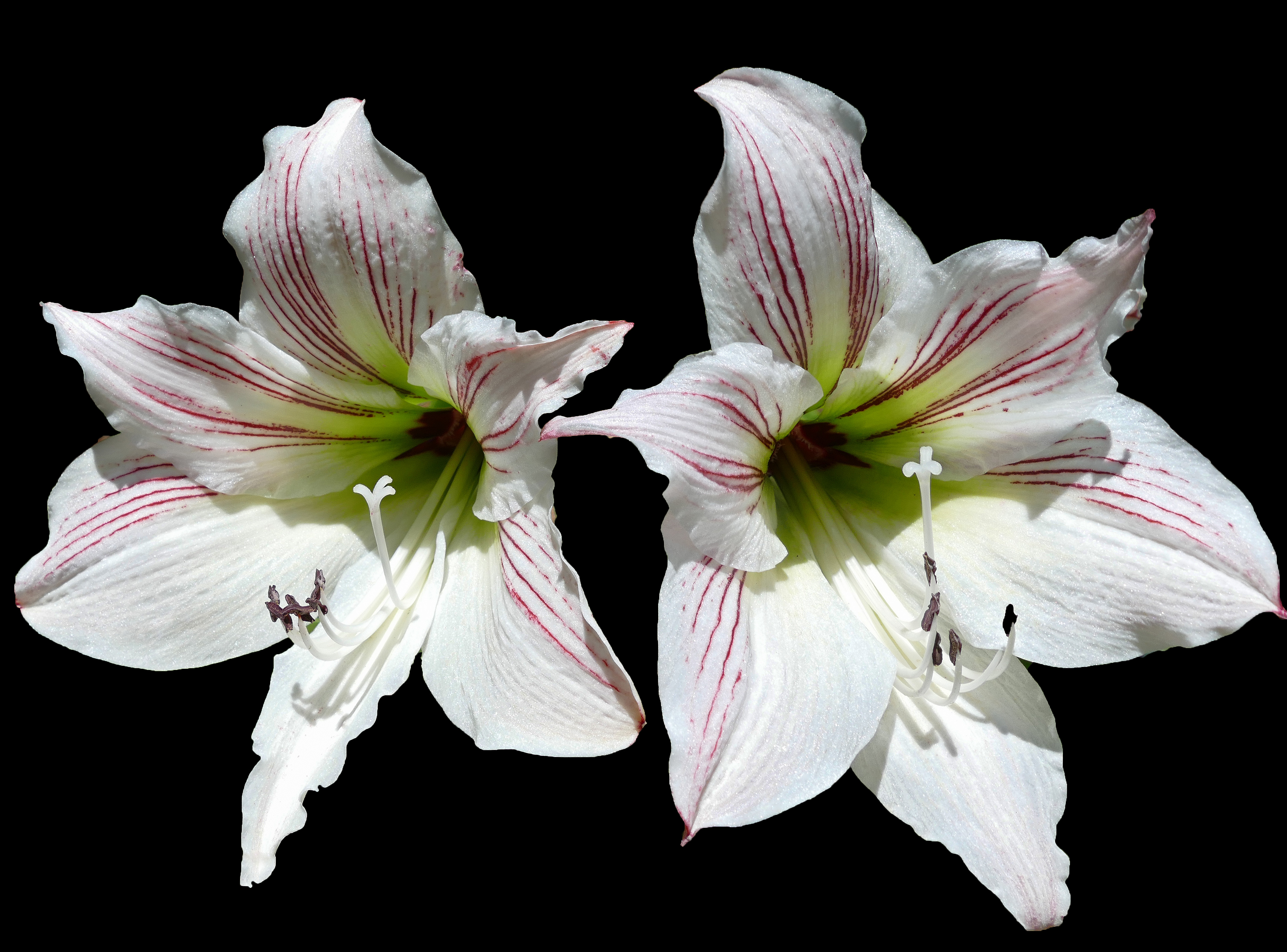
Hippeastrum correiense flowers

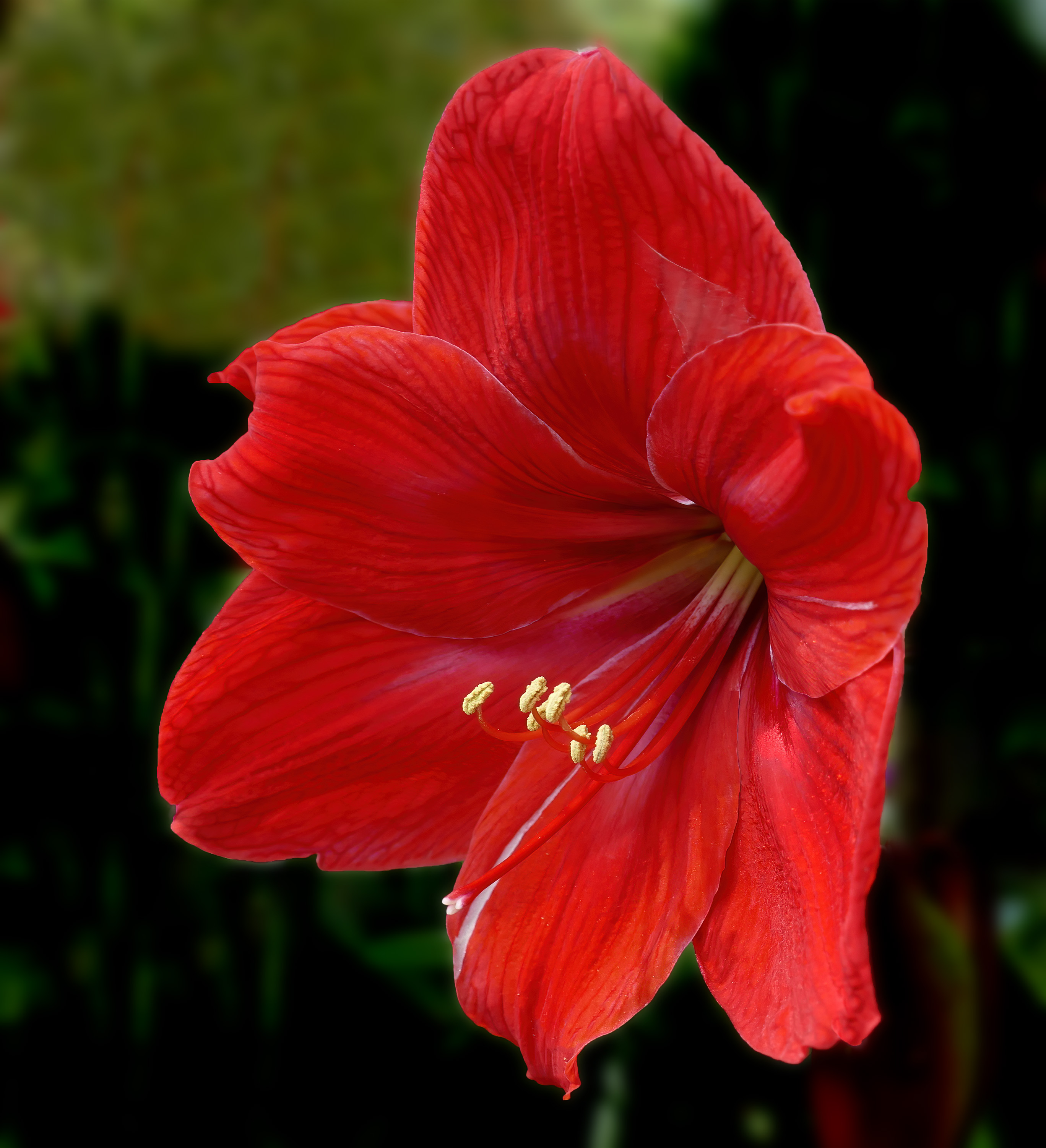
Hippeastrum correiense flowers

== Taxonomy ==
Described under its current name by Arthington Worsley in The Gardeners' Chronicle (ser. 3, 85: 377) in 1929.

Synonyms:

- Amaryllis correiensis Bury, Select. Hexandr. Pl.: 9 (1832). (Basionym)
- Amaryllis aulica var. glaucophylla Hook., Bot. Mag. 57: t. 2983 (1830).
- Hippeastrum aulicum var. glaucophyllum (Hook.) Herb., Amaryllidaceae: 136 (1837).
- Hippeastrum organense Herb., Bot. Mag. 67: t. 3803 (1840).
- Hippeastrum organense var. compressum Herb., Edwards's Bot. Reg. 28(Misc.): 39 (1842).
- Amaryllis gardneri Seub. in C.F.P.von Martius et auct. suc. (eds.), Fl. Bras. 3(1): 149 (1847).
- Hippeastrum gardneri (Seub.) Hoehne, Araucarilandia: 30 (1930).
- Amaryllis organensis (Herb.) Traub et Uphof, Herbertia 5: 129 (1938).
- Amaryllis organensis var. compressa (Herb.) Traub, Pl. Life 7: 35 (1951).

== Sources ==
- The Plant List (2012). "Hippeastrum correiense".
- GBIF: Hippeastrum correiense
- List of Species of the Brazilian Flora. Rio de Janeiro Botanical Garden (Search for Hippeastrum correiense)
