= Arthington Worsley =

British botanist, explorer and civil engineer

- Born: 9 December 1861; London
- Died: 13 January 1944 (aged 82); Middlesex
- Scientific career
- Fields: Botany
- Author abbrev. (botany): Worsley

Arthington Worsley (Marylebone, London 9 December 1861 – Middlesex, 13 January 1944) was a British botanist, explorer and civil engineer, who carried out extensive botanical expeditions in South America. He also played two first-class cricket matches for the Marylebone Cricket Club, playing once in 1888 and 1890 respectively.

== Awards ==
1937. Herbert medal.

== Eponyms ==
- (Amaryllidaceae) Worsleya (Traub) Traub 1944

== Publications ==
- Worsley, Arthington (1895), Notes on the Distribution of the Amaryllideae and of Certain Liliaceous, Irideous and Other Plants in Grand Canary, Cuba, Jamaica, and Venezuela: With an Enumberation of Species
- Worsley, Arthington (2012). The Genus Hippeastrum: A Monograph ... Nabu Press. ISBN 978-1-277-39963-9. originally published 1896
- 1907. Concepts of monism. Ed. London : T. Fisher Unwin. xv + 356 pp.

== Bibliography ==
- 1936. Life and career of Arthington Worsley : an autobiography. Herbertia 3 : 10–19
- "Author Details for Arthington Worsley" (HTML). International Plant Names Index. International Organization for Plant Information (IOPI).
- Harvard Botanist Index
- Erhardt, Walter; et al. (2008). Der große Zander. Enzyklopädie der Pflanzennamen. Stuttgart: Verlag Eugen Ulmer. ISBN 978-3-8001-5406-7.
