= Lily Yeh =

American artist (born 1941)

Lily Yeh( Chinese characters: 葉蕾蕾 )
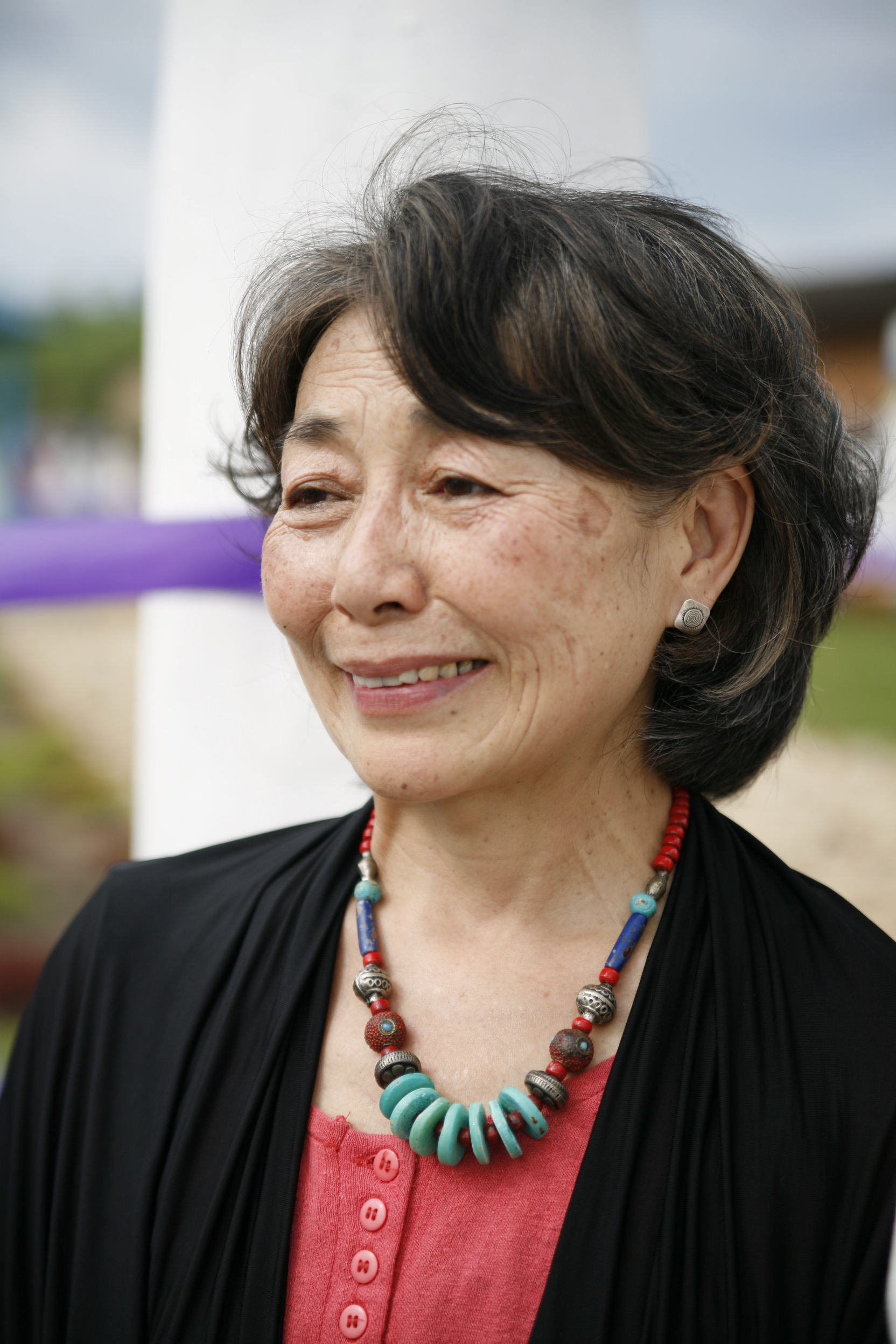
- Lily Yeh in 2013
- Born: 1941 (age 84–85); Guizhou, China
- Education: University of Pennsylvania School of Design; National Taiwan University
- Movement: Urban Alchimist
- Awards: Daughter of Greatness Award (2015); ATLAS Gold Medal of Honor (2010); Leadership for a Changing World Award, Ford Foundation (2003); Rudy Bruner Gold Medal Award (2001); Pew Fellowship in the Arts (1992)
- Website: barefootartists.org

Lily Yeh (born 1941, Guizhou, China) is an artist whose work has taken her to communities throughout the world. She grew up in Taiwan and moved to the United States in 1963 to attend the University of Pennsylvania Graduate School of Fine Arts. She was a professor of painting and art history at University of the Arts (Philadelphia) from 1968 until 1998. As founder and executive director of The Village of Arts and Humanities in North Philadelphia from 1986 to 2004, she helped create a national model in creative place-making and community building through the arts. In 2002, Yeh pursued her work internationally, founding Barefoot Artists, Inc. In addition to the United States, she has carried out projects in several other countries.

She is the subject of the feature-length documentary film The Barefoot Artist directed by Glenn Holsten and Daniel Traub. Yeh has been included in the Asian American Arts Centre's artasiamerica digital archive.

== Projects ==
=== The Village of Arts and Humanities ===
Lily Yeh co-founded The Village of Arts and Humanities in 1989. The project began as a simple park-building project in North Philadelphia in 1986 involving neighborhood children, and developed into a private, nonprofit, community-based organization dedicated to neighborhood revitalization through the arts. By 2004, the Village had become a professional organization with an annual budget of $1.3 million and a dedicated staff of sixteen full-time and ten part-time employees including a four-person construction crew. During the last decade of her sojourn, the organization has yearly served over thousands of low-income, primarily African-American youth and families, covering several neighborhoods within a 260 square block area in North Philadelphia and transformed more than 120 vacant lots into gardens and parks. They have also renovated vacant homes, creating art workshops, a youth theater and educational programs.

The Village received many national awards including the Coming Up Taller Award from the President's Committee on Arts and Humanities and the National Endowment for the Arts, Washington, D.C. in 2000 and the gold medal Rudy Bruner Award for Urban Excellence from the Bruner Foundation in Cambridge, MA in 2001. In 2003, the Village received a Commonwealth of Pennsylvania Governor's Award for Environmental Excellence. In 2007, The Village received the prestigious Champion in Action from Citizens Bank for its building community through the arts effort since 1986. In 2004, Yeh left the Village of Arts and Humanities to pursue other work internationally.

=== American Visionary Art Museum, Baltimore ===
In 2005, Yeh was invited as guest curator by the American Visionary Art Museum. She introduced and curated the wall-sized papercut pieces by the late Chinese folk artist Ku Shu-Lan in the exhibition Race, Class, Gender ≠ Character at AVAM. Rebecca Alban Hoffberger, Director and Founder of the Museum dedicated its 11th mega-exhibition to Lily Yeh because “her work so artfully and lovingly transcends race, class, nationality and gender.”

=== Ghana - Jamestown public square transformation project ===
Traveling to Accra, Ghana in 2002, Yeh collaborated with educator Heidi Owu and community leaders to carry out a land transformation project in an impoverished neighborhood in Jamestown, located in the old section of the capital city Accra. The project engaged hundreds of children and adults in transforming a bleak courtyard into a public space full of patterns and colors.

=== Barefoot Artists ===
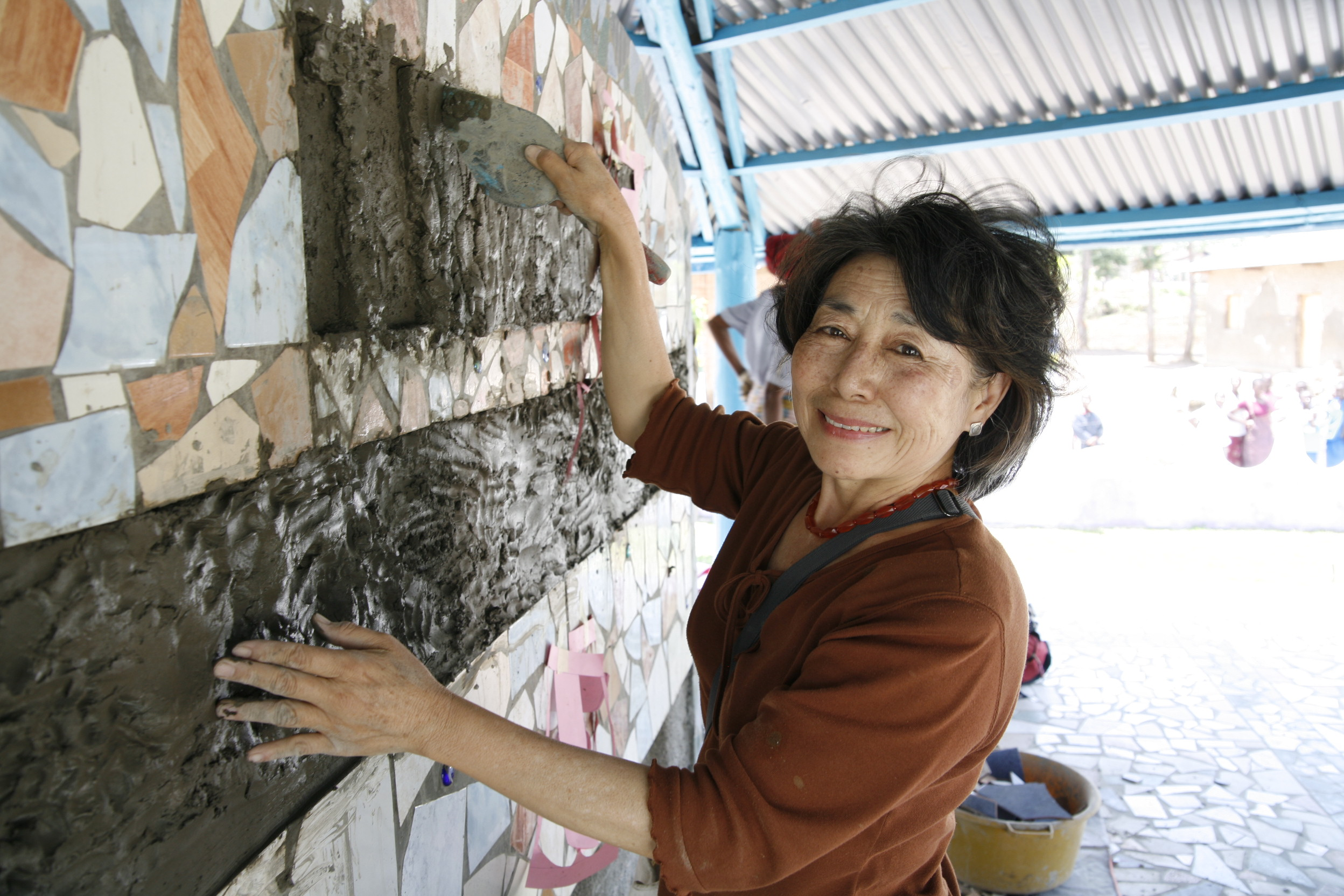
Lily Yeh at Barefoot Artists

In 2003, Lily Yeh founded the non-profit organization Barefoot Artists Inc. Using the same concept and model used in Philadelphia, the Barefoot Artists work to train and empower local residents, organize communities, and take action to use the power of art to transform impoverished communities. Recently, Yeh has worked on projects in ten countries including Rwanda, Kenya, Ecuador, and China. She discusses her work at the Dandelion School in Beijing, China in her book Awakening Creativity (New Village Press, 2010).

=== The Rwanda Healing Project - Rugerero Genocide Memorial ===
As a part of the Barefoot Artists Inc, Lily Yeh founded the Rwanda Healing Project. This project is working with children, using art in communities to bring peace in villages that have experienced the genocide and civil war. She designed the Rugerero Genocide Memorial Monument Park in 2004 and it was built in 2005 with help from hundreds of local villagers.

=== Taiwan, Awakening Creativity Project, An Kang ===
Located on the outskirts of Taipei, the An Kang neighborhood has deteriorated due to the concentration of low-income residents. In 2013, Lily Yeh led a three-day workshop for children and adults living in An Kang public housing in a poor and neglected area to imagine and create together their re-developed community through story-sharing and art. The result was presented to the Urban Redevelopment Department of Taiwan University which oversaw the An Kang redevelopment project for the city of Taipei.

=== The Dzegvi Children's Project, Tbilisi ===
Collaborating with filmmaker Glenn Holsten and photographer Daniel Traub, Yeh traveled in 1999 to Dzegvi, a little village nearby Tbilisi containing twenty families and 110 street children, to conduct workshops with children in drawing, painting and photography. Children and several family groups took photos of each other, their activities and environment. At the end of the project, an exhibition of 15 big, life size banners of individual and group figures and hundreds of the photographs were exhibited at Dzegvi. The project also produced a 12-minute film describing the Dzegvi community through the eyes of one particular family.

=== Görlitz, Germany ===
In 2016, Lily Yeh and the Barefoot Artists were invited to Görlitz by a group of local artists under the auspices of "Bohemian Crossings". Located in East Germany, Görlitz and its people have also known many hardships, most recently under communist-rule. High unemployment, dwindling populations and rows of abandoned or decaying buildings speak to the forced obliteration of history and loss of identity which they experienced. The Barefoot Artists work together with the international artists to bring the memory and the cultural heritage back to the people.

== Publications by Lily Yeh ==
- Community Building Through Art and Youth Participation, Humanistic Educational Journal 11, Taiwan, 2005.
- Barefoot Artists: Healing the World, One Artist at a Time, Designer/builder, A Journal of the Human Environment, Nov./Dec. 2006.
- Ige, Barbara K.; Ochoa, Maria, eds. (28 December 2007). "My Story". Shout Out, Women of Color Respond to Violence. Basic Books. ISBN 9781580052290.
- How Art Can Heal Broken Places, Moonrise: The Power Of Women Leading From The Heart, Nina Simon, ed., 2011.
- Painting Hope in the World, in "Dream of a Nation" (A Vision for a Better America), edited by Tyson Miller, 2011.
- Awakening Creativity, Dandelion School Blossoms, New Village Press, 2011.
- The Rwanda Healing Project, The Harvard Advocate, Winter 2013.
- Healing from Genocide in Rwanda: Rugerero Survivors Village, an Artist Book, New Village Press, December 2021.

== Film ==
- The Barefoot Artist. Biographical feature-length documentary about Lily Yeh, directed by Glenn Holsten and Daniel Traub, 2013.
