= Daniel Traub =

New York City-based photographer and filmmaker

- Born: 1971 (age 54–55); Philadelphia, Pennsylvania, United States
- Education: Sarah Lawrence College; School of Visual Arts
- Known for: Photography, Filmmaking
- Website: danieltraub.net

Daniel Traub (born 1971) is a New York City-based photographer and filmmaker. Much of his work focuses on border regions and marginalized communities.

Traub's photographs have been exhibited internationally, including solo exhibitions at the Catherine Edelman Gallery in Chicago, Slought Foundation in Philadelphia and the Lianzhou Photo Festival in China. His work can be found in public and private collections, such as the Margulies Collection at the WAREhOUSE and the San Francisco Museum of Modern Art.

Traub's work has also appeared in publications including Aperture, European Photography and The New York Times Magazine.

== Education ==
Traub was born and grew up in Philadelphia, PA, the son of architect David S. Traub and artist Lily Yeh. He is also the nephew of photographer and educator Charles H. Traub.

Traub began photographing at age twelve exploring the streets of Philadelphia. He later studied photography formally with Joel Sternfeld at Sarah Lawrence College as well as film production and film history with Abigail Child and Gilberto Perez respectively. He received his MFA from the MFA Photo, Video and Related Media department of the School of Visual Arts in New York City where he studied with Raghubir Singh, Max Kozloff and others.

== Photography ==
Traub lived in China from 1998 to 2007 where he was engaged with long-term photographic projects, including Simplified Characters, a series of street pictures that explore the vast changes at the beginning of the 21st century in Chinese cities, as well as the series Peripheries, which looks at the landscape at the outskirts of several major Chinese cities. In 2007 he moved back to the United States and began a project looking at the city where he was born, Philadelphia. He also continued to travel extensively, including returning frequently to China where he worked on the longterm project from 2009 to 2014 Little North Road.

Daniel Traub has published two monographs with Kehrer Verlag: North Philadelphia (2014) and Little North Road (2015).

=== North Philadelphia ===
North Philadelphia is a photographic portrait of a neighborhood in prolonged crisis. The book presents a glimpse into an urban area that hovers between decay and possibility, and is emblematic of many such regions across the United States. Made between 2008 and 2013, North Philadelphia combines images of dilapidated homes, vacant lots, and street corners with portraits of the residents.

Traub's North Philadelphia has inspired the film Night Comes On to play in Philadelphia.

=== Little North Road ===
Little North Road is a photographic collaboration that looks at a pedestrian bridge in the middle of Guangzhou. The bridge serves as a symbolic gateway into China from Africa. At the heart of this project is a selection of images collected from two Chinese itinerant portrait photographers, Wu Yong Fu and Zeng Xian Fang. Equipped with digital cameras, they have made a living making portraits for Africans and other groups who wanted a memento of their time in China. Daniel Traub's photographs on the bridge and immediate vicinity explore the broader dynamics of the area and provide a context through which to see these portraits.

== Filmmaking ==
As a filmmaker, Traub has directed documentaries including the feature length Barefoot Artist about Lily Yeh and her collaborative artworks in war-torn communities; and Xu Bing: Phoenix, which highlights the condition of Chinese migrant labourers. He has been the director of photography for numerous documentaries and reports for networks and production companies including PBS, Arte and German Television ZDF where he worked extensively with senior correspondent Joachim Holtz. In 2011, Daniel Traub founded the film production company Itinerant Pictures. In 2019, he completed Ursula von Rydingsvard: Into Her Own, a feature-length documentary on the artist Ursula von Rydingsvard.

== Publications ==
- Chinescape. Zeng Han, Ed. Shenzhen, China 2010. ISBN 9110328130.
- North Philadelphia. Kehrer Verlag, Heidelberg, Germany 2014. ISBN 978-3-86828-478-2. A monograph.
- Little North Road. Kehrer Verlag, Heidelberg, Germany 2015. ISBN 978-3-86828-629-8. A monograph.

== Exhibitions ==
=== Solo ===
- Belfast Exposed, Belfast, Northern Ireland, 2007 (Two-person exhibition)
- FotoFest, Houston, TX, 2008 (Two-person exhibition)
- Catherine Edelman Gallery, Chicago, IL, 2008
- Print Center, Philadelphia, PA, 2010
- Lianzhou Foto Festival, Lianzhou, China, 2011
- Bluesky Gallery, Portland, OR, 2012
- Slought Foundation, Philadelphia, PA, 2015
- Lianzhou Foto Festival, Lianzhou, China, 2017/18

=== Group ===
- Chinese Culture Center, San Francisco, CA, 2016
- SF Camerawork, San Francisco, CA, 2016
- James A. Michener Art Museum, Doylestown, PA, 2016
- Ivorypress, Madrid, Spain, 2016/2017
- SCoP Shanghai Center of Photography, China, 2017
- Guangzhou Image Triennial, Guangzhou, China, 2017/18
- Weltkulturen Museum, Frankfurt, Germany, 2019
- Philadelphia Museum of Art, Philadelphia, PA, 2021

== Public collections ==
- San Francisco Museum of Modern Art, San Francisco, CA
- Margulies Collection at the Warehouse, Miami, FL
- Portland Art Museum, Portland, OR
- Philadelphia Museum of Art, Philadelphia, PA
- Free Library of Philadelphia, Philadelphia, PA

== Awards and honors ==
- FotoFestiwal, Lodz, Poland, Award, 2007
- Photo District News 30, 2008
- 24th Festival International de Mode et de Photographie à Hyères, France, Finalist, 2009
- Center for Emerging Visual Artists, Philadelphia, PA, Fellowship, 2009
- Atlantic Center for the Arts, New Smyrna Beach, Florida, Residency, 2009
- The Photo Review Competition, First prize, 2009
- Paris Photo-Aperture Photobook Prize, France, Finalist, 2016
