= Grove Isle =

- Coconut Grove, Miami
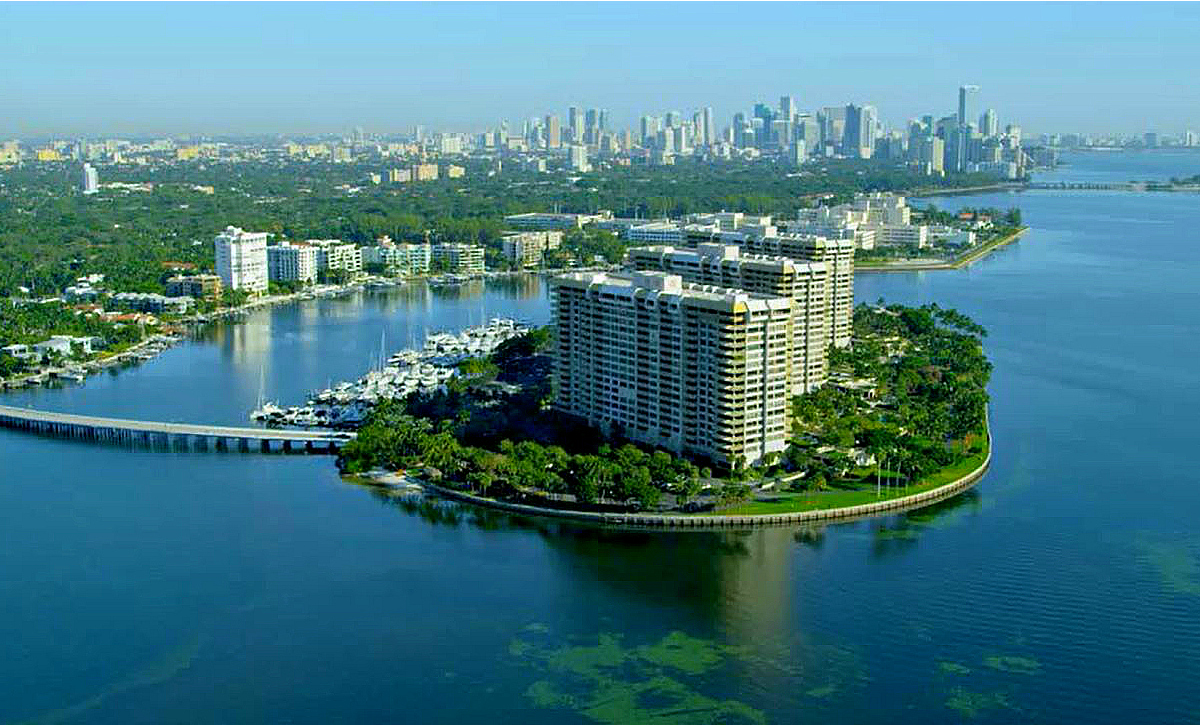
- Grove Isle in Biscayne Bay in Miami

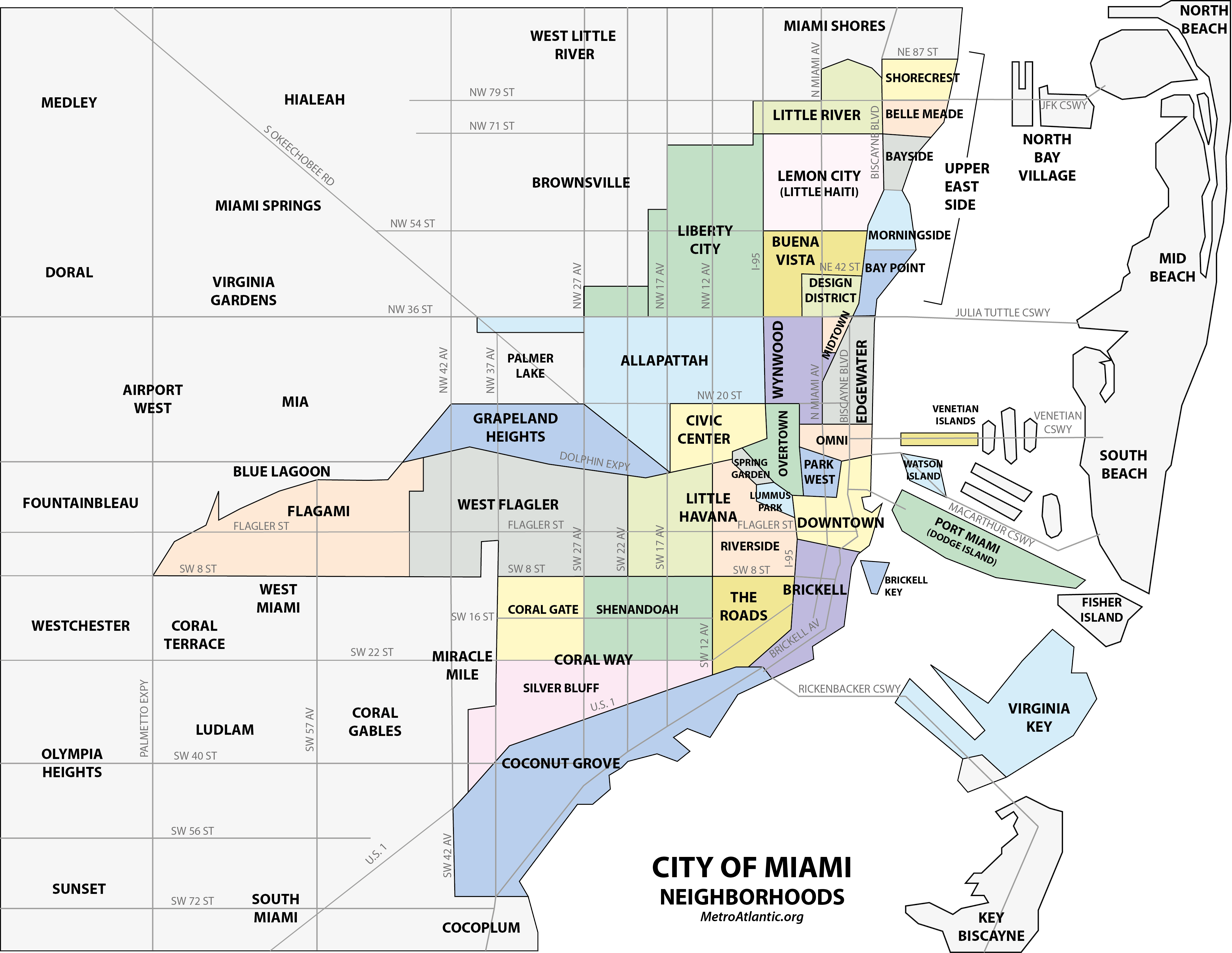
- Grove Isle lies off Coconut Grove's coast in Miami
- Coordinates: 25°44′09″N 80°13′07″W
- Country: United States
- State: Florida
- County: Miami-Dade County
- City: Miami
- Neighborhood: Coconut Grove

Area
  - Total: 0.03125 sq mi (0.0809 km^{2})
- Highest elevation: 6 ft (1.8 m)
- Lowest elevation: 3 ft (0.91 m)
- Time zone: UTC-05 (EST)
- ZIP Code: 33133
- Area codes: 305, 786

Grove Isle is a 20-acre (81,000 m^{2}) island lying off the north-east coast of Miami's Coconut Grove neighborhood. Three waterfront hi-rise residences were built on the island in the late 1970s. They were master-planned to include a resort hotel, restaurants, marina, club amenities and services. A fourth residential complex was completed in 2026.

== Origins ==
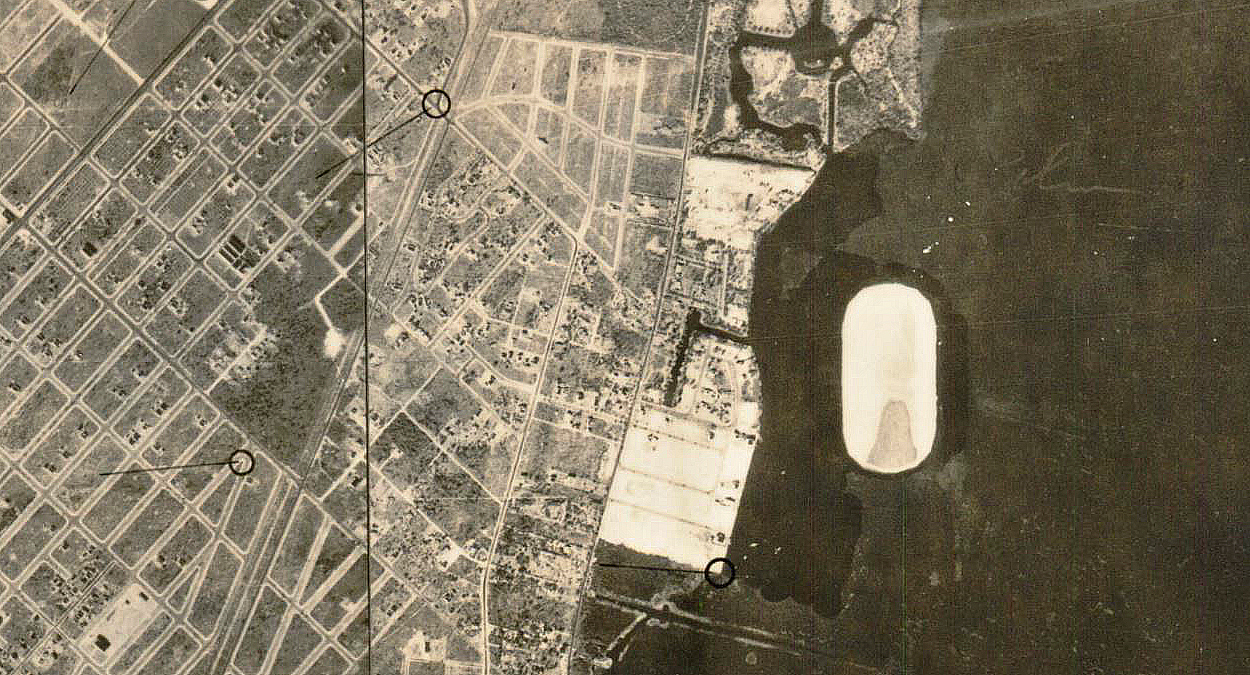
Fair Isle, now Grove Isle, off Miami's Coconut Grove coast in 1928

First known as Fair Isle, its land was dredged out from Biscayne Bay in 1924 (Note: During the boom years of the early 1920s the spoil bank that would become Fair Isle, now Grove Isle, was created when an L-shaped canal and channel were dredged in the area. In 1924 a wooden bulkhead was constructed around the spoil bank and the area was filled to a 2 foot elevation (Voss, 1974)) by the Corps of Engineers and subsequently subdivided in 1925. Many artificial islands of the period, such as Fair Isle, were formed when artificial inlets were cut into Biscayne Bay's coastline. The isle was then sold to investors at the height of the Florida Land Boom in less than four hours and for over $1.5 million. A combination of real estate crash, freight blockades and hurricane damage during 1925–26 stalled further property development of Miami and the island.

== Development ==
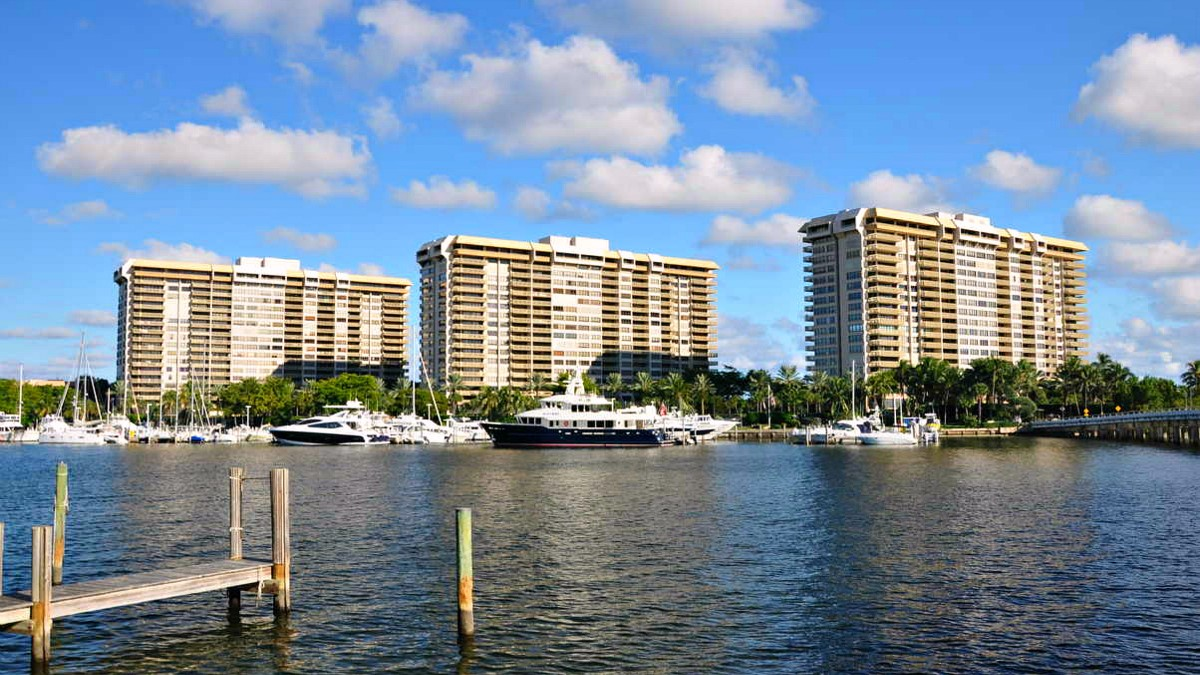
Miami's Grove Isle Condominium, Club and Marina

The island remained largely untouched—a large sand bar covered with Australian Pines where locals swam—until large scale development came to Coconut Grove in the late 1970s and early 1980s. The island was purchased for $6 million and restrictions on the island's development were finally agreed after protracted litigation over its size was settled in July 1977. Cabot, Cabot and Forbes of Massachusetts were one of the principal sellers of the island. Martin Margulies and Sun Bank of Miami were its eventual buyers and subsequently invested $100 million to develop the property.

Burton Goldberg, the notorious Miami nightclub impresario, had previously hoped to make the island's "sailboat key" club and residential project the largest in South Florida. His development ended in foreclosure having been stalled by legal battles with stakeholders and residents. The design was significantly reworked and Margulies' scaled-back development was finally completed in 1982. Off-island Club membership was also agreed so its amenities would be enjoyed by the wider community. The project finally consisted of three residential towers, a hotel and club, (Note: The Grove Isle Hotel and Club would go on to become a member of the Relais & Chateau Archived 2018-04-26 at the Wayback Machine fellowship of individually owned and operated luxury hotels and restaurants (2001). The renown restaurant Baleen Archived 2018-04-26 at the Wayback Machine was also located at the Grove Isle Club.) deep-water marina, pools, professional tennis club, original 55 piece sculpture gardens. The Grove Isle development set the standard for high-end Miami property.

Grove Isle lies in parts three feet above sea level. Its drainage system was surveyed as part of the condominium's 40 year re-certification project.

== Character ==
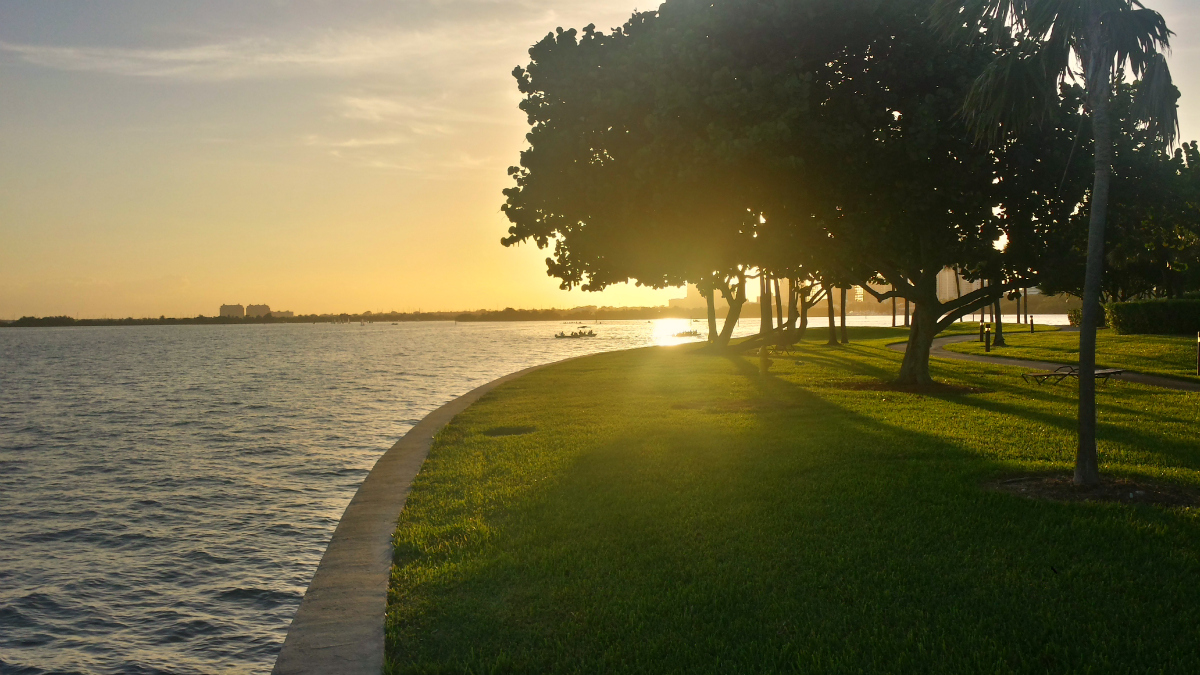
The expansive gardens of Grove Isle in Miami

Grove Isle provides one of the most secluded spots to live in Miami and is highly prized "by residents for its tranquility and panoramic bay views". Its residents have included past Heads of State, Senators, judges, lawyers, doctors, corporate leaders, entrepreneurs and philanthropists. Grove Isle has been described as one of the most affluent neighborhoods in the United States.

The Palmeiras Beach Club and Hotel, Spa, Grove Isle Marina and Cliff Drysdale Grove Isle Tennis Club were located on the island. The world-class Grove Isle Sculpture Garden once comprised part of the island's landscaped design. The three residential towers' interior designs were unique in the area for their Asian themes and accents. The island club restaurant, operating under the name of Baleen and then Gibraltar, were well regarded in their time.

The island's wide open spaces and expansive tree canopy are valued highly by its residents. The gardens and decks of Grove Isle were replanted after damage received from Hurricane Irma in September 2017. Major renovations to improve the structural and aesthetic integrity of the three towers, their decks and the gardens were also undertaken. The retention of the island's tree canopy and its mature trees remain a priority for many on Grove Isle and in Coconut Grove. Not all trees were replanted after the hurricane.

== Controversy ==
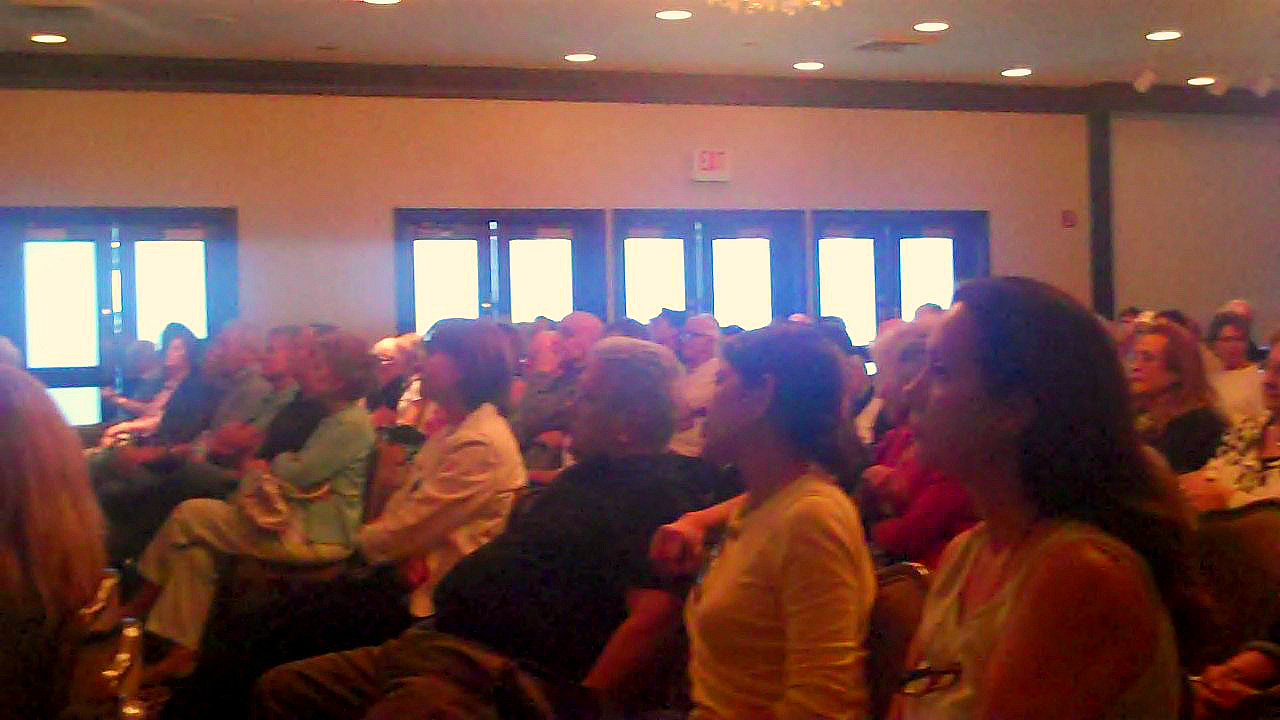
Grove Isle residents meet with developer representatives in October 2014

Competing visions for Grove Isle's future have at times embroiled the island in controversy. Its 1980 development was only permitted under a landmark settlement after the project was significantly scaled back over a decade of litigation and protest. A further proposal to develop the island's yacht club also ended up in court due to concerns about its environmental impact. The residents association also worked to protect the island against the impact of a high-rise project on an adjacent Mercy Hospital site.

More recently, attempts to close the island's club were halted by court order in August 2015. This was linked to efforts, first started in 2013, to build a further residential development on the island. Residents' efforts to retain the island's hotel, which was put at risk by the new development plans, resulted in litigation in 2017. The Grove Isle club and hotel were demolished in 2020. The development project then underwent a change in ownership and was rebranded the following year. The building received its Temporary Certificate of Occupancy in late 2025, over 12 years after initial proposals for the site were made.

Issues regarding club membership rights, the quality of club amenities, city planning laws, bridge safety and further development plans for the island have involved lengthy legal intervention. (Note: Notable litigation involving Grove Isle includes: Grove Isle, Ltd. v. Bayshore Homeowners' Ass'n, 418 So. 2d 1046 (Fla. 1st DCA 1982). (administrative and environmental appeal concerning permits issued by the Florida Department of Natural Resources and Department of Environmental Regulation for the construction of a 90-slip private marina on submerged state lands in Biscayne Bay).; Grove Isle Ass'n, Inc. v. Grove Isle Assocs., LLLP, 137 So. 3d 1081 (Fla. 3d DCA 2014). (condominium governance dispute addressing whether mandatory club membership provisions, annual dues increases, and public access terms in the island's Declaration of Condominium were unconscionable under Florida Statutes sections 718.122 and 718.302).; Save Grove Isle, LLC v. City of Miami (Fla. 3d DCA 1 December 2021), Text. (zoning challenge brought by resident groups contesting the City of Miami's development approvals to redevelop the island's hotel and club parcel into the Vita at Grove Isle condominium project).; Preserve Grove Isle, LLC v. Grove Isle Yacht & Tennis Club, LLC (Fla. 3d DCA), Text. (appellate ruling affirming lower court deference to condominium association declaration amendments and settlement agreements facilitating new island construction).; Grove Isle Ass'n, Inc. v. Lindzon (Fla. 3d DCA 10 November 2022), Text. (dispute over common-element roof maintenance duties under Florida Statutes section 718.113(1) and the evidentiary threshold required to plead punitive damages against a condominium association).; Miami-Dade Circuit Court platting litigation (2025–2027), a lawsuit filed by residents and neighborhood coalitions alleging the City of Miami violated Section 55-10 of the city code by issuing building permits for Vita at Grove Isle without requiring formal subdivision platting; see "On Grove Isle, New Tower, Old Complaints". Coconut Grove Spotlight. 24 August 2026..)

== Gallery ==
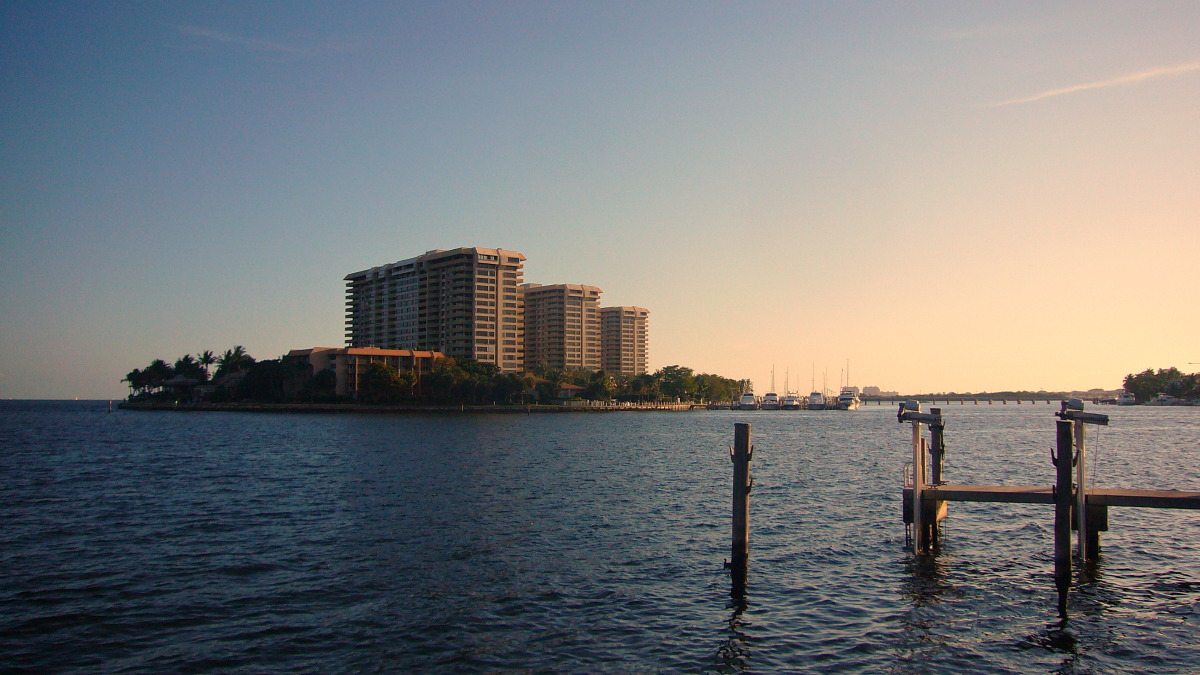
Grove Isle Condominium, Hotel & Club

Grove Isle gardens with its bay views

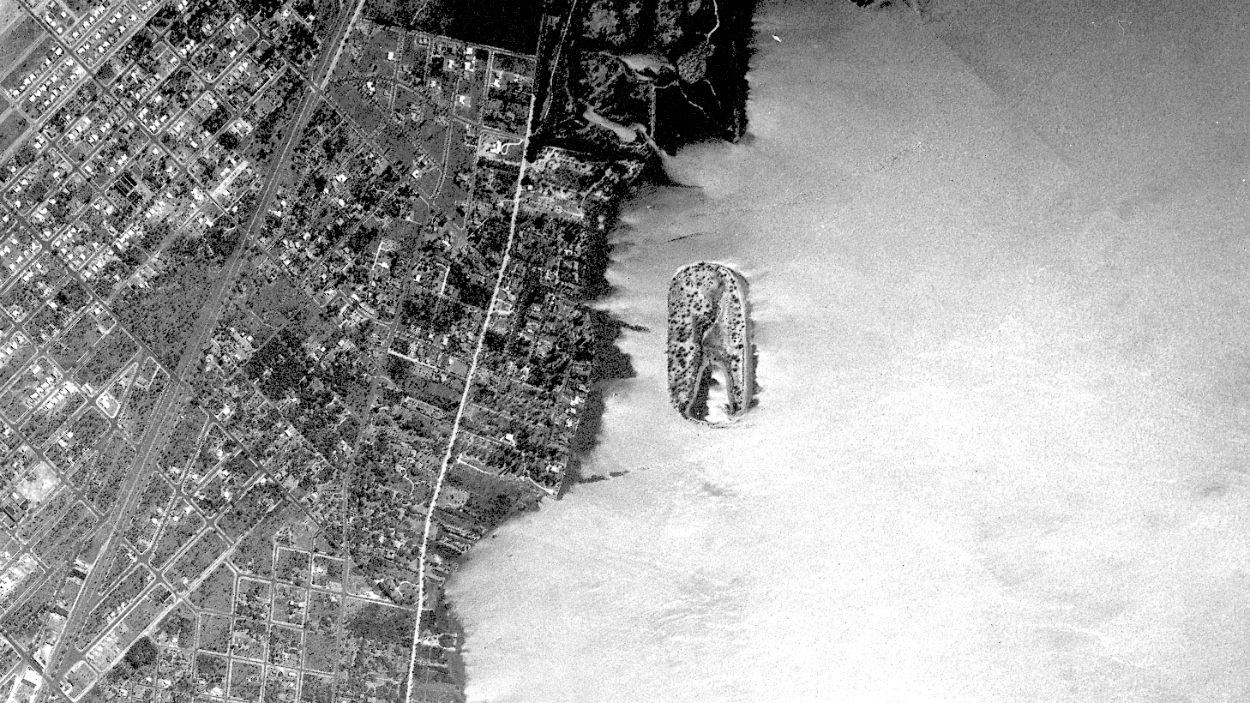
Grove Isle (then Fair Isle) lying off Miami's Coconut Grove in 1940

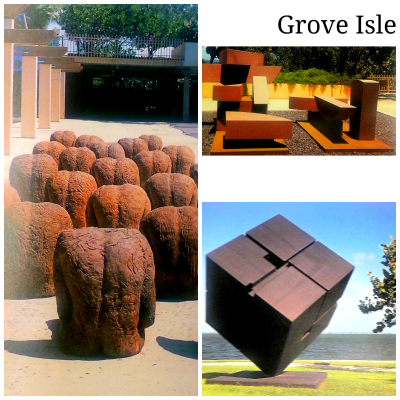
Original Grove Isle Sculpture Decks and Gardens (now moved)

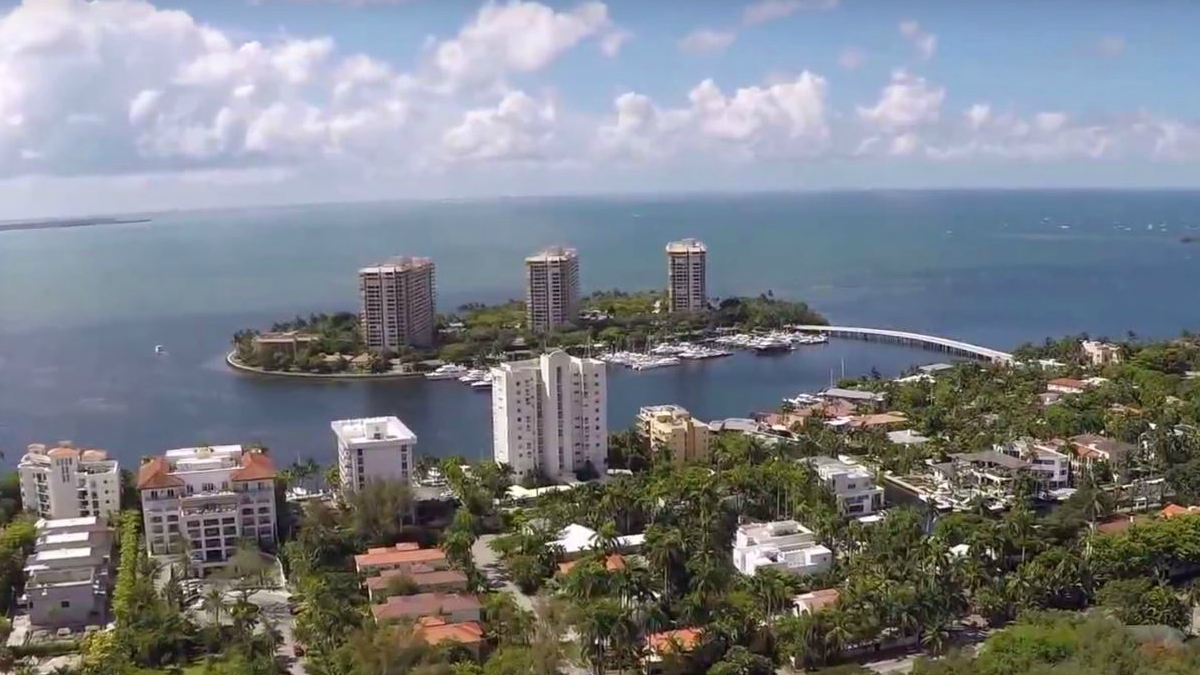
View of Grove Isle & Biscayne Bay from Coconut Grove

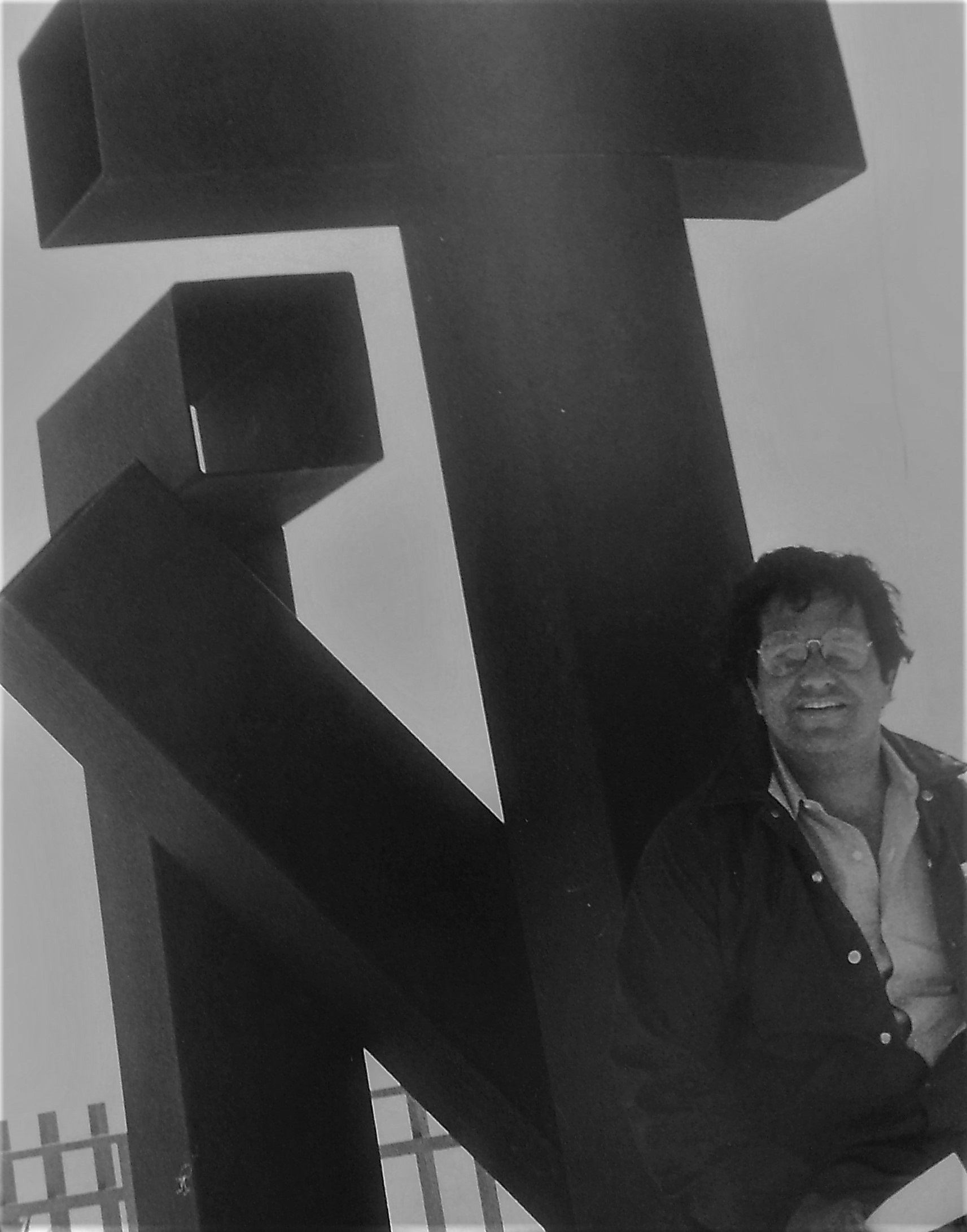
Image of Martin Margulies taken on the Sculpture Deck on Grove Isle

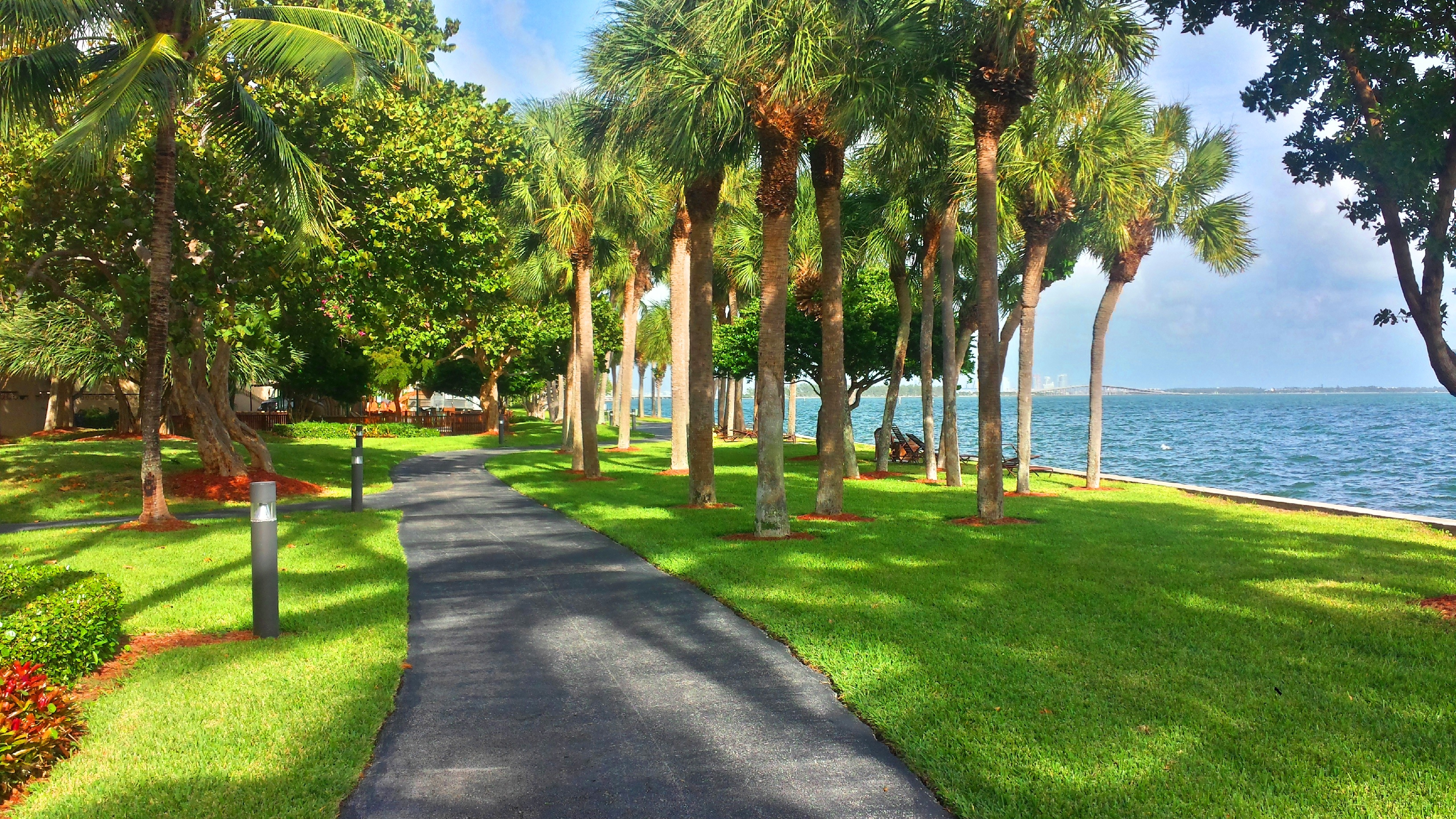
Grove Isle gardens along Biscayne Bay

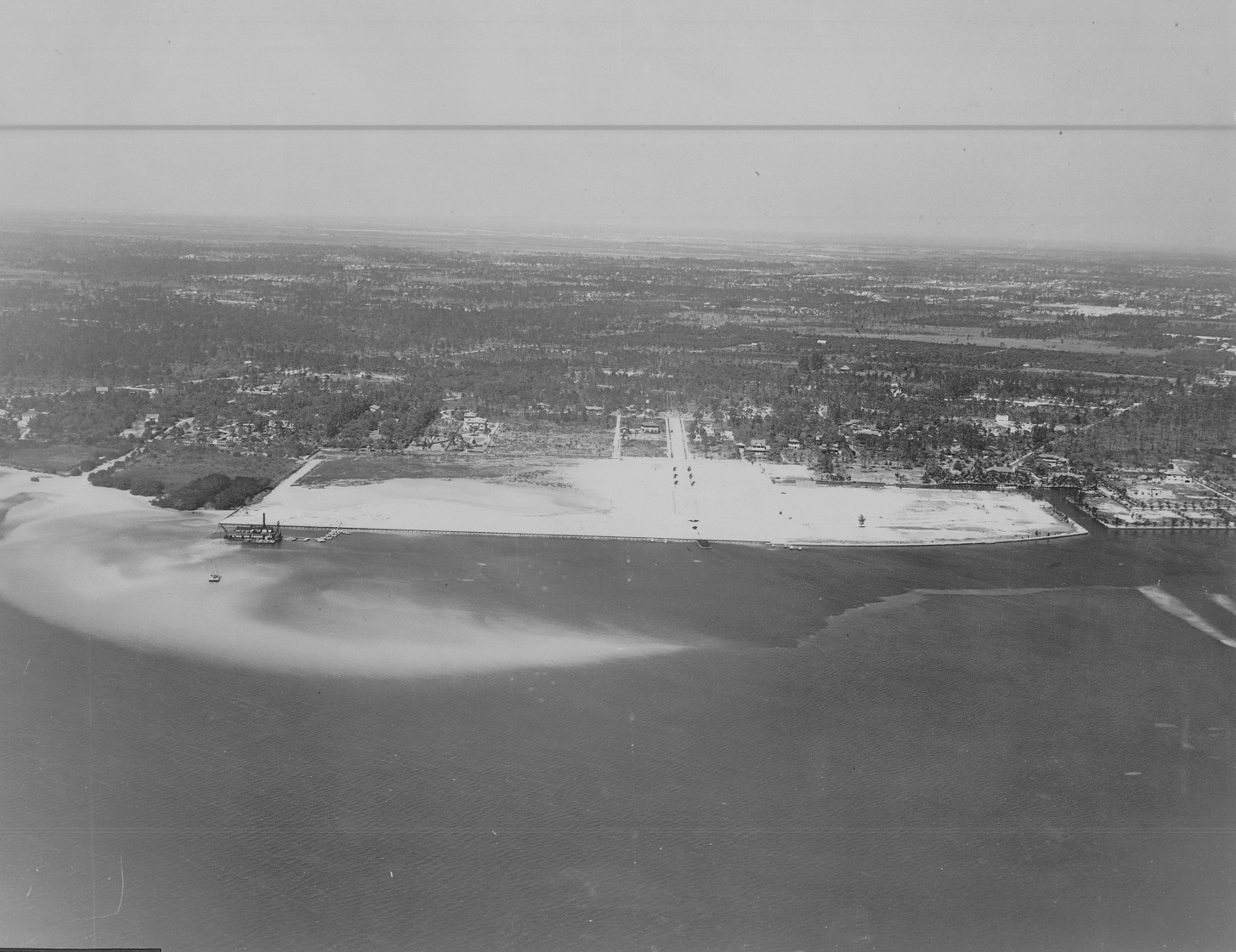
Coconut Grove coast before Fair (Grove) Isle was dredged out of the bay in 1923

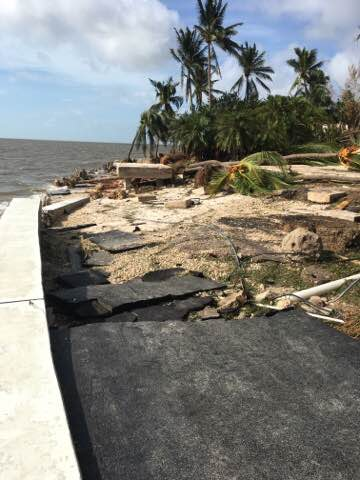
Hurricane Irma hits Grove Isle in September 2017

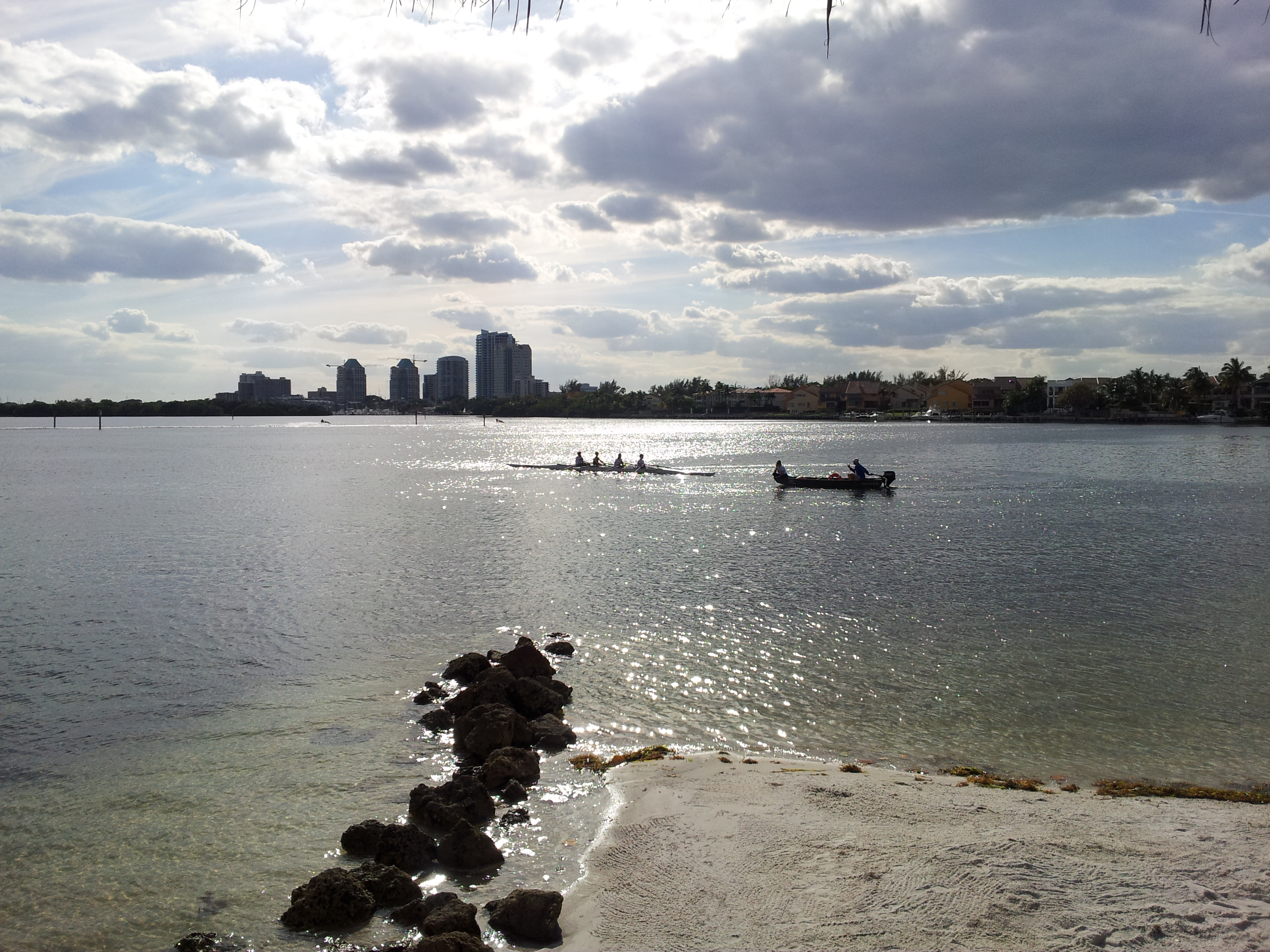
Rowing Team off Grove Isle Beach

== See also ==
- Barrier island
- Lists of islands
- Coconut Grove

== Bibliography and further reading ==
- Final Settlement of 27 July 1977, Circuit Court of the 11th Judicial Circuit in and for Dade County, Florida, Case No. 73-6449 copy accessed January 11, 2016
- Margulies, M., Harper, P., & Varon, M. (1986). Contemporary sculpture from the Martin Z. Margulies collection: Grove Isle, Coconut Grove, Florida. Coconut Grove, Fla: Martin Z. Margulies Collection. 144 pp. [UM and FIU Libraries Special Collections]
- Moore Parks, A. and Bennett, B. (2010) Coconut Grove, Florida: Arcadia Publishing, p. 128
- Nepomechie, M., & Brooke, S. (2010). Building paradise: An architectural guide to the Magic City. Miami, FL: AIA Miami.
- Voss G. (1974) Biological survey and development recommendations for Fair Isle, Biscayne Bay, Fla. Unpublished manuscript. University of Miami, Rosenstiel School of Marine and Atmospheric Science, Miami, FL. 15 pp.
