= Favela Painting =

Community artwork in Brazil

- Type of project: Community Artwork
- Location: Rio de Janeiro, Brazil
- Founder: Haas&Hahn
- Established: 2006
- Funding: Donations and Grants
- Website: http://www.favelapainting.com

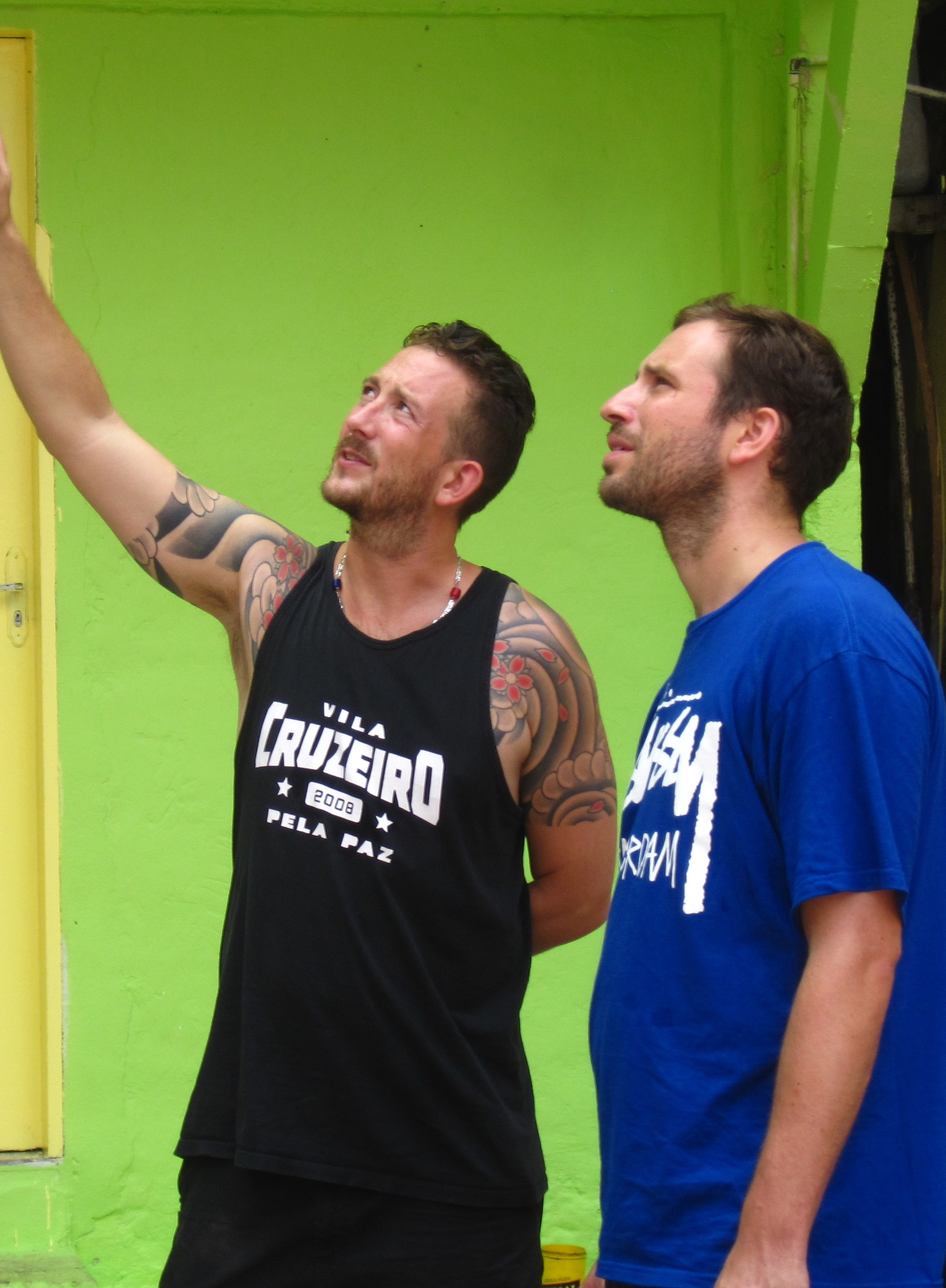
Haas&Hahn

Favela Painting is a series of community artworks in Rio de Janeiro, Brazil painted by Dutch artists Jeroen Koolhaas and Dre Urhahn (known as Haas&Hahn) with the help of local people. Firmeza Foundation, an organization based in Netherlands runs the project. The project is mainly funded by grants and donations and the main idea is to collaborate with the local people to create community artwork.

Three artworks have been completed under Favela Painting as of 2013. The first artwork in the project, "Boy with Kite" was completed in 2006 followed by the completion of the second artwork in 2008 – both painted in Vila Cruzeiro, a slum in Rio de Janeiro. In 2010, the duo painted murals over 7,000 square meters (75,000 sq. ft.) of public square in the Santa Marta. The ultimate goal of the artists is to paint an entire hillside favela in the center of Rio. Haas&Hahn have plans to return to Brazil to do further work under the Favela Painting project.

== Background ==
We wanted to do something that would give them an opportunity to become painters and that would call attention to the outside world to their situation.

— Urhahn told in an Interview with CNN

In 2005, Jeroen Koolhaas met Dre Urhahn to make a film on the hip hop culture of favelas in Rio de Janeiro, Brazil. While they were shooting the movie, they were inspired by the creativity and optimism of the people. On the other hand, they were shocked by the conditions of the favelas. In 2006, they started developing ideas for creating community-driven art projects in Brazil that could "transform the living environment and instill pride in the people." They started working with the local youth on the first painting, Boy with Kite, in 2007. Working with the youth there involved training and community immersion.

After the completion of the first painting Boy with Kite, they returned to the Netherlands to auction artworks related to the Favela Painting project. Using the funds collected in the auction, they returned to Rio de Janeiro to work on another similar community driven art project. Initially, the project was partly funded by the Dutch Ministry of Culture.

== Paintings ==
=== Boy with Kite ===
Boy with Kite is the first painting under the Favela Painting project. It is a 150m^{2} mural that is spread over three buildings facing a football field in Vila Cruzeiro. The artist duo started working on Boy with Kite in 2007 as a "symbol for the children of favela". The painting took three months to finish and was painted, together with local youth, who were attracted from the Soldados Nunca Mais program of the Ibiss foundation.

=== Rio Cruzeiro ===
Haas&Hahn returned to Vila Cruzeiro in 2007 to work on another artwork, Rio Cruzeiro, under the Favela Painting project. This artwork included painting a Japanese Style River in a street. Rob Admiraal, a Dutch tattoo artist accompanied the duo in this project and provided the design for the mural. It is spread over an area of 2000m^{2} and covers a containment wall, a public stairway, a path and a cement wall. Rio Cruzeiro depicts huge colored fish swimming in a blue river. It was completed in over a year.

=== Praça Cantão ===
In 2010, Haas&Hahn started designing models for painting a slum. After completing a model, they began work in Santa Marta the same year. In a time of one month, they recruited and trained 25 people to help them paint a square that spawned over 7000 square meter at the bottom of the favela. This included thirty-four surrounding houses, streets, and the interior of a popular samba studio. They started painting the slum in early 2010 and the project was completed the same year.

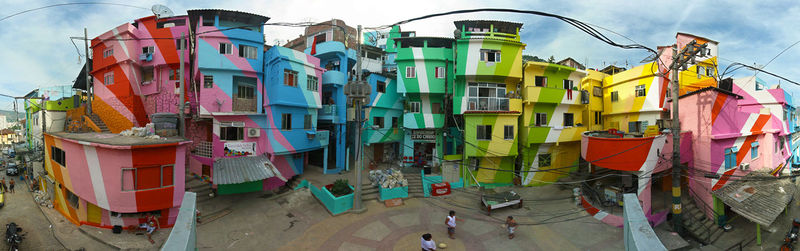
Praça Cantão, 2011

=== Philly Painting ===
From 2011 to 2012, Favela Painting carried out a large-scale painting project on Germantown Avenue, Philadelphia. The Philadelphia Mural Arts Program commissioned this project with the goal of revitalizing the neighborhood during a period of steady economic decline. Over 50 buildings were painted with a pattern of weaving bands of color. Favela Painting devised a system where one building's colors would lead into the next's, and the individual owners of each building would pick from a selection of color swatches. Ultimately, the project aimed to provide visual cohesion to Germantown Avenue as well as social unity to an area with high rates of crime and unemployment. Members of the community were recruited to work as painters, including teams of ex-prisoners, and many went on to get jobs with the Mural Arts Program.

=== Rua Santa Helena ===
Since 2018, Favela Painting has been working to transform the exteriors of the houses surrounding the Rio Cruzeiro mosaic. Rather than painting the buildings, which they have done in previous projects, this project involves the use of more sustainable materials.

== Response ==
Favela Painting has received positive feedback from the media and general public. These artworks have been called "points of pride" in the community throughout Rio. ‘Rio Cruzeiro’ and Praça Cantão were covered by news agencies such as Fox News, Al Jazeera, The Daily Telegraph, and The Rio Times. In Brazil, the painting attracted reporters from several newspapers and TV stations. The New York Times Style Magazine also wrote an article about Favela Painting project. Shasta Darlington with CNN wrote, "While crime hasn't abated, the project put Vila Cruzeiro on the map for something other than drug trafficking."

Artwork related to Favela Painting project has been displayed at several exhibitions around the world. Kallenbach Gallery at Westergas in Amsterdam showed the Favela Painting Expo in December 2010. In 2011 Shenzhen & Hong Kong Bi-City Biennale of Urbanism\Architecture featured artwork related to Favela Painting project.

In 2011, the Herald Sun News paper of Australia called the Praça Cantão one of the most colorful places in the world. The image of Praça Cantão was used as the flagship image for a show "Design with the Other 90%: Cities," the second in a series of themed exhibitions by Cooper-Hewitt at the United Nations Headquarters in 2011.

The painted slum of Santa Marta has also been used as a set in the American movie Fast Five. Favela Painting project was featured in a 2012 book titled “Design Like You Give a Damn [2]: Building Change from the Ground Up” among other projects such as Make It Right Foundation New Orleans by Brad Pitt and High Line in New York City.

== Exhibitions ==
Year	Exhibition	Location	Notes
2007	Favela Painting Auction	Amsterdam	At IJ-toren
2007	Favela Painting Photo Exhibit	Shenzhen	HK/SZ-biennale
2007	Boy with Kite Exhibit	Amsterdam	At Studio Apart
2007	Play: Experience the Adventure of Our Cities	Manchester	
2009	Artworks and Sketches 'O Morro'	Amsterdam	
2009	Live Painting (JK)	Amsterdam	At Sid Lee Collective Space
2009	Video Installation	Amsterdam	At Art Market
2010	GGG Exhibit	Miami	Art Basel
2011	Design with the Other 90%: Cities	United Nations HQ, NYC	Organized by Cooper-Hewitt
2011	Shenzhen & Hong Kong Bi-City Biennale	Shenzhen & Hong Kong	3 Painted Rooms with Lightboxes
2011	Painting Urbanism	New York	at Storefront for Art and Architecture
2011	'Three the Hard way'	Berlin	At Galerie Schau Fenster

== See also ==
- Philly Painting
