= Traube =

Traube is a German surname meaning "grape". Notable people with the surname include:

- Hermann Traube (1860–1913), German mineralogist
- Klaus Traube (1928–2016), prominent German opponent of nuclear power
- Ludwig Traube (physician) (1818–1876), physician
- Ludwig Traube (palaeographer) (1861–1907), palaeographer
- Moritz Traube (1826–1894), German chemist
- Wilhelm Traube (1866–1942), German chemist

== Medicine ==
- Traube's space

== See also ==
- Traub
