= Peter Traub =

American composer

- Born: Peter Michael Traub; Johannesburg, South Africa
- Education: M.A. Electronic Music Composition, Dartmouth College Ph.D. Composition and Computer Technologies, University of Virginia
- Known for: electronic music, net art, digital art, sound installation

Peter Traub (born 1974 in South Africa) is an American composer of electronic and acoustic music and sound installations. His work often focuses on the use of technology to mediate physical and virtual spaces.

== Biography ==
Traub was born in Johannesburg, South Africa, in 1974, emigrating to the United States with his family in 1982. Although he lacked a musical upbringing and did not play an instrument, Traub discovered the possibilities of electronic music during his undergraduate work at the University of Florida. Studying with Dr. James Paul Sain, he wrote his first pieces of electronic music at the Florida Electroacoustic Music Studio from 1995 - 1997. In 1997, Traub entered the Masters Program in Electro-Acoustic Music at Dartmouth College. There, he studied for two years with Jon Appleton, Charles Dodge, Eric Lyon, Larry Polansky, and Christian Wolff. His Masters Thesis was the Internet sound installation, bits & pieces (1999). After leaving Dartmouth, Traub move to the San Francisco Bay Area where he worked for various internet startups until 2004. While there, he also spent time composing at Stanford University's Center for Computer Research in Music and Acoustic.

In 2004, Traub moved to Charlottesville, Virginia to begin Ph.D. work at The Virginia Center for Computer Music. There, he studied with Matthew Burtner, Ted Coffey, and Judith Shatin until completing his Ph.D. in 2010. Since 2007 Traub has also been a guest contributor to the Networked_Music_Review, a blog that focuses on art and music that incorporates computer networks. His primary contributions to the blog are interviews with established new media artists such as Bill Fontana, Max Neuhaus, Janet Cardiff and George Bures Miller, and Golan Levin.

On February 25, 2008, NPR's mid-day news show, "Day to Day" featured a segment on his online sound installation, ItSpace.

Samples of his work can be heard on his website, petertraub.net

== Selected Concert Works and Installations ==
- Curve (2010), site-specific sound installation for a long curved wall
- Study No. 1 for Bodies, Metal, and Air (2010), collaboration with choreographer Dinah Grah
- Solera: for sound, site, and time (2009), site-specific sound installation
- convergence (2007), for multichannel tape
- nodes (2006), for violin, oboe, and network-connected spaces
- ground loops (2005), for solo percussion and internet feedback
- points of interest (2005), for solo trombone
- bassoonism (2004), for solo bassoon
- portfoliosis (2003), eight-channel computer generated tape
- retour (2002), eight-channel computer generated tape
- cable (1999), computer generated tape
- experiment on unknown sample (1999), processed internet sound
- Jonestown (1999), tambourine, voice, and real-time computer processing
- trilogy (1998), computer generated tape
- water retention (1996), computer generated tape

== Network Art ==
- WoodEar (2013) , a generative sound and video installation using live sensor data from a tree. Video in collaboration with Jennifer Lauren Smith.
- ItSpace (2007) , an online participatory sound installation using MySpace.com
- Sibling Revelry (2001) web-based interactive sound installation, collaboration with Gregory Traub
- NetSong (2000) web-based sound installation for synthesized voice and search engine, collaboration with Amy Alexander
- bits & pieces (1999) web-based sound installation for processing and collaging internet audio samples
