= The Village of Arts and Humanities =

The Village of Arts and Humanities is an arts organization in North Philadelphia. The Village was founded by Lily Yeh, an artist and Chinese immigrant who was a tenured professor at the Philadelphia School of Fine Arts. It has renovated dozens of urban lots and empty buildings with murals, mosaics, and gardens. In 2001 it received the Rudy Bruner Award for Urban Excellence.

The Village was the subject of a Public Broadcasting Service documentary entitled An Angel in the Village.

== Programs and Projects ==
People's Paper Co-op

The People's Paper Co-op was a program based at The Village of Arts and Humanities that seeks women in reentry as the leading criminal experts..Through the sales of artworks and t-shirts the People's Paper Co-op raised over $240,000 to free black mothers and caregivers for Mother's Day (2018-2024). Twice a year the PPC, provided fellowships to formerly incarcerated women to lead creative campaigns to support and expand legal services, bailouts, advocacy efforts.

CRED Philly Magazine

Philadelphia based The Village of Arts and Humanities magazine, CRED magazine, was a magazine innovative to feature youth artists. The self curated and published magazine is the work of a network of motivated artists from across the Philadelphia region, all of which are under the age of 25. The project was realized through mentorship with community members.
