= David S. Traub =

American architect

- Born: September 6, 1941; Louisville, Kentucky,
- Occupation: Architect
- Awards: Merit Award Ruberoid Competition; Grand Jury Award, Preservation Alliance for Greater Philadelphia
- Projects: Philadelphia preservation organization "Save Our Sites"

David S. Traub (September 6, 1941, Louisville, Kentucky) is an American architect, author and playwright based in Philadelphia.

== Biography ==
David S. Traub, a native of Louisville Kentucky, studied architecture and city planning at the University of Illinois at Urbana–Champaign and the University of Pennsylvania School of Design where he received a Masters of Architecture degree. At Penn in 1964, he studied in the Master's Class of the famous architect, Louis I. Kahn, with students who had gathered from around the world.

During the Vietnam War, Traub served in the Corps of Engineers in Honolulu working as an architect on both military and civilian projects. There, he was involved in many military and government construction projects in the Pacific area. Among them was a workshop facility in the Marshall Island for which he received the Army Commendation Medal for his work on its design and production of contract documents.

From 1970 to 1973, Traub worked in the office of Louis I. Kahn where he was assigned to two of the most important projects in the office at that time, the Kimbell Art Museum in Fort Worth, Texas and the Mellon Museum of British Art at Yale University in New Haven. During this time, Traub was also teaching in the Architectural Department at Philadelphia's Temple University from 1970 to 1971.

In 1974 Traub established his own office in Philadelphia. His firm, David S. Traub Associates, Architects, Planners and Interior Designers, has performed a variety of projects in the residential, commercial, and institutional fields. He has designed for the City of Philadelphia, including projects for The Philadelphia Department of Parks and Recreation and the Fairmount Park Commission. The firm's work also includes, historic restoration, town planning and interior design of offices, houses and condominiums. Together with the firm Cairone and Kaupp he has envisioned a preliminary plan for a greenway along the Allegheny Avenue that connects Campbell Square and Pulaski Park on the Delaware River. Traub is a member of the American Institute of Architects, the Society of Architectural Historians and the Housing Association of Delaware Valley. He is also a contributor to the University of Pennsylvania Architectural Archive.

The exhibition "Drawings" at the Central Penn National Bank in Philadelphia showed Traub's drawings in April 1981. In celebration in 1982 of the Tercentenary of the founding of the City of Philadelphia, Traub produced an exhibition entitled, Philadelphia, the Concealed City. The exhibition documented with photographs, Philadelphia's multitude of narrow streets, small public squares and hidden gardens, focusing on a "secret" city many residents and tourists never see. It was shown at the American Institute of Architects gallery, Girard Bank and at an architectural museum in Dayton, Ohio.

Traub has been involved in the area of historical restoration preparing plans for the reconstruction of a 19th-century Philadelphia school house and the Old Stetson Hospital Building. For the last several years, he has been very active in historic preservation in the Rittenhouse Square neighborhood in Philadelphia. Traub has written many articles concerning preservation issues that have arisen near the square and elsewhere, published amongst others in the Center City Weekly Press and The Philadelphia Inquirer. He is the co-founder of a new citywide preservation organization called SOS – Save Our Sites.

== Teaching and lectures ==
Besides Traub's teaching in the Architectural Department at Philadelphia's Temple University from 1970 to 1971, the following gives an overview of his lectures:

- 1973 "Architecture and Space", Rutgers University, Camden Department of Religion, April 1973
- 1982 "Piazza Navona and Baroque Rome", America-Italy Society, February 1982
- 1983 "Louis Kahn and Louis Sullivan, A Comparison of Two Architects", University of Pennsylvania, Department of Art History, March 1983
- 1983 "Walking Tour – Foundation for Architecture, Quaint and Secret Places in Washington Square West", Philadelphia, October 1983
- 1984 "Little Known Lucca, The Architecture and Town Planning of a Tuscan City", America-Italy Society, April 1984
- 1984 "Italy and Architecture", Foundation for Architecture, October 1984
- 1985 "Exploring Philadelphia's Quaint and Secret Places", Gallery at the Old Post Office, November 1985, Dayton, Ohio
- 1995 "Exploring Hidden Philadelphia", lectures and walking tours for the Landmarks Elderhostel Program, Philadelphia, Autumn 1995

== Books ==
- Searching for Philadelphia – The Concealed City, Camino Books, Philadelphia, 2013. ISBN 978-1-933822-78-5
- Discovering Philadelphia – Places Little Known, Camino Books, Philadelphia, 2017. ISBN 978-1-68098-019-6

== Stage Plays ==
Traub studied playwriting with Ed Shockley, a well-known Philadelphia playwright, actor, dramaturge and director, from 2007 until 2011.

=== Lincoln in Louisville ===
Traub's play in two acts Lincoln in Louisville, is a dramatization of an actual historical event, Abraham Lincoln's 1842 visit to Louisville, Kentucky, to stay at his close friend Joshua Speed's Farmington plantation where as many as fifty slaves toiled. Lincoln was in a depressed state of mind at the time due to the breakdown of his engagement to Mary Todd, setbacks in his political career, and his separation from Speed, who had recently left Illinois to return to Kentucky. Burdened with these problems, Lincoln had his first encounter with slavery operating all about him, rendering the visit a pivotal moment in his life. Lincoln's friendship with slaveholder Speed changed for the worse, but still their friendship survived. Speed's last visit to the White House was just two weeks before Lincoln's death.

Traub's long-time interest in Lincoln and issues of racial equality converged with the historical anniversaries in 2015: the 150th anniversary of the assassination of Lincoln, the end of the Civil War, and the passage of the 13th Amendment abolishing slavery everywhere in the United States. Kentucky was once a slave state itself and the birthplace of Abraham Lincoln. Since 1990, Traub has published journal articles for the Philadelphia Weekly Press on Abraham Lincoln and other subjects.

In 2009 and 2001, Lincoln in Louisville was produced in a staged public reading at the University of Louisville Thrust Theatre. The final production in staged public reading format was performed in 2012 at the Kentucky Center for the Arts in Louisville, successfully received by the audiences and actors, who urged that the play be presented in a full production. The play was finally performed at the Louisville Alley Theatre in June 2015.

The stage sets for all productions to date of Lincoln in Louisville were designed by Traub himself. Also a musician and performing cellist, he selected the music included in the staged public readings of the play.

== Personal life ==
Traub has a younger brother, photographer Charles H. Traub, and is the father of documentary filmmaker and photographer Daniel Traub.

== Awards and honors ==
- 1963 Merit Award, Ruberoid Competition – East River Urban Renewal Project, New York, NY
- 1976 Holy Trinity Housing Rehabilitation Project, Philadelphia Community Development Block Grant Program
- 2012 Grand Jury Award, Preservation Alliance for Greater Philadelphia

== Exhibitions ==
- 1981 Drawings, Central Penn National Bank, Philadelphia, April 1981
- 1982 Quaint and Secret Places, Philadelphia 1682–1982, The American Institute of Architects Gallery, Philadelphia, November 1982
- 1983 Four Recent Projects, The American Institute of Architects, Philadelphia, March 1983
- 1983 Quaint and Secret Places, Philadelphia 1682–1982, Girard Bank, Philadelphia, March 1983
- 2006 A Vision for Sansom Street, Roxy Theater lobby, Philadelphia, June 2006
