= Martin Margulies =

American art collector

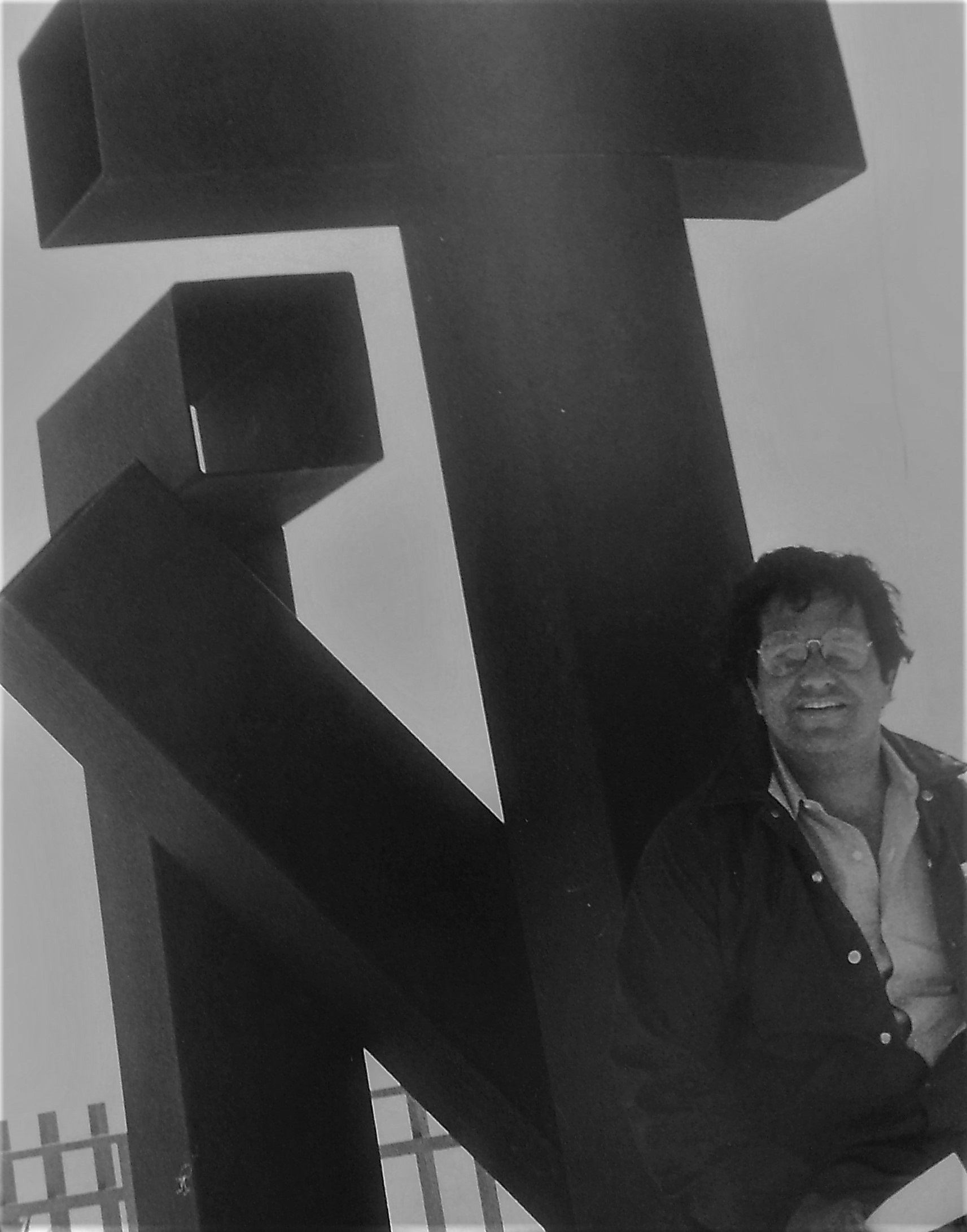
Martin Margulies with his art on Grove Isle in 1982

Martin Z. Margulies is a real-estate developer and collector of contemporary art and photography.

== Margulies collection ==
For many years, Margulies maintained a publicly accessible sculpture garden on Grove Isle, a small, private island with condominium towers and a hotel in Coconut Grove and historically one of the most exclusive addresses in the city. After tensions with island management, much of the collection was moved to Florida International University’s main campus in West Miami-Dade.

In 1998, Margulies along with his longtime curator Katherine Hinds began looking for a suitable space to display the growing collection. In 1999 they set up a warehouse space in then-derelict Wynwood to show his holdings of contemporary and vintage photography, video, sculpture and installation work. The space was expanded and now offers over 50,000 sq ft (4,600 m^{2}) of exhibition space. The Margulies Collection includes sculptures by the likes of Willem de Kooning, Anselm Kiefer, Olafur Eliasson, Antony Gormley, Donald Judd and Sol LeWitt. In 2010, to coincide with Art Basel Miami Beach, the space showed both African artists and non-African artists who work in Africa: Seydou Keïta, Zwelethu Mthethwa, George Osodi, Peter Friedl and Tim Hetherington, among others.

== Philanthropy ==
Margulies is also the benefactor and owner of the Florida International University Art Sculpture Park. In 2010, he made significant bequests of $20 million to Lotus House, a Miami homeless shelter for women and infants, and of $5 million to the New World Symphony, an orchestral academy based in Miami.

Also in 2010, Margulies pledged $5 million each to the Metropolitan Museum of Art and the Whitney Museum of American Art in New York, a move that underlined his very public opposition to plans to redevelop the local Miami Art Museum (MAM). At the time, MAM was struggling to raise funds for its Herzog & de Meuron-designed new building which eventually opened in 2013. Margulies even took full-page advertisements in local papers to contest the project.

== Controversy ==
In 1982, Margulies led the opposition against a $500,000 commission to artist Beverly Pepper for a sculpture that would stand at the entrance to the seaport, citing in his complaint to the Dade County Art in Public Places program "the weak selection process" by which the Pepper work was chosen. Previously, the 1980 development of Grove Isle in Miami was only possible with Margulies' involvement who crafted a landmark settlement which significantly scaled back the project after a decade of litigation and local protest.

== Gallery ==
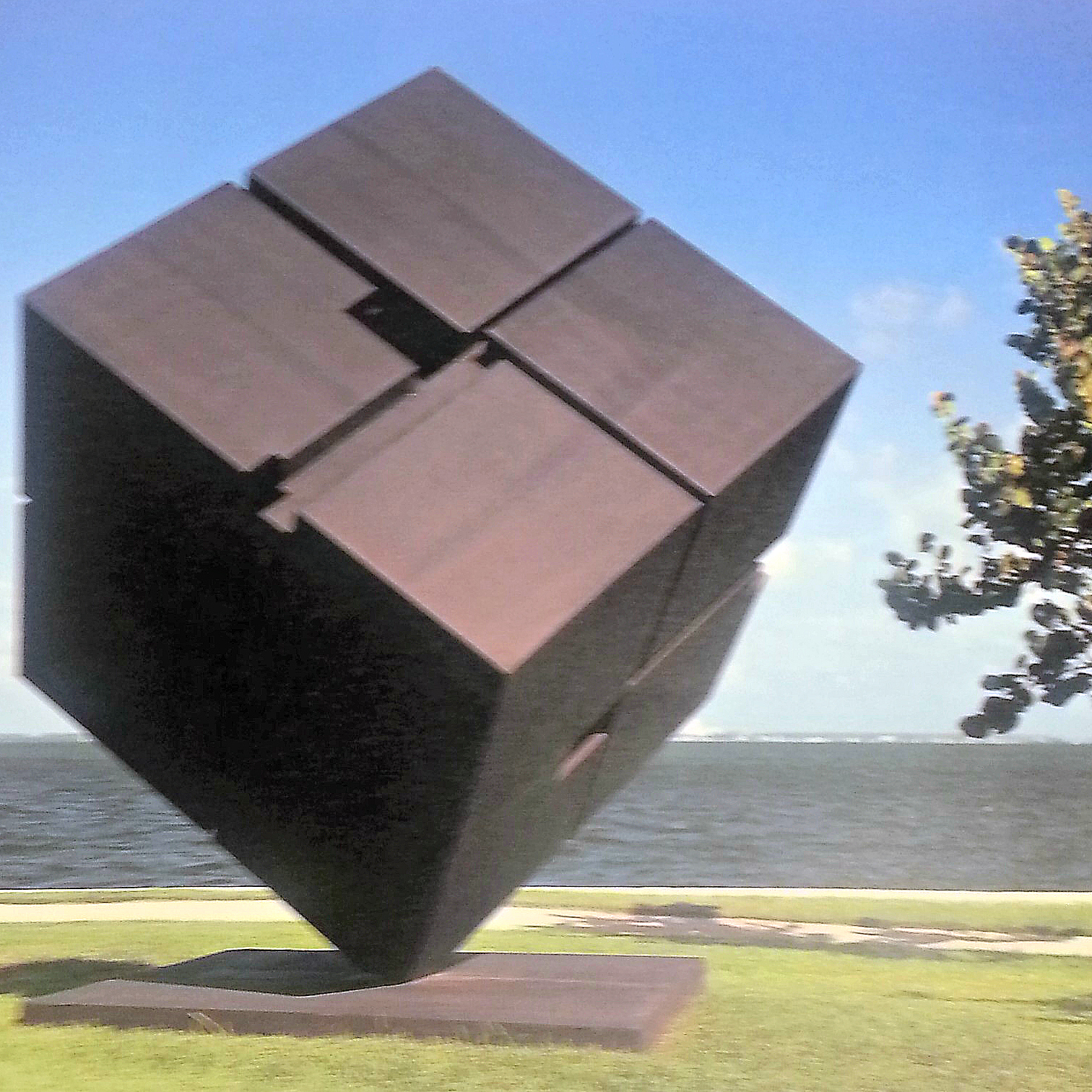
Example of Martin Margulies Grove Isle Gardens sculpture

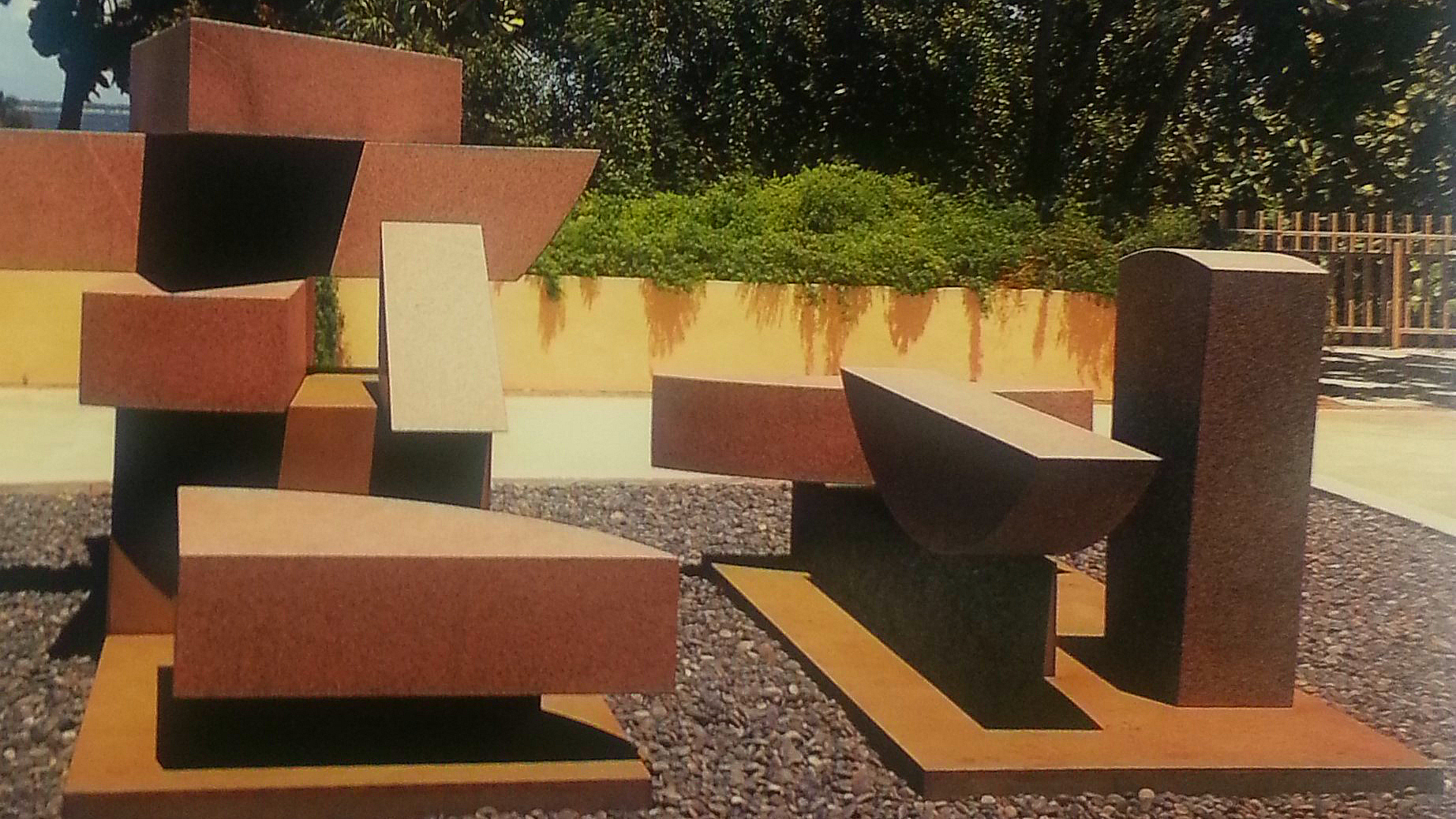
Example of Martin Margulies sculpture deck on Grove Isle

== Links ==
- "Margulies Warehouse"
- Miami New Times
- "Real Estate Developer"
- Grove Isle
