= International Organization for Plant Information =

The International Organization for Plant Information (IOPI) is an international organization founded on September 20, 1991. It runs a series of collaborative international projects aimed at establishing databases of plant classification information and is a committee of the International Union of Biological Sciences.

The Global Plant Checklist was its first objective to provide a list of all plants by merging data from existing sources. This required development of data standards as well as international co-operation, starting in 1993.

Later aims included the Species Plantarum Project to record taxonomic information about all the vascular plants in the world.

Its dataset was later incorporated into the Catalogue of Life.
