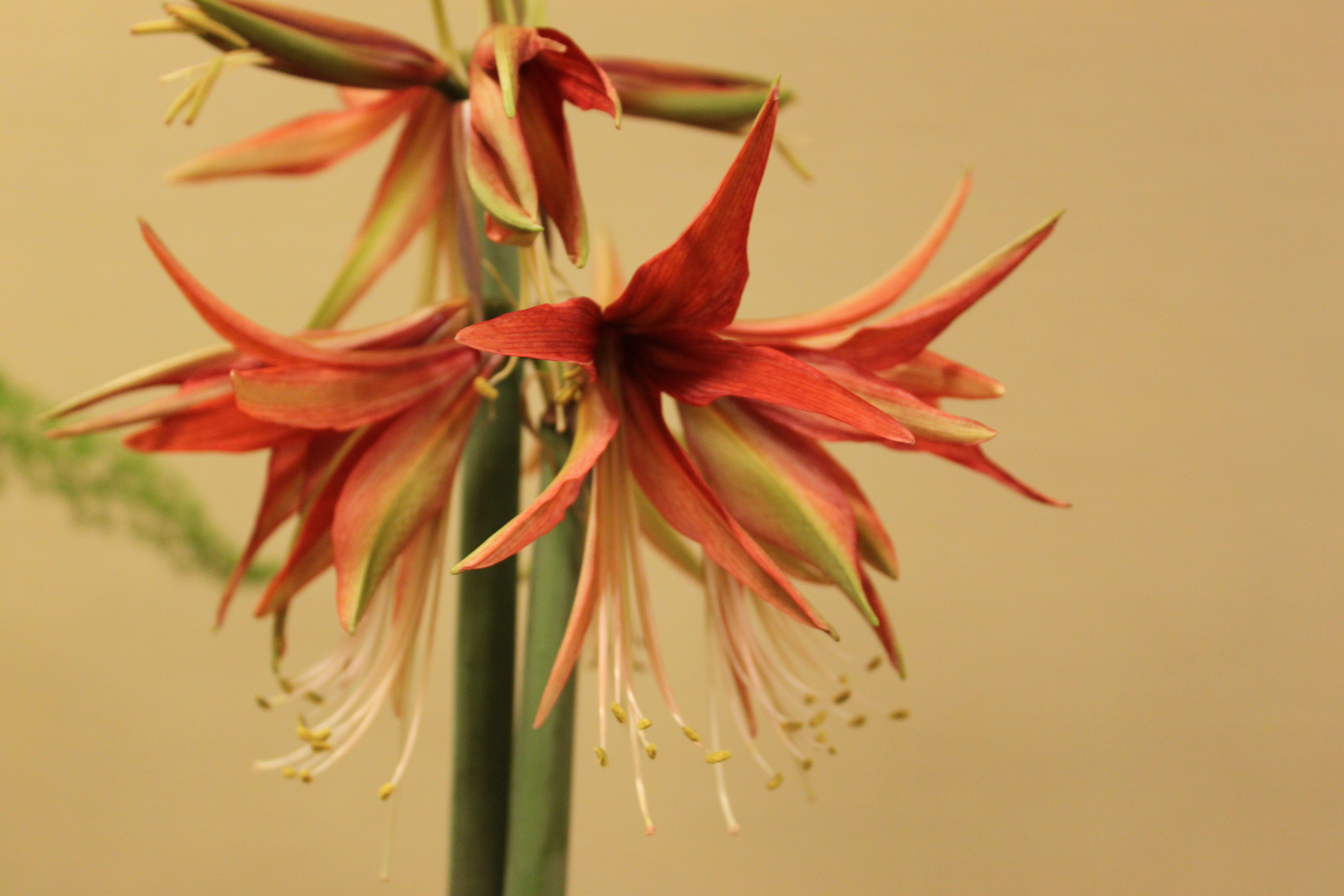
- Hippeastrum cybister

Scientific classification
- Kingdom: Plantae
- Clade: Embryophytes
- Clade: Tracheophytes
- Clade: Angiosperms
- Clade: Monocots
- Order: Asparagales
- Family: Amaryllidaceae
- Subfamily: Amaryllidoideae
- Genus: Hippeastrum
- Subgenus: Omphalissa (Salisb.) Baker

Species
- See article

= Omphalissa =

Unaccepted subgenus of genus Hippeastrum

Omphalissa is an unaccepted subgenus of genus Hippeastrum, within the family Amaryllidaceae. Originally described by Richard Anthony Salisbury in 1866.

== Description ==
Robust habit, two to four large flowers. Perianth with a short tube(< 4 cm), paraperigonium curved closing the throat by a distinct neck. Stigma trifid or capitate, lobes > 2 mm. Spathe slit to the base. Ribbon-like leaves, 2.5 to 5 cm broad. Many dry, flat seeds.

== Taxonomy ==
Salisbury originally described the Omphalissa as a subgroup of the Zephyrantheae, then a tribe within the Amaryllidaceae, in which he included Amaryllis (now Hippeastrum) aulica and A. calyptrata. This was subsequently more formally defined by John Gilbert Baker in 1888, as a subgenus of Hippeastrum with six species. Baker's six species were;

- Hippeastrum aulicum
- Hippeastrum organense (now Hippeastrum correiense)
- Hippeastrum psittacinum
- Hippeastrum calyptratum
- Hippeastrum cybister
- Hippeastrum pardinum

== Ecology ==
Contains the epiphytic species of Hippeastrum.
