= Andrei Nikolayevich Bolkonsky =

Andrei Bolkonsky
- War and Peace character
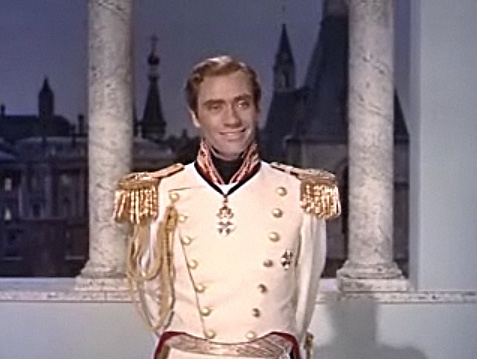
- Mel Ferrer as Andrei in the 1956 film
- Created by: Leo Tolstoy
- Based on: Sergey Volkonsky (possibly)
- Portrayed by: Mel Ferrer; Vyacheslav Tikhonov; Alan Dobie; James Norton; Blake DeLong; Nicholas Belton; Eugene McCoy

In-universe information
- Full name: Andrei Nikolayevich Bolkonsky
- Gender: Male
- Title: Prince
- Family: Nikolay Bolkonsky (father); Maria Bolkonskaya (sister)
- Spouse: Lisa (Liza) Bolkonskaya
- Children: Nikolay Andreyevich Bolkonsky
- Religion: Russian Orthodox
- Nationality: Russian

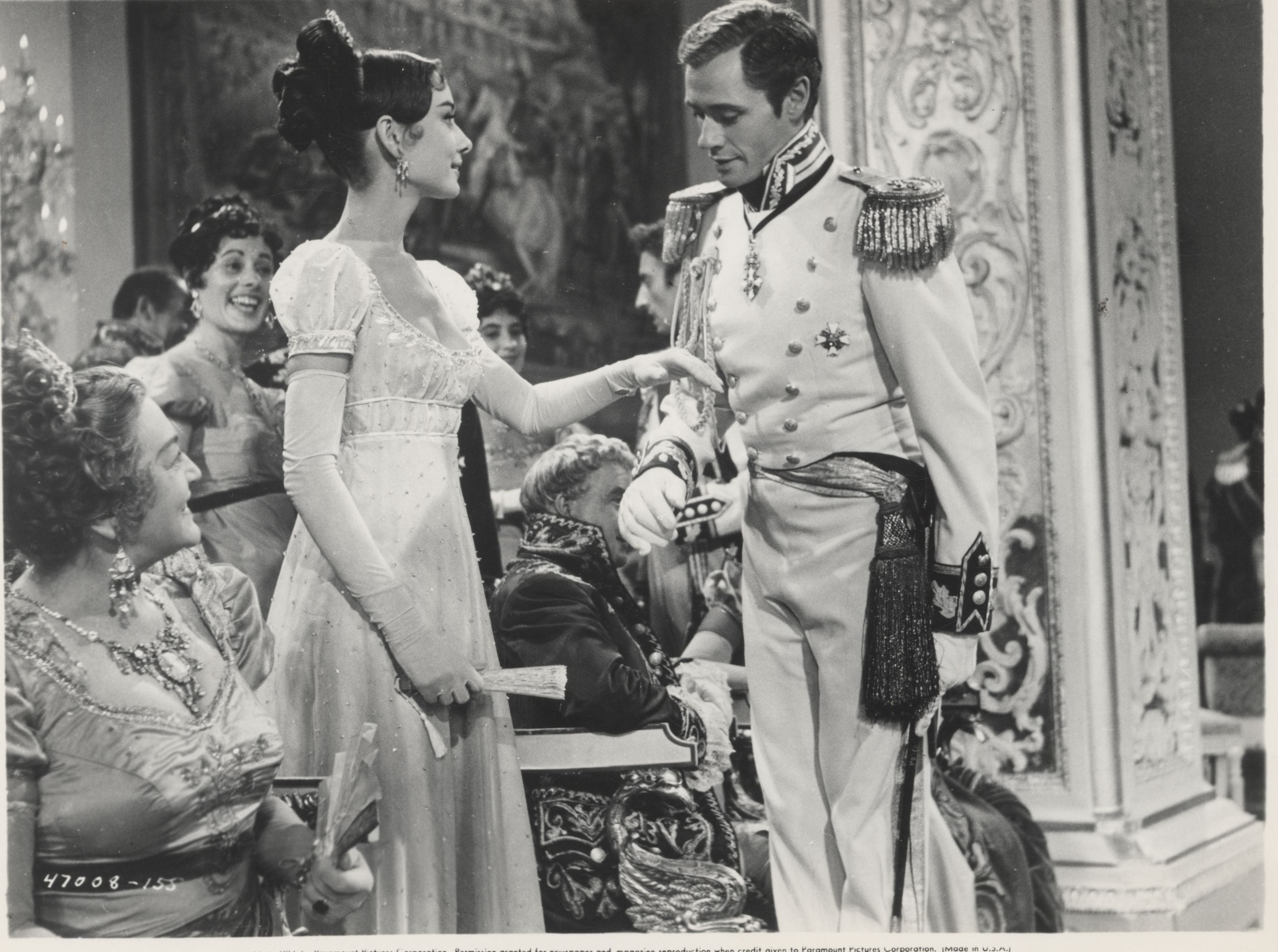
Audrey Hepburn (Natasha) and Mel Ferrer as Andrei in the 1956 film

Prince Andrei Nikolayevich Bolkonsky (Russian: Андрей Николаевич Болконский) is a fictional character in Leo Tolstoy's 1869 novel War and Peace. He is the son of famed Russian general Nikolai Bolkonsky, who raises Andrei and his sister Maria Bolkonskaya on a remote estate. Andrei is best friends with Pierre Bezukhov.

== Title ==
The use of 'prince' in Russian novels is sometimes confusing to an English audience, who are accustomed to 'princes' as the close male relatives of monarchs, or monarchs of small states in their own right. In Eastern Europe, the title knyaz was anciently the chief of a Slavic tribe or ruler of a state; in 19th-century Russia, where War and Peace is set, the title knyaz was similar to, or above, a Western duke or a German Fürst, and it is conventionally translated as 'prince' even though the holder may not be descended from any sovereign. Early in the novel, Andrei is a kniazhich (son of a prince, viz. the knyaz Nikolai Bolkonsky); Andrei becomes a knyaz when his father dies. Both titles are usually translated as 'Prince' in English.

== Possible prototype ==
He is possibly based on Tolstoy's cousin Prince Sergey Volkonsky (1788–1865), who was a hero of the Napoleonic Wars and later a Decembrist. However, the scholar Laura Jepsen's view is that unlike "many of the other characters for whom the author found living prototypes, Prince Andrei is entirely fictitious".

== Life and death ==
At the beginning of the novel, the handsome and intellectual Andrei, disillusioned with married life and finding his wife preoccupied with trivialities, becomes an officer in the Third Coalition against his idol, Napoleon Bonaparte. When he goes to war, he leaves his pregnant wife, Lise, at Bald Hills in the countryside with his father and sister.

Andrei is wounded at the Battle of Austerlitz. He has an epiphany while lying on the battlefield gazing up at the vastness of the blue sky, realising the triviality of human affairs under the immobile eyes of nature and that he has the potential to be happy. Shortly afterwards, Andrei is rescued from the battlefield by Napoleon, who takes a liking to him, although Andrei no longer sees him as a great man but as "...a small, insignificant man compared with what was happening between his soul and this lofty, infinite sky with clouds racing across it...with his petty vanity and joy in victory." However, Prince Andrei is not listed among the dead or the officers taken prisoner, leading his father and sister to assume the worst. Neither inform Lise that he is unaccounted-for, fearing to cause her any anxiety in the final stages of her pregnancy. Andrei arrives, fully recovered, while his wife is in labour and sees her briefly before she dies in childbirth. The child, a boy, survives. Andrei, who, despite everything, had cared deeply for his wife (as he confides later to Pierre), is guilt-stricken and depressed. Completely disillusioned with his former wartime ambitions, Andrei spends the following few years at home, raising his son and serving under his father.

In 1809, Andrei is recalled to Petersburg, where he is formally introduced to Countess Natasha Rostova for the first time. Andrei wishes to marry Natasha, but his father expresses concern: he does not wish to see his son rush into a marriage with a woman half his age, and socially below him. Old Prince Bolkonsky demands that they wait a year before marrying. Andrei proposes marriage to Natasha, who happily accepts, though she is upset by the one-year wait. In the meantime Andrei decides to tour Europe.

In Andrei's absence however, Natasha develops an infatuation with the libertine Prince Anatole Kuragin. She breaks off the engagement with Andrei and plans to elope with Kuragin. Natasha is stopped by her cousin Sonya and Marya Dmitrievna, who suspect Anatole's intentions. They later find out from Pierre Bezukhov that Anatole is already secretly married to a Polish woman.

Andrei wants to take revenge on Kuragin, who flees after Pierre warns him. Not having found Kuragin and in the light of Napoleon's 1812 invasion, he decides to join the army again. When Kutuzov is appointed commander-in-chief, he offers Andrei a position in his personal staff. Andrei declines as he is a well-liked regimental commander, considering his role there to be more important than what he could possibly accomplish as a staff officer.

During the Battle of Borodino he is hit by an exploding shell and seriously wounded in the stomach. While in agony, he sees Anatole, whose leg is amputated due to war wounds, and realizes that he has the capability to forgive both Anatole and Natasha, and that he still loves her. He is driven back to Moscow, where Sonya (Natasha's cousin) notices him when the Rostovs are helping transport wounded soldiers. Eventually, Natasha discovers him, and they are reunited. She tries to nurse him back to health. Although Prince Andrei's wounds begin to heal and health slowly returns, he eventually loses the will to live and dies in Natasha and Marya's care.

== Character development ==
Prince Andrei is one of the most elaborated personages in the novel, together with Count Pierre Bezukhov, to whom he serves as a philosophical opposite. He is introduced as a slightly cynical character, disillusioned in his marriage by what he sees as the simple-mindedness of his wife. He is depicted as an atheist, skeptical of his sister Marya's strong religious beliefs.

Andrei enlists in the army and desperately tries to reach a high rank because he believes history is made at the top of command. He often dreams of being in command of the army and wishes he could make his imaginative plans become a reality. Andrei is shown to have great respect for Napoleon, as his view on historic events being the will of a few important people is embodied best by Napoleon. While lying wounded on the Austerlitz battlefield, Andrei meets Napoleon and realizes the nature of his hero, who is excited by the carnage on the battlefield. He loses his belief in the importance of single personages compared to the whole world.

After his return home and the death of his wife, Andrei becomes more cynical, losing his interest in war and politics. The Battle of Austerlitz made him see the chaos in war, and the inability of even the great figures of history to change the course of events. Focusing completely on the education of his son, he only enters public service under his father because the latter wished so. A visit by Pierre Bezukhov, who recently joined the Freemasons and attempts to explain his philosophies to the pessimistic and disillusioned Andrei, makes Andrei realise that his life is not over yet. Although Pierre's philosophies fail to convince him, he finds joy in his life again.

Andrei regains the will to live and becomes more optimistic. During this period he is also shown to be fairly humanist, he frees his serfs and tries to improve their living conditions under influence of the thoughts Pierre expressed to him. Reflecting on his experiences at Austerlitz, he now becomes convinced that in order to prevent the chaos on the battlefield he experienced, the military code needs to be changed.

After meeting Natasha Rostova, he becomes enchanted with her liveliness, which contrasts with his life after the death of his wife. He proposes to her but his father disapproves, and suggests that Andrei should wait a year and receive treatment abroad for his wound. While Andrei is away, Natasha disgraces herself by attempting to elope with Anatole Kuragin. Andrei is too proud to forgive her.

When back in the army, Andrei realises that his previous visions on historic events were false, that the course of historic events is not decided by the actions of a few, as he thought before Austerlitz, nor by the laws (he tried to change) by which they operate, but by the decisions and actions of every single individual. He adopts the same deterministic view of history that Tolstoy himself expresses in the narrative chapters. For this reason he declines to join Kutuzov's staff to remain in command of his regiment, where he feels his actions are just as important, if not more important, than trying to change the course of events from a distance.

In the hospital at Borodino, Andrei meets Kuragin, on whom he wanted to take revenge. However, seeing the horribly wounded Kuragin's suffering makes him realise the meaning of forgiveness and absolute love. Recovering from his wound, he starts believing that the love he felt for his former enemy Kuragin, is the same love expressed in the Gospels. Following this change, he starts to recover and meets Natasha again, whom he forgives stating he loves her now more than ever. After having a dream that parallels dying with awakening in a new reality, he loses his will to live and dies.

== See also ==
- List of characters in War and Peace
