= Ant colony =

Underground lair where ants live, eat, and tend eggs

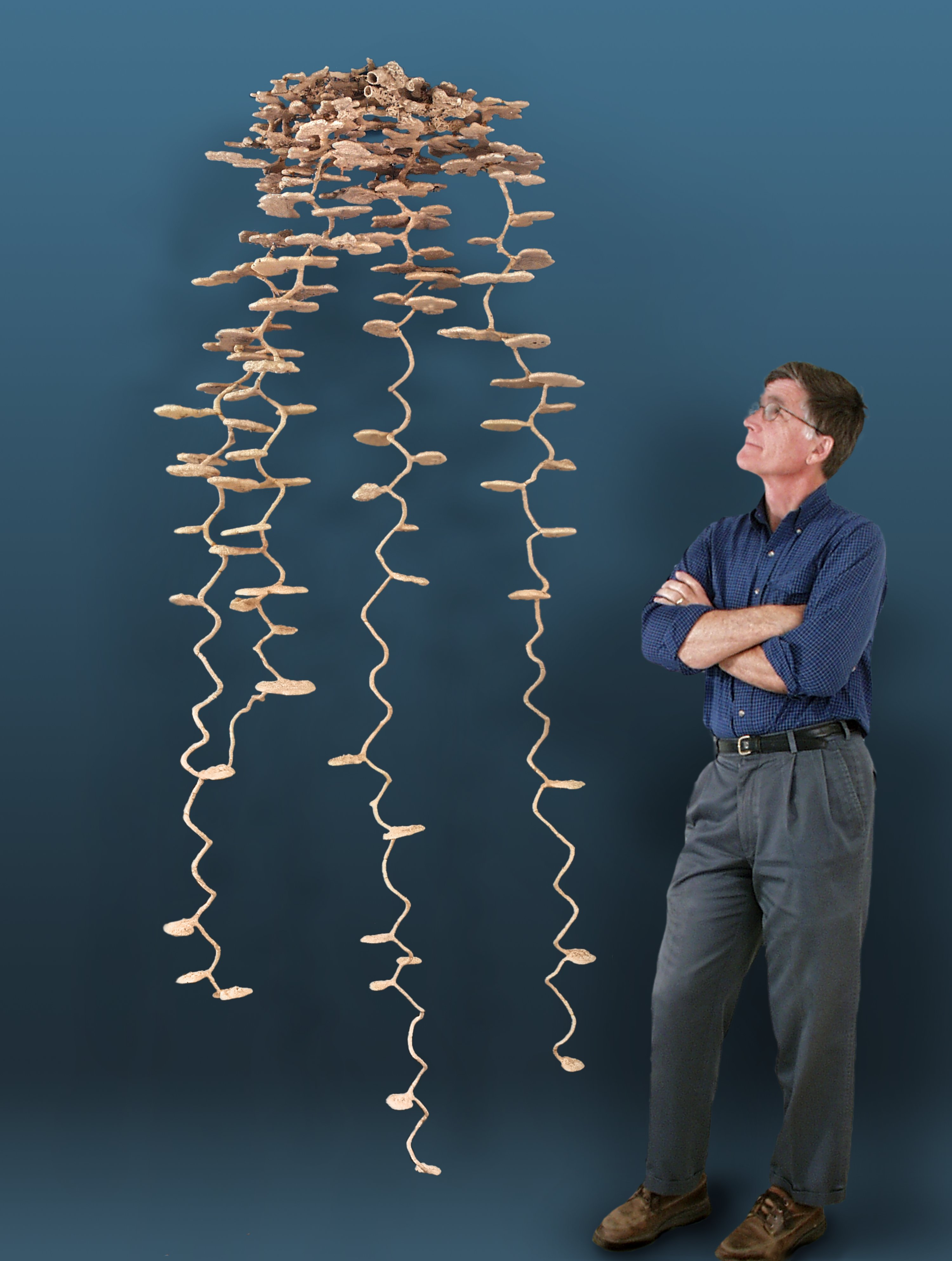
Walter R. Tschinkel next to a plaster cast of a Pogonomyrmex badius nest

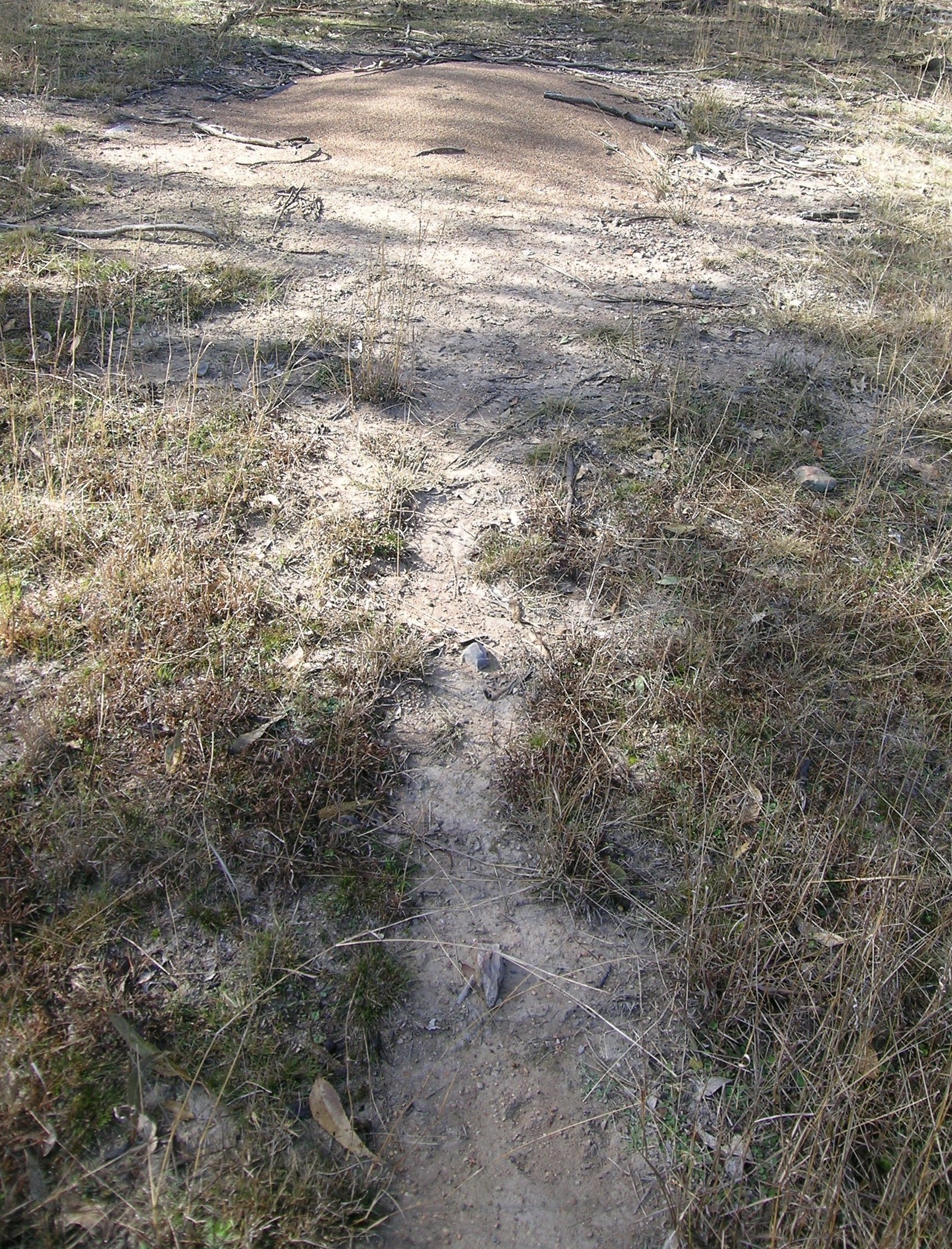
Ant hill and ant tracks, Oxley Wild Rivers National Park, New South Wales

An ant colony is a population of ants, typically from a single species, capable of maintaining their complete lifecycle. Ant colonies are eusocial, communal, and efficiently organized and are very much like those found in other social Hymenoptera, though the various groups of these developed sociality independently through convergent evolution. The typical colony consists of one or more egg-laying queens, numerous sterile females (workers, soldiers) and, seasonally, many winged sexual males and females. In order to establish new colonies, ants undertake flights that occur at species-characteristic times of the day. Swarms of the winged sexuals (known as alates) depart the nest in search of other nests. The males die shortly thereafter, along with most of the females. A small percentage of the females survive to initiate new nests.

== Etymology ==
The term "ant colony" refers to a population of workers, reproductive individuals, and brood that live together, cooperate, and treat one another non-aggressively. Often this comprises the genetically related progeny from a single queen, although this is not universal across ants. The name "ant farm" is commonly given to ant nests that are kept in formicaria, isolated from their natural habitat. These formicaria are made by scientists to study by rearing or temporarily maintaining them. Another name is "formicary", which derives from the Medieval Latin word formīcārium. The word also derives from formica. "Ant nests" are the physical spaces in which the ants live. These can be underground, in trees, under rocks, or even inside a single acorn. The name "anthill" (or "ant hill") applies to aboveground nests where the workers pile sand or soil outside the entrance, forming a large mound. However in English usage in Africa and Australia, "anthill", "ant hill" or "ant-hill" is used informally for the more prominent structures built by mound-building termites, for which 'termite mound' is the more scientifically accurate term.

== Colony size ==
Colony size (the number of individuals that make up the colony) is very important to ants: it can affect how they forage, how they defend their nests, how they mate, and even their physical appearances. Body size is often seen as the most important factor in shaping the natural history of non-colonial organisms; similarly, colony size is key in influencing how colonial organisms are collectively organized. Colonies have a significant range of sizes: some are just several ants living in a twig, while others are super-colonies with many millions of workers. Within a single ant colony, seasonal variation may be huge. For example, in the ant Dolichoderus mariae, one colony can shift from around 300 workers in the summer to over 2,000 workers per queen in the winter. Genetics and environmental factors can cause the variation among different colonies of a single species to be even bigger. Different ant species, even those in the same genus, may have enormous colony size disparities: Formica yessensis has colony sizes that are reported to be 306 million workers while Formica fusca colonies sometimes comprise only 500 workers.

== Supercolonies ==
A supercolony occurs when many ant colonies over a large area unite. They still continue to recognize genetic differences in order to mate, but the different colonies within the super colony avoid aggression. Until 2000, the largest known ant supercolony was on the Ishikari coast of Hokkaidō, Japan. The colony was estimated to contain 306 million worker ants and one million queen ants living in 45,000 nests interconnected by underground passages over an area of 2.7 km^{2} (670 acres). In 2000, an enormous supercolony of Argentine ants was found in Southern Europe (report published in 2002). Of 33 ant populations nested along the 6,004-kilometre (3,731 mi) stretch along the Mediterranean and Atlantic coasts in Southern Europe, 30 belonged to one supercolony with estimated millions of nests and billions of workers, interspersed with three populations of another supercolony. The researchers claim that this case of unicoloniality cannot be explained by loss of their genetic diversity due to the genetic bottleneck of the imported ants. In 2009, it was demonstrated that the largest Japanese, Californian and European Argentine ant supercolonies were in fact part of a single global "megacolony". Because of this there is little doubt that the Argentine intercontinental super colony represents the most populous known animal society.

Another supercolony, measuring approximately 100 km (62 mi) wide, was found beneath Melbourne, Australia in 2004.

== Organizational terminology ==
The following terminology is commonly used among myrmecologists to describe the behaviors demonstrated by ants when founding and organizing colonies:

Monogyny
Establishment of an ant colony under a single egg-laying queen.
Polygyny
Establishment of an ant colony under multiple egg-laying queens.
Oligogyny
Establishment of a polygynous colony where the multiple egg-laying queens remain far apart from one another in the nest.
Haplometrosis
Establishment of a colony by a single queen.
Pleometrosis
Establishment of a colony by multiple queens.
Monodomy
Establishment of a colony at a single nest site.
Polydomy
Establishment of a colony across multiple nest sites.

== Colony structure ==
Ant colonies have a complex social structure. Ants' jobs are determined and can be changed by age. As ants grow older their jobs move them farther from the queen, or center of the colony. Younger ants work within the nest protecting the queen and young. Sometimes, a queen is not present and is replaced by egg-laying workers. These worker ants can only lay haploid eggs producing sterile offspring. Despite the title of queen, she does not delegate the tasks to the worker ants; however, the ants choose their tasks based on individual preference. Ants as a colony also work as a collective "super mind". Ants can compare areas and solve complex problems by using information gained by each member of the colony to find the best nesting site or to find food. Some social-parasitic species of ants, known as the slave-making ant, raid and steal larvae from neighboring colonies.

== Communication ==
Since ant colonies can range from a few dozen to millions of ants, communication between ants is highly important. Because of this, ants have been known to communicate through something called odor trails or pheromone trails. These pheromone or odor trails are secreted by certain glands on an ant's body, though these glands and where they are located differ for each species. Using pheromone trails, ants are able to provide positive and negative feedback, which is why ants are typically seen traveling in a single file from point A to point B. When a foraging ant is successful in finding food, they will deposit their pheromone trail on the way back to their nest. The pheromone trail will get stronger as more ants tread it, signaling that there is still food available in that area. This is known as positive feedback. On the other hand, once all the food has been scavenged, returning ants will no longer deposit their pheromones. The trail will then lose its strength as the previous pheromones evaporate, creating negative feedback.

Some ants, like the pharaoh ant, are known to use multiple pheromones to communicate different meanings, like secreting an attractive pheromone trail for rewarding routes or a repellent "no-entry" trail for unrewarding routes. Pharaoh ants are also able to create short-lived and long-lived pheromone trails. Long-lived pheromone trails, lasting for up to several days, act as reminders for ants to check certain trails often due to the success rate of finding food. The short-lived trails, lasting for approximately 20 minutes, can be attractive or repellent, either reinforcing current paths to food sources or discouraging unrewarding branches found on preexisting reward trails.

Pheromone communication isn't only used for foraging, but also to send alarms. For example, the Atta leafcutter ant possesses a different blend of pheromones to signal nearby dangers. Vibrations are another form of communication used by certain ants, like carpenter ants. Carpenter ants are able to create vibrations by smacking their heads and abdomens against the chambers and galleries they've carved out in rotten wood or stumps. These vibrations act as an alarm system warning of danger that can be perceived by their nest mates twenty or more centimeters away.

== Aggression between colonies ==
Aggression between ants can vary depending on the relationship between their colonies. The aggression levels in ants can increase when colonies are in close proximity to each other due to limited resources. Variation in size can also affect aggression levels as when a larger ant species encounters a smaller ant species, they are more likely to raid or destroy their smaller competition. If conflicts were to arise between two colonies, then the losing colony would either retreat or be completely destroyed.

It is common for ants to engage in battle with ants from different colonies, but uncommon for conflict to arise between ants in the same colony. Cardiocondyla ants are an exception because of their ability to produce wingless males, creating the opportunity for these males to mate with the queen ants that inhabit the nest without having to leave the nest like other ant species. The competition to mate is thus increased as there are more available males. The wingless males typically fight to the death until only one remains in the colony. These wingless males are born with stronger mandibles than other winged males in order to give them a fighting chance at being the last remaining male in the colony so that they may be able to mate and reproduce.

== Mutualistic relationships ==
Collecting food for a colony can be difficult as forage workers must be able to provide food that satisfies their own "nutritional requirements while also addressing the nutritional needs of the other members of the colony, including the queen, the larvae, and the other workers". Because of this these ants have been known to form mutualistic interaction with different species like the mutualistic interaction between ants and hemipterans. Ants protect the hemipterans, a tree bug from predators and in turn the hemipterans provide honeydew which is rich in carbohydrates and have been seen to increase an ants activity, aggressiveness, population size, and dominance of ants within a community.

Another mutualistic relationship is the relationship between ants and fungal hyphae. The worker ants of an African crematogaster species build small shelters for the hemipterans using chewed wood and use fungal hyphae to strengthen the structure. Fungal hyphae like chaetothyriales and capnodiales are also often used in the structural construction of ant colonies because as these fungi age they leave behind resistant tube-shaped cell walls ensuring these colonies will have sturdy walls even long after these fungi have died.

== Excavation ==
Ant hill art is a growing collecting hobby. It involves pouring molten metal (typically non-toxic zinc or aluminum), plaster or cement down an ant colony mound acting as a mold and upon hardening, one excavates the resulting structure. In some cases, this involves a great deal of digging.

The casts are often used for research and education purposes, but many are simply given or sold to natural history museums, or sold as folk art or as souvenirs. Walter R. Tschinkel notes in Ant Architecture: The Wonder, Beauty, and Science of Underground Nests that many commercial operations seem to use a casting procedure he developed and published based on the work of Brazilian myrmecologists Meinhard Jacoby and Luiz Forti. Usually, the hills are chosen after the ants have abandoned so as to not kill any ants; however in the Southeast United States, pouring casting into an active colony of invasive fire ants is a novel way to eliminate them.

== Ant-beds ==
Nest construction of ants

An ant-bed, in its simplest form, is a pile of soil, sand, pine needles, or clay or a composite of these and other materials that build up at the entrances of the subterranean dwellings of ant colonies as they are excavated. A colony is built and maintained by legions of worker ants, who carry tiny bits of dirt and pebbles in their mandibles and deposit them near the exit of the colony. They normally deposit the dirt or vegetation at the top of the hill to prevent it from sliding back into the colony, but in some species, they actively sculpt the materials into specific shapes and may create nest chambers within the mound.

== See also ==
- Ant colony optimization, a technique in computer science inspired by ant colonies
- Nuno sa punso, a Filipino belief about ant hills
