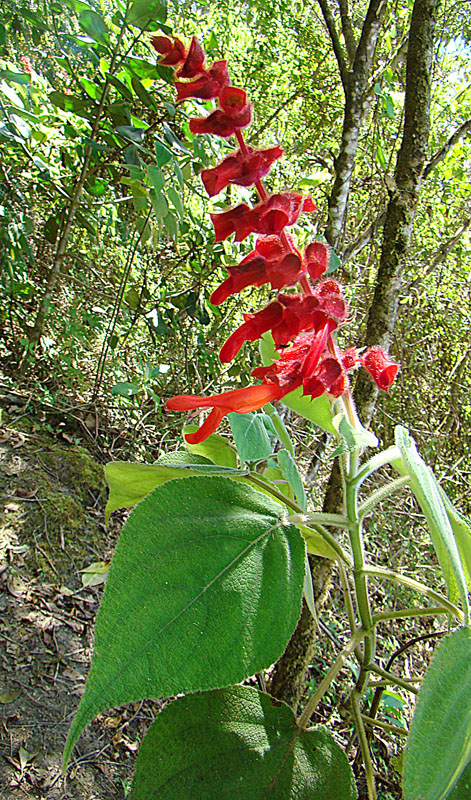

Scientific classification
- Kingdom: Plantae
- Clade: Tracheophytes
- Clade: Angiosperms
- Clade: Eudicots
- Clade: Asterids
- Order: Lamiales
- Family: Lamiaceae
- Genus: Salvia
- Species: S. libanensis

Binomial name
- Salvia libanensis Rusby

= Salvia libanensis =

Species of shrub

Salvia libanensis is a perennial shrub that is endemic to the northwestern slopes of the Sierra Nevada de Santa Marta in Colombia, growing at elevations between 2,000 to 2,200 m (6,600 to 7,200 ft). S. libanensis is a vigorous and spectacular plant reaching 3 m (9.8 ft) tall, with ovate leaves that are 7 to 12 cm (2.8 to 4.7 in) long and 3 to 8 cm (1.2 to 3.1 in) wide, hairy on both surfaces, with a paler underside. The inflorescence is of terminal racemes, with a 6 cm (2.4 in) red corolla.
