= Myrmecological News =

- Discipline: Myrmecology
- Language: English, German
- Edited by: Florian Steiner, Birgit Schlick-Steiner, Daniel Kronauer

Publication details
- Publisher: Austrian Society of Entomofaunistics (Austria)
- Frequency: Continuous

Standard abbreviations
- ISO 4: Myrmecol. News

Indexing
- ISSN: 1994-4136 (print); 1997-3500 (web)

Links
- Journal homepage

Myrmecological News (previous name: Myrmecologische Nachrichten) is an independent, international, non-profit, peer-reviewed, open-access scientific journal devoted to all aspects of ant research. In a mix of research and review articles, all fields of myrmecology are covered.

It was relaunched in 2004.

== Publisher ==
The Austrian Society of Entomofaunistics (ÖGEF) is a scientific non-profit organisation promoting entomofaunistic research, with a geographic emphasis on Austria and the Palaearctic. Other publications: Beiträge zur Entomofaunistik.

== Abstracting and indexing ==
Myrmecological News is indexed and abstracted in the Web of Science (Impact Factor 2011: 2.644, Rank 5/85 in category Entomology), The Zoological Record, Scopus, and Google Scholar.
