= Orland Emile White =

American botanist

- Education: South Dakota State University; Harvard University
- Scientific career
- Thesis: Studies of teratological phenomena in their relation to evolution and the problems of heredity (1913)
- Doctoral students: Margaret Menzel

Orland Emile White (1885–1972) was a plant geneticist who traveled to the Amazon basin on the Mulford Expedition. He served as the first director of the University of Virginia's research field station, Blandy Experimental Farm, and his research plantings developed into what is now the State Arboretum of Virginia, also known as the Orland E. White Research Arboretum in Virginia.

A collection of his papers (3300 items) is at the University of Virginia Library
