= Lichgate on High Road =

Historic house in Florida, United States

- U.S. National Register of Historic Places
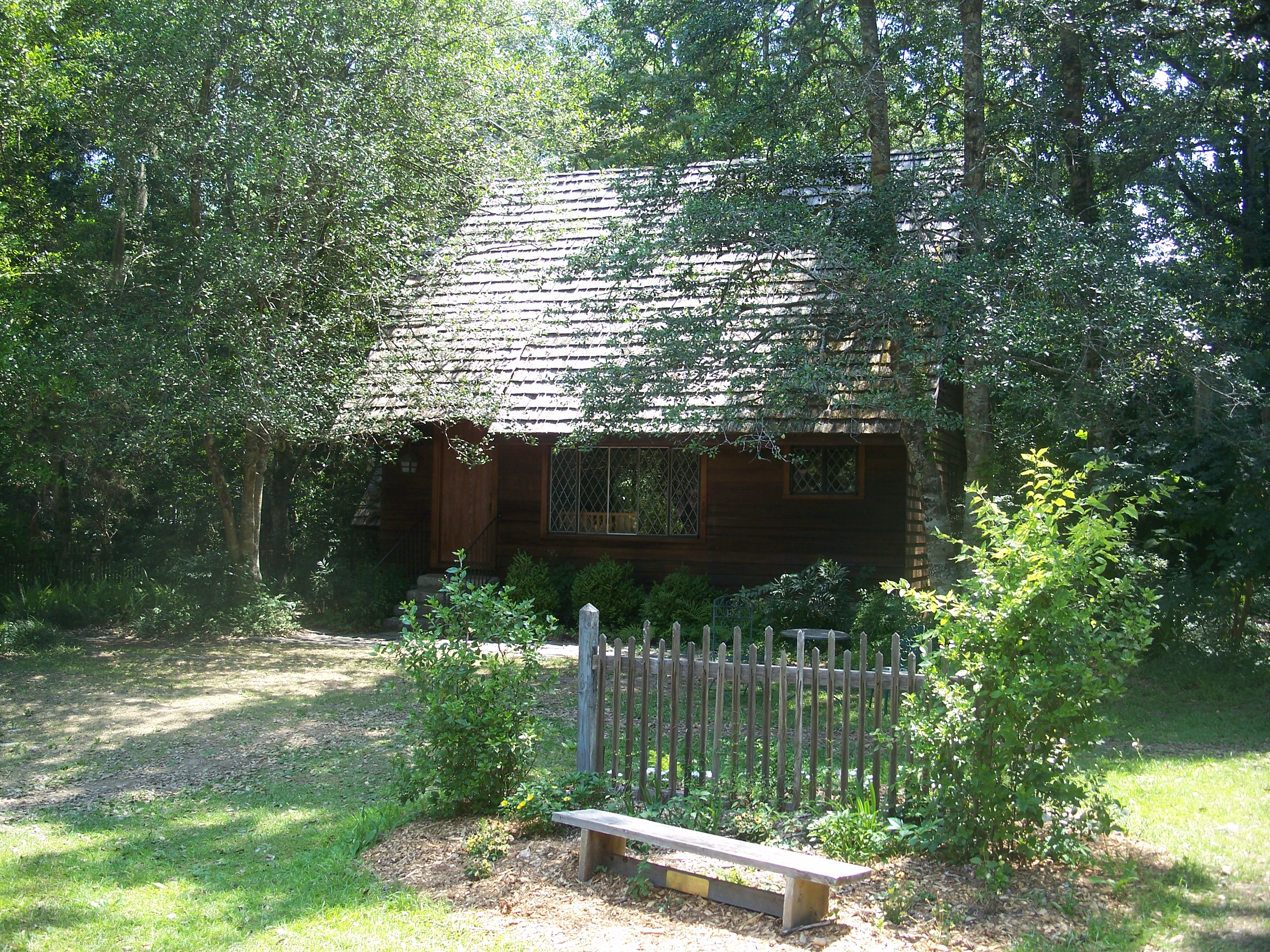

- Location within Florida
- Location: Tallahassee, Florida, United States
- Coordinates: 30°27′37″N 84°18′43″W
- NRHP reference No.: 06000211
- Added to NRHP: March 31, 2006

The Lichgate on High Road is a site in Tallahassee, Florida. It is located at 1401 High Road. On March 31, 2006, it was added to the U.S. National Register of Historic Places.

== History ==
The Lichgate cottage was the home of the late Laura Jepsen, a professor of comparative literature at Florida State University from 1946 to 1978.

Jepsen purchased the property on which the cottage now stands in 1955 from a group of individuals representing the Capital City Free Will Baptist Church. This Church was never established but the sale of the property included covenants preventing development for 25 years after the sale.

Jepsen drew inspiration for the design of her cottage from many different sources. The primary source was the appearance of the Earl Gresh Wood Parade Museum located in St. Petersburg, FL. Jepsen even refers to the Wood Parade home in her final book called Lichgate on High Road, writing, "It occurred to me that it might not be impossible to move a small house from St. Petersburg, Florida, to a site in Tallahassee...The little house, constructed by the builders of a museum to display woods of various trees in the world, was, like its neighbor, a model of Tudor architecture, with the steep roof cut away over doors and windows to represent the rood of a thatched cottage and with the tall chimney surmounted by a chimney pot."

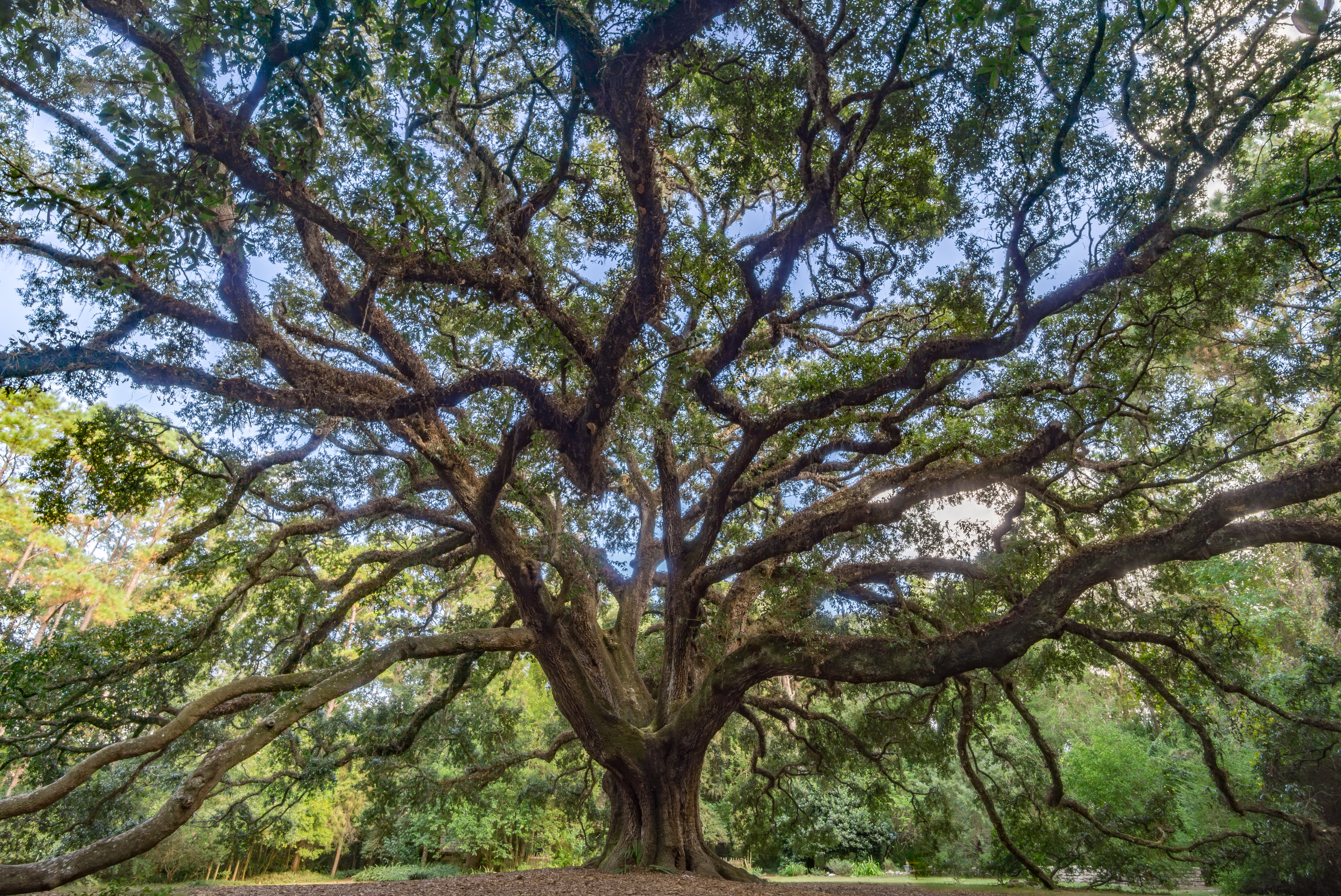
Large live oak tree in front of the Lichgate cottage.

After her death on Christmas Eve, 1995, Lichgate and other properties owned by Jepsen were given to The Nature Conservancy and by August 1997, a small group had come forward to assume care of the property. This group was the Laura Jepsen Institute Inc. which was established by a former student, friends, and acquaintances, inspired by her life's work. The property is open to the public and small groups. Features include a large live oak tree, a Tudor-style fairy-tale cottage, and gardens.
