= Ant Architecture: The Wonder, Beauty, and Science of Underground Nests =

2021 book by Walter R. Tschinkel

- Author: Walter R. Tschinkel
- Language: English
- Subject: Ants, ant colonies, nest architecture, natural history
- Genre: Non-fiction
- Publisher: Princeton University Press
- Publication date: June 22, 2021 (Hardcover)
- Publication place: United States
- Pages: 248
- Awards: PROSE Awards in Biological Sciences (2022)
- ISBN: 9780691179315

Ant Architecture: The Wonder, Beauty, and Science of Underground Nests is a 2021 book by American biologist Walter R. Tschinkel that explores the world of underground ant nests. Drawing from his research on ant colonies, Tschinkel who is known as the creator of the field of underground ant nest architecture research, provides an in-depth look at the architectural and biological complexity of ant nests and the innovative methods used to study them. He documents how he casts ant nests with plaster, molten metal, or wax, then excavates them and analyzes their structure. The book also discusses the functional and environmental significance of these nests, and poses critical questions about ant behavior and the role of architecture in their colonies. The work won the 2022 PROSE Award in Biological Sciences from the Association of American Publishers.

== Background ==
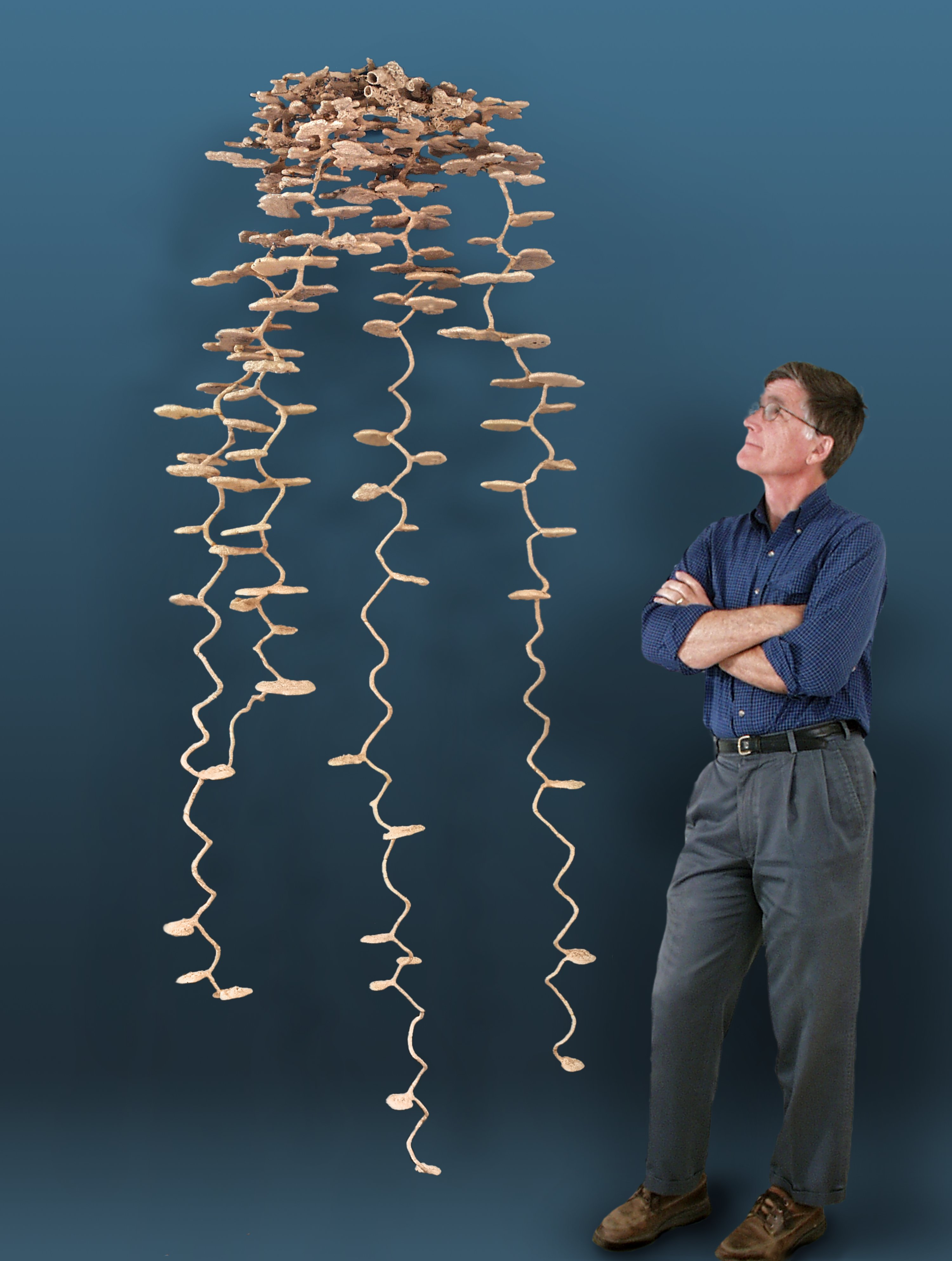
Tschinkel standing next to a plaster cast of a Pogonomyrmex badius.

Initially an experimental biologist observing ants' behavior above ground or in the laboratory, Tschinkel became deeply invested in understanding the architectural complexity of their subterranean homes, which became "almost an obsession." Tschinkel, professor emeritus of biological science at Florida State University, has spent over fifty years studying ant behavior, focusing much of his research on their underground nests later in his career. His methods, such as casting ant nests in plaster and molten metal, helped reveal the intricate beauty and functional complexity of these underground structures, shaping the foundation for Ant Architecture.

In a 2021 interview with Adrian Smith of Ant Lab, (Note: Ant Lab is the YouTube channel for the Evolutionary Biology & Behavior Research Lab, a collaborative initiative between the North Carolina Museum of Natural Sciences and North Carolina State University. Led by Adrian Smith, the channel features videos primarily produced by him.) Tschinkel discussed his work in ant nest architecture, a field he created through the innovative use of casting techniques to study underground ant colonies. Inspired by a paper he read that described the use of dental plaster for making partial nest casts, Tschinkel experimented with the material himself and made his first cast of a fire ant nest, which revealed an unexpectedly intricate structure: "I was really surprised because it turned out that I hadn’t envisioned it right at all." He later transitioned to using molten metal for casting, allowing for more complete and durable replicas of nests. He developed methods for melting aluminum or zinc in the field, using an insulated garbage can fired with charcoal. Reflecting on his decades of research, Tschinkel noted, "Once I saw what the underground chambers were like... I saw that that was something really special," underlining both the scientific and artistic significance of his discoveries.

== Overview ==
Tschinkel studies the complex underground nests built by ants through innovative methods he developed. These techniques include filling them with plaster, molten metal, or wax to create casts, which are then excavated to reveal their structure. It also includes the careful mapping of nests during excavation, collecting and censusing the contents of all chambers to reveal the vertical distribution of nest contents. Tschinkel uses these casts and censuses to guide readers through the chambers and architecture of various ant species' nests, offering insights into how the nests are built and how they influence ant colony behavior and the surrounding environment.

The book discusses the diversity of nest designs across different species, exploring questions of how architectural differences might have evolved, and whether ants follow specific "architectural plans." A central theme is the concept of the “superorganism” to describe an ant colony with its many regulatory and reproductive processes, including its division of labor, life cycle, and the creation of its nest. The impact of nest architecture on ecosystems through soil movement is revealed, as is the process of creating a new nest and moving into it.

Tschinkel also reflects on the aesthetics of these natural structures and the broader implications of his research for scientific discovery. Ant Architecture also highlights the value of using simple, problem-solving, cost-effective methods in scientific research, while addressing unresolved questions in the study of ant nest architecture.

Tschinkel has provided metal casts of multiple species of ant nests for display in many natural history (and some art) museums around the world, with about a dozen museums in North America, several in Germany, France, Italy, Netherlands, and one in Hong Kong.

== Reviews ==
In his review, John Longino of the University of Utah praised the author for making complex scientific topics both accessible and engaging. Longino said the book focuses on the relatively unexplored subject of ant nest architecture, emphasizing Tschinkel's inventive methods, such as the use of molten aluminum to cast ant nests. Longino said Tschinkel was able to blend science with storytelling, and noted that his work was both educational and entertaining. He wrote: “Walter takes the time to produce larger synthetic works that are actually entertaining”.

Mark E. Laidre commended the book for its in-depth exploration of the underground nests built by ants. Laidre highlighted Tschinkel's innovative techniques, such as creating molds of ant nests using various substances, which allowed him to uncover the complex structures beneath the surface. Laidre appreciated the combination of rigorous scientific research and engaging personal anecdotes, making the book both informative and entertaining. He emphasized Tschinkel's decades of dedication to studying ant architecture and praised the illustrations and video links that enrich the reader's understanding. Laidre noted that Tschinkel's work not only answered key questions but also raised intriguing new ones about the functions and diversity of ant architecture, saying, “Tschinkel’s studies raise countless questions about the precise functions of ant architecture, as well as the ultimate reasons why architectural diversity exists between different ant species.”

In August 2021, Andrew Robinson listed the book the first in his weekly best science picks for Nature.

Johannes E. Riutta found the castings impressive, stating that they "depict their myriad Myrmecological tunnels and chambers" in a manner suitable for both scientific study and artistic appreciation. He also implied that without these castings, "appreciation of the complexity and true magnificence of the structures" would be challenging, suggesting that the book's appeal might hinge heavily on this visual representation.

Raghavendra Gadagkar praised the book for its remarkable blend of scientific insight and accessible writing. He admired Tschinkel's innovative work in revealing the intricate and often unseen architecture of ant nests, which he cast using molten aluminium. The reviewer highlighted how Tschinkel's process of science, focused on the behavior that produces these nests, invites imitation and inspires future research. He noted, "his efforts have barely scratched the surface," emphasizing the need for more extensive studies across different ant species and regions.

== Awards ==
The book won the 2022 PROSE Award in Biological Sciences.
