= Myrmecology =

Study of ants

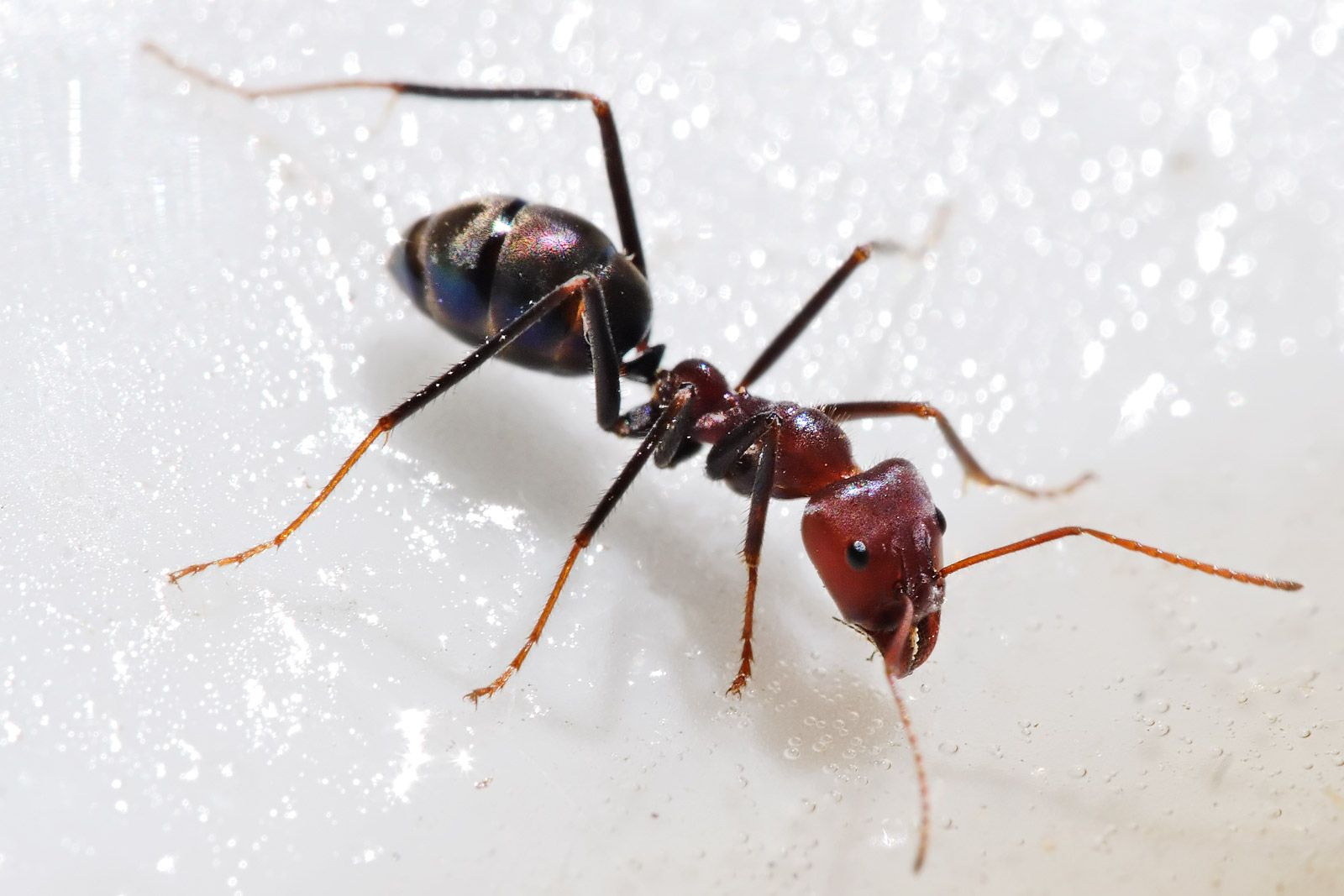
Meat ant (Iridomyrmex purpureus) feeding on honey

Myrmecology (/mɜːrmɪˈkɒlədʒi/; from Greek: μύρμηξ, myrmex, "ant" and λόγος, logos, "study") is a branch of entomology focusing on the study of ants. Ants continue to be a model of choice for the study of questions on the evolution of social systems because of their complex and varied forms of social organization. Their diversity and prominence in ecosystems also has made them important components in the study of biodiversity and conservation. In the 2000s, ant colonies began to be studied and modelled for their relevance in machine learning, complex interactive networks, stochasticity of encounter and interaction networks, parallel computing, and other computing fields.

== History ==
The word myrmecology was coined by William Morton Wheeler (1865–1937), although human interest in the life of ants goes back to ancient times. The earliest scientific thinking based on observation of ant life was that of Auguste Forel (1848–1931), a Swiss psychologist who initially was interested in ideas of instinct, learning, and society. In 1874, he wrote a book on the ants of Switzerland, Les fourmis de la Suisse, and he named his home La Fourmilière (the ant colony). Forel's early studies included attempts to mix species of ants in a colony. He noted polydomy and monodomy in ants and compared them with the structure of nations.

Wheeler looked at ants in a new light, in terms of their social organization, and in 1910, he delivered a lecture at Woods Hole, Massachusetts, on "The Ant-Colony as an Organism", which pioneered the idea of superorganisms. Wheeler considered trophallaxis or the sharing of food within the colony as the core of ant society. This was studied using a dye in the food and observing how it spread in the colony.

Some, such as Horace Donisthorpe, worked on the systematics of ants. This tradition continued in many parts of the world until advances in other aspects of biology were made. The advent of genetics, and ideas in ethology and its evolution, led to new thought. This line of enquiry was pioneered by E. O. Wilson, who founded the field termed as sociobiology.

== Interdisciplinary application ==
Ants often are studied by engineers for biomimicry and by network engineers for more efficient networking. It is not known clearly how ants manage to avoid congestions and how they optimize their movements to move in most efficient ways without a central authority that would send out orders. There already have been many applications in structure design and networking that have been developed from studying ants, but the efficiency of human-created systems is still not close to the efficiency of ant colonies. Furthermore, there are efforts to use ant algorithms and the behavioral strategies of ants in modern management.

== List of notable myrmecologists ==
Alphabetically:

- Thomas Borgmeier (1892–1975), German-Brazilian theologian and entomologist
- Murray S. Blum (1929–2015), American chemical ecologist, an expert on pheromones
- Giovanni Cobelli (1849–1937), Italian entomologist, director of the Rovereto museum
- Walter Cecil Crawley, British entomologist
- William Steel Creighton (1902–1973), American entomologist
- Horace Donisthorpe (1870–1951), British myrmecologist, named several new species
- Carlo Emery (1848–1925), Italian entomologist
- Johan Christian Fabricius (1745–1808), Danish entomologist, student of Linnaeus
- Auguste-Henri Forel (1848–1931), Swiss myrmecologist, studied brain structure of humans and ants
- Émil August Goeldi (1859–1917), Swiss-Brazilian naturalist and zoologist
- William Gould (1715–1799), described by Horace Donisthorpe as "the father of British myrmecology"
- Thomas Caverhill Jerdon (1811–1872), British physician, zoologist and botanist
- Walter Wolfgang Kempf (1920–1976), Brazilian myrmecologist
- Pierre André Latreille (1762–1833) French entomologist
- Sir John Lubbock (the 1st Lord and Baron Avebury) (1834–1913), wrote on hymenoptera sense organs
- Gustav Mayr (1830–1908), Austrian entomologist and professor in Pest and Vienna, specialised in Hymenoptera
- William Nylander (1822–1899), Finnish botanist, biologist, mycologist, entomologist and myrmecologist
- Basil Derek Wragge-Morley (1920–1969), research included genetics, social behaviour of animals, and the behaviour of agricultural pests
- Fergus O'Rourke (1923– 2010), Irish zoologist
- Julius Roger (1819–1865), German physician, entomologist and folklorist
- Felix Santschi (1872–1940), Swiss entomologist
- Theodore Christian Schneirla (1902–1968), American animal psychologist
- Frederick Smith (1805–1879), worked in the zoology department of the British Museum from 1849, specialising in the Hymenoptera
- Roy R. Snelling (1934–2008), American entomologist credited with many important finds of rare or new ant species
- Erich Wasmann (1859–1931), Austrian entomologist
- John Obadiah Westwood (1805–1893), English entomologist and archaeologist also noted for his artistic talents
- William Morton Wheeler (1865–1937), curator of invertebrate zoology in the American Museum of Natural History, described many new species
- Edward Osborne Wilson (1929–2021), Pulitzer Prize winning American myrmecologist, revolutionized the field of sociobiology

=== Contemporary myrmecologists ===
- Barry Bolton, English ant taxonomist
- John S. Clark, Scottish myrmecologist
- Deborah Gordon (1955–), studies ant colony behavior and ecology
- Bert Hölldobler (1936–), Pulitzer Prize winning German myrmecologist
- Laurent Keller (1961–), Swiss evolutionary biologist and myrmecologist
- Mark W. Moffett (1958–), American entomologist and photographer
- Corrie S. Moreau, American evolutionary biologist and entomologist, wrote on evolution and diversification of ants
- Justin Orvel Schmidt, American entomologist, studies the chemical and behavioral defenses of ants, wasps, and arachnids
- Bernhard Seifert, German entomologist
- Walter R. Tschinkel, American myrmecologist

== See also ==
- Ant-keeping
- Bees, Wasps and Ants Recording Society
- Formicarium, also known as ant farm
- Stigmergy, a biological mechanism attributed to the coordination of ants and other social insects
- Myrmecological News, an independent, international, non-profit, scientific journal devoted to ant research
- International Union for the Study of Social Insects
- Ant colony optimization
- Swarm intelligence
