= Mulford Expedition =

Scientific expedition to the Amazon

The Mulford Biological Exploration of the Amazon Basin was a scientific expedition to the Amazon conducted in 1921. It was organized by Henry Hurd Rusby, who at age 64, was a well known explorer, a professor at Columbia University, and a staff member at the New York Botanical Garden. He hired Orland Emile White, a staff member at the Brooklyn Botanic Garden, to assist with collection and handling of plant specimens. The expedition was financed by the H. K. Mulford Company, a pharmaceutical company.

Its mission was to explore the Amazon valley from the headwaters of the Quime River in Bolivia to the mouth of the Amazon River in Brazil. The expedition left La Paz, Bolivia, in July 1921. Rusby was forced to leave the expedition due to neuritis, an infected tooth, and his age; however, White and Martín Cárdenas continued to collect. The expedition lasted eight months, and never reached the Amazon.

== Expedition ==
News from 1921:

Members of the expedition left La Paz, Bolivia, about July 9, whence they proceeded by rail to Eucalyptus, the terminus of the railroad. From Eucalyptus to Pongo they traveled by auto truck over the new auto road recently completed by the Guggenheim interests in Bolivia. From Pongo, a three days' journey by mule brought them to Canamina, which will be their temporary headquarters for three or four weeks. From this point certain members of the party will make an ascent of the La Paz river for a considerable distance for the purpose of making special collections, the remainder of the party making detailed studies in the vicinity of Canamina. Collections have been made in and around Mollendo, Arica, Arequipa, Tiavaya and La Paz. A large quantity of these materials, shipped just before the party left La Paz, has been received in Philadelphia.

The expedition leaves the field in March 1922:

The expedition arrived in Bolivia in July 1921 and began collecting high in the Andes, just south of La Paz. Using balsa-wood rafts, they moved down the Bopi River, stopping for weeks at a time to collect in Huachi and Rurrenabaque. In December, Rusby was forced to leave the expedition due to ill health, traveling alone down the river until he was rescued by a government patrol boat. Before he left, he hired Martín Cárdenas, then a student, to assist with collecting. White and Cárdenas continued collecting in the lowlands of Eastern Bolivia, making extensive collections near Tumupasa, Ixiamas, Lago Rogagua, Ivon, and Cachuela Esperanza. The botanists never reached the Amazon, but headed home from Cachuela Esperanza, Bolivia, in mid-March, 1922, after eight months in the field.

== Results ==
The botanists returned with over 2,400 collections representing more than 1,500 species of plant life. Their collections included a large amount of orchids, termites, economic plants and seeds. Rusby worked through most of the samples himself identifying six new genera and 257 new species. The main collection from the expedition are located at the New York Botanical Garden and at the Brooklyn Botanic Garden.

During the expedition, Gordon MacCreagh wrote a book about its trials and tribulations. White Waters and Black was published in 1923.

== Members ==
- Henry Hurd Rusby, director
- William M. Mann, entomologist
- Orland Emile White, botanist
- Nathan Everett Pearson, ichthyologist
- Walter Duval Brown
- Frederick Ludwig Hoffman
- Gordon MacCreagh
- G. S. McCarty
- Martín Cárdenas

== See also ==
- Search Results: Mulford Expedition at the Smithsonian Institution
