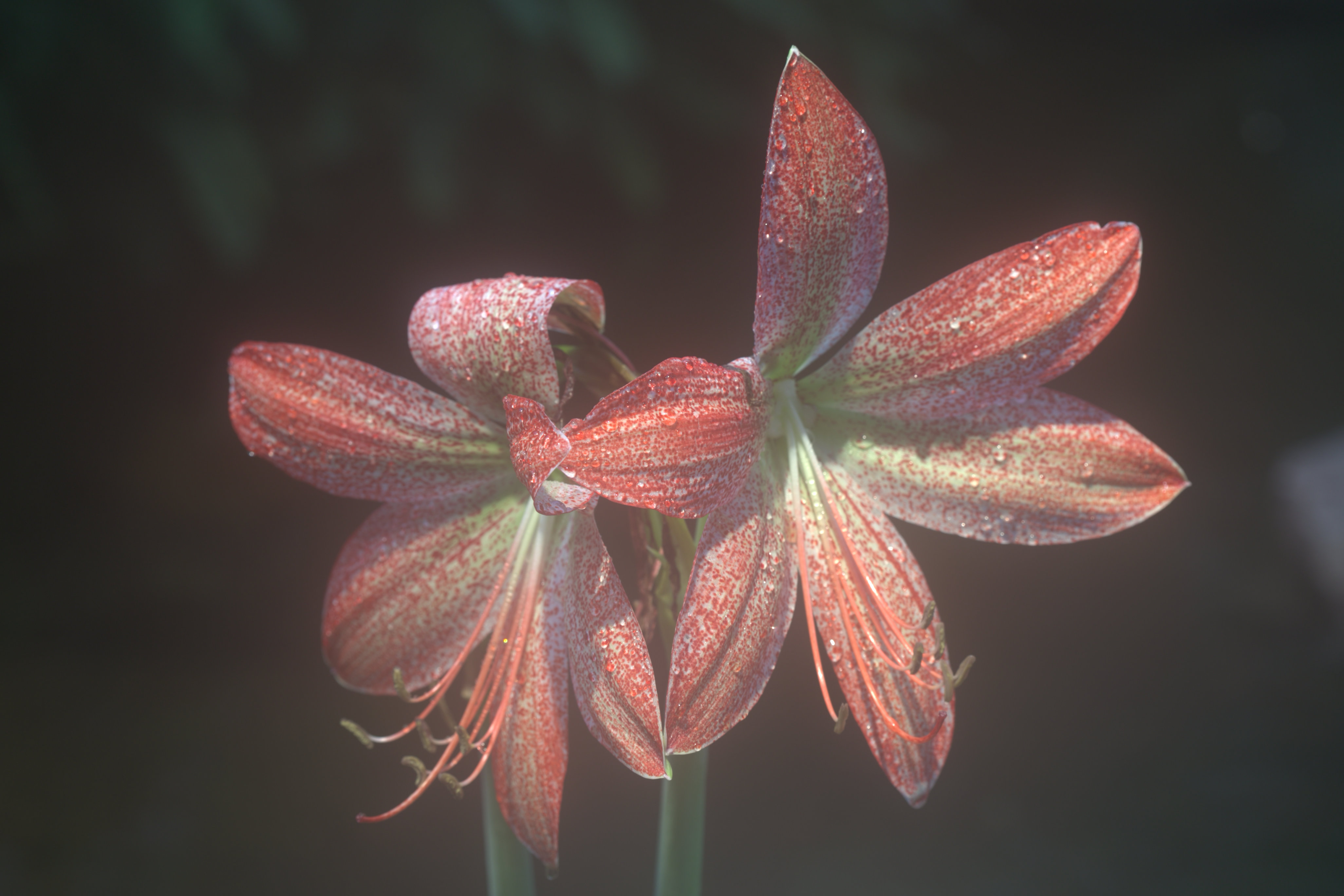
- Hippeastrum pardinum

Scientific classification
- Kingdom: Plantae
- Clade: Tracheophytes
- Clade: Angiosperms
- Clade: Monocots
- Order: Asparagales
- Family: Amaryllidaceae
- Subfamily: Amaryllidoideae
- Genus: Hippeastrum
- Species: H. pardinum

Binomial name
- Hippeastrum pardinum (Hook.f.) Dombrain

Synonyms
- Amaryllis pardina Hook.f.

= Hippeastrum pardinum =

Species of flowering plant

Hippeastrum pardinum is a flowering perennial herbaceous bulbous plant, in the family Amaryllidaceae, from Peru to Bolivia. Originally collected in 1866 by Richard Pearce, it was used in breeding programmes.

== Description ==
Vermilion spots on a yellowish background, resembling a leopard skin. Short or nearly absent flower tube, floral segments broad, recurved and spreading. Flowers 18 cm in diameter.

== Taxonomy ==
Described by Joseph Dalton Hooker in 1867 as Amaryllis, but transferred to Hippeastrum by Henry Honywood Dombrain.

== Images ==
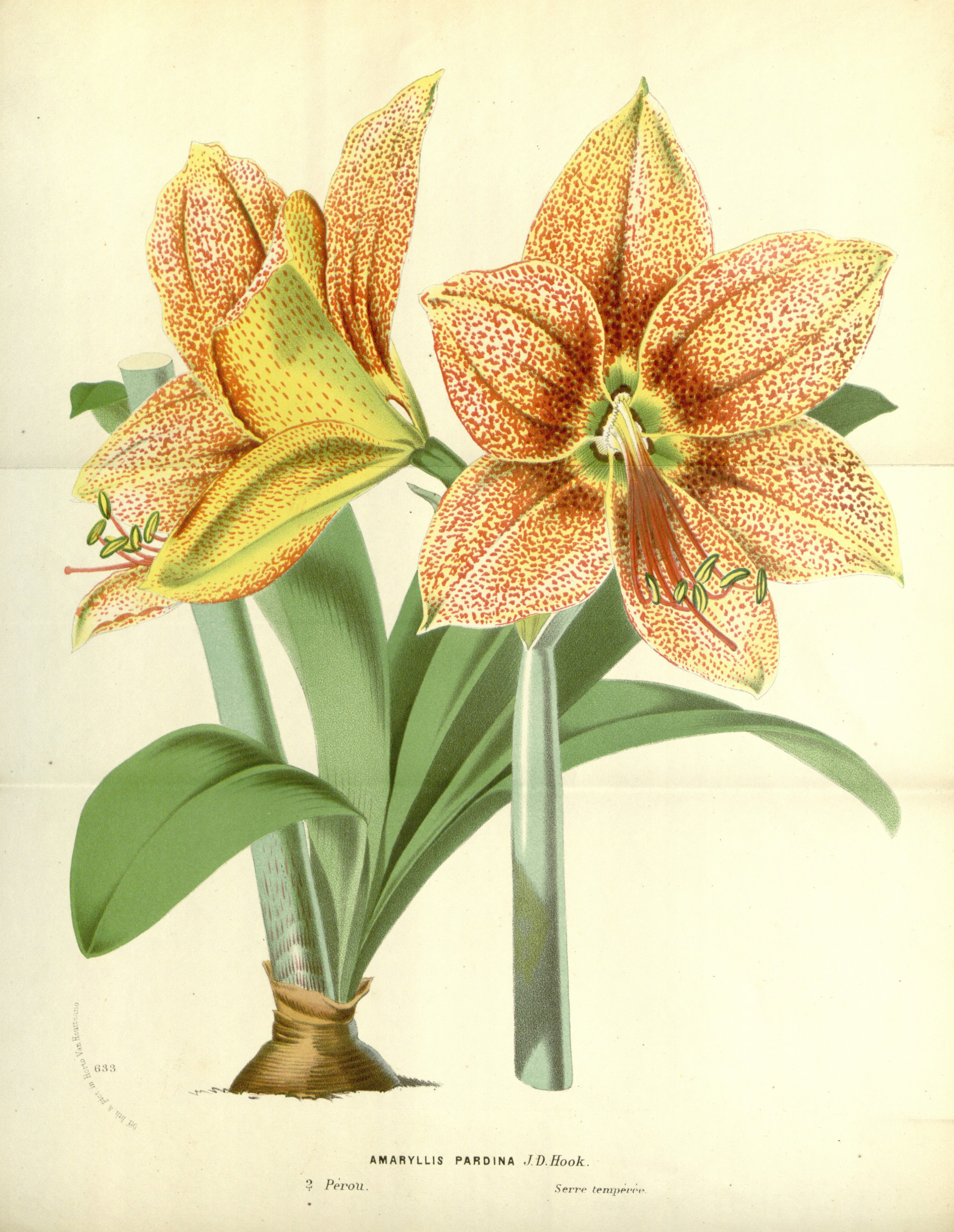
Hippeastrum pardinum

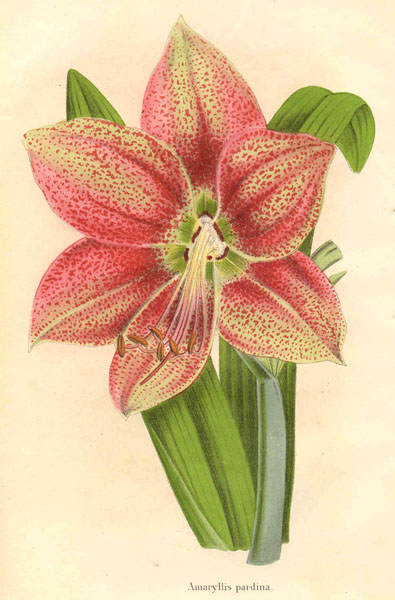

== Sources ==
- The Plant List (2012). "Hippeastrum pardinum".
- GBIF: Hippeastrum pardinum
- "Hippeastrum pardinum". Tropicos. Missouri Botanical Garden.
- International Bulb Society: Hippeastrum pardinum (image)
- Brako, L. & J. L. Zarucchi. 1993. Catalogue of the Flowering Plants and Gymnosperms of Peru. Monogr. Syst. Bot. Missouri Bot. Gard. 45: i–xl, 1–1286.
- Macbride, J. F. 1936. Amaryllidaceae, Flora of Peru. Publ. Field Mus. Nat. Hist., Bot. Ser. 13(1/3): 631–690.
- L'Illustration Horticole. Ghent & Brussels 14:(Misc.) 46. 1867
