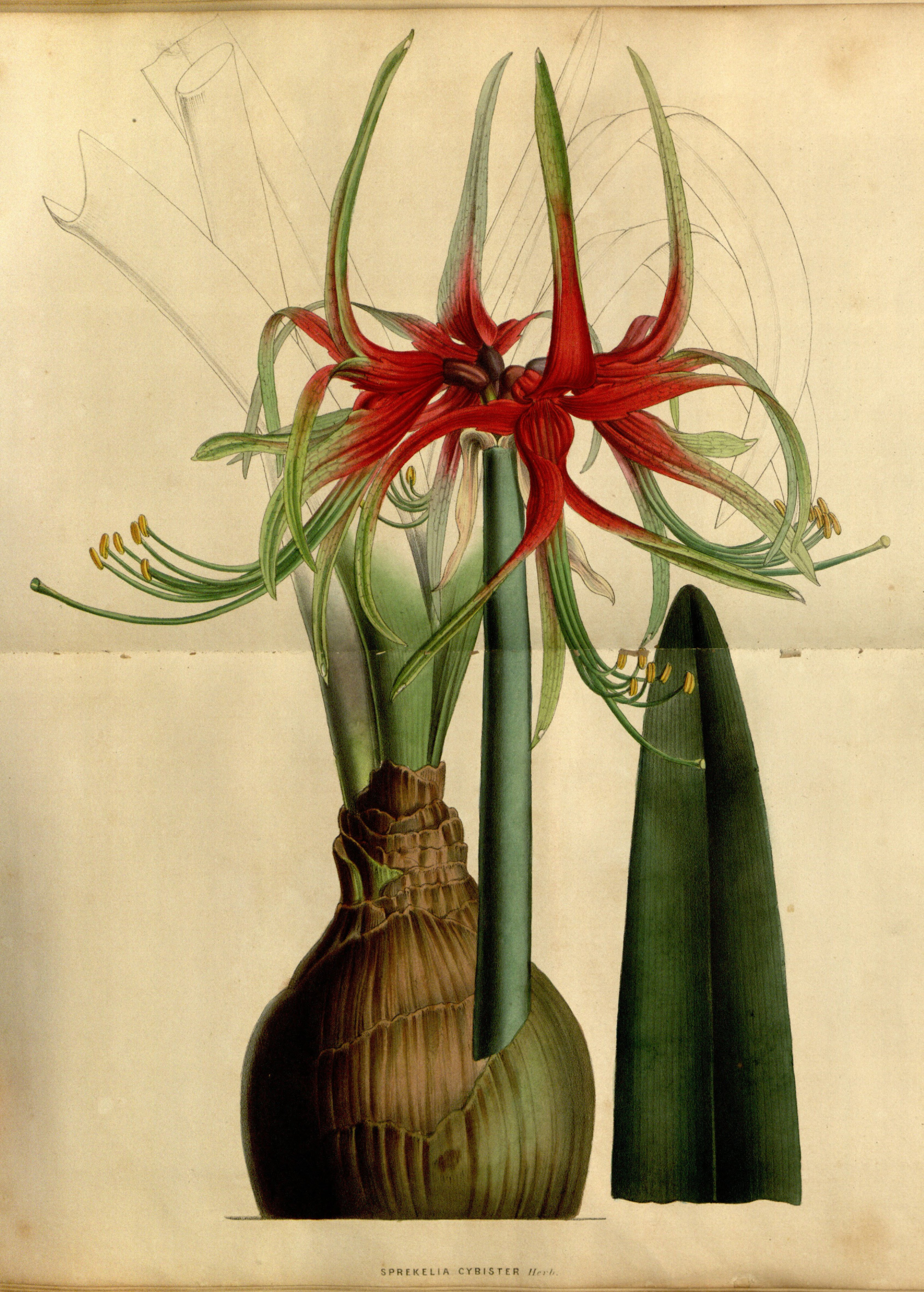

Scientific classification
- Kingdom: Plantae
- Clade: Tracheophytes
- Clade: Angiosperms
- Clade: Monocots
- Order: Asparagales
- Family: Amaryllidaceae
- Subfamily: Amaryllidoideae
- Genus: Hippeastrum
- Species: H. cybister

Binomial name
- Hippeastrum cybister (Herb.) Benth. ex Baker

Synonyms
- Amaryllis cybister (Herb.) Planch.

= Hippeastrum cybister =

Species of plant

Hippeastrum cybister is a flowering perennial herbaceous bulbous plant, in the family Amaryllidaceae, native from Bolivia to Argentina.

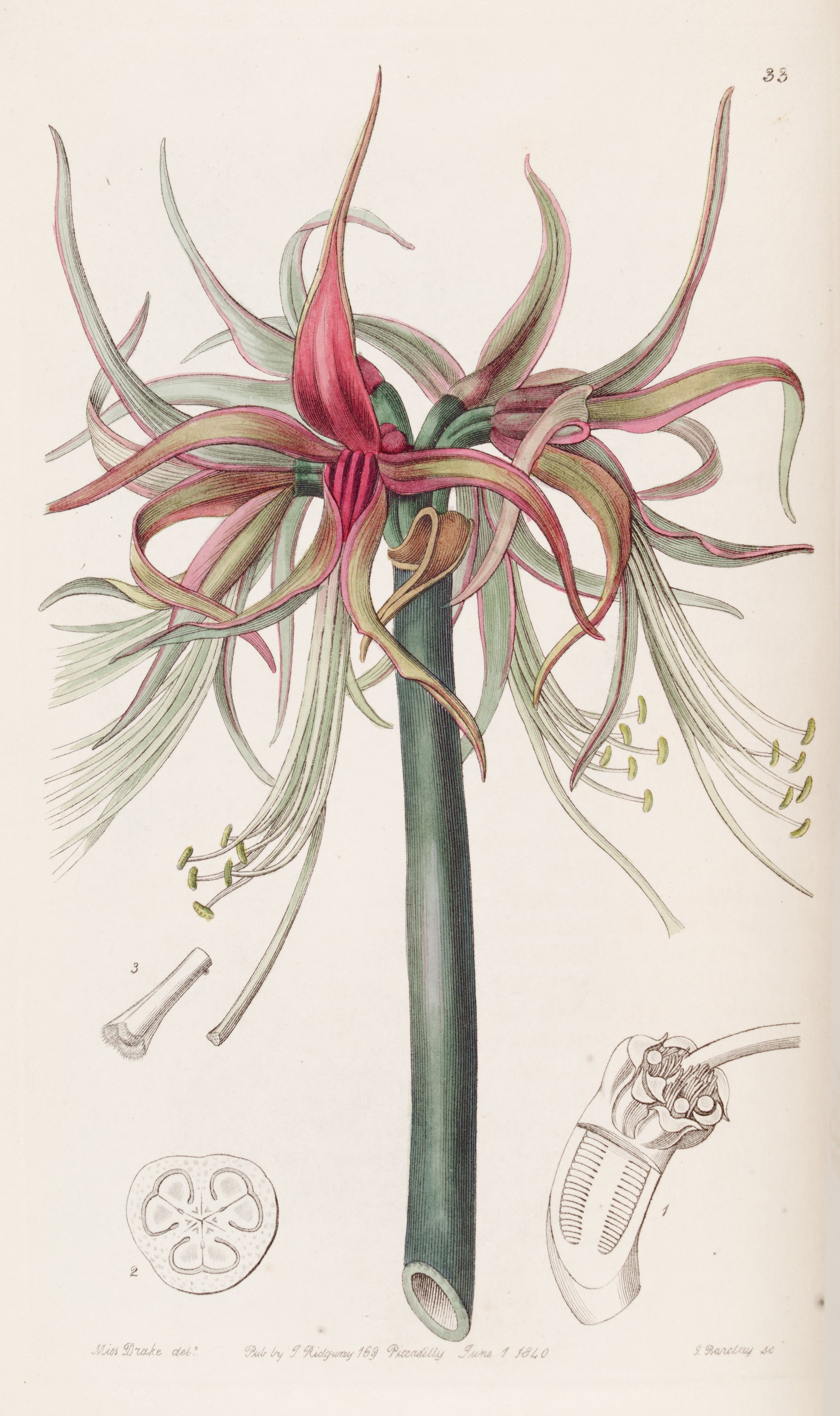
Edwards's Botanical Register 1840

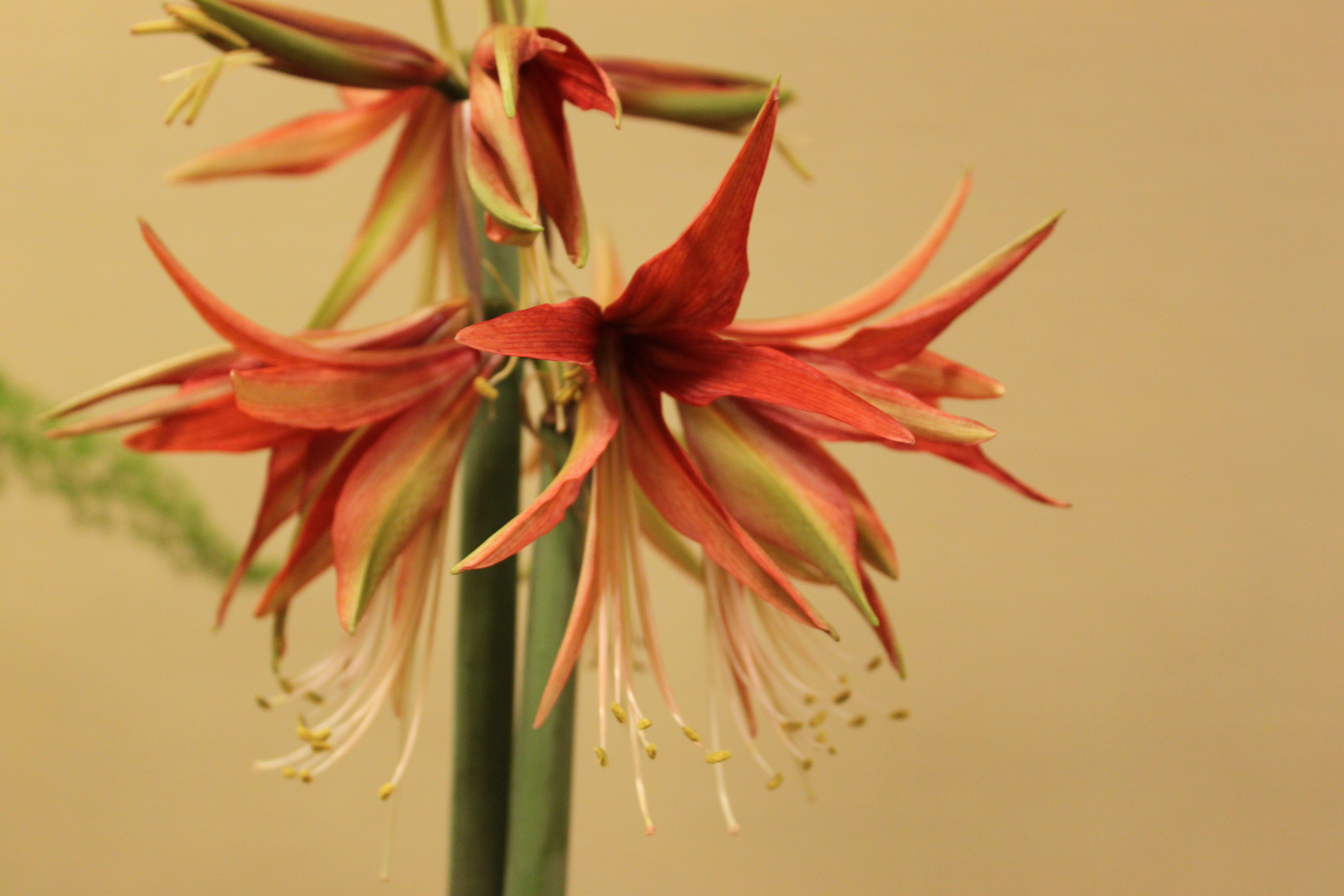

== Description ==
The stem is nineteen inches (48 cm) tall.

== Ecology ==
The flowering season for H. cybister is Spring to Summer, with dormancy during the Autumn, Winter, and part of the Spring.

== Taxonomy ==
Originally described by William Herbert, and formally named by John Gilbert Baker in 1888.

Synonyms:

- Sprekelia cybister Herb., Edwards's Bot. Reg. 26: t. 33. 1840. (Basionym)
- Amaryllis cybister (Herb.) Planch., Fl. Serres Jard. Eur. 5: t. 455. 1849.
- Hippeastrum anomalum Lindl. ex Planch., Fl. Serres Jard. Eur. 5: t. 455. 1849.
- Hippeastrum deflexum (Rusby) L.B.Sm., Contr. Gray Herb. 124: 6. 1939.
- Lepidopharynx deflexa Rusby, Mem. New York Bot. Gard. 7: 214. 1927.
- Sprekelia cybister var. brevis Herb., Edwards's Bot. Reg. 26: t. 33. 1840.
- Sprekelia cybister var. subsexuncialis Herb., Edwards's Bot. Reg. 26: t. 33. 1840.

== Sources ==
- The Plant List (2012). "Hippeastrum cybister".
- GBIF: Hippeastrum cybister
- Zuloaga, F. O., O. Morrone, M. J. Belgrano, C. Marticorena & E. Marchesi. (eds.) 2008. Catálogo de las Plantas Vasculares del Cono Sur (Argentina, Sur de Brasil, Chile, Paraguay y Uruguay). Monogr. Syst. Bot. Missouri Bot. Gard. 107(1): i–xcvi, 1–983; 107(2): i–xx, 985–2286; 107(3): i–xxi, 2287–3348.
