= Margaret Menzel =

American geneticist (1924–1987)

Margaret Young Menzel
- Born: Margaret Mary Young; June 21, 1924; Kerrville, Texas
- Died: May 30, 1987
- Education: University of Virginia
- Scientific career
- Workplaces: Florida State University
- Thesis: The cytotaxonomy and genetics of Physalis and related genera (1949)
- Doctoral advisor: Orland Emile White

Margaret Young Menzel was a geneticist known for her research on chromosomes and meiosis in a range of organisms including tomatoes, flowering plants, and worms. Menzel was also an advocate for equal opportunities for women and led a 1972 class action suit against Florida State University.

== Education and career ==
In 1944, Menzel graduated magna cum laude from Southwestern University in Texas where she majored in biology and English. Following this, she taught for a year at Lamar University before beginning her Ph.D. with Orland Emile White at the University of Virginia working on the genetics of Physalis, a type of flowering plant. Following her Ph.D. she held multiple positions including periods at the Texas Agricultural Experiment Station and the United States Department of Agriculture. She moved to Florida State University and was promoted to professor in 1968. She retired as professor emeritus.

Menzel was actively involved in the Association of Southeastern Biologists, including periods as vice president and editor of the ASB Bulletin from 1972 until 1977.

== Research ==
Menzel was known for her research on chromosomes, meiosis, and genetic relationships between organisms. She conducted this research on a broad array of species including plants such as Physalis and Hibiscus, the nematode Schistosoma, and agricultural crops such as tomatoes. Her work with Meta Brown on cotton plants centered on cotton cytogenetics and translocated chromosomes. Plants she collected during a 1960 sampling expedition to the Florida Panhandle remain in the herbarium at Florida State.

== Lawsuit against Florida State University ==
Menzel was an advocate for women's rights as she supported equal pay for women and was involved in the formation of the Florida chapter of the National Organization for Women.

In June 1972, a class action lawsuit (Margaret Menzel v. Florida State University et al. Docket No. TCA 1834) was filed in United States District Court, Northern District of Florida and Menzel's case is one of the cases cited as a key part of extending Title VII of the Civil Rights Act of 1964. Menzel's complaint centered on discrimination in pay and promotion; she was joined by nine other women working at Florida State University. At the time of the class action suit it was the first case where female professors used a court action to demand equal pay and status; one of the arguments was that sex discrimination began when men took over the administration of what had been Florida State College For Women when it admitted men and became Florida State University in 1947. A federal judge did not agree to back pay in 1973. In 1975, the case was settled with an agreement that Florida State would establish a task force to investigate bias against women at the university and to revise its anti-nepotism policy so as to not discriminate against the wives of university employees. Menzel later served as a witness for Laura Jepsen in her successful 1976 suit against Florida State University for gender discrimination.

== Selected publications ==
- Menzel, Margaret Young (1951). "The Cytotaxonomy and Genetics of Physalis". Proceedings of the American Philosophical Society. 95 (2): 132–183. ISSN 0003-049X. JSTOR 3143331.
- Short, Robert B.; Menzel, Margaret Y. (June 1960). "Chromosomes of Nine Species of Schistosomes". The Journal of Parasitology. 46 (3): 273–287. doi:10.2307/3275488. JSTOR 3275488. PMID 14446186.
- Wilson, F. D.; Menzel, M. Y. (1964). "Kenaf (Hibiscus cannabinus), roselle (Hibiscus sabdariffa)". Economic Botany. 18 (1): 80–91. doi:10.1007/BF02904005. ISSN 0013-0001. S2CID 186234283.
- Menzel, Margaret Y. (July 1962). "Pachytene Chromosomes of the Intergeneric Hybrid Lycopersicon Esculentum x Solanum lycopersicoides". American Journal of Botany. 49 (6): 605–615. doi:10.2307/2439718. JSTOR 2439718.
- Menzel, Margaret Y.; Price, J. M. (November 1966). "Fine Structure of Synapsed Chomosomes in F Lycopersicon esculentum- Solanum lycopersicoides and Its Parents". American Journal of Botany. 53 (10): 1079. doi:10.2307/2440688. JSTOR 2440688.

== Awards and honors ==
She received the Senior Research Award from the Association of Southeastern Biologists in 1950 and the Meritorious Teaching Award from the association in 1985. In 1988 the Department of Biological Sciences at Florida State University established the Margaret Y. Menzel Scholarship to recognize outstanding progress in graduate student research. Since 1989 the Botanical Society of America has awarded the Margaret Menzel Award each year for an outstanding paper presented at their annual meeting. In 2000, Florida State University began a program allowing faculty with named professorships to select the name used and in 2002, Walter R. Tschinkel opted to honor Menzel by becoming the "Margaret Menzel Professor of Biological Science".

== Personal life ==
Menzel met her husband, the malacologist R. Winston Menzel, while she was at the University of Virginia. They married in 1949. They had 3 children. They collaborated on one project on quahog clams which was published in 1965.
