= Fergus O'Rourke =

Irish entomologist

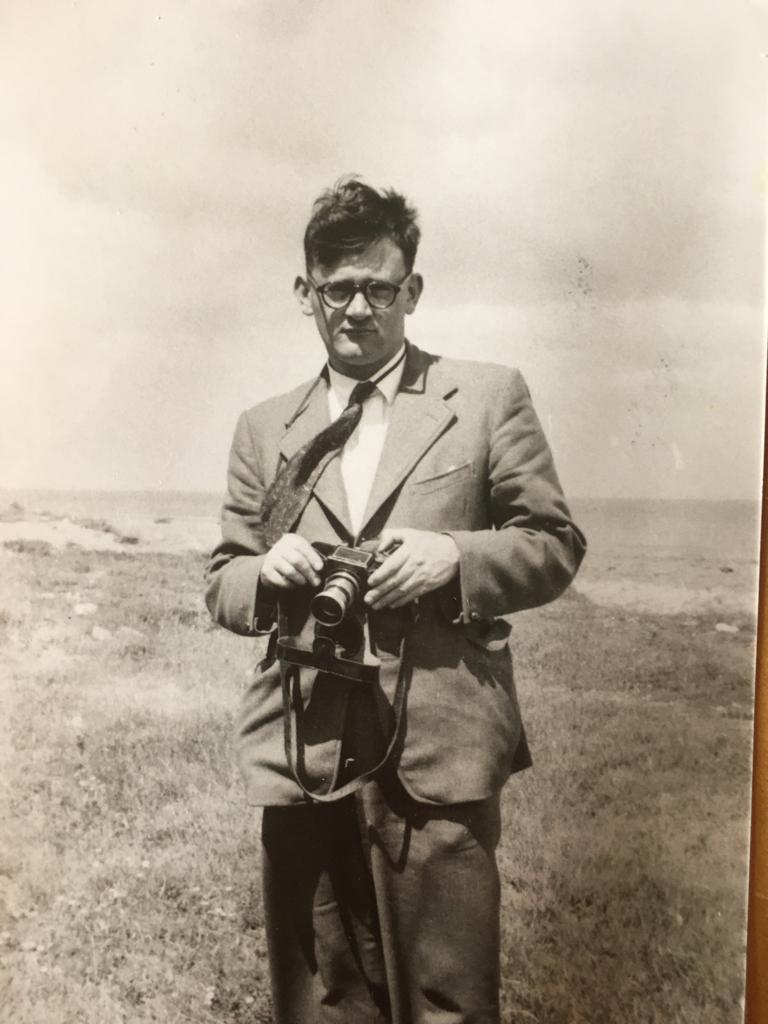

Dr Fergus J. O'Rourke, K.M., M.R.I.A. (1923–2010) was an Irish scientist whose publications included contributions to myrmecology and medical entomology. Educated at Belvedere College, and subsequently at University College Dublin, he graduated from University College Dublin both as a medical doctor and with a Masters in Science. He subsequently earned a PhD in Zoology. O'Rourke's 1948 survey of Irish ants was built on the earlier work of Stelfox and provided an authoritative description of Irish ants. O'Rourke (1956) provided an early consideration of the importance of ants as disease vectors. He was appointed Professor of Zoology at University College Cork and was elected a Member of the Royal Irish Academy and Fellow of the Royal Entomological Society of London.

He was a nephew of Horace Tennyson O'Rourke.

On 1 September 2023 Met Éireann, along with the national weather services of the UK (Met Office) and the Netherlands (KNMI), released the list of new storm names for the 2023/2024 storm season, which included eminent Irish/Northern-Irish scientists, to honour their important contributions to science and benefits for humankind. Fergus O'Rourke was included in this list for his work on providing an authoritative description of Irish ants and an early consideration of the importance of ants as disease vectors.

== Publications ==
- Corridan, J. P., F. J. O'Rourke and M. Verling (1969). 'Trichinella spiralis in the Red Fox (Vulpes vulpes) in Ireland', Nature, 222, p. 1191.
- Griffiths, R. B. and F. J. O'Rourke (1950). 'Observations on the Lesions Caused by Cnemidocoptes mutans and their Treatment, with Special Reference to the Use of 'Gammexane' ', Annals of Tropical Medicine and Parasitology, 44, pp. 93–100.
- Haen, P. J. and F. J. O'Rourke (1968). 'Proteins and Haemoglobins of Salmon-Trout Hybrids', Nature, 217, pp. 65–67.
- Keenan, E., E. MacWhite and F. J. O'Rourke (1944). 'An extended burial at Fassaroe, Co. Wicklow. ' Journal of the Royal Society of Antiquaries of Ireland, p. 146–54.
- O’Rourke, F.J. (1970a) The Fauna of Ireland. Cork: Mercier
- O'Rourke, F. J. (1970b). 'Rheotanytarsus Bause (Diptera: Chironomidae), A Genus Not Previously Recorded From Ireland, with Notes on the Question of the Species Occurring in Great Britain and Ireland', Entomologist's Gazette, 21, pp. 285–288.
- O'Rourke, F. J. (1968). 'A New Host for the Metacercaria of the Fluke Bucephalopsis Gracilescens (Rudolph)', Irish Naturalists' Journal, 16.
- O'Rourke, F. J. (1961). 'Presence of Blood Antigens in Fish Mucus and its Possible Parasitological Significance', Nature, 189, p. 943.
- O'Rourke, F. J. (1960a). 'Zoonoses: The Diseases of Animals Transmissible to Man', Irish Journal of Medical Science, pp. 443–452.
- O'Rourke, F. J. (1960b). 'The Future of Insect Control: Biological or Chemical', The Journal of the Institute of Chemistry of Ireland, 5, pp. 28–41.
- O'Rourke, F. J. (1956). 'The medical and veterinary importance of the formicidae', Insectes Sociaux, 3, pp. 107–118.
- O'Rourke, F. J. (1952). 'A preliminary ecological classification of ant communities in Ireland', Entomologist's Gazette, 3, pp. 69–72.
- O'Rourke, F. J. (1955). 'Arthropods and human health ', Irish Journal of Medical Science, 30, pp. 78–82.
- O'Rourke, F. J. (1950). 'Myrmecological notes from Narvik, northern Norway', Norsk Entomologisk Tidsskrift, 8, pp. 47–50.
- O'Rourke, F. J. (1948). 'The Distribution and General Ecology of the Irish Formicidae', Proceedings of the Royal Irish Academy. Section B: Biological, Geological, and Chemical Science, 52, pp. 383–410.
- O'Rourke, F. J. (1945a). 'A Further Extension of the Range of Myrmica Schenki, Emery', Entomologist's Record, VII, pp. 85–86.
- O'Rourke, F. J. (1945b). 'A kitchen-midden at Dog's Bay, Roundstone, Co. Galway (note)', Journal of the Royal Society of Antiquaries of Ireland, 75, p. 115–8
