= Henry Honywood Dombrain =

- Born: 1818; London
- Died: 1905 (aged 86–87)
- Scientific career
- Fields: Botany, mycology
- Author abbrev. (botany): Dombrain

Henry Honywood Dombrain (1818–1905) was a British botanist, mycologist and cleric who specialised in the study of ornamental flowering plants.

== Publications ==
- 1873. The gladiolus: its history, cultivation, and exhibition, (ed.) L. Reeve & Co, 56 pp. (Reissued 2009, Cornell University Library)
- 1908. Roses for amateurs;: A practical guide to the selection and cultivation of the best roses for exhibition or garden decoration, (ed.) Gill; 3rd ed., 116 pp. (Reissued Kessinger Publishing 2009. ISBN 1-104-46028-9)
