= Walter R. Tschinkel =

American entomologist

- Born: 15 September 1940
- Education: Wesleyan University
- Occupations: Entomologist; university teacher; biologist
- Awards: Fellow of the American Association for the Advancement of Science (2020); NSF Graduate Research Fellowship Program
- Scientific career
- Fields: Entomology, myrmecology, Ant
- Workplaces: Florida State University (1970–)

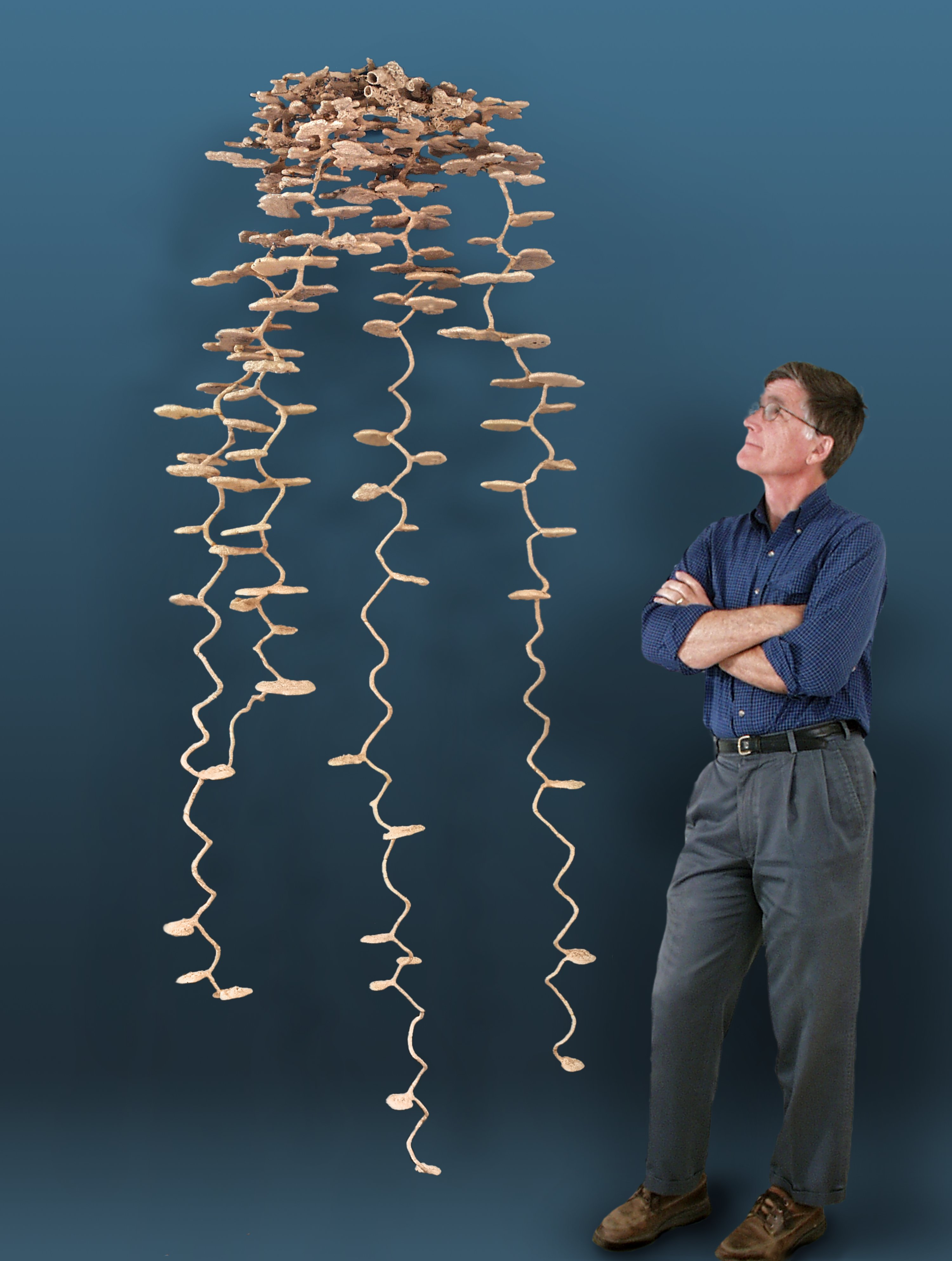

Walter R. Tschinkel (born 1940) is an American myrmecologist, entomologist and Distinguished Research Professor of Biological Science and R.O. Lawton Distinguished Professor emeritus at Florida State University, and Fellow of the American Association for the Advancement of Science (AAAS). He is the author of the Pulitzer Prize nominated book The Fire Ants (Harvard University/Belknap Press 2006), the book Ant Architecture: The Wonder, Beauty, and Science of Underground Nests (Princeton University Press 2021), and more than 150 original research papers on the natural history, ecology, nest architecture and organization of ant societies; chemical communication in beetles; and the mysterious fairy circles of the Namib desert. His casts of ant nests and botanical drawings appear in numerous museums of art and natural history, from Hong Kong to Paris.

== Biography ==
Walter Reinhart Tschinkel was born on September 15, 1940, in what is now the Czech Republic. He is the son of Dr. Johann G. Tschinkel and Lotte G. Tschinkel and brother to Henry and Helga Tschinkel. His family emigrated to the United States in 1946, where his father worked in rocket development for the U.S. Army at Fort Bliss, Texas, and later for the Space Flight Center in Huntsville, Alabama. In 1962, Walter received a B.A. in biology from Wesleyan University in Middletown, Connecticut. He went on to the University of California, Berkeley, where he completed a Masters (1965) and PhD (1968) with Howard Bern and Clyde Willson, in Comparative Biochemistry, for work on the chemical communication and chemical defenses of tenebrionid beetles. Following graduation, he conducted postdoctoral research with Tom Eisner at Cornell University in Ithaca, New York, and later served as a lecturer at the Rhodes University in Grahamstown, South Africa. He accepted a position in the Department of Biological Science at Florida State University in Tallahassee, Florida, in 1970, attaining the status of full professor in 1980.

In 2000, Florida State University began a program allowing faculty with named professorships to select the name used and in 2002, Tschinkel opted to honor Margaret Menzel by opting for the "Margaret Menzel Professor of Biological Science". In 2007, he was awarded the R.O. Lawton Distinguished Professorship, the highest academic honor bestowed by Florida State University. In 2011, the ant nest ichnofossil, Daimoniobarax tschinkeli, was named in Tschinkel's honor. In 2012 he was inducted as a fellow of the Entomological Society of America. In 2020, he was named Fellow of the American Association for the Advancement of Science (AAAS) "For distinguished contributions to the field of experimental behavioral ecology and sociobiology, particularly chemical ecology, sociometry, sociogenesis and unraveling the complex nest architecture in ants." Tschinkel is co-founder of the environmental advocacy group, Friends of The Apalachicola National Forest, and a committee member for The Nierenberg Prize for Science in the Public Interest. Retired since 2013, Tschinkel lives in Tallahassee Florida with his wife Victoria Tschinkel (m. 1968). They have one daughter, Erika Tschinkel.

== Experimentalism ==
Tschinkel is known for his thorough and inventive experimental design, often involving the construction of special contraptions (stimulatorium, trash can kiln, ice nests) and re-purposing methods from other fields of inquiry. In 1991, he coined the term "insect sociometry" to describe an under-emphasized method, involving the detailed physical and numerical description of social insect colonies; which he views as superorganisms. He is an advocate of scientific natural history and the "bottom-up" approach to biological research, noting that, "...empirical evidence is the horse that pulls the cart of theory through testing, and the three move along the road to understanding." He suggests that novel and meaningful research questions are best derived from extensive observation, familiarity and careful experimentation.

Tschinkel has written extensively on education. He also served as a major professor and mentor to 22 Masters and PhD students, and more than 71 undergraduate researchers. In 2013, Tschinkel retired from teaching but remains active in research, with field sites in Florida's Apalachicola National Forest and Namibia.

=== Foci ===
- Chemical defenses of tenebrionid beetles: chemistry, behavior, morphology
- Comparative internal morphology and systematics of tenebrionid beetles
- Inhibition of metamorphosis by crowding in the tenebrionid beetle Zophobas rugipes (endocrinology, behavior, life history and population dynamics).
- Architecture of subterranean ant nests (numerous species)
- Social biology of the fire ant, Solenopsis invicta
- Natural history of numerous ant species

== Bibliography ==
- Walter R. Tschinkel (2006). The Fire Ants. Cambridge: Belknap Press of Harvard University Press. ISBN 0-674-02207-6.
- Walter R. Tschinkel (2021). Ant Architecture: The Wonder, Beauty, and Science of Underground Nests. Princeton University Press. ISBN 978-0-691-17931-5.
- Full publication list
