= Laura Jepsen =

American academic (1907–1995)

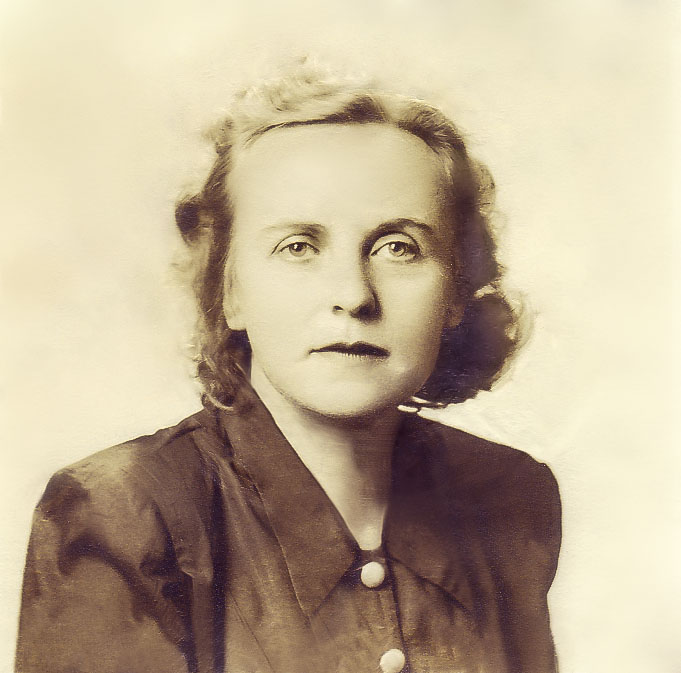
Laura Jepsen, passport photo, 1948

Laura Jepsen (October 30, 1907 – December 24, 1995) was a professor of comparative literature at Florida State University.

== Biography ==
Jepsen was born on October 30, 1907, in O'Brien County, Iowa. Her parents were John Jepsen and Marguerite Unangst Jepsen. She wrote her doctoral thesis, Ethos in Classical and Shakespearean Tragedy in 1946.

In 1972, having worked at the university since 1946, Jepsen successfully filed suit against her employers for gender discrimination. Margaret Menzel, a professor who led a class action suit against Florida State University in 1972, supported Jepsen's case against the university. The settlement from this suit allowed her to set up Tallahassee Museum of History and Natural Science and the Leon County Humane Society.

Jepsen died from cancer on December 24, 1995.

== Lichgate on High Road ==
She is noted for her house at Lichgate on High Road, which she built in the style of an English Tudor cottage. This cottage was inspired by the Earl Gresh Wood Parade tourist attraction located in St. Petersburg, FL. In Laura's last book, written in 1982 entitled, Lichgate on High Road, Laura wrote the following, "It occurred to me that it might not be impossible to move a small house from St. Petersburg, Florida, to a site in Tallahassee. There was, of course, a considerable difference between ten and two-hundred-fifty miles, and also between moving a load of logs and a structure with four walls. Consulting a mover, I was told the roof would have to be removed and during the process the cornices might be destroyed. The little house, constructed by the builders of a museum to display woods of various trees in the world, was, like its neighbor, a model of Tudor architecture, with the steep roof cut away over doors and windows to represent the rood of a thatched cottage and with the tall chimney surmounted by a chimney pot."
