= Henry Hurd Rusby =

American botanist, pharmacist and explorer

Henry Hurd Rusby (1855–1940) was an American botanist, pharmacist and explorer. He discovered several new species of plants and played a significant role in founding the New York Botanical Garden and developing research and exploration programs at the institution. He helped to establish the field of economic botany, and left a collection of research and published works in botany and pharmacology.

He joined a series of expeditions from 1880 and 1921 and in 1921, he led the Mulford Expedition to the Amazon.

== Biography ==
Henry H. Rusby grew up in Franklin (today Nutley) New Jersey. He showed a passionate interest in plants. At 21, his herbarium won first prize at the Philadelphia Centennial Exposition in 1876. He came to meet Dr. George Thurber who was President of the Torrey Botanical Club. Rusby joined the club in 1879, and by then studied medicine at the School of Medicine of New York University.

In 1880, still a medical student, he spent 18 months collecting plants in Texas and New Mexico for the Smithsonian Institution. In 1883 he returned to the Southwest to study and collect medicinal flora of Arizona, for Parke-Davis & Co.

In 1884, he graduated with his degree in medicine, and in the following year he embarked on a two-year expedition for Parke, Davis & Co., crossing South America and exploring remote regions of Colombia, Ecuador, Peru, Chile, Bolivia and Brazil.

In 1887, he married Margaretta Saunier Hanna.

Although trained as a physician, Rusby chose to leave medicine for his interest in plants.

In 1889, he became Professor of Botany and Materia Medica at the School of Pharmacy at Columbia University. He was Dean of the Faculty for 26 years until his retirement in 1930, and Dean Emeritus until his death in 1940.

His association with New York Botanical Garden began even before the garden was formally created. As a member of Torrey Botanical Club, he encountered the celebrated botanist and taxonomist Nathaniel Lord Britton. Establishing a botanical garden was a goal for the Torrey Botanical Club. In 1888 a pro-Garden committee of Botany, with eight distinguished members of the club, including Britton and Rusby was formed. Rusby was instrumental in collaboration between the Herbarium School of Columbia, and the botanical Library at the New York Botanical Garden.

In 1893, Nathaniel Lord Britton published Rusbya, a monotypic genus of flowering plants from Bolivia, belonging to the family Ericaceae and its name is in honour of Henry Hurd Rusby.

On January 26, 1898, Rusby was designated the "Honorary Curator of the Museum of Economic Botany.

His tropical explorations, particularly in the Amazon, provided materials for taxonomic studies and economic botany by the New York Botanical Garden. Productivity in these explorations was due to his strength and exploration skills.

In 1921, at age 65, he made his last trip to South America as Director of the "Mulford Biological Exploration of the Amazon Basin".

Rusby died on November 18, 1940, aged 85.

== Selected works ==
- with Smith Ely Jelliffe: Essentials of Vegetable Pharmacognosy, 1895.
- "Report of Work on the Mulford Biological Exploration of 1921–22". Journal of the New York Botanical Garden 23(272): 101–111, August 1922.
- "New Species of Trees of Medicinal Interest from Bolivia". Bulletin of the Torrey Botanical Club 49: 259–264, September 1922; & Journal of the American Pharmaceutical Association, October 1922.
- "Descriptions of New Genera and Species of Plants Collected on the Mulford Biological Exploration of the Amazon Valley, 1921–1922,". Memoirs of the New York Botanical Garden 7: 205–387, March 1927.
- Autobiography, Jungle Memories. 1933.
- Rusby edited several exsiccatae, among others the series Plantae Bolivianae a Miguel Bang lectae together with Nathaniel Lord Britton.

== See also ==
- http://sciweb.nybg.org/science2/libr/finding_guide/rusbyw.asp.html biography
- obituary
- Bunchosia armeniaca
- Lophopappus
- Stenomeria
- Elizabeth Gertrude Britton
