= Dunn =

Dunn may refer to:

== Places in the United States ==
- Dunn, Indiana, a ghost town
- Dunn, Missouri, an unincorporated community
- Dunn, North Carolina, a city
- Dunn County, North Dakota, county
- Dunn, Texas, an unincorporated community
- Dunn County, Wisconsin, county
- Dunn, Dane County, Wisconsin, town
- Dunn, Dunn County, Wisconsin, town

== People ==
- Dunn baronets, three baronetcies in the Baronetage of the United Kingdom
- Dunn (bishop), an 8th-century English bishop
- Dunn (surname), a surname
- DUNN, an alias of Fritz Duquesne during World War II

== Taxonomy ==
There are 2 different instances where the last name Dunn is used to give the authority behind names of species:

- Emmett Reid Dunn (1894–1956), U. S. zoologist, mostly in the names of snakes, frogs etc. in the Americas
- Stephen Troyte Dunn (1868–1938), British botanist, mostly in the names of plants in China

== Other ==
- Dunn Engineering, racecar makers
- J. E. Dunn Construction Group, a construction company
- Dunn Memorial Bridge in Albany, New York
- Dunn's, a Canadian restaurant chain
- Dunns Bakery, a bakery in North London, UK
- Dunns, a clothing retailer, subsidiary of Pepkor

== See also ==
- Dun (disambiguation)
- Dunn Brothers (disambiguation)
- Dunne, Irish surname
- Dunnes, Irish retail chain
- Justice Dunn (disambiguation)
