= Dun =

Dun most commonly refers to:

- Dun gene, which produces a brownish-gray color (dun) in horses and other Equidae
- Dun (fortification), an ancient or medieval fort

Dun or DUN may also refer to:

== Places ==
=== Scotland ===
- Dun, Angus, a civil parish in Scotland
- Dun Bhruichlinn, an Iron Age fort south of Esknish, Islay, Scotland
- Dun Borrafiach, an Iron Age broch on the island of Skye, Scotland
- Dun Guaidhre, an Iron Age fort southwest of Kilmeny, Islay, Scotland
- Dun Nosebridge, an Iron Age fort southeast of Bridgend, Islay, Scotland
- Dun Ringill, an Iron Age hill fort on the Strathaird peninsula on the island of Skye, Scotland
- Dùn, an island of St Kilda, Scotland
- House of Dun, a Scottish estate

=== Iran ===
- Dun, Iran, a village in Hormozgan Province, Iran
- Dun Sar, a village in Gatab-e Shomali Rural District, Gatab District, Babol County, Mazandaran Province, Iran

=== France ===
- Dun, Ariège, a commune in southern France
- Dun-le-Poëlier, a commune in central France
- Dun-sur-Meuse, a commune in northern France

=== Other countries ===
- Dun, Norway, a village in Trøndelag, Norway
- Dün, a range of hills in Thuringia, Germany
- Dun or Doon Valley (Hindi: दून) in the Sivalik hills of northern India
- Dun Glacier, in Antarctica

== People with the name or title ==
=== Given name or title ===
- Consort Dun (1746–1806), Chinese imperial consort
- Dun Deal (born 1986), American record producer and rapper
- Dun Mihaka
- Dun Karm Psaila (1871–1961), Maltese writer and poet
- Dun Mikiel Xerri (1737–1799), Maltese patriot
- Mao Dun (1896-1981), Chinese writer
- Tan Dun (born 1957), Chinese composer
- Xiahou Dun (d. 220), Chinese general and politician

=== Surname ===
- Angus Dun (1892–1971), American clergyman and author
- Dennis Dun (born 1952), Chinese–American actor
- Edwin Dun (1848–1931), American agriculturalist
- Jean Dun (died 1735), French opera singer
- Josh Dun (born 1988), American musician and drummer of Twenty One Pilots
- Smith Dun (1906-1979), Burmese Army commander-in-chief
- William Sutherland Dun (1868–1934), Australian palaeontologist and geologist

== Biology ==
- Subimago, or dun, a stage in the life cycle of mayflies, especially an artificial fishing fly tied to imitate one

== Computing and technology ==
- Dial-up networking (DUN) a dialed connection to the Internet via public telephone lines
  - Dial-up Networking Profile, a Bluetooth computer communications profile

== Other uses ==
- Data Universal Numbering System (DUNS), a unique numeric identifier for businesses
- Dewan Undangan Negeri (DUN), the legislatures of Malaysian states
- Dün (band), a French progressive rock band active 1978-1981
- Dun & Bradstreet, an American credit reporting agency
- Dun comma or enumeration comma, a Chinese punctuation mark
- Dun Cow, a brown bovine; a common motif in English folklore
- Prince Dun, a peerage in Manchu China

== See also ==
- Dunn (disambiguation)
- River Dun (disambiguation)
- Duns (disambiguation)
- Dunning (disambiguation)
- Doon (disambiguation)
