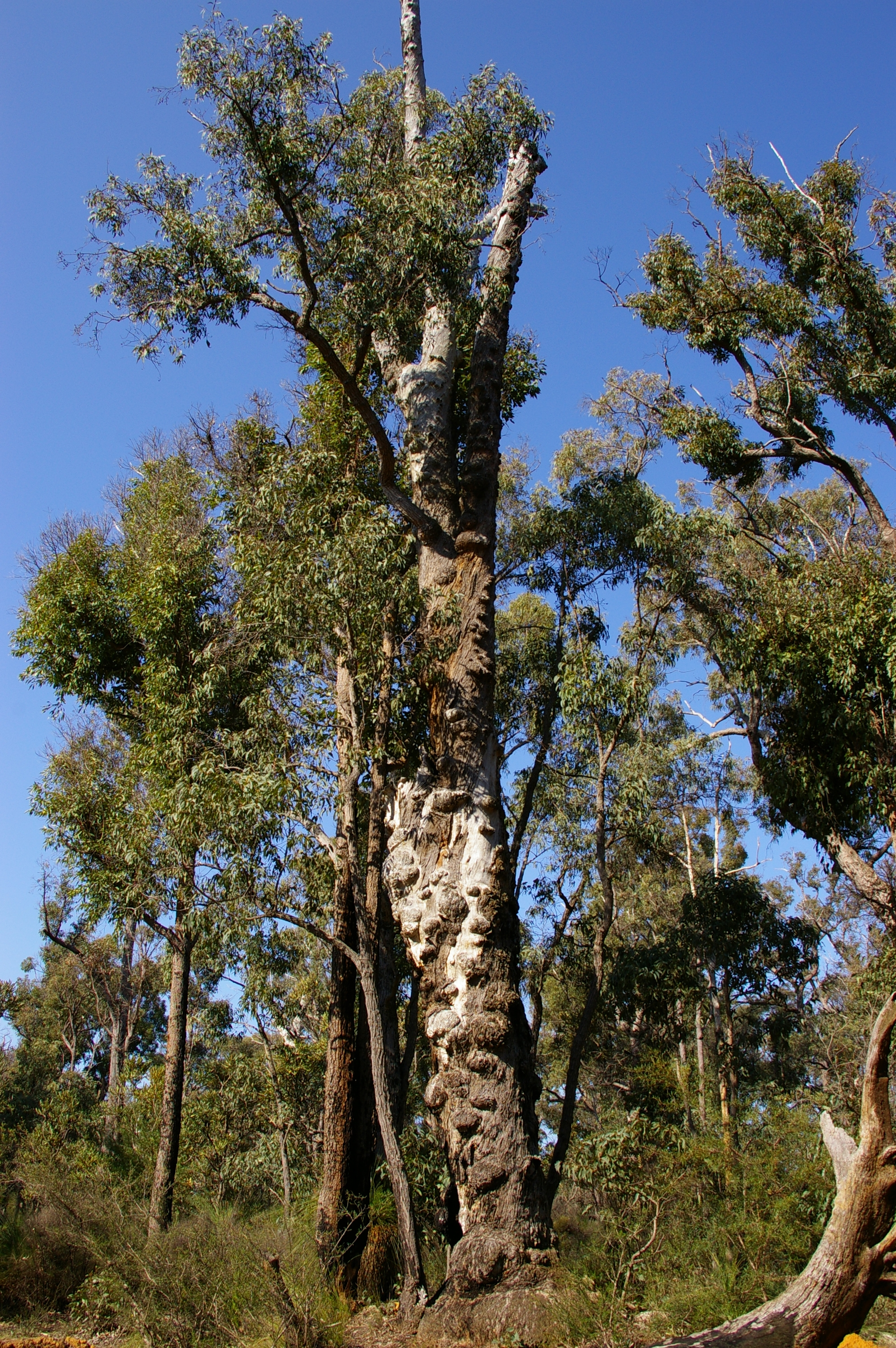

Conservation status
- Near Threatened (IUCN 3.1)

Scientific classification
- Kingdom: Plantae
- Clade: Tracheophytes
- Clade: Angiosperms
- Clade: Eudicots
- Clade: Rosids
- Order: Myrtales
- Family: Myrtaceae
- Genus: Eucalyptus
- Species: E. marginata

Binomial name
- Eucalyptus marginata Donn ex Sm.

Subspecies
- E. marginata subsp. marginata; E. marginata subsp. thalassica; E. marginata subsp. spurgeana

Synonyms
- Eucalyptus floribunda Hügel ex Endl.; Eucalyptus hypoleuca Schauer; Eucalyptus mahagoni F.Muell. orth.var.; Eucalyptus mahoganii F.Muell.; Eucalyptus marginata Donn nom. inval., nom. nud.; Eucalyptus pedicellata Maiden nom. inval., pro syn.; Eucalyptus pedicellata Grimwade nom. inval., pro syn.

= Eucalyptus marginata =

Jarrah

Species of plant endemic to Western Australia

Eucalyptus marginata, commonly known as jarrah, is a plant in the myrtle family, Myrtaceae and is endemic to the south-west of Western Australia. It is a tree with rough, fibrous bark, leaves with a distinct midvein, white flowers and relatively large, more or less spherical fruit. Its hard, dense timber is insect resistant although the tree is susceptible to dieback. The timber has been utilised for cabinet-making, flooring and railway sleepers. It is known as djarraly in Noongar language and historically as Swan River mahogany.

== Description ==
Jarrah is a tree which sometimes grows to a height of up to 50 m (160 ft) with a diameter at breast height (DBH) of 3.5 m (11 ft), but is more often 40 m (130 ft) tall with a DBH of up to 2 m (6 ft 7 in). Less commonly it can be a small mallee to 3 m (9.8 ft) high. Older specimens have a lignotuber and roots that extend down as far as 40 m (100 ft).

It is a stringybark with rough, greyish-brown, vertically grooved, fibrous bark which sheds in long flat strips. The leaves are arranged alternately along the branches, narrow lance-shaped, often curved, 8–13 cm (3–5 in) long and 1.5–3 cm (0.6–1 in) broad, shiny dark green above and paler below. There is a distinct midvein, spreading lateral veins and a marginal vein separated from the margin. The stalked flower buds are arranged in umbels of between 4 and 8, each bud with a narrow, conical cap 5–9 mm (0.2–0.4 in) long. The flowers 1–2 cm (0.4–0.8 in) in diameter, with many white stamens and bloom in spring and early summer. The fruit are spherical to barrel-shaped, and 9–20 mm (0.4–0.8 in) long and broad.

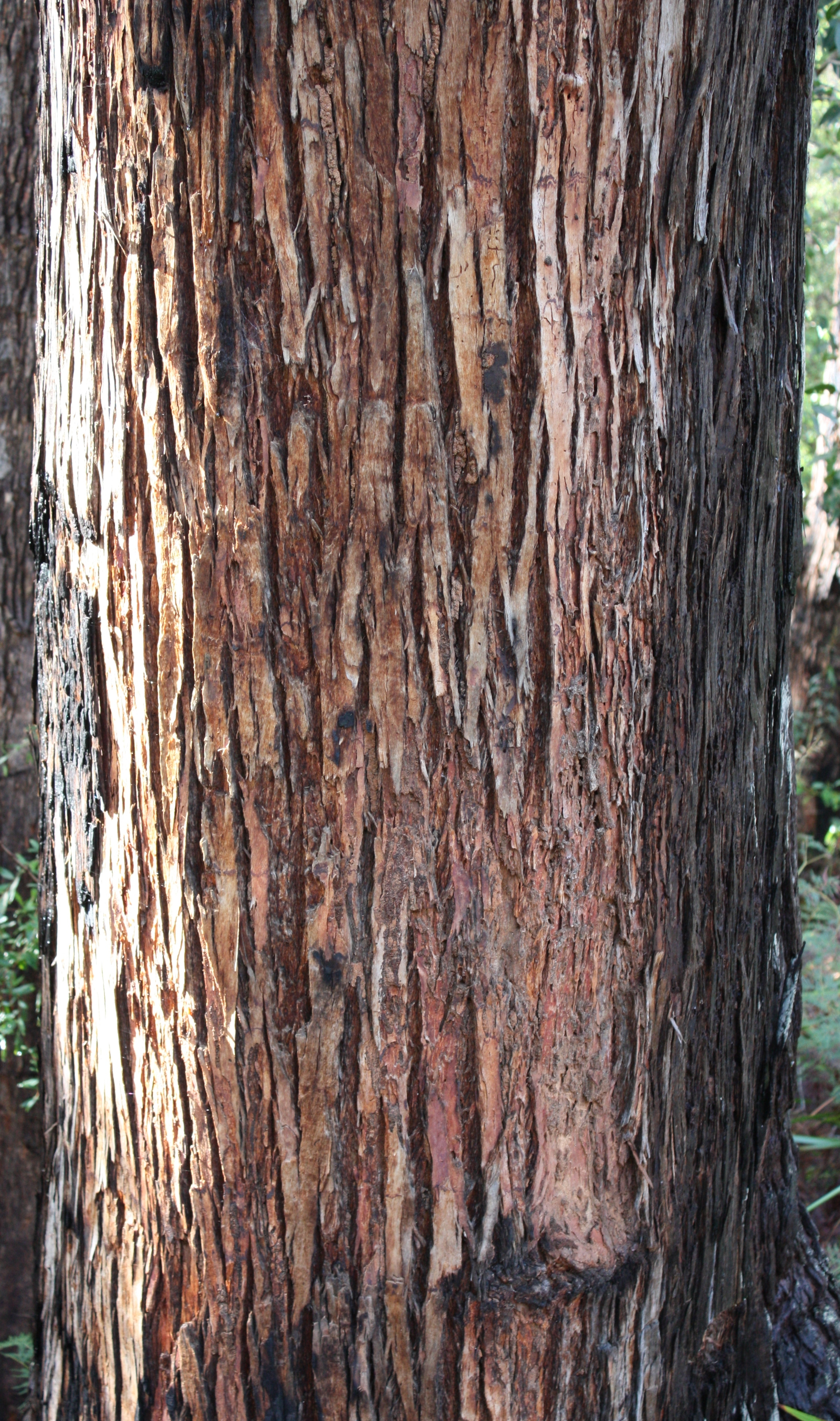
Bark

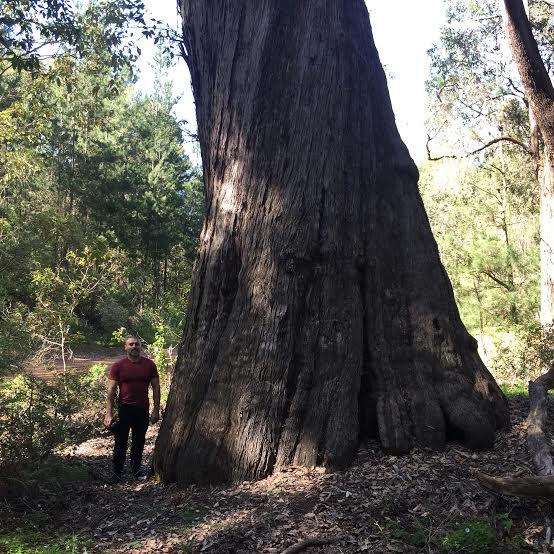
The Looming Relic, the largest jarrah

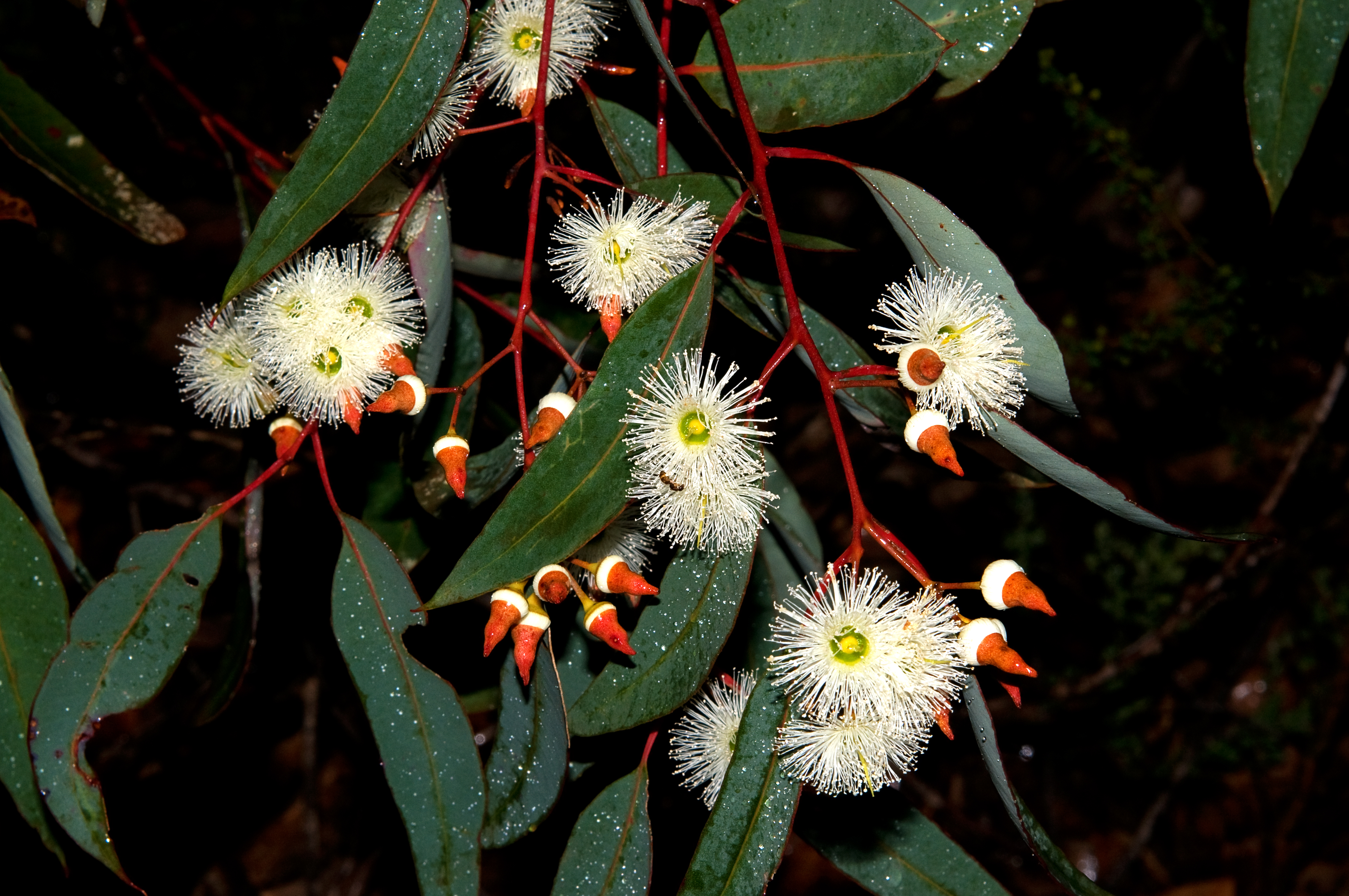
Blossom

== Taxonomy and naming ==
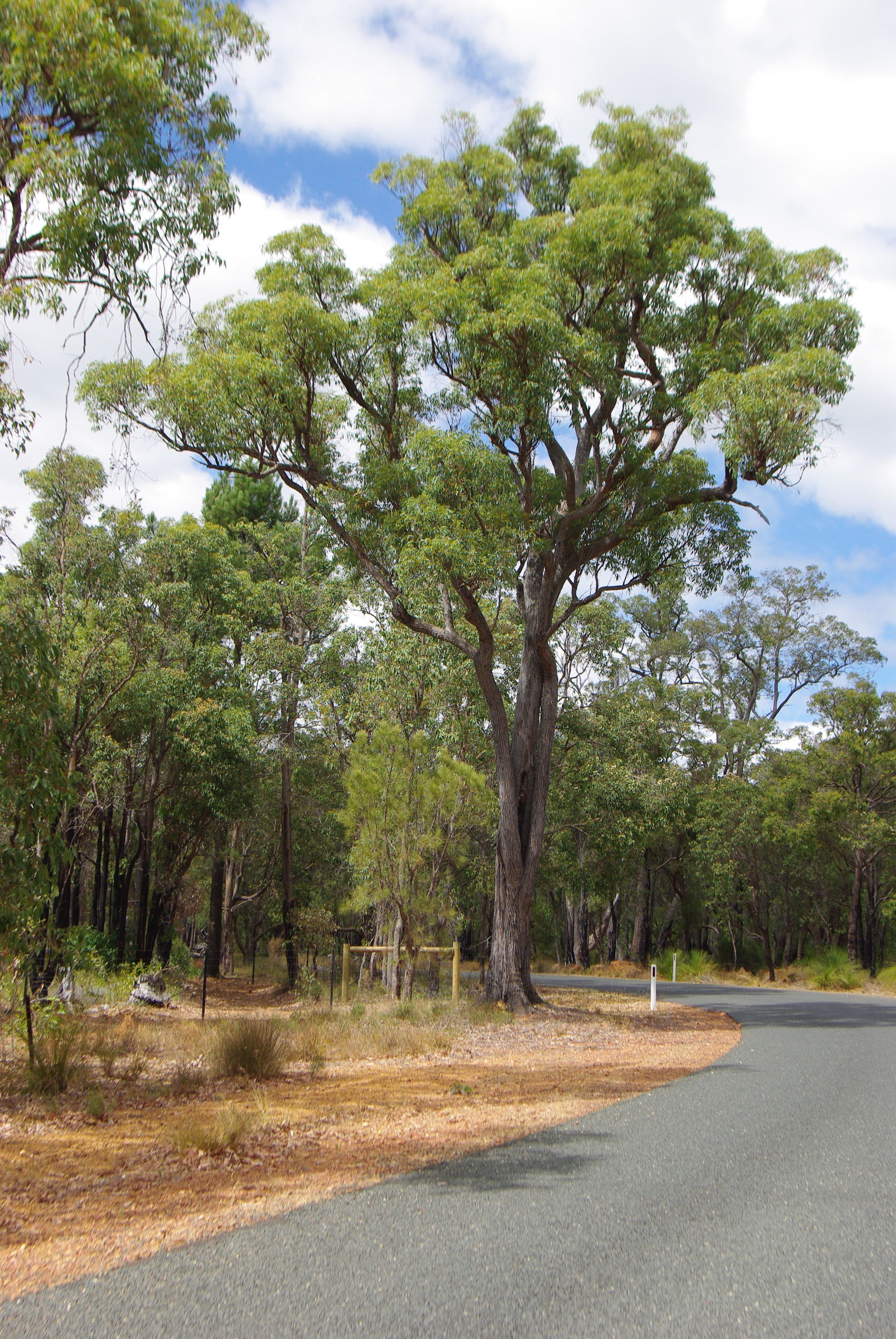
Roadside jarrah tree in Darling Range

The name Eucalyptus marginata was first used in 1796 by James Donn in the second edition of his Hortus Cantabrigiensis, but his name was a nomen nudum because Dunn did not include a description of the species. The first formal description of the species was by James Edward Smith in Transactions of the Linnean Society of London in 1802. Smith noted that his specimens had grown from seeds brought from Port Jackson and noted a resemblance to both Eucalyptus robusta and E. pilularis. The specific epithet (marginata) is a Latin word meaning "furnished with a border". Smith did not provide an etymology for the epithet but did note that, compared to E. robusta "the margin [of the leaves] is more thickened".

== Distribution and habitat ==
Eucalyptus marginata occurs in the south-west corner of Western Australia, generally where the rainfall isohyet exceeds 600 mm (20 in). It is found inland as far as Mooliabeenee, Clackline and Narrogin and in the south as far east as the Stirling Range. Its northern limit is Mount Peron near Jurien Bay but there are also outliers at Kulin and Tutanning in the Pingelly Shire. The plant often takes the form of a mallee in places like Mount Lesueur and in the Stirling Range but it is usually a tree and in southern forests sometimes reaches a height of 40 metres (130 ft). It typically grows in soils derived from ironstone and is generally found within its range, wherever ironstone is present.

The jarrah forest occurs in either intimate mixtures or as a mosaic of different forest types with marri (Corymbia calophylla), wandoo (E. wandoo), powderbark wandoo (E. accedens), blackbutt (E. patens), karri (E. diversicolor) and yellow tingle (E. guilfoylei).

The area of jarrah forest at the time of European settlement is estimated to have been 2.8 million hectares, although the species occurred over an area double that size. Sixty five per cent of the original forest area remains, with approximately 1.6 million hectares on public land. The forests are located within the south-west botanical province of Western Australia which is recognised as one of the world's 25 global biodiversity hotspots, with approximately 7,400 species of vascular plants, half of which are endemic. It is home to 245 vertebrate species, comprising 29 mammal, 150 bird, 44 reptile, 11 amphibian and 11 fish.

== Ecology ==
Jarrah dieback is a disease caused by Phytophthora cinnamomi but affects many other plants species as well as Eucalyptus marginata. More reliable indicators of site infestation are Banksia grandis and understorey species such as Xanthorrhoea preissii and X. gracilis. The sites where E. marginata is most at risk are those where the soil profile does not allow trees to develop an extensive deep, vertical root system, so that summer survival is much more dependent on internally stored water.

Jarrah is regarded as one of the six forest giants found in Western Australia; the other trees include; Eucalyptus gomphocephala (tuart), Eucalyptus diversicolor (karri), Eucalyptus jacksonii (red tingle), Corymbia calophylla (marri) and Eucalyptus patens (yarri).

Jarrah has shown considerable adaptation to different ecologic zones – as in the Swan Coastal Plain and further north, and also to a different habitat of the lateritic Darling Scarp.

The jarrah tree produces an abundance of creamy white flowers during its blooming season which typically occurs between September and January. The jarrah is capable of flowering each year, but full the floral cycle takes three years to complete. Significant flowering events occur on a four to six year cycle, with most trees within any region flowering at the same time.

== Conservation status ==
Eucalyptus marginata was added to the IUCN Red List as a "near threatened" species in 2019.

== Uses ==
Jarrah timber is mainly used for cabinet making and furniture, although in the past it was used in general construction, railway sleepers and piles. In the 19th century, famous roads in other countries were paved with jarrah blocks covered with asphalt.

Jarrah wood was critical to charcoal making and charcoal iron smelting operations at Wundowie from 1948 to 1981.

The local poet Dryblower Murphy wrote a poem, "Comeanavajarrah" that was published in The Sunday Times of May 1904, about the potential to extract alcohol from jarrah timber.

After native logging became banned in Western Australia in 2024, jarrah has become more rare, only able to be obtained as recycled timber from sources such as demolished houses and railway sleepers.

Eucalyptus marginata have been used for traditional purposes as well. Some parts of the jarrah tree were used as a remedy for some illnesses and diseases. Fever, colds, headaches, skin diseases and snakes bites were traditionally cured through the use of jarrah leaves and bark.

Jarrah honey is a monofloral honey produced by bees that forage on the nectar of the jarrah tree. Like other honeys, it anti-bacterial and anti-oxidant qualities. Average production of jarrah honey is only 100 tonnes per annum but the yield is significantly impacted by the environment (fire, rainfall, soil moisture and temperatures). For example a peak yield of 400 tonnes was recorded in the 2011–12 season, while the harvest was only 50 tonnes in the 2023–24 season.

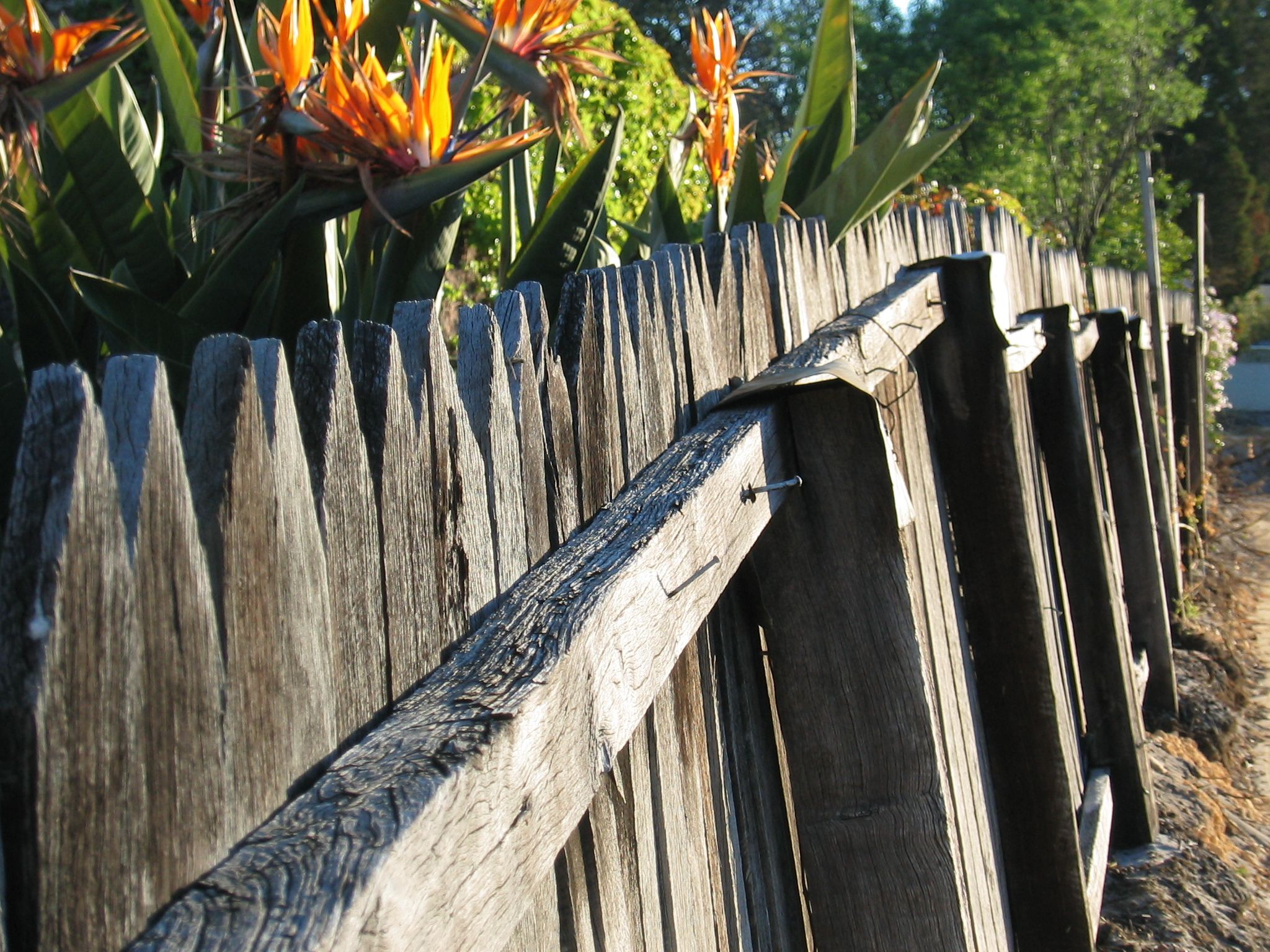
Jarrah was commonly used for fencing in Western Australia.

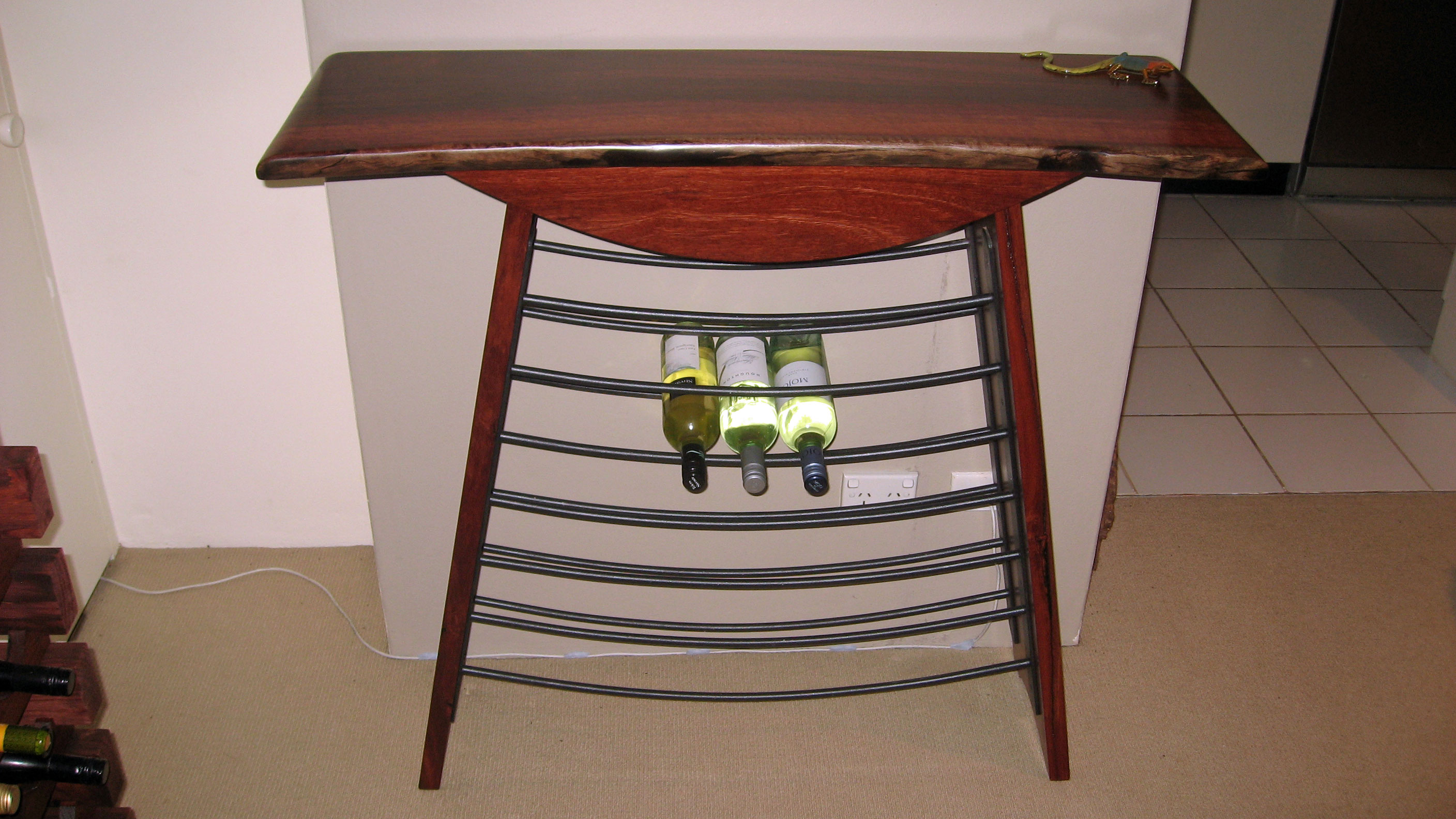
Jarrah wine rack

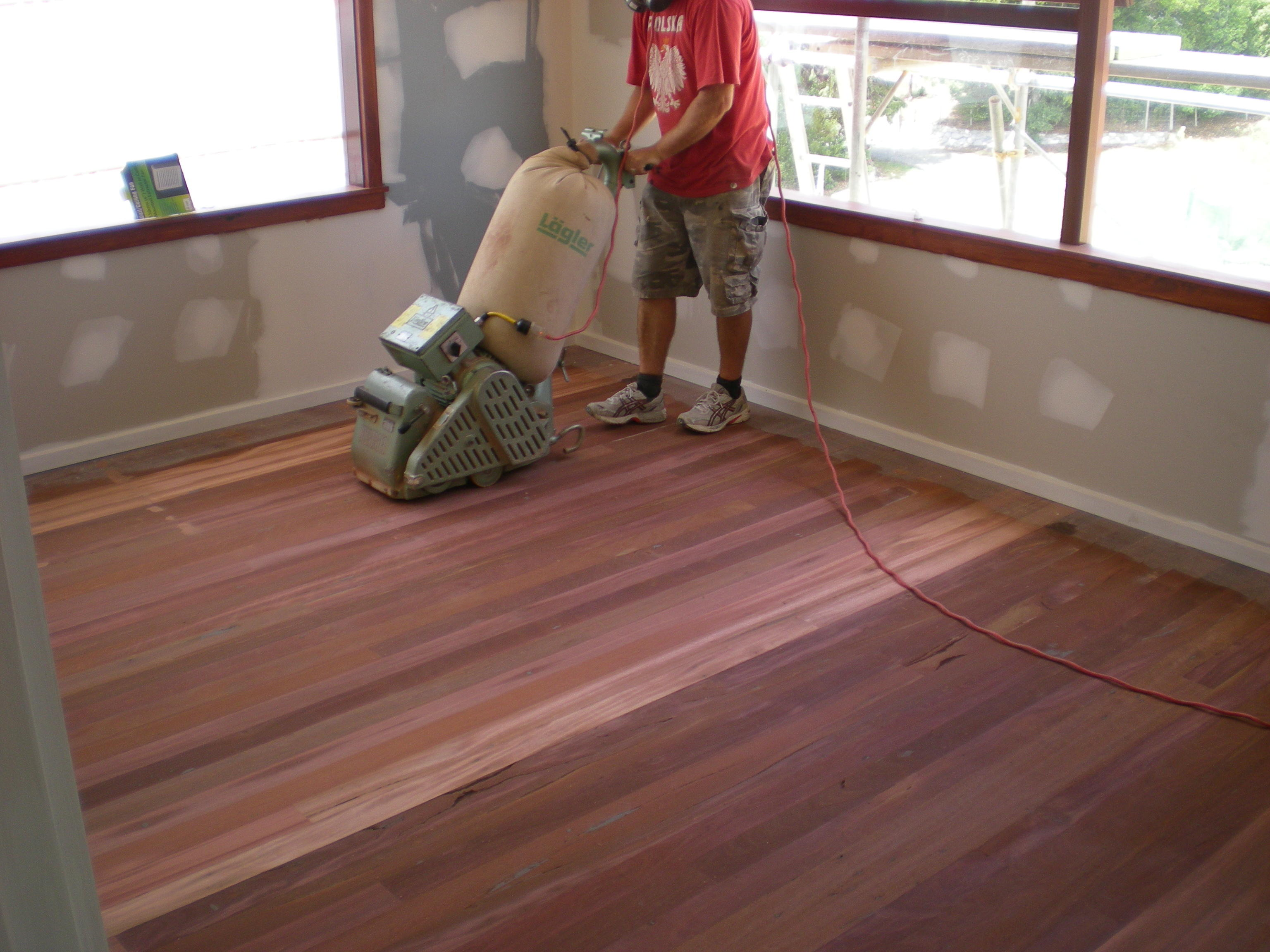
Second-hand jarrah flooring after 80 grit sanding in New Zealand

== See also ==
- Warren bioregion
- Woodchipping in Australia
