= Ulmus × hollandica 'Cicestria' =

Elm cultivar

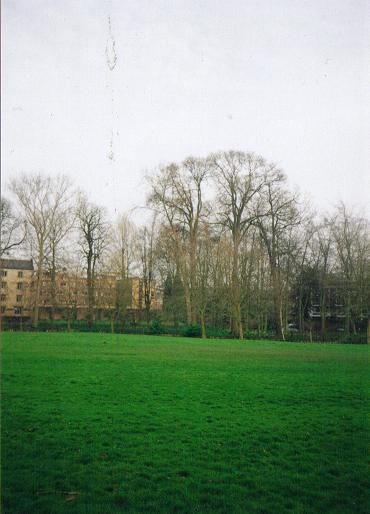
- Two Chichester Elms, Queens' College, Cambridge
- Hybrid parentage: U. glabra × U. minor
- Cultivar: 'Cicestria'
- Origin: Essex, England

The hybrid cultivar Ulmus × hollandica 'Cicestria', commonly known as the 'Chichester Elm', was cloned at the beginning of the 18th century from a tree growing at Chichester Hall, Rawreth, near Danbury, Essex, England, then the home of Thomas Holt White FRS, brother of the naturalist Gilbert White. The tree was first recorded by country parson and botanist Adam Buddle in south-east Essex in 1711, and appeared as U. cicestria in an 1801 catalogue. 'Cicestria' is the original Ulmus × hollandica 'Vegeta' (Lindley, Hortus Cantabrigiensis, 1823), but suffered confusion with the later Huntingdon Elm cultivar by John Claudius Loudon who, without consulting Lindley, accorded the epithet 'Vegeta' to Huntingdon Elm in 1838, as he found the two indistinguishable. J. E. Little in The Journal of Botany (1923) agreed that Buddle's leaves-specimen of Chichester Elm in the Sloane Herbarium seemed to be the same cultivar as Huntingdon Elm: "If so, this elm [Chichester] was in existence and mature some years before the reputed raising of the Huntingdon Elm by Wood of Huntingdon 'about 1746'."

Lindley in A Synopsis of British Flora, arranged according to the Natural Order (1829) appeared to distinguish "the Chichester elm" from "the Giant elm", 'Canadian Giant'.

== Description ==
A very tall tree, with foliage similar to that of the Huntingdon Elm. The Rev. Adam Buddle originally identified the tree as 'a broad-leaved smooth Wych Elm' that grew 'plentifully about Danbury'.

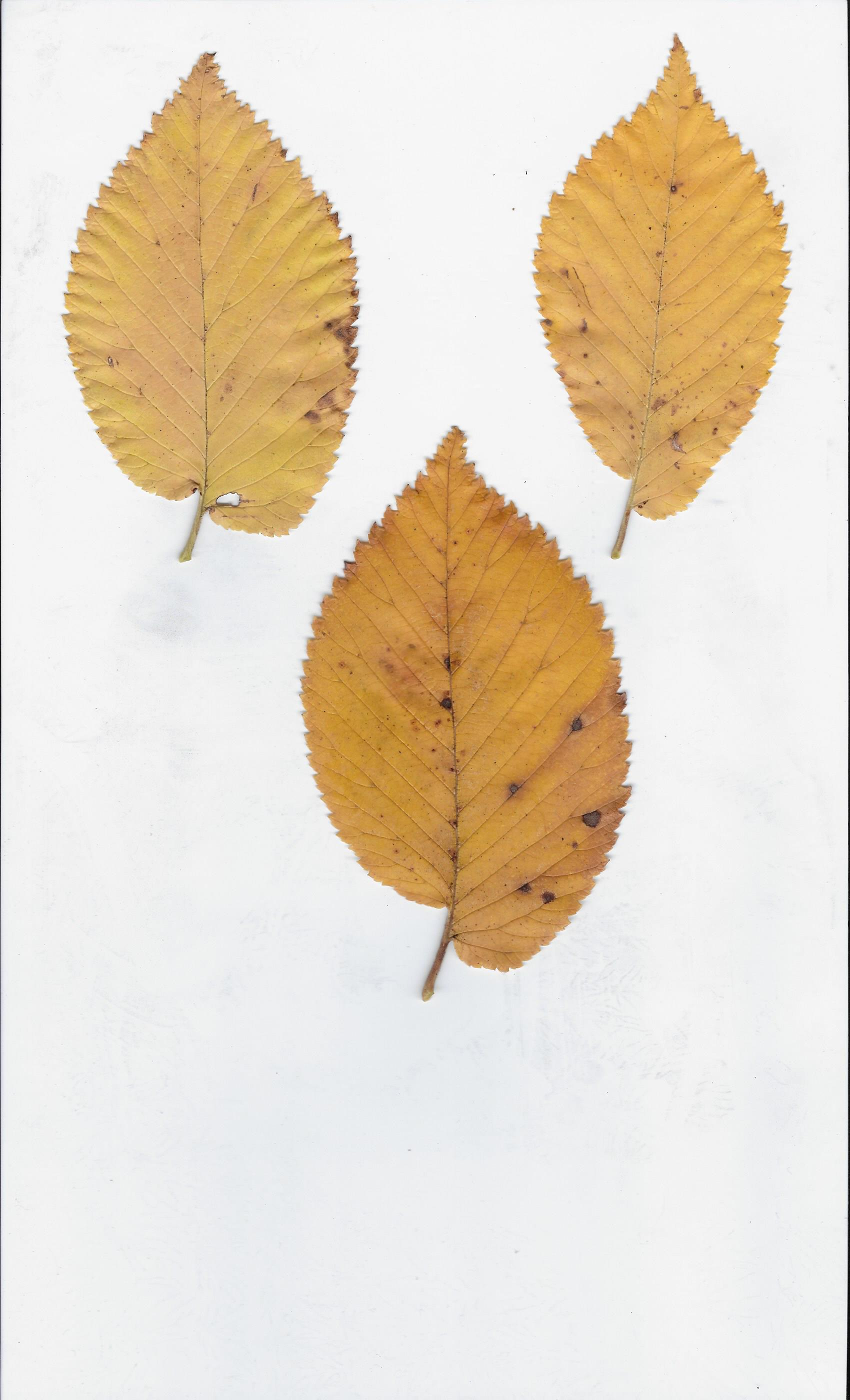
Chichester Elm leaves, Queens' College, Cambridge, November

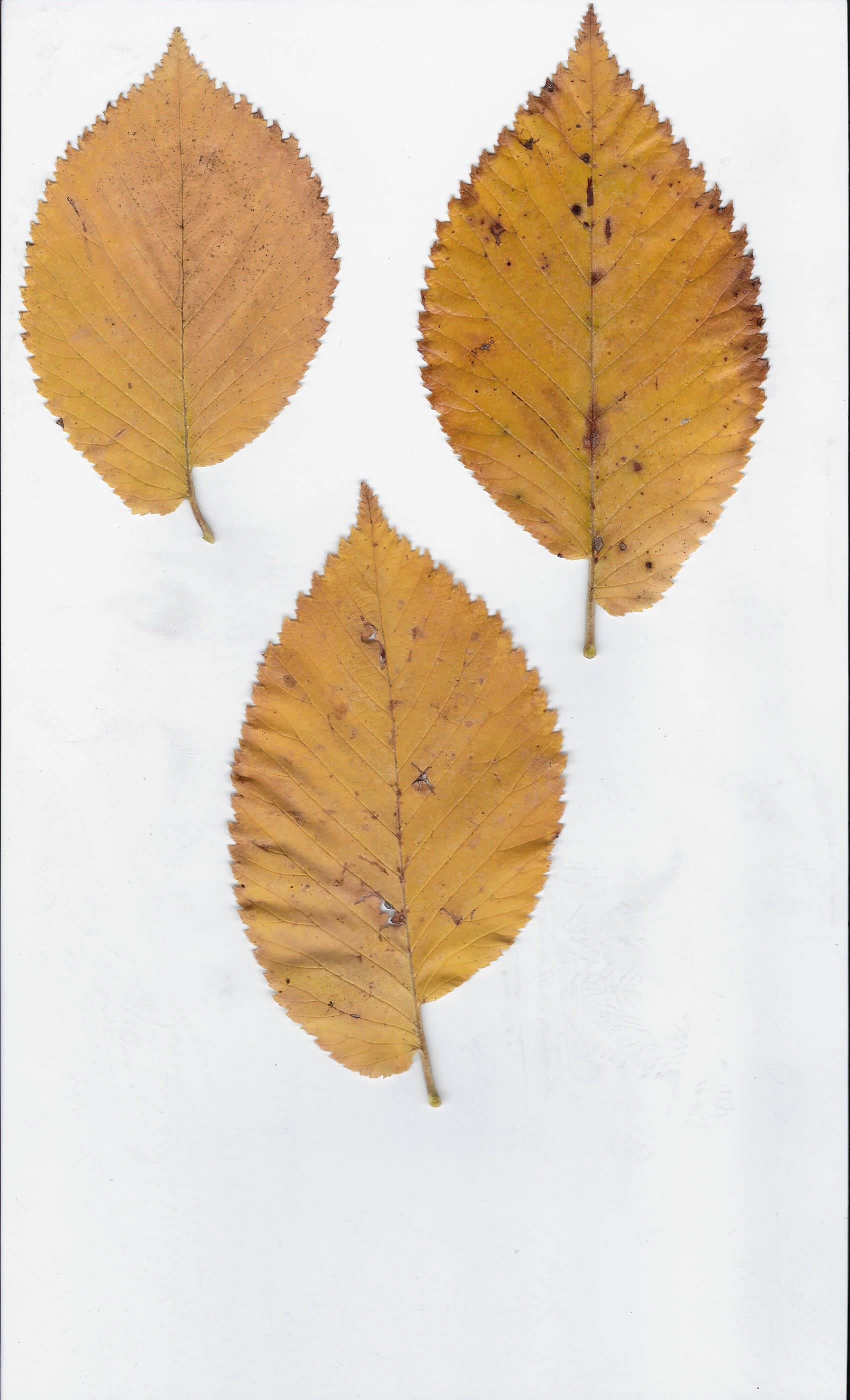
From same trees. Length 5–6 in (13–15 cm) from petiole-end to leaf-tip, width 2.5–3 in (6.4–7.6 cm).

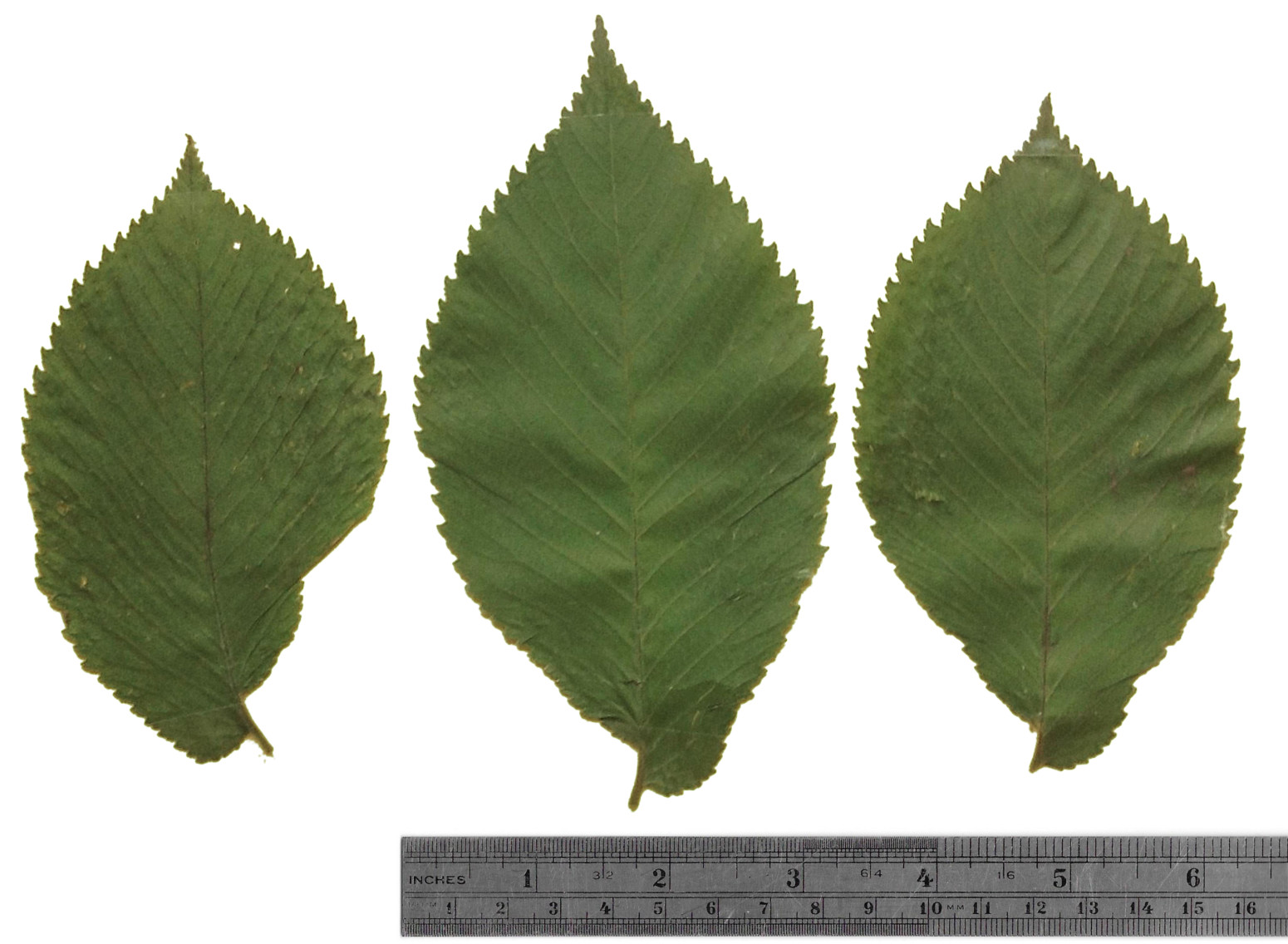
Young Chichester Elm leaves, from saplings cloned from Queens' College trees

A distinguishing feature of 'Vegeta', according to Schneider (1906) and Mitchell (1974), is that the leaf margins to right and left of the petiole start from a vein, not from the midrib. This feature appears in the Queens' College Chichester leaves (see autumn leaves from the old trees, in gallery) and is frequently present in classic chalice-shaped 'Vegeta' elsewhere, assumed to be Huntingdon (see 'Description' gallery, 'Vegeta'). If, however, the feature distinguishes Chichester from Huntingdon, the former may be more common in cultivation than currently believed, having over time been mis-called "Huntingdon". Leaves from Hinchingbrooke Park, the stated source of Huntingdon, collected by Heybroek in 1960 do not show this feature, nor do some old 'Vegeta' cultivars in Oxford and Edinburgh (see ' 'Vegeta'-like cultivars' in Huntingdon article).

== Pests and diseases ==
The tree is susceptible to Dutch elm disease. Its Danbury-area provenance puts it in the Dengie elm group, considered by Oliver Rackham (1986) to have some degree of resilience.

== Cultivation ==
Examples of the tree were presented in 1711 by Adam Buddle to the Chelsea Physic Garden; Buddle held a living at North Fambridge, not far from Rawreth. Adam Holt, relative of Thomas Holt, distributed the elms nationwide in the 1720s. Chichester Elms were planted at Woburn Abbey in the 1720–30s by Thomas Holt, who was agent for the estate, and are recorded in a photograph c.1915 as Ulmus vegeta, 'Huntingdon Elm' [sic.]; they no longer survive. Chichester Elm was marketed as U. cicestria in 1801 by nurseryman George Lindley of Catton, Norwich; his 1815 catalogue lists the tree as U. Cicestriensis. Lindley's son, the eminent botanist John Lindley FRS, had worked in Cambridge as assistant to John Henslow, later Professor of Botany at the University, helping him lay out and catalogue the Cambridge University Botanic Garden. It is possible that the tree owes its Cambridge introduction to John Lindley, whose 1823 revision of Donn's (d. 1813) Hortus Cantabrigiensis contains the first reference, bestowed by him, to the Chichester Elm as U. vegeta.

The claimed North American source of the tree in later 19th-century catalogues almost certainly arose from Loudon's lumping together of Chichester Elm and Huntingdon Elm, for which he noted the synonym 'American elm' adopted by some nurserymen (owing to the similarity in shape) and the Scampston Elm, with its supposed American provenance. There is no record of the tree's introduction to North America, but both an U. montana vegeta and an U. montana Huntingdoni were planted at the Dominion Arboretum, Ottawa, Canada, in 1893, as distinct clones; it is possible that the first was Chichester Elm. Chichester Elm is known to have been marketed in Victoria, Australia, from 1873. In the early 20th century the Gembrook or Nobelius Nursery described it as a large tree of upright growth with broad leaves, listing it separately from Huntingdon Elm and Ulmus 'Canadian Giant'.

== Notable trees ==
... The Jebbs, my great-uncle Dick and my great-aunt Cara, lived at Springfield, at the southern end of the Backs, and their house looked across Queens' Green to the elms behind Queens' College.

– From Gwen Raverat, Period Piece: A Cambridge Childhood (1952).

Two notable examples survive, courtesy of their isolation from diseased stock, at Queens' College, Cambridge, 44 m (144 ft) in height (2009). Annual inoculation with fungicide preserved a third specimen at Chapelfield Gardens, Norwich, until it was blown over in a storm (January 2018). The Queens' College elms, believed to have been planted in the early 19th century, were reproduced in 2009 from cuttings by the National Trust as part of its Plant Conservation Programme, the young trees being distributed in 2017 to various Cambridge colleges and the University Botanic Garden, among other recipients. A specimen planted in the churchyard of St Catherine's, Cocking, West Sussex, was thriving in 2024.

DNA testing by the forestry research team at Roslin in 2013 confirmed that the supposed Chichester Elms in Old Foster Hill Road Cemetery, Bedford (died c.2015), and in Norwich were the same clone as the Queens' trees. The 2013 test did not, however, systematically compare Chichester Elm DNA with that of supposed Huntingdon Elm (it did not include a younger nursery-sourced "Huntingdon" as a control), though an old 'Vegeta'-type hybrid from Castle Acre Priory, Norfolk (girth 4.5 m), was tested and found to be a different clone from Chichester.

An elm in The Grove at Magdalen College, Oxford, photographed by Henry Taunt in 1900, long believed to be a wych elm before being identified by Henry John Elwes as a 'Vegeta'-type hybrid, was for a time the largest elm known in Britain before it was blown down in 1911 (see under U. × hollandica). It measured 44 m tall, its trunk at breast height 2.6 m in diameter, the largest tree of any kind in Britain. However, as Elwes pointed out, its calculated age would place its planting in the late 17th or early 18th century, long before the introduction of the Huntingdon Elm, making the tree in question more likely to be a Chichester Elm. A second tree nearby, described by Elwes as "similar in habit and foliage" and 130 feet (40 m) tall by 23 feet (7.0 m) in girth in 1912, was confirmed by Nellie Bancroft in a Gardener's Chronicle article in 1934 as a 'Vegeta'-type hybrid; it was propagated by Heybroek in 1958 and cultivated at the Baarn elm research institute as clone P41. (Note: Heybroek's clones P41 and P141, also from Magdalen College, were planted in a field trial in the Flevopolder in The Netherlands.) The tree survived until the 1960s. Like the Queens' trees in Cambridge, the Magdalen trees in Oxford were not observed to produce root suckers. The Grove at Magdalen, however, has long been a deer park, and any sucker growth is likely to have been grazed. The now-felled Chichester Elm in Old Foster Hill Road Cemetery, Bedford, is reported to produce root suckers.

== Etymology ==
The tree was almost certainly named for Chichester Hall, where it originated. During the 16th century, the hall was the home of the Andrewes family, one of whom, Lancelot, was Bishop of Chichester from 1605 to 1609.

== Synonymy ==
- U. campestris var. Cicestria: W. A. & J. Mackie, Norwich, Catalogue, 1812, p. 59.
- U. cicestria : George Lindley, Norwich, catalogue, 1801.
- U. Cicestriensis : George Lindley, Norwich, catalogue, 1815.

== Accessions ==
=== Europe ===
- Cambridge University Botanic Garden , University of Cambridge, UK. No accession details available.
