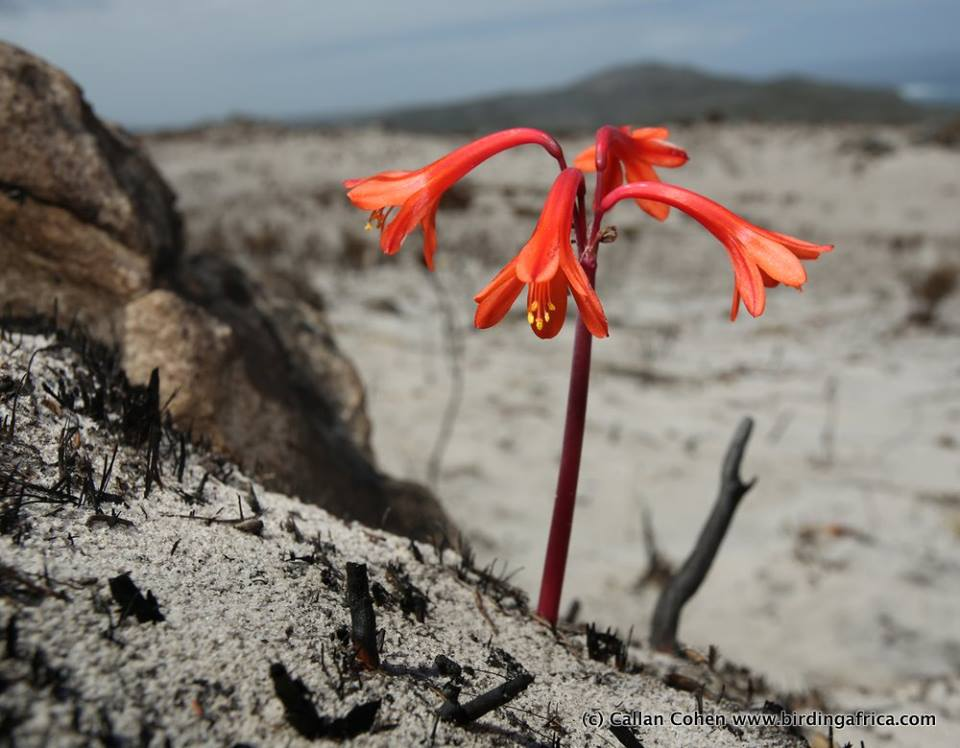

Scientific classification
- Kingdom: Plantae
- Clade: Tracheophytes
- Clade: Angiosperms
- Clade: Monocots
- Order: Asparagales
- Family: Amaryllidaceae
- Subfamily: Amaryllidoideae
- Genus: Cyrtanthus
- Species: C. ventricosus

Binomial name
- Cyrtanthus ventricosus Willd.

Synonyms
- Cyrtanthus pallidus Sims; Cyrtanthus pallidus Sims; Monella pallida (Sims) Herb.; Monella pallida (Sims) Herb. ex Kunth; Monella ventricosa (Willd.) Herb.; Gastronema pallidum (Sims) Lodd.; Gastronema pallidum (Sims) G.Lodd. ex Paxton & J.Harrison; Amaryllis bivaginata Donn; Amaryllis bivaginata Pursh

= Cyrtanthus ventricosus =

Species of flowering plant

Cyrtanthus ventricosus, commonly called fire lily, is a small deciduous, bulbous plant reaching a height of 100–250 mm (3.9–9.8 in). It is in the amaryllis family, Amaryllidaceae, and is found along the Cape Fold Mountains from the Cape Peninsula, Western Cape, to the Kouga Mountains, Eastern Cape in South Africa.

The fire lily produces salmon to scarlet blooms just nine days after fire occurs at the place where the plant stands.

== Description ==
The fire lily produces tubular pink to bright red flowers. Each tepal has a darker strip down the middle. These are borne in an inflorescence containing 1-14 individual flowers. Rarely, a plant will produce two inflorescences. Flowers are most common from December to May, but are only produced after fires, stimulated by the smoke. The flat, black seeds have wings and are dispersed by the wind. The bulbs produce linear leaves every winter (June-August). The leaves and flowers are not present at the same time.

== Ecology ==
This plant flowers after wildfires. The red flowers are clearly visible against the blackened background to butterflies and sunbirds, the main pollinators of this species. They are attracted by the nectar that the flowers produce. Sunbirds sometimes pierce the base of the tube, resulting in them getting the nectar rewards without transferring the pollen between plants. This species has full self-sterility, meaning self-pollinated flowers do not produce seeds.

== Conservation ==
While this plant may only flower after a fire, it is common in its range and the population is considered to be stable. As such, it is listed as Least Concern by the South African National Biodiversity Institute (SANBI).
