= Ulmus × hollandica 'Nottingham' =

Elm cultivar

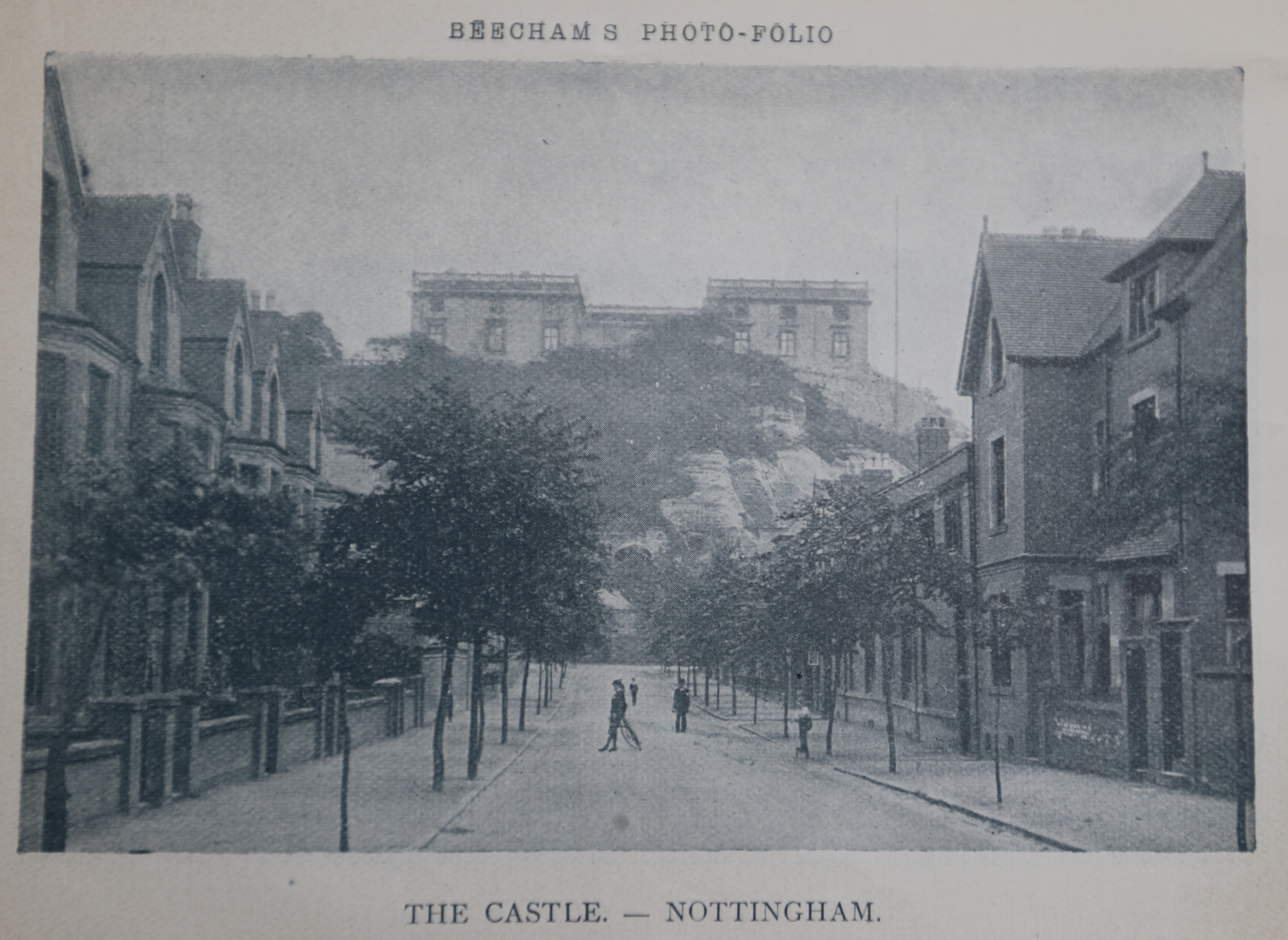
- Nottingham elms in Hope Drive, The Park, Nottingham, c.1900
- Hybrid parentage: U. glabra × U. minor
- Cultivar: 'Nottingham'

Ulmus × hollandica 'Nottingham' is an elm cultivar. It was distributed from the early nineteenth century as 'Siberian elm' by Castle Nurseries, Nottingham, and much planted locally. Richens (1983) described it as a hybrid, possibly of French origin, between wych elm Ulmus glabra and field elm Ulmus minor. He called it Nottingham elm.

It is not known why Castle Nurseries called the cultivar 'Siberian elm', a name widely accepted in Nottingham in the 19th and early 20th centuries (see 'Cultivation'). The species Ulmus pumila Siberian elm was described by Loudon in the 1830s, but specimens are not believed to have been in UK collections or nurseries before the 20th century (see Ulmus pumila § 'Cultivation and uses'). It was, however, cultivated in Spain from the 17th century, where it hybridized with field elm.

Not to be confused with Downton elm, another hybrid cultivar from Nottinghamshire.

== Description ==
The Gardeners' Chronicle (1855) described the cultivar as a vigorous and graceful tree, resembling some of the pendulous elms seen in the eastern counties of England. When young the bark was "almost as smooth as beech", and "the shoot so slender that [the tree] gives one the idea of being a slow-grower; yet it is a plant of enormous growth". The tree was said not to sucker, so did not require grafting. It was propagated by cuttings, which struck almost as readily as those of Lombardy poplar.

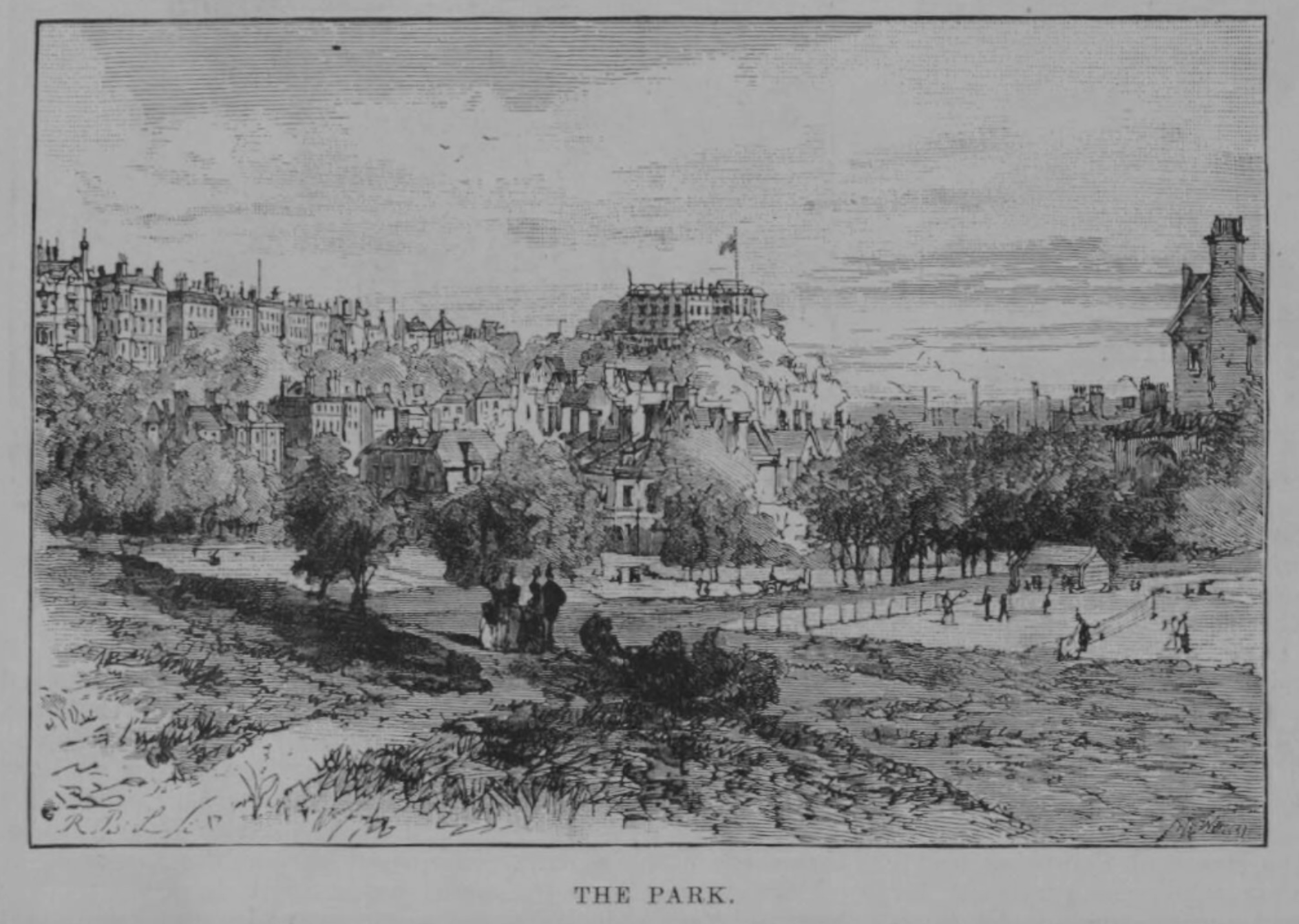
The Park, Nottingham (Illustrated London News, 1888), showing Tennis Drive, Park Terrace and Newcastle Drive, streets planted with the Castle Nurseries clone from the 1850s

No herbarium specimen of Nottingham Elm is known. As the only uncommon British horticultural elm dealt with by Richens (1983) (he ignored such cultivars as Scampston, Downton, Blandford, and Kidbrook), a specimen of its leaves may be among his unsorted all-England collection at the Cambridge University Herbarium in the Sainsbury Laboratory.

== Pests and diseases ==
Hybrid elms of this group are susceptible to Dutch elm disease.

== Cultivation ==
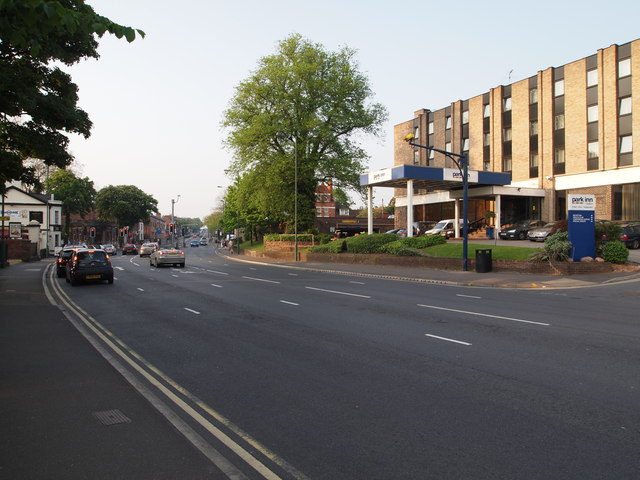
The Mansfield Road elm (2012)

In the mid-19th century the cultivar was present in the park of Highfield House Observatory, home of botanist and astronomer Edward Joseph Lowe (now part of University Park, Nottingham). It alternated with 'Canadian Giant' in an avenue at Chilwell Hall, where it grew twice as quickly as 'Giant'. When Nottingham Park below Nottingham Castle (also known as The Park, Nottingham, now The Park Estate) was turned into a residential area with large houses and gardens, 'Siberian elms' from Castle Nurseries "were freely planted from 1855 along the newly laid out roads, the earliest to be planted being those in Tunnel Road, which got a start of their neighbours". In 1930 local historian J. Holland Walker attributed the "present leafy condition of The Park" to this 1850s' planting of the Castle Nurseries clone. In 1865 the architect Thomas Chambers Hine, writing to the Chairman of the Basford Local Board of Health on the proposed new thoroughfare from Basford to Carrington, recommended for the adjoining footpath "a row of Siberian elms [: 'Nottingham Elm'], planted 25 or 30 feet apart, with proper cradling for the trees when young".

The tree is not known to have been planted outside the Nottingham area.

== Notable trees ==
No specimens are known to survive, but an old semi-pendulous, smooth-leaved, non-suckering elm by the Mercure Hotel, Mansfield Road, Nottingham (2021) (site of the former Park Inn Hotel), a street once lined with villas and planted by the Council from 1863 with the so-called 'Siberian elm' clone, was identified as an Ulmus × hollandica by the Tree Register, and later as a smooth-leaved field elm by The Woodland Trust. Its form recalls the examples of Richens' 'Nottingham Elm' in the Castle and Park areas.
