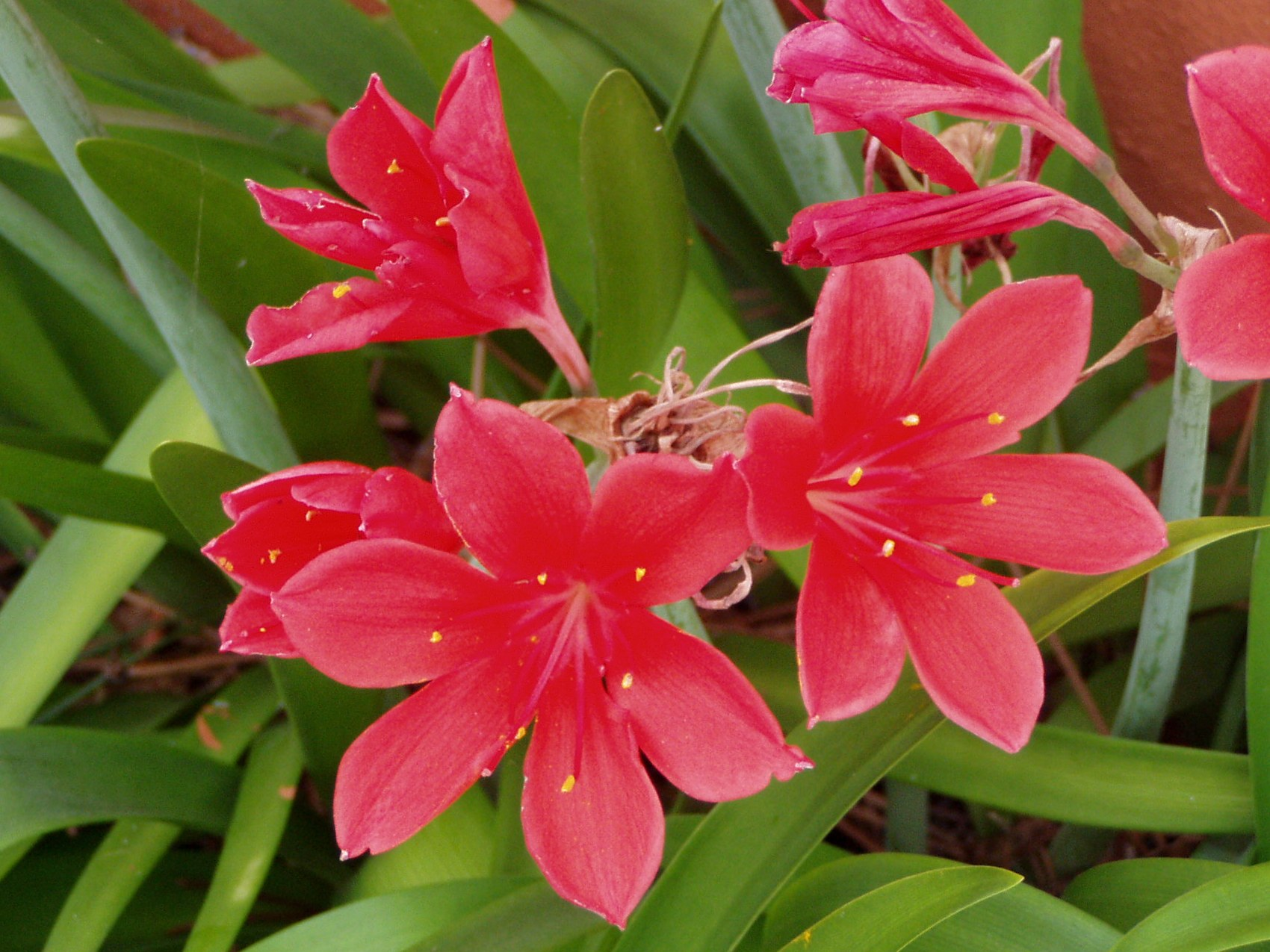

Scientific classification
- Kingdom: Plantae
- Clade: Tracheophytes
- Clade: Angiosperms
- Clade: Monocots
- Order: Asparagales
- Family: Amaryllidaceae
- Subfamily: Amaryllidoideae
- Genus: Cyrtanthus
- Species: C. elatus

Binomial name
- Cyrtanthus elatus (Jacq.) Traub

Synonyms
- Many, including Vallota speciosa (L.f.) T.Durand & Schinz

= Cyrtanthus elatus =

Scarborough lily

Species of flowering plant

Cyrtanthus elatus, the Scarborough lily, is a bulbous flowering plant which originates from the Cape Province of South Africa. Other common names are fire lily and George lily.

Cultivars of the Scarborough lily have flowers which may be bright red, orange, yellow, or occasionally pink or white. The stems can grow to a height of 2 ft (0.61 m). They are relatively easy to grow in a warm, sheltered, frost-free spot. Alternatively, they can be grown under glass in pots. They require either full sun or slight shade. They flower in late summer or early autumn.

The Latin specific epithet elatus means "tall".

This plant has gained the Royal Horticultural Society's Award of Garden Merit (confirmed 2017).

== See also ==
- List of plants known as lily
