= Ulmus × hollandica 'Canadian Giant' =

Elm cultivar

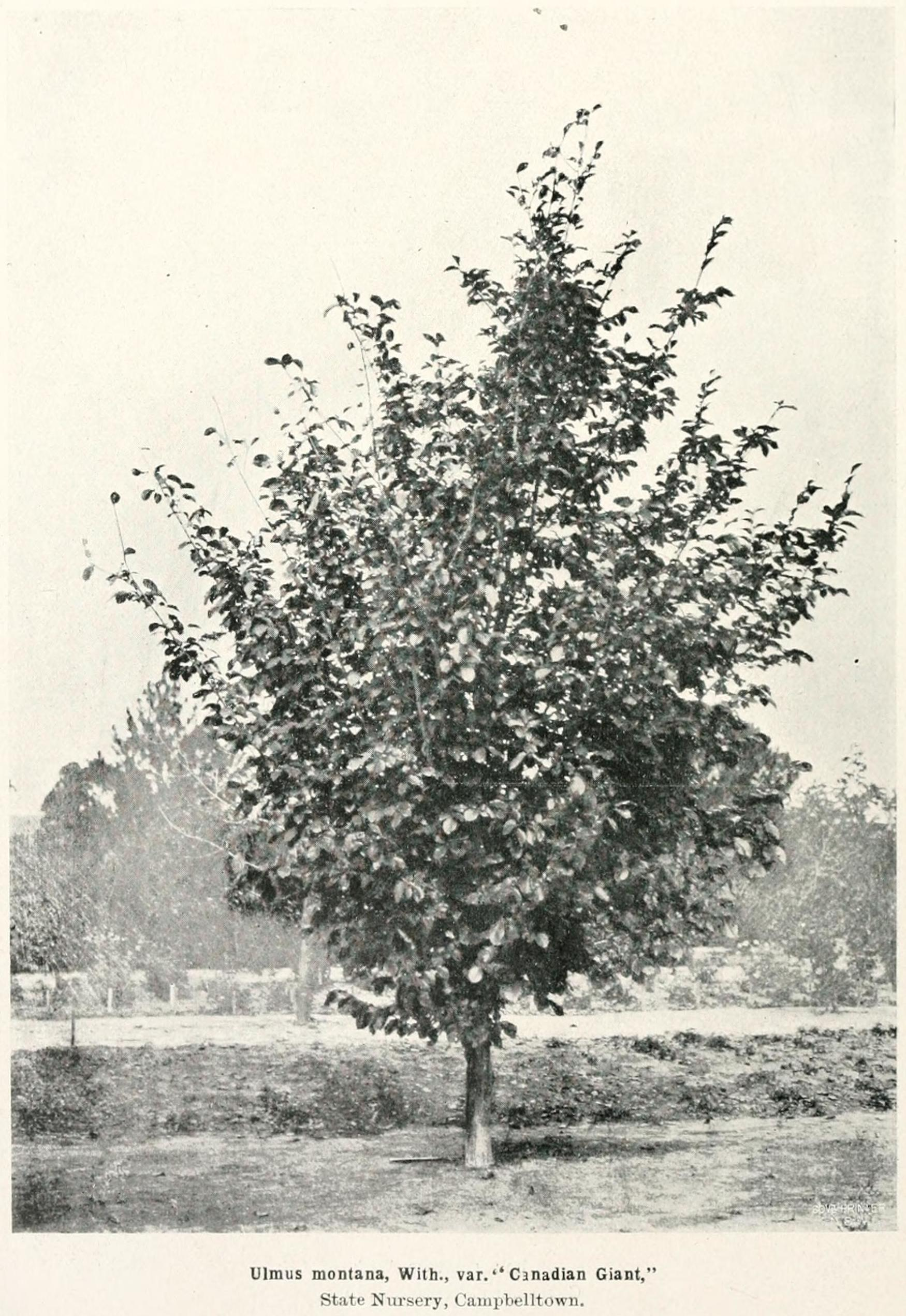
- Ulmus montana 'Canadian Giant', State Nursery, Campbelltown, New South Wales
- Hybrid parentage: U. glabra × U. minor
- Cultivar: 'Canadian Giant'
- Origin: England

The elm cultivar Ulmus × hollandica 'Canadian Giant', the 'Canadensis' of nurseries, was mentioned as Ulmus montana Bauh. var. 'Giant' by Lindley in A synopsis of the British Flora; arranged according to the Natural Orders (1829), without description. At the time, the taxon Ulmus montana was used both for Wych Elm cultivars and for those of Ulmus × hollandica. Lindley appeared to distinguish "the Giant elm" from "the Chichester elm", while in Australia, where it was introduced in the late 19th century, Ulmus montana 'Canadian Giant' was distinguished from Huntingdon Elm. These pairings suggest that 'Canadian Giant' may have been a 'Vegeta'-type hybrid, rather than a wych cultivar, though possibly not synonymous with 'Vegeta' or 'Cicestria'.

It is not known how or when 'Canadian' was added to Lindley's 'Giant elm', but the epithet may be related to the fact that the horticulturalist William Barron, who distributed the elm as 'Giant' or 'Canadensis' (see 'Cultivation'), was head gardener at Elvaston Castle in Derbyshire to Charles Stanhope, 4th Earl of Harrington whose father, the third earl, had served in the Canadian wars.

== Description ==
U. montana 'Canadian Giant', described as "rather more spreading than the ordinary form" of U. montana, was noted for its fast growth. In Australia it was said to be more vigorous than Huntingdon Elm ("the fastest grower of the elms in Sydney except the 'Canadian Giant'"). The Gembrook or Nobelius Nursery 1918 catalogue described 'Canadian Elm' as "a good street tree of rapid growth", listing it separately from Chichester Elm and Huntingdon Elm.

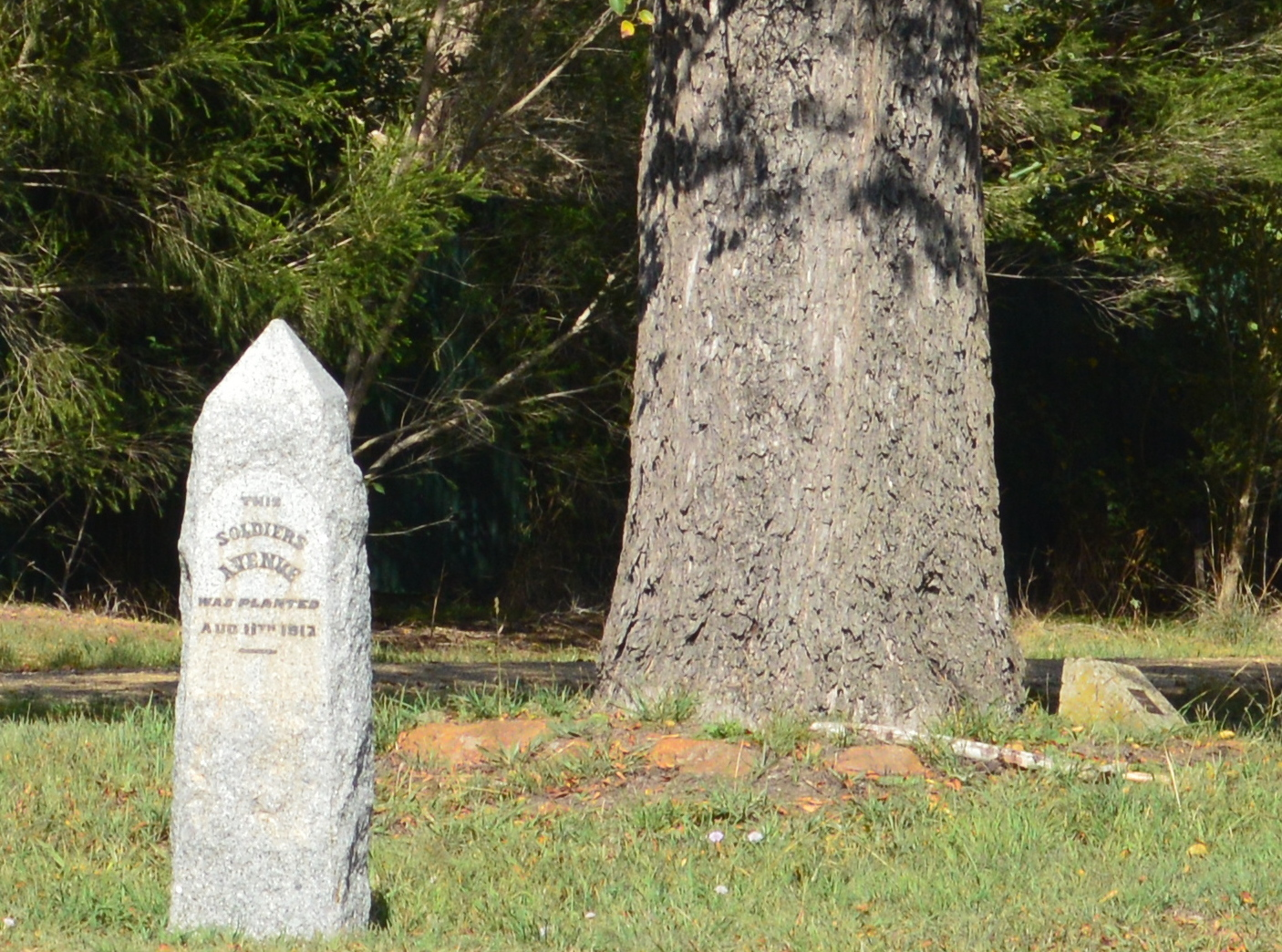
Bole of 'Canadian Giant' beside 1917 date-stone, Avenue of Honour, Digby, Victoria

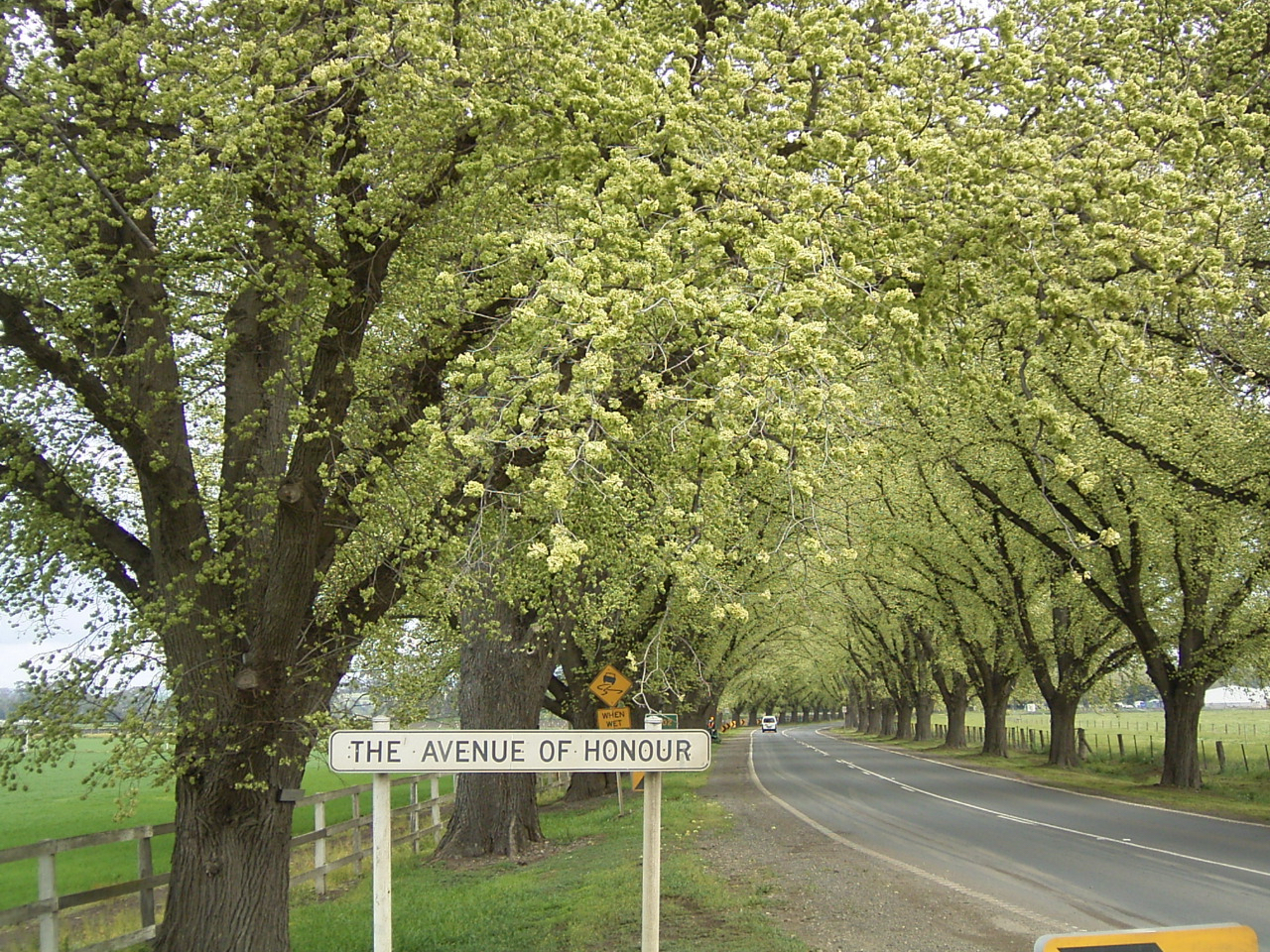
'Canadian Giant' fruiting, September, Bacchus Marsh Avenue of Honour, Victoria

== Pests and diseases ==
Not known.

== Cultivation ==
'Canadian Giant' was in English nurseries in Lindley's day. In the mid-19th century 'Giant' and 'Nottingham Elm' alternated in an avenue near Chilwell Hall, Nottinghamshire, 'Giant' growing only half as quickly as 'Nottingham'. It was distributed by a number of nurseries in England by the 1860s and '70s, including Handsworth's of Sheffield, which advertised 'Giant or Canadian Elms', and William Barron's of Borrowash, as 'Giant' or 'Canadensis'. It may have been the 'Black Canadian' elm in the list of Lawson's of Edinburgh in the 1830s. U. montana 'Canadian Giant' was cultivated in Australia from the late 19th century, where it appeared separately from Chichester Elm and Huntingdon Elm in an 1873 nursery list, as Ulmus 'Canadian' or 'Canadian Giant'; a second nursery used Ulmus canadiensis from 1889. In the early 20th century a specimen stood beside Government House, Sydney, on the sloping lawn nearest the house, looking towards the sea. One of the earliest Avenues of Honour in Australia, at Digby, Victoria (begun 1917), was planted with 87 'Canadian Elm', "which has proved itself at home in this district". 'Canadian Giant' elms were included in the original plantings of the Ballarat Avenue of Honour after the Great War, but it is not known whether they survive there. Some surviving elms in the Bacchus Marsh Avenue of honour are believed to be 'Canadian Elm' (see 'Notable trees'). None are known in England.

== Notable trees ==
The Avenue of Honour in Bacchus Marsh, Victoria, was planted after the Great War with 281 U. × hollandica, a mixture of what the newspaper articles of the time called 'Canadian Elm' or 'Giant Canadian Elm', and a second unnamed Dutch elm. Moorabool Shire Council referred to the two clones in 2004, without having confirmed the cultivar name of either, as the "larger" and the "smaller" clone, a distinction visible in photographs of the avenue (2017). The leaves of the larger clone are indistinguishable from those of 'Vegeta'. Comparison with the Avenue of Honour at Digby, Victoria, planted solely with 'Canadian Elm', and with an Ulmus canadensis herbarium specimen in the Muséum National d'Histoire Naturelle, Paris (see 'External links'), confirms that the smaller clone in the Bacchus Marsh avenue is this cultivar. The Bacchus Marsh elms were propagated in the early 21st century to provide replacements of the same clones.

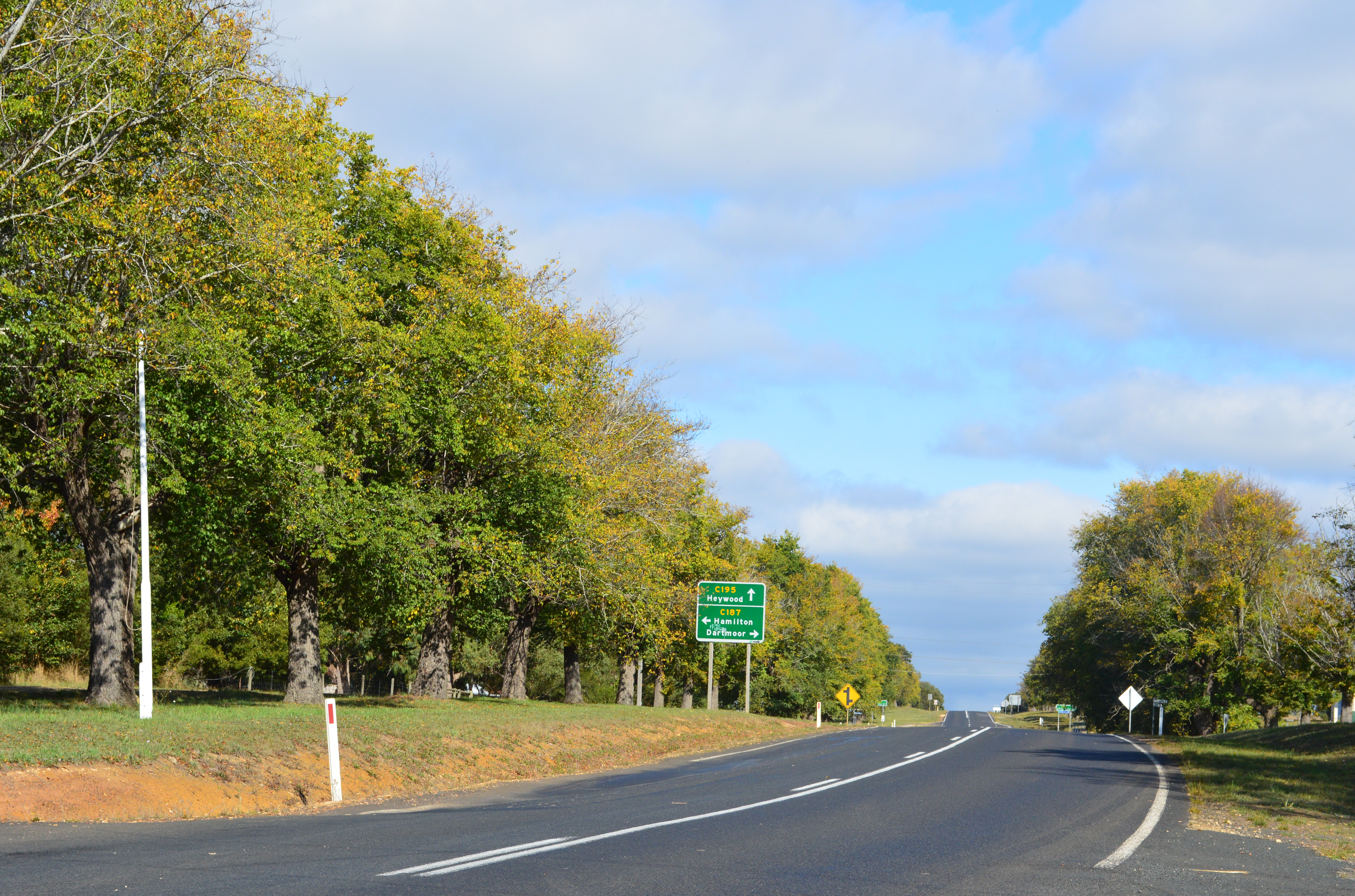
'Canadian Elm' / 'Canadian Giant', Avenue of Honour, Digby, Victoria (2015), grown back after pruning

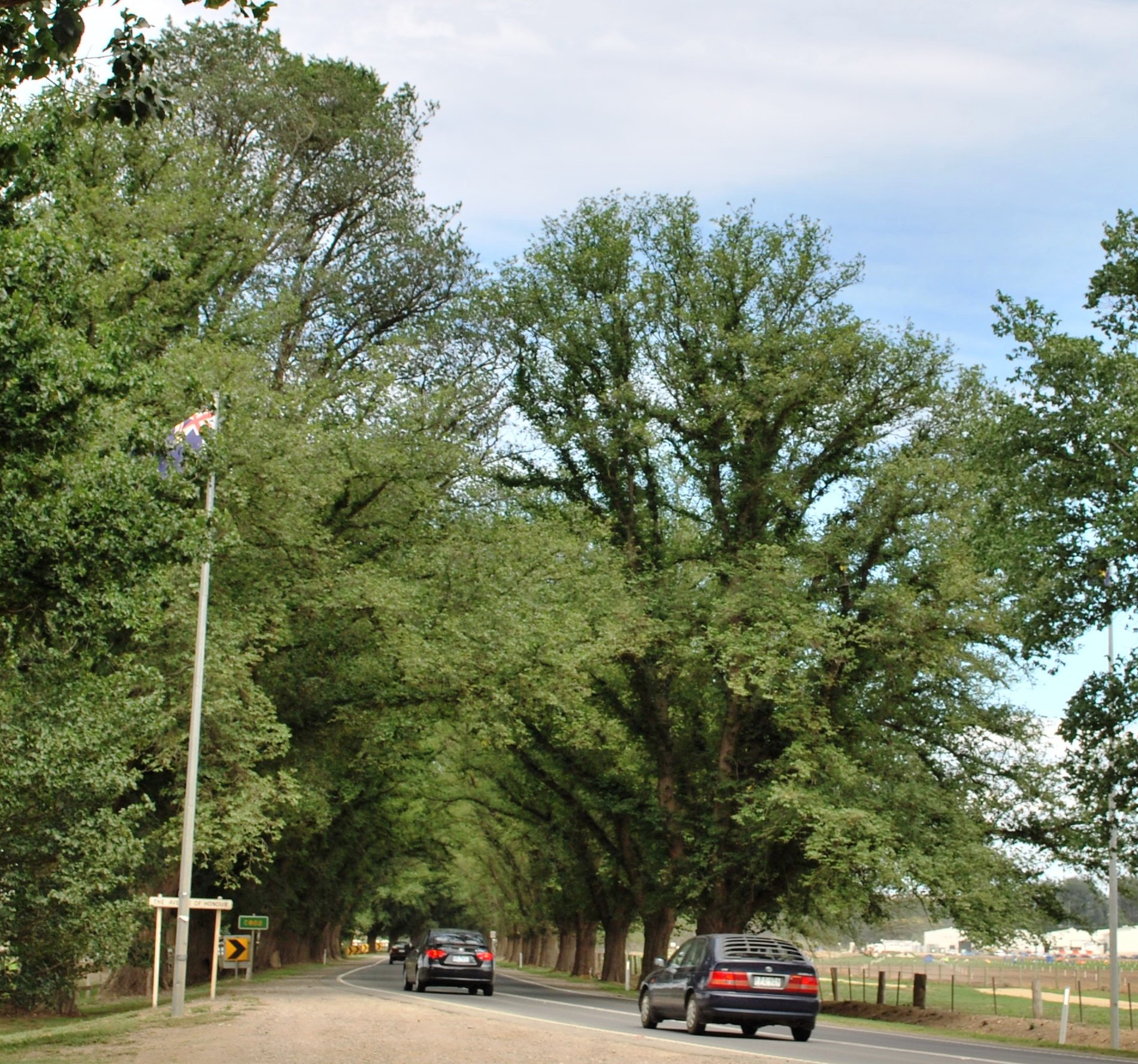
'Canadian Elm' / 'Canadian Giant' (right), 'Vegeta' (left), Avenue of Honour, Bacchus Marsh, Victoria (2008)

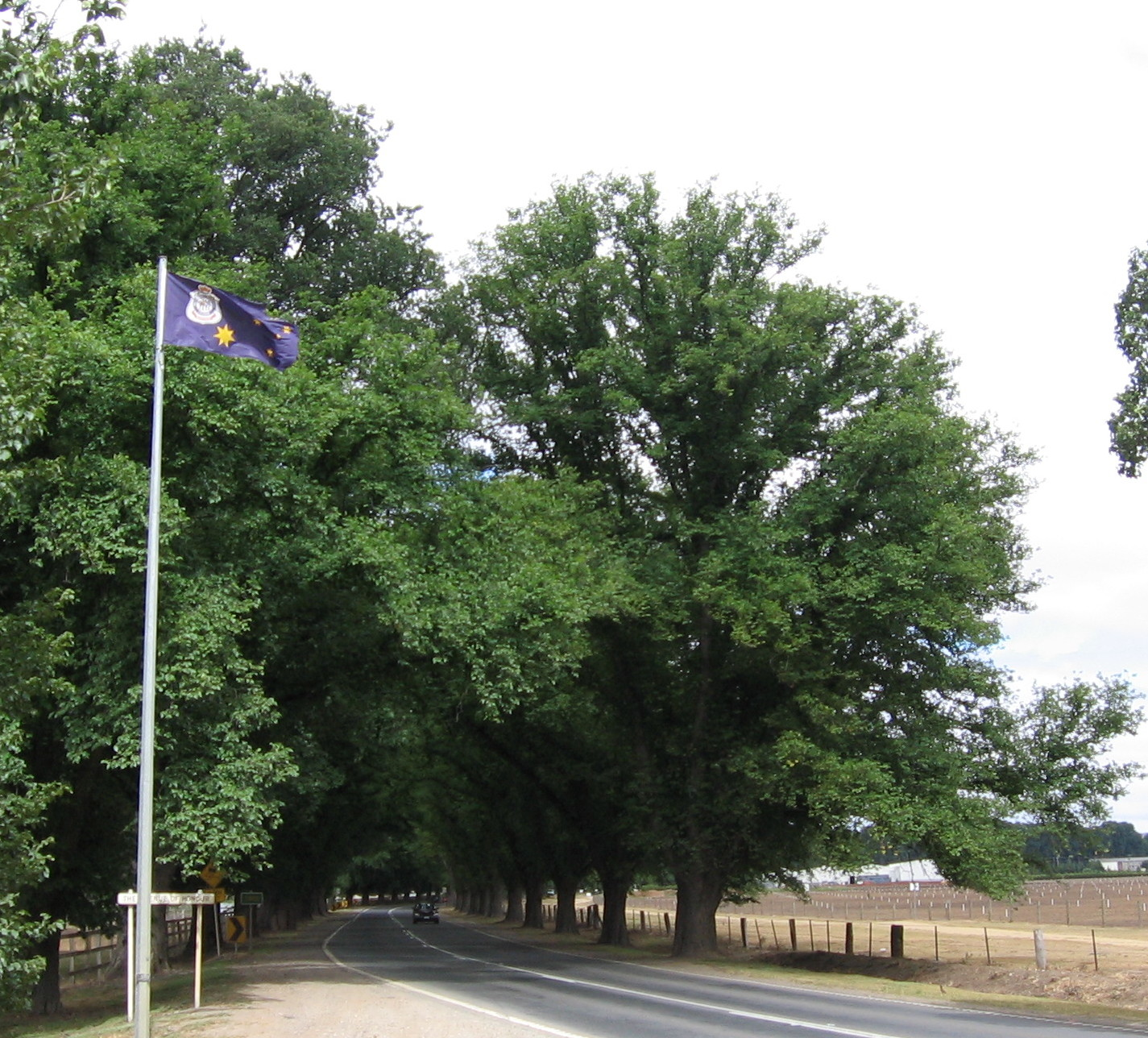
Same (2006)
