= Dunn Brothers =

Dunn Brothers may refer to:

- Dunn Brothers (bounty hunters), Old West bounty hunters
- Dunn Bros, an American coffeehouse franchise
- Dunn Brothers (construction contractors), St. Louis, Missouri builders of the Wachter Motor Car Company Building
