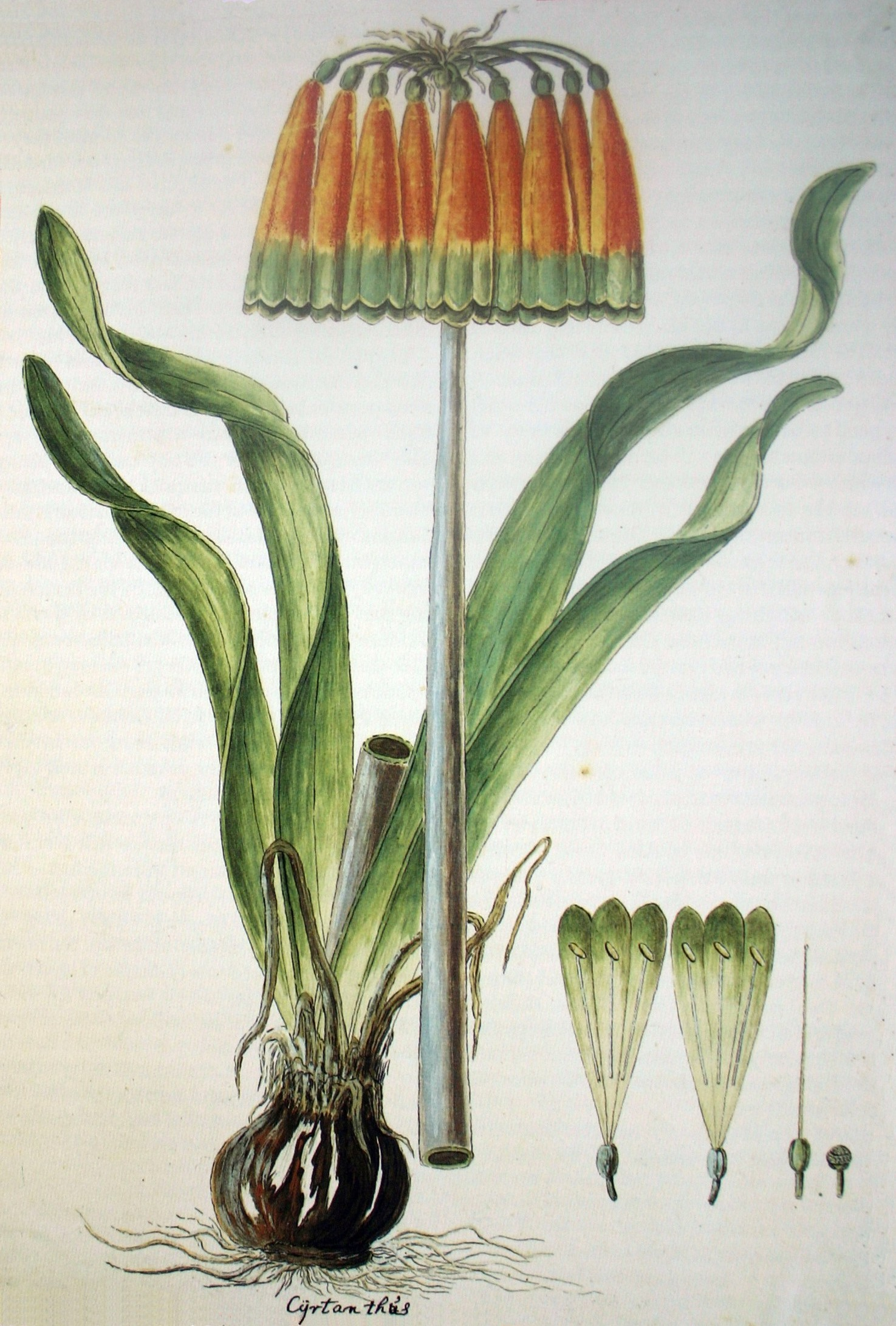

Scientific classification
- Kingdom: Plantae
- Clade: Tracheophytes
- Clade: Angiosperms
- Clade: Monocots
- Order: Asparagales
- Family: Amaryllidaceae
- Subfamily: Amaryllidoideae
- Genus: Cyrtanthus
- Species: C. obliquus

Binomial name
- Cyrtanthus obliquus (L.f.) Aiton

Synonyms
- Amaryllis umbella L'Hér.; Crinum obliquum L.f.; Cyrtanthus varius M.Roem.; Timmia obliqua (L.f.) J.F.Gmel.

= Cyrtanthus obliquus =

Knysna lily

Species of flowering plant

Cyrtanthus obliquus, the Knysna lily, is a species of flowering plant in the amaryllis family. It has spiralling leaves and large pendulous flowers. It is native to coastal grasslands from KwaZulu-Natal to the Eastern Cape, South Africa.

It is adapted to a dry winter period in its native range (March to August), and is able to survive in hot, dry conditions. Its thick, greyish leaves are also adapted to this sunny environment. It is a popular container plant. It can be multiplied by removing and planting side bulbs, when these appear.
