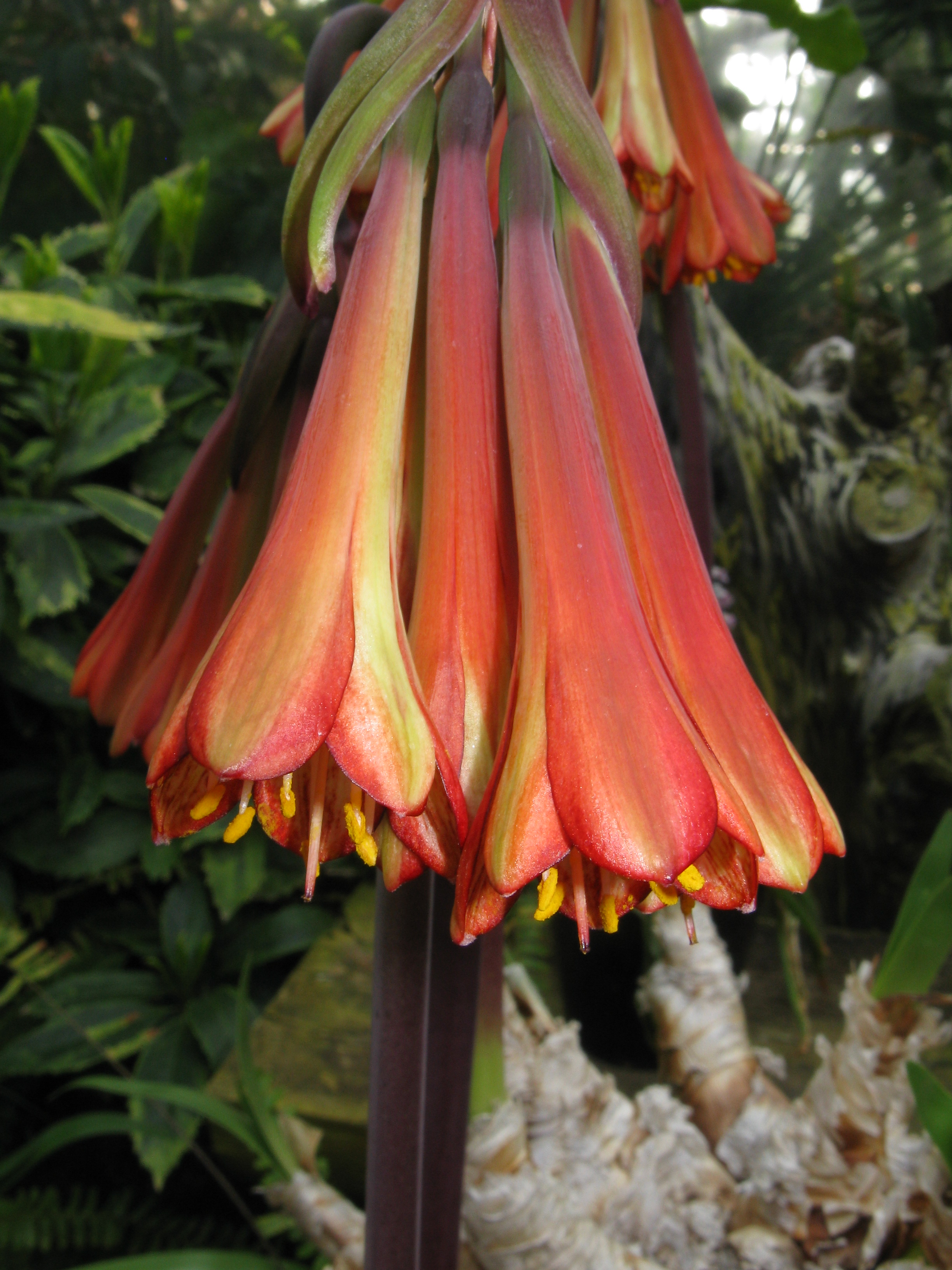
- Osaka Prefectural Flower Garden

Scientific classification
- Kingdom: Plantae
- Clade: Tracheophytes
- Clade: Angiosperms
- Clade: Monocots
- Order: Asparagales
- Family: Amaryllidaceae
- Subfamily: Amaryllidoideae
- Genus: Cyrtanthus
- Species: C. falcatus

Binomial name
- Cyrtanthus falcatus R.A.Dyer

= Cyrtanthus falcatus =

Species of flowering plant

Cyrtanthus falcatus, the falcate fire lily, is a species of flowering plant in the amaryllis family Amaryllidaceae from the Natal region of South Africa. A bulbous perennial growing to 30 cm (12 in), it has glossy, strap-shaped leaves and erect burgundy-coloured stems. These bear umbels of 8-10 narrowly flared, pendulous tubular flowers in shades of red, green and cream in spring and summer. The umbels are bent over in a curious crook or sickle shape (hence The Latin specific epithet falcatus, "shaped like a sickle"). The plant goes dormant in winter. The bulb, shaped like a bowling pin, rests with its neck above the soil line.

== Habitat ==
The bulb is only known to grow at altitudes of up to 1,800 m (5,900 ft) on vertical cliffs, in the Drakensberg escarpment of the KwaZulu-Natal midlands, where the bulb is found between vertical or horizontal slabs of stone. It is probably pollinated by sunbirds.

== Cultivation ==
The plant is not frost-hardy, but may be grown outdoors in a warm, sheltered location in temperate regions. Alternatively it may be grown under glass, with bright filtered sunlight. In cultivation in the UK, C. falcatus has gained the Royal Horticultural Society's Award of Garden Merit (confirmed 2017)
