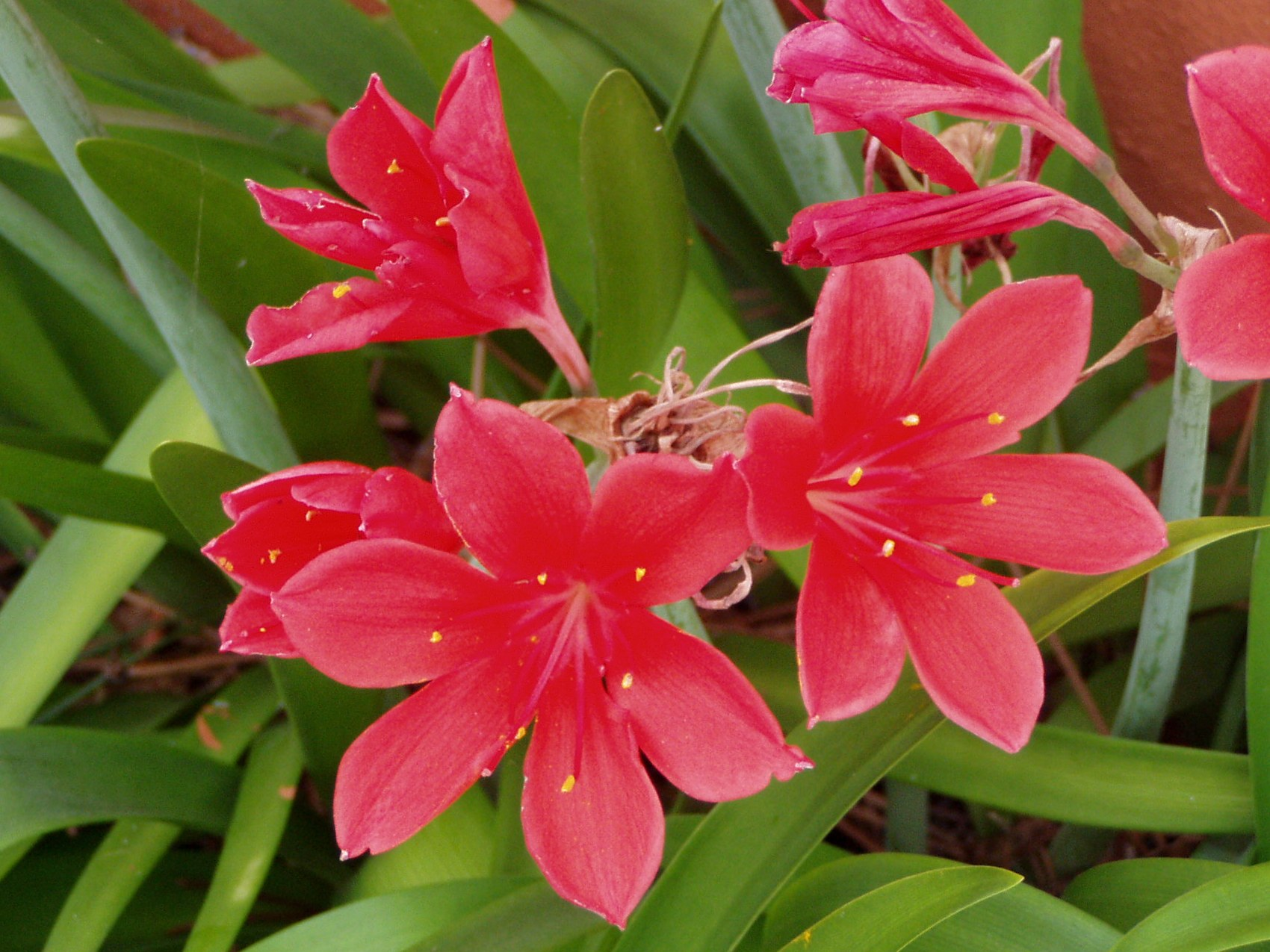
- Cyrtanthus elatus

Scientific classification
- Kingdom: Plantae
- Clade: Tracheophytes
- Clade: Angiosperms
- Clade: Monocots
- Order: Asparagales
- Family: Amaryllidaceae
- Subfamily: Amaryllidoideae
- Tribe: Cyrtantheae
- Genus: Cyrtanthus; W.Aiton 1789, conserved name not Schreb. 1789 (Rubiaceae)

Type species
- Cyrtanthus angustifolius W.Aiton

Synonyms
- Cyrtanthinae; Anoiganthus Baker; Vallota Salisb. ex Herb.; Timmia J.F.Gmel.; Gastronema Herb.; Monella Herb.; Cyphonema Herb.; Eusipho Salisb.; × Vallanthus Cif. & Giacom.

= Cyrtanthus =

Genus of flowering plants

Cyrtanthus is a genus of perennial, herbaceous and bulbous plants in the family Amaryllidaceae, subfamily Amaryllidoideae.

== Taxonomy ==
Cyrtanthus is the sole genus in the African tribe Cyrtantheae.

=== Phylogeny ===
The placement of Cyrtantheae within subfamily Amaryllidoideae is shown in the following cladogram:

Cladogram: Tribes of subfamily Amaryllidoideae

- Subfamily Amaryllidoideae
  - Africa
    Tribe Amaryllideae
  - - - Africa
        Tribe Cyrtantheae
      - - Africa
          Tribe Haemantheae
        - Australasia
          Tribe Calostemmateae
    - - Eurasian clade
        - Asia
          Tribe Lycorideae
        - Mediterranean
          - Tribe Galantheae
          - - Tribe Pancratieae
            - Tribe Narcisseae
      - American clade
        - Hippeastroid clade
          - Tribe Griffineae
          - Tribe Hippeastreae
        - Andean clade
          - - Tribe Eustephieae
          - - Tribe Eucharideae/Stenomesseae
            - - - Tribe Clinantheae
                - Tribe Hymenocallideae

=== Subdivision ===
There are over 50 recognized species, all native to central and southern Africa.

- Cyrtanthus angustifolius
- Cyrtanthus attenuatus
- Cyrtanthus aureolinus
- Cyrtanthus bicolor
- Cyrtanthus brachyscyphus
- Cyrtanthus brachysiphon
- Cyrtanthus breviflorus
- Cyrtanthus carneus
- Cyrtanthus clavatus
- Cyrtanthus collinus
- Cyrtanthus contractus
- Cyrtanthus debilis
- Cyrtanthus elatus
- Cyrtanthus epiphyticus
- Cyrtanthus erubescens
- Cyrtanthus eucallus
- Cyrtanthus falcatus
- Cyrtanthus fergusoniae
- Cyrtanthus flammosus
- Cyrtanthus flanaganii
- Cyrtanthus flavus
- Cyrtanthus galpinii
- Cyrtanthus guthrieae
- Cyrtanthus helictus
- Cyrtanthus herrei
- Cyrtanthus huttonii
- Cyrtanthus inaequalis
- Cyrtanthus junodii
- Cyrtanthus labiatus
- Cyrtanthus leptosiphon
- Cyrtanthus leucanthus
- Cyrtanthus loddigesianus
- Cyrtanthus mackenii
- Cyrtanthus macmasteri
- Cyrtanthus macowanii
- Cyrtanthus montanus
- Cyrtanthus nutans
- Cyrtanthus obliquus
- Cyrtanthus obrienii
- Cyrtanthus ochroleucus
- Cyrtanthus odorus
- Cyrtanthus rhodesianus
- Cyrtanthus rhododactylus
- Cyrtanthus rotundilobus
- Cyrtanthus sanguineus
- Cyrtanthus smithiae
- Cyrtanthus spiralis
- Cyrtanthus staadensis
- Cyrtanthus stenanthus
- Cyrtanthus striatus
- Cyrtanthus suaveolens
- Cyrtanthus thorncroftii
- Cyrtanthus tuckii
- Cyrtanthus ventricosus
- Cyrtanthus wellandii
- Cyrtanthus welwitschii

== Bibliography ==
- "Amaryllidaceae: A taxonomic tool for the Amaryllidaceae of the world". eMonocot. Archived from the original on 2016-03-04.
