= Duns =

Duns may refer to:

- Duns, Scottish Borders, a town in Berwickshire, Scotland
  - Duns railway station
  - Duns F.C., a football club
  - Dundonald F.C., a football club known as "The Duns"
  - Dundela F.C., a football club known as "The Duns"
  - Duns RFC, a rugby football club
  - Battle of Duns, an engagement fought in 1372
- Duns Scotus (c. 1265/66–1308), Scottish philosopher
  - Duns or Dunsman, see Scotism
- Düns, municipality in the Austrian state of Vorarlberg
- DUNS (Data Universal Numbering System)

== People with the surname ==
- Jeremy Duns (born 1973), a British author
- Len Duns (1916–1989), an English footballer

== See also ==
- Duns Creek, New South Wales, Australia
- Duns Tew, Oxfordshire, England
- Dun (disambiguation)
