= Dunn's Bakery =

Bakery in north London, England

Dunn's Bakery is a bakery in Crouch End, north London, England, established as a bakery in 1850 and owned and operated by six generations of the Freeman family since 1946. It has been described in food and travel press as one of the oldest bakeries in London.

== History ==
The Freeman family's baking history dates to 1820, when Robert Freeman moved from Brackley, Northamptonshire, to Highgate, north London, and found work as a baker. In 1827 he opened his own bakery on Highgate Hill.

The premises on the Broadway in Crouch End that would become Dunn's Bakery was built as a bakery in 1850 and was originally run by the Dunn family until the 1920s. The business was formally incorporated as Dunns (Crouch End) Limited on 22 June 1928, while still under Dunn family ownership. In 1946, Robert Freeman's great-grandson David Freeman bought the business, bringing it into the Freeman family.

David's son, Christopher Freeman, joined the business in 1973 after training at the National Bakery School, becoming the fifth generation of the family to work as a baker. In 2017, Christopher stepped back from day-to-day involvement and passed leadership of the bakery to his son, Lewis Freeman, the sixth generation of the family to run the business.

A second branch opened in Muswell Hill, north London, in 2020.

== Operations ==
As of the mid-2020s, Dunn's employs around 65 staff across its Crouch End and Muswell Hill sites, and also operates a wholesale arm. The bakery produces bread, sourdough, cakes, pastries and savoury items. It also has a sandwich and catering counter.

== Media appearances ==
In 2016, Dunn's Bakery featured in the BBC Two documentary series Victorian Bakers, in which the bakery's Crouch End premises was used to represent a bakery of the year 1900, owing to its use of vintage gas-fired ovens still in operation at the time. The bakery has also been reported to have appeared in the first series of ITV's Britain's Best Bakery (2012).

In November 2018, Dunn's Bakery featured in Visa UK's first Christmas television advertising campaign, which spotlighted independent British high-street retailers. The advert aired during Coronation Street on ITV and showed nine shopkeepers, including Dunn's Bakery owner Christopher Freeman, lip-syncing to Mariah Carey's "All I Want for Christmas Is You".

In 2020, a bus-shaped birthday cake made by Dunn's Bakery featured in the BBC America/BBC Three thriller series Killing Eve, sent by the character Villanelle (Jodie Comer) to Eve Polastri (Sandra Oh) in the episode "Still Got It" (series 3, episode 4). Bakery owner Lewis Freeman said members of the show's production crew, who lived in Crouch End, had asked to feature the bakery.

== Community involvement ==
Dunn's Bakery is credited as the founder of National Doughnut Week, an annual UK-wide fundraising campaign for the children's charity The Children's Trust. The campaign was launched in 1991 or 1992 by Christopher Freeman, then co-owner of Dunn's Bakery, and has since grown to involve other food businesses across the UK. As of October 2025, the campaign had raised over £1.18 million in total since its inception, including more than £672,000 donated directly to The Children's Trust.

== See also ==
- List of bakeries
