= Wachter Motor Car Company Building =

- U.S. National Register of Historic Places
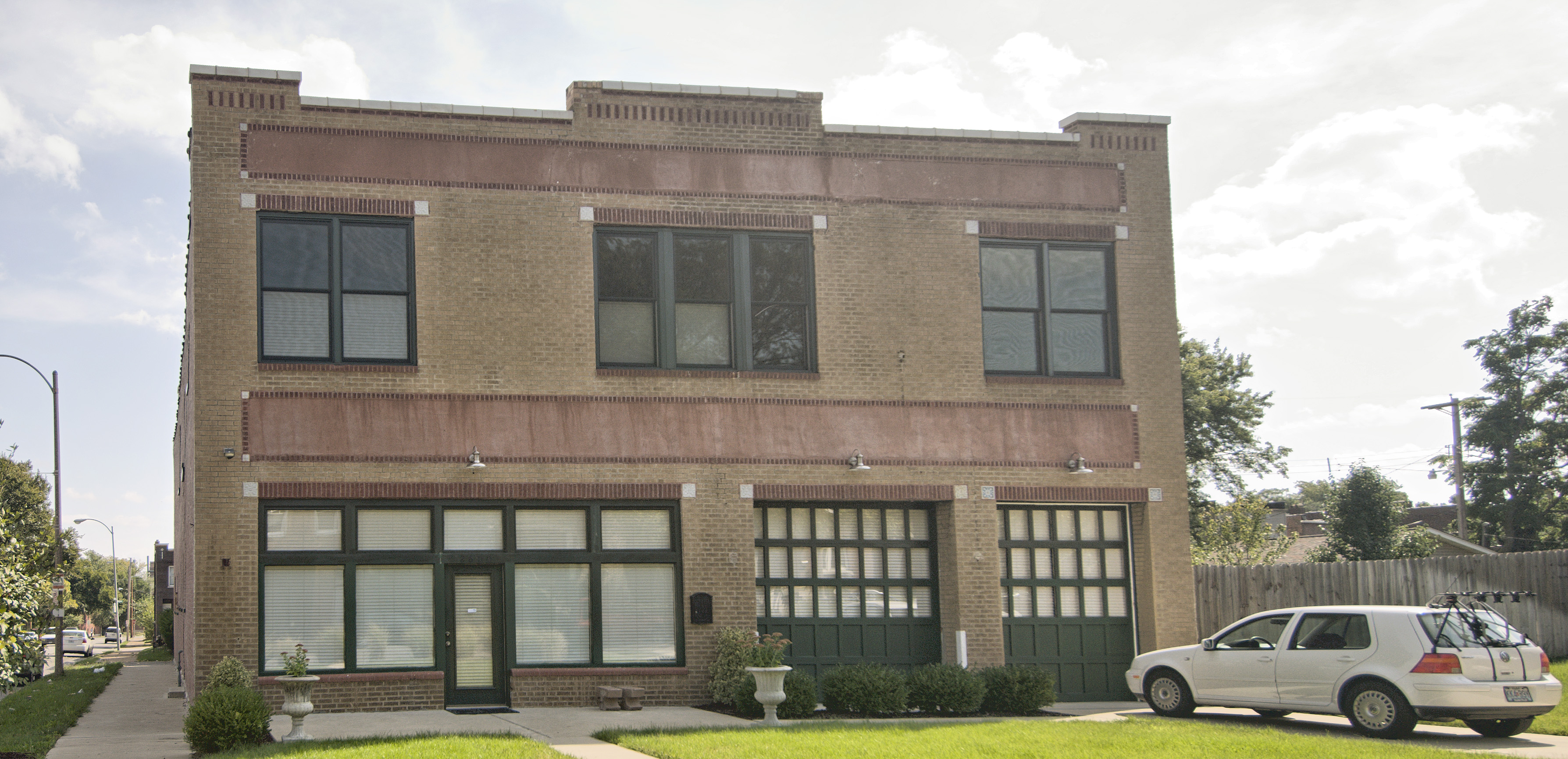
- Location: 2600-2614 Nebraska Ave., St. Louis, Missouri
- Coordinates: 38°36′30″N 90°13′45″W
- Area: less than one acre
- Built: 1925
- Built by: Dunn Brothers
- Architectural style: Two-part commercial block
- MPS: Auto-Related Resources of St. Louis, Missouri MPS
- NRHP reference No.: 07000463
- Added to NRHP: May 24, 2007

The Wachter Motor Car Company Building, at 2600-2614 Nebraska Ave. in St. Louis, Missouri, was built in 1925. It was listed on the National Register of Historic Places in 2007.

It is a two-story brick building built as a livery, warehouse, and funeral home.

It has also been known as the William Buol Livery and Funeral Home, and as the Sidney-Nebraska Garage Co.
