= Dun Borrafiach =

Archaeological site on the Isle of Skye, Scotland

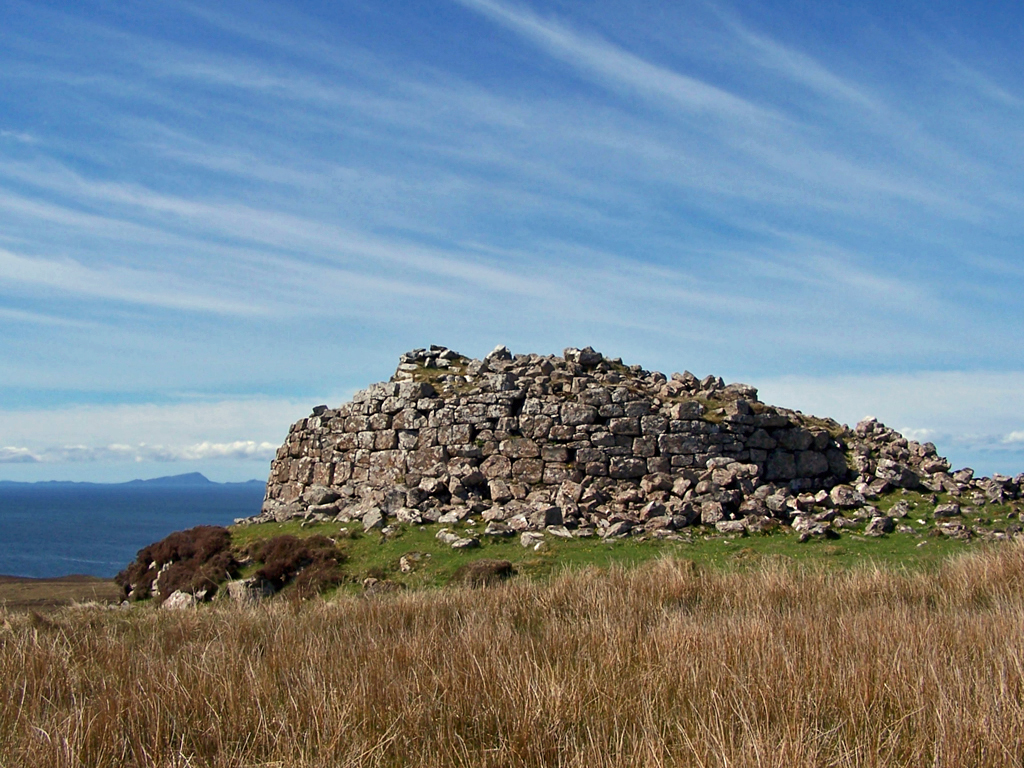
- Dun Borrafiach, south side

- Location within Isle of Skye
- 57°34′43″N 6°37′35″W
- Type: Broch
- Periods: Iron Age
- Location: Skye

Dun Borrafiach is an Iron Age broch located on the north coast of the island of Skye, in Scotland (grid reference NG23556371).

== Location ==
Dun Borrafiach is located on the Waternish peninsula of Skye, about 8 kilometres northwest of the village of Lusta. It occupies a rocky outcrop overlooking the Borrafiach Burn.

== Description ==
Dun Borrafiach has an external diameter of 16.5 metres, and the walls still stand to a height of 2.7 metres on the south side. The entrance is on the northwest side of the broch.

The northeast side of the entrance-way appears to have been narrowed in antiquity by the insertion of additional walling. Inside the broch, a long stretch of the outer face of the intramural gallery is still visible on the east side.
