= Ulmus × hollandica 'Smithii' =

Elm cultivar

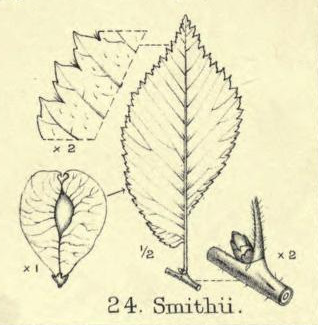
- Leaf of 'Smithii'
- Hybrid parentage: U. glabra × U. minor
- Cultivar: 'Smithii'
- Origin: Nottingham, England

The hybrid elm cultivar Ulmus × hollandica 'Smithii', commonly known as the Downton Elm, was one of a number of cultivars arising from the crossing of the Wych Elm U. glabra with the Field Elm U. minor. The tree was originally planted at Downton Castle near Ludlow, as one of a batch, not all of them pendulous in habit, raised at Smith's Nursery, Worcester, England, from seeds obtained from a tree in Nottingham in 1810.

'Smithii' or 'Downton Elm' is absent from Smith's 1887–88 catalogue, which contains 23 elms, unless it is one listed as 'Weeping English Elm'.

== Description ==
'Smithii' made a small to medium-sized tree, with ascending branches bearing long pendulous shoots, downy when young and developing corky ridges. The oval leaves are dark green, glabrous and glossy above, < 8.5 cm long by 4.0 cm wide, downy beneath, and long acuminate at the apex. Bean described them as "coarsely double-toothed", with 14–16 pairs of lateral veins, and a petiole about 0.75 inches (19 mm) long.

== Cultivation ==
'Smithii' was grown at the Royal Victoria Park, Bath in the mid-19th century, where it was distinguished from the similar-looking Scampston Elm by its larger leaf, at Kew Gardens, where there were two specimens in 1912, of 35 ft (11 m) and 25 ft (7.6 m), at the National Botanic Gardens, Glasnevin, Ireland, before the First World War, and in the parkland of Westonbirt House, Gloucestershire, 60 feet (18 m) high and 5 feet (1.5 m) in girth by the 1920s. It was present in The Hague in the 1930s.

In the US, two trees said to be Downton Elm supplied by the Mount Hope Nursery (also known as the Ellwanger and Barry Nursery) of Rochester, New York, and planted c.1855, stood in that city for almost a century, one by the house of Edward Bausch, the other in the grounds of the John Williams School. The former was described in 1953 as "a superb tree, upwards of 75 feet in height", "a typical specimen with the characteristic long drooping branches". They were successful cloned in 1949, but it is not known whether the scions survive.

In 1955 Melville queried one of the two 'Smithii' at Kew. The "slightly pendulous" no. 69, 60-ft by then, sourced from Darley Dale, Derbyshire, in 1888, was, he noted, "different from the tree Downton Elm, Ulmus vegeta pendula, no. 101". The 1955 nos. 69 and 101 may have been the two 'Smithii' referred to by Henry in 1912. The leaves of no. 69 appear similar to early 20th-century herbarium specimens at Kew and Glasnevin labelled 'Smithii' (see 'External Links'); Melville's specimen of no. 101 is held at Kew, as U. × hollandica nm. 'Smithii' Henry. There was, however, a James Smith nursery at Darley Dale that supplied trees to Kew, raising the possibility, as Melville suggested, that the Darley Dale 'Smithii' was not the Downton Elm of Smith's of Worcester.

Many 19th-century elms described in Elwes and Henry (1913) were excluded from standard 20th-century works such as those of Bean and Hillier, presumably as too rare, yet 'Smithii' continued to feature in later editions, suggesting it was an elm readers were likely to encounter in collections. The tree was propagated and marketed in the UK by the Hillier & Sons nursery, Winchester, Hampshire, from 1962 to 1977, during which time just 27 were sold. However, no captioned photographs nor verified survivors are known.

The Direction des Espaces Verts et de l'Environnement (DEVE) - Ville de Paris lists a 'Smithii' at the Square Louise-Michel, Paris (1990).

The 'Downton Elm' described in Boot's Familiar Trees (1888) appears to have been confused with a form of weeping wych.

=== Putative specimen ===
A pruned U. × hollandica with leaves that match 'Smithii' herbarium specimens from Glasnevin and Kew forms part of an avenue in Eaton Road, Hove.

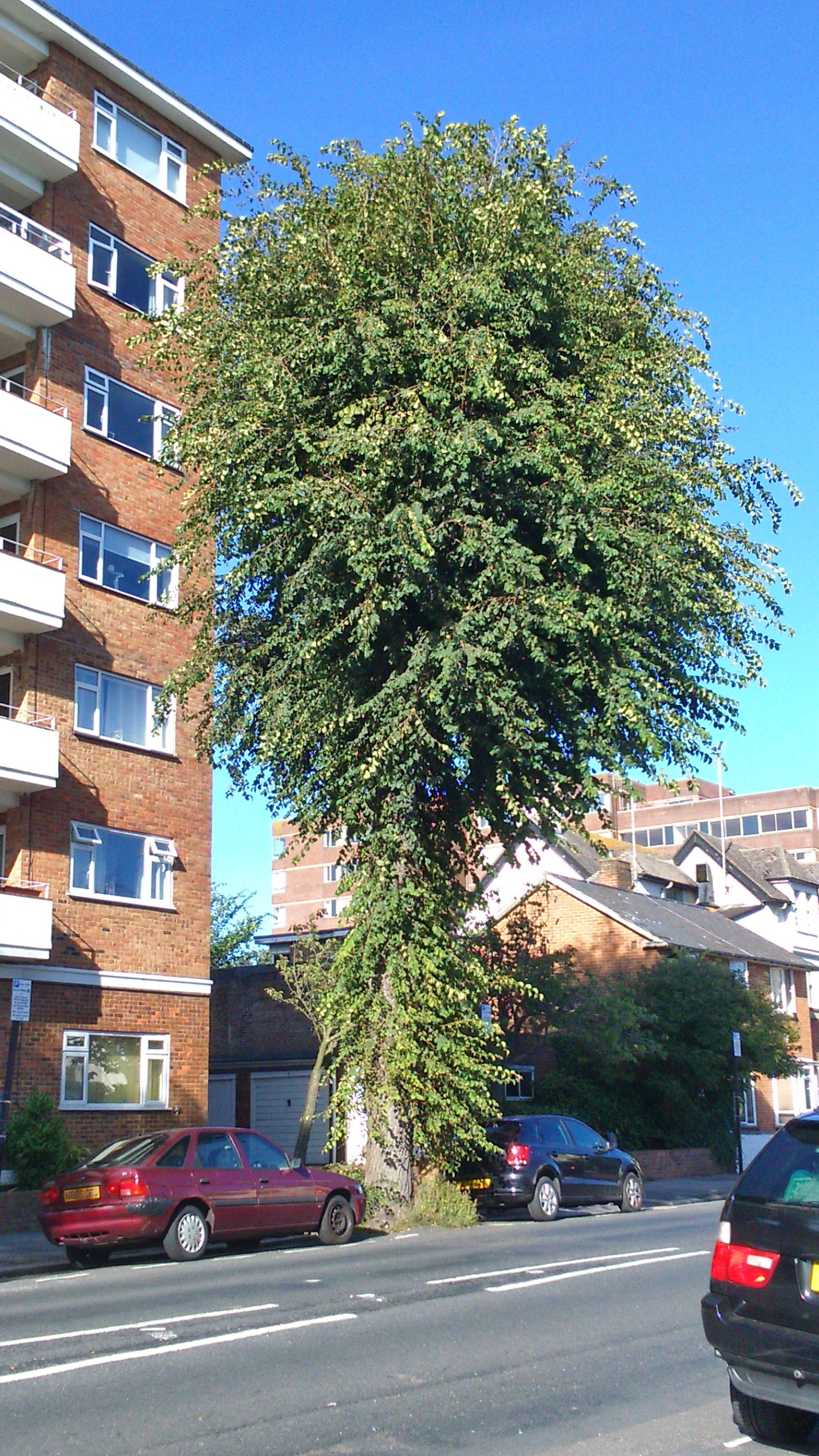
Eaton Rd elm, Hove

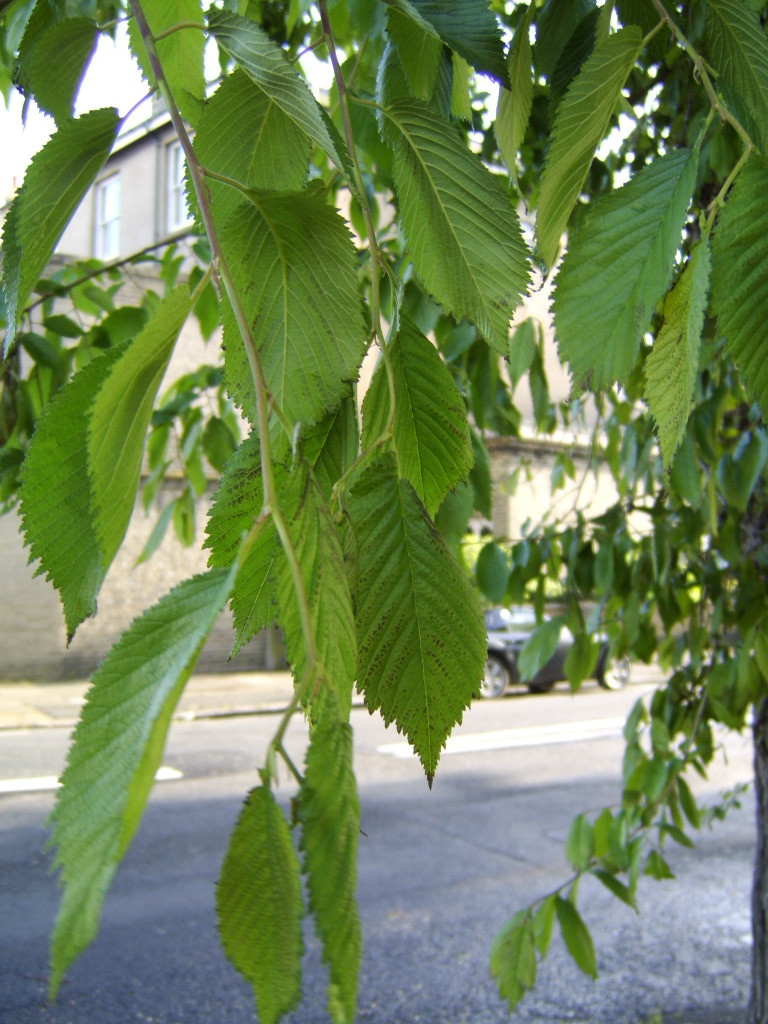
Pendulous shoots of same

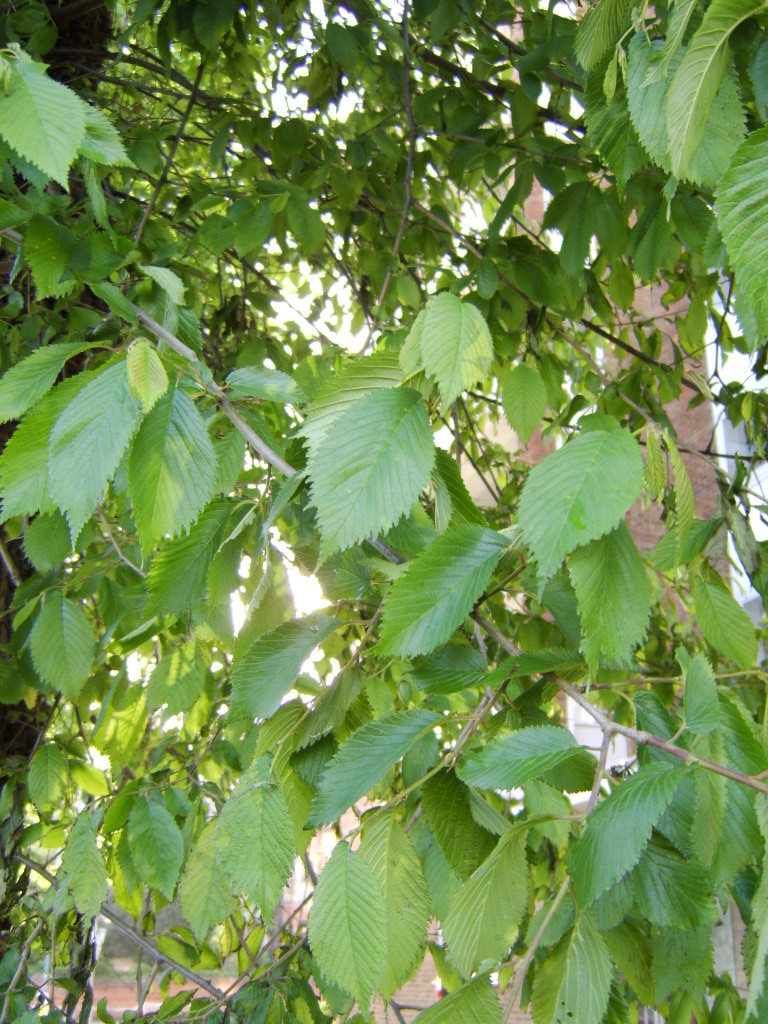
Foliage of same

== Synonymy ==
- Ulmus campestris pendula.
- Ulmus campestris 'Pendula'.
- Ulmus hollandica var. pendula.
- Ulmus glabra var. pendula.
- Ulmus montana var. Smithii Hort.: Kew
- Ulmus Smithii Henry.
