= Justice Dunn =

Justice Dunn may refer to:

- Charles Dunn (Wisconsin politician) (1799–1872), chief justice of the Wisconsin Territorial Supreme Court
- Charles J. Dunn (1872–1939), associate justice and chief justice of the Maine Supreme Judicial Court
- Francis G. Dunn (fl. 1930s–1980s), associate justice of the South Dakota Supreme Court
- Frank K. Dunn (1854–1940), associate justice of the Illinois Supreme Court
- Robert N. Dunn (1857–1925), associate justice of the Idaho Supreme Court
