= River Dun =

The River Dun may refer to:

- River Dun (River Kennet), in the English counties of Wiltshire and Berkshire
- River Dun (River Test), in the English counties of Wiltshire and Hampshire
- River Dun, an alternative name of the River Don, Yorkshire in England
- River Dun, Northern Ireland, in County Antrim, Northern Ireland
- Dun Stone Beck, Horton in Ribblesdale
