= Dun Bhruichlinn =

Coordinates: 55.7945°N 6.1988°W

Dun Bhruichlinn is an Iron Age fort south of Esknish, Islay, Scotland. The fort, or dun is circular with an internal diameter of 16 metres and the walls stand to a maximum height of 0.5 metres. It stands among trees on a low ridge.
