= Hortus Cantabrigiensis =

Hortus Cantabrigiensis is a catalogue of plants grown in the Walkerian Botanic Garden, a forerunner of the present Botanic Garden of Cambridge University, originally compiled by its first curator James Donn and published in 1796. A further 12 editions were published, the last in 1845, long after Donn's death.
