= James Donn =

English botanist (1758–1813)

- Born: 1758
- Died: 1813 (aged about 55)
- Known for: Hortus Cantabrigiensis
- Relatives: William Sterndale Bennett, grandson
- Scientific career
- Fields: Botany and horticulture
- Workplaces: Cambridge University Botanic Garden
- Author abbrev. (botany): Donn

James Donn (1758–1813) was an English botanist and gardener. He was trained by William Aiton, a protege of Sir Joseph Banks and was Curator of the Cambridge University Botanic Garden, Cambridge, from 1790 until his death. His most important work was Hortus Cantabrigiensis, first published in 1796 but with several later, much expanded, editions. It carried on past his death until 1845.

A copy was given to the Library of the Gray Herbarium of Harvard University in 1895.

He became a Fellow of the Linnean Society in 1812.

A memorial to James Donn, exists on St Edward the Martyr's church in Cambridge.

A grandson was the English composer William Sterndale Bennett.
