= List of Amaryllidoideae genera =

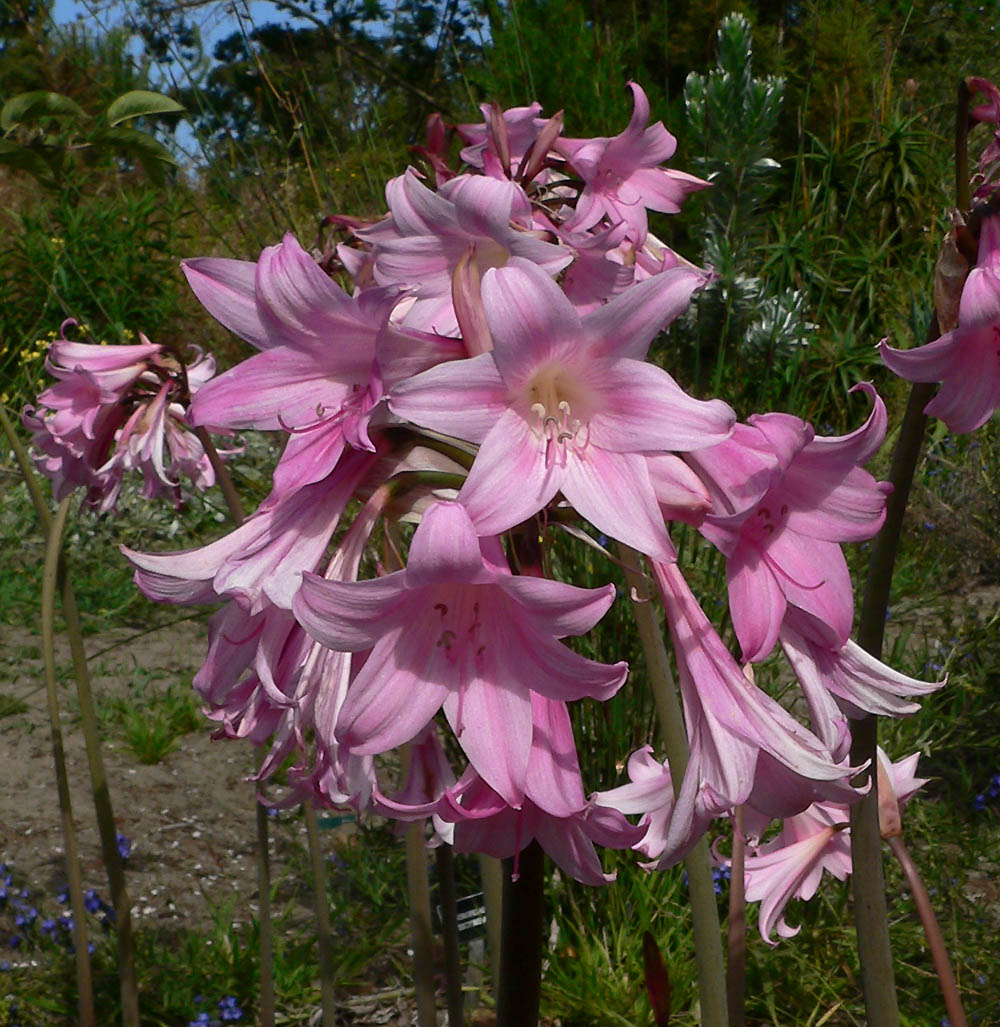
Amaryllis belladonna

Amaryllidoideae (Amaryllidaceae s.s., amaryllids) is a subfamily of monocot flowering plants in the family Amaryllidaceae, order Asparagales. The subfamily includes about seventy genera, with over eight hundred species, and a worldwide distribution.

The Amaryllidoideae subfamily includes about 70 genera.

== Genera ==
- Acis Salisb.
- Amaryllis L.
- Ammocharis Herb. (including Cybistetes Milne-Redh. & Schweick.)
- Apodolirion Baker
- Boophone Herb.
- Brunsvigia Heist.
- Caliphruria Herb. – synonym of Urceolina Reichenbach
- Calostemma R.Br.
- Chlidanthus Herb. (including Castellanoa Traub)
- Clinanthus Herb. (syn. Anax Ravenna)
- Clivia Lindl.
- Crinum L.
- Crossyne Salisb.
- Cryptostephanus Welw. ex Baker
- Cyrtanthus Aiton (syns Anoiganthus Baker, Vallota Salisb. ex Herb.)
- Eucharis Planch. & Linden, syn. of Urceolina Reichenbach
- Eucrosia Ker Gawl. (syn. Callipsyche Herb.)
- Eustephia Cav.
- Galanthus L.
- Gethyllis L. (syn. Klingia Schönl.)
- Griffinia Ker Gawl. (including Hyline Herb.)
- Haemanthus L.
- Hannonia Braun-Blanq. & Maire
- Hessea Herb. (syn. Kamiesbergia Snijman)
- Hieronymiella Pax (syn. Eustephiopsis R.E.Fr.)
- Hippeastrum Herb. (syn. Moldenkea Traub)
- Hymenocallis Salisb.
- Ismene Salisb. ex Herb (including Elisena Herb. and Pseudostenomesson Velarde)
- Lapiedra Lag.
- Leptochiton Sealy
- Leucojum L.
- Lycoris Herb.
- Mathieua Klotzsch
- Namaquanula D.Müll.-Doblies & U.Müll.-Doblies
- Narcissus L. (including Braxireon Raf. and Tapeinanthus Herb.)
- Nerine Herb.
- Pamianthe Stapf
- Pancratium L. (syns Mizonia A.Chev., Chapmanolirion Dinter)
- Paposoa Nic.García (syn. Eremolirion Nic.García)
- Paramongaia Velarde
- Phaedranassa Herb. (syns Neostricklandia Rauschert, Stricklandia Baker)
- Phycella Lyndl. (including Famatina Ravenna, Placea Miers)
- Plagiolirion Baker
- Proiphys Herb. (syn. Eurycles Salisb. ex Schult. & Schult.)
- Pyrolirion Herb.
- Rauhia Traub
- Scadoxus Raf. (syn. Choananthus Rendle)
- Shoubiaonia W.H.Qin
- Sprekelia Heist.
- Stenomesson Herb. (syn. Anax (plant)|Anax Ravenna, Callithauma Herb., Crocopsis Pax, Pucara Ravenna)
- Sternbergia Waldst. & Kit.
- Strumaria Jacq. ex Willd. (syns Bokkeveldia D.Müll.-Doblies & U.Müll.-Doblies, Carpolyza Salisb., Gemmaria Salisb., Carpolyza Salisb., Tedingea D.Müll.-Doblies & U.Müll.-Doblies)
- Traubia Moldenke
- Ungernia Bunge
- Urceolina Rchb. (syns Collania Schult. & Schult.f., Pseudourceolina Vargas)
- Vagaria Herb.
- Worsleya (W.Watson ex Traub) Traub
- Zephyranthes Herb. (syns. Cooperia Herb., Eithea Ravenna, Habranthus Herb., Rhodophiala C.Presl, Rhodolirium Phil., Rhodolirion Dalla Torre & Harms, Zephyranthella (Pax) Pax, Haylockia Herb.)

== Bibliography ==
- Stevens, P.F. (2016) [2001], Angiosperm Phylogeny Website, Missouri Botanical Gardens
