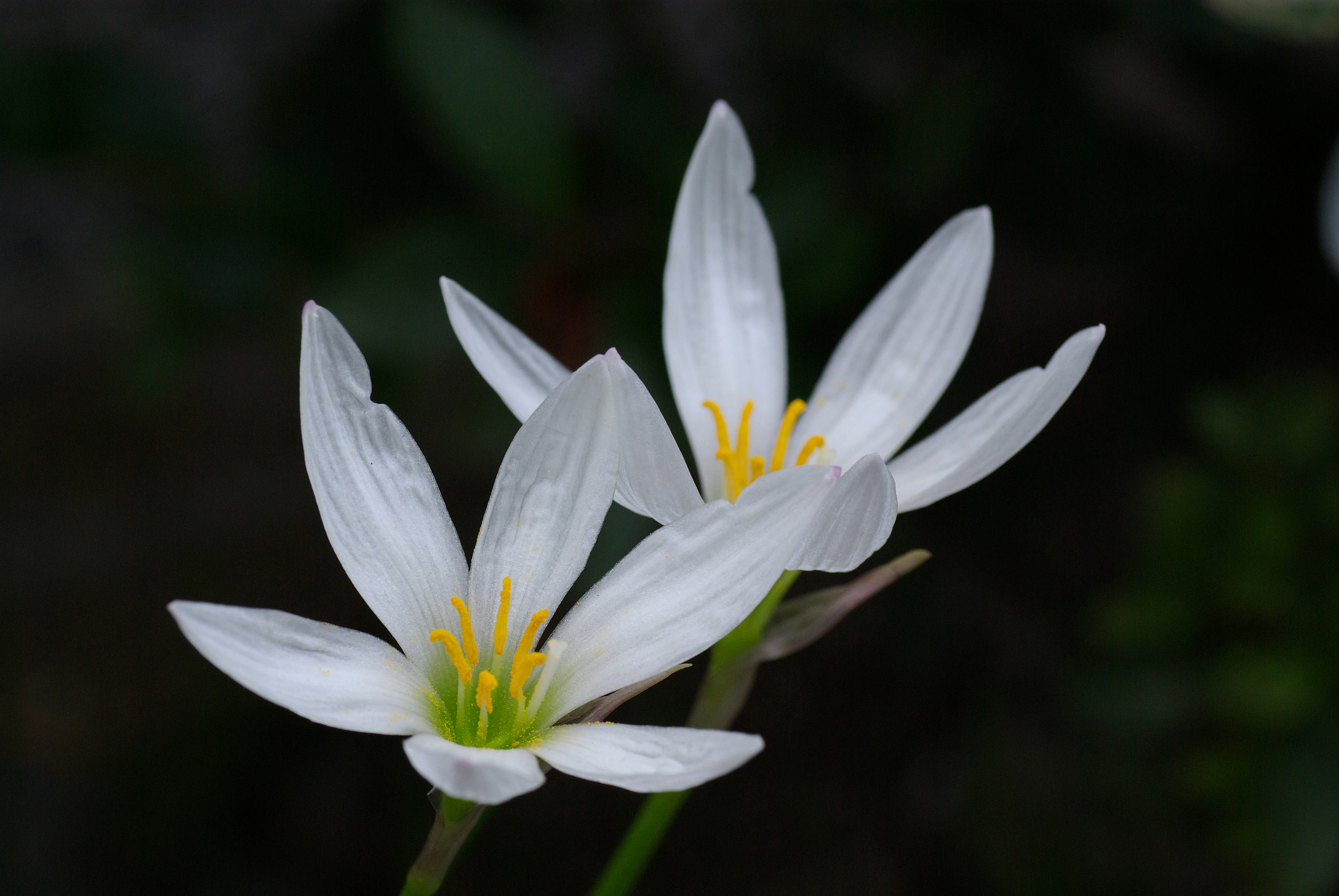
- Flowers of Zephyranthes candida

Scientific classification
- Kingdom: Plantae
- Clade: Tracheophytes
- Clade: Angiosperms
- Clade: Monocots
- Order: Asparagales
- Family: Amaryllidaceae
- Subfamily: Amaryllidoideae
- Tribe: Hippeastreae
- Subtribe: Zephyranthinae

= Zephyranthinae =

Subtribe of flowering plants

Zephyranthinae was a subtribe of plants classified under the tribe Hippeastreae. It belonged to the subfamily Amaryllidoideae of the Amaryllis family (Amaryllidaceae). They are generally small plants with solitary flowers. Spathes are fused forming a tube surrounding the pedicel of the flower. Most of its members were commonly known as rain lilies. It included four genera:

- Zephyranthes Herb.
- Cooperia Herb. – now subsumed in Zephyranthes
- Habranthus Herb. – now subsumed in Zephyranthes
- Sprekelia Heist. - Aztec lilies.

Members of the former genus Haylockia are also now classified under Zephyranthes. Pyrolirion (fire lilies), once often included under Zephyranthes, is now considered to be a distinct genus and placed in the tribe Eustephieae.

Following the application of molecular phylogenetics the subtribe was found to be polyphyletic and subsequently dispersed amongst two other Hippeastreae subtribes.
