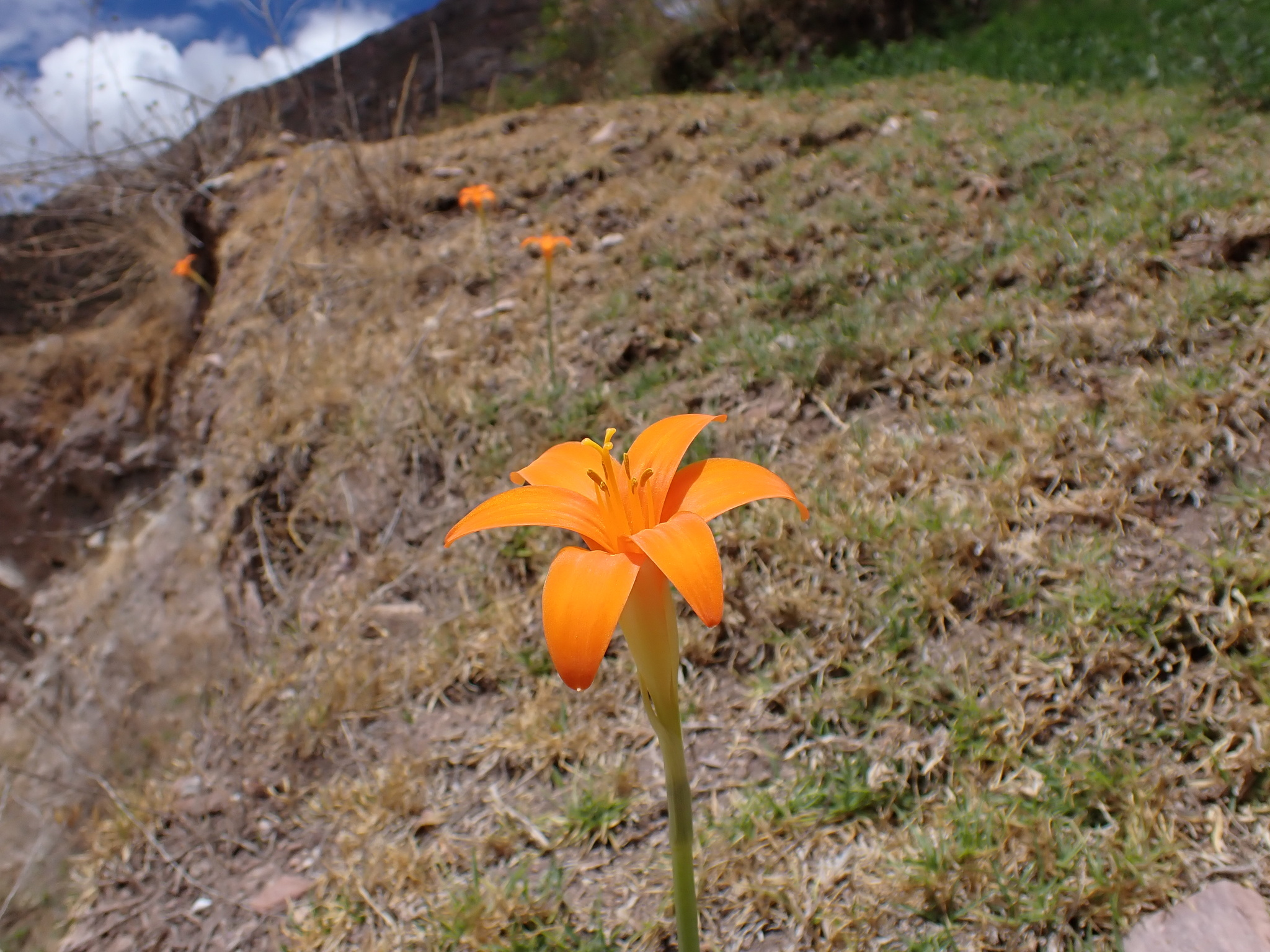

Scientific classification
- Kingdom: Plantae
- Clade: Tracheophytes
- Clade: Angiosperms
- Clade: Monocots
- Order: Asparagales
- Family: Amaryllidaceae
- Subfamily: Amaryllidoideae
- Genus: Pyrolirion
- Species: P. tubiflorum

Binomial name
- Pyrolirion tubiflorum (L’Hér.) M.Roem.

= Pyrolirion tubiflorum =

Species of plant

Pyrolirion tubiflorum is a species of flowering plant in the family Amaryllidaceae. It is a perennial bulbous geophyte distributed in Peru, North Chile, and Ecuador.

== Description ==
=== Vegetative characteristics ===
Pyrolirion tubiflorum is a perennial, bulbous herb with tunicate, ovoid to globose, 2.5–4.5 cm long bulbs.

=== Generative characteristics ===
The bright orange, actinomorphic, solitary flower is borne on a 12–30 cm tall scape.
