= Fire lily =

Fire lily may refer to:

== Plants ==
- Members of the African and Asian genus Gloriosa
- Lilium bulbiferum, in family Liliaceae
- Members of the South American genus Pyrolirion (family Amaryllidaceae), named for the color of their flowers
- Several South African species in genus Cyrtanthus (family Amaryllidaceae) that bloom after a fire

== Fictional characters ==
- Elednor (English: Fire Lily), a character in the Pellinor fantasy series by Australian author Alison Croggon

== Other ==
- Feuerlilie (English: Fire Lily) was the code name of a German anti-aircraft missile
