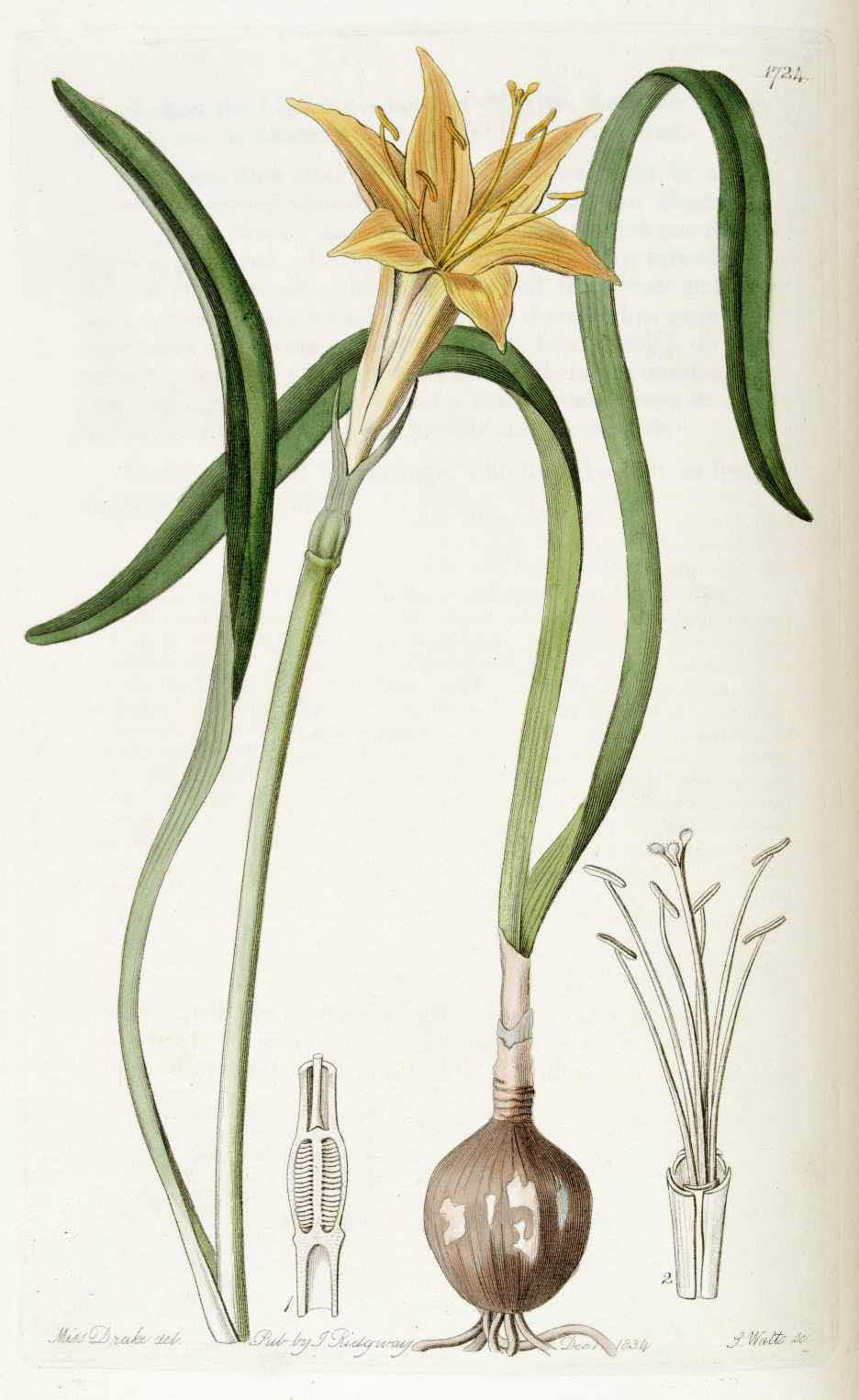
- golden flame lily (Pyrolirion arvense)

Scientific classification
- Kingdom: Plantae
- Clade: Tracheophytes
- Clade: Angiosperms
- Clade: Monocots
- Order: Asparagales
- Family: Amaryllidaceae
- Subfamily: Amaryllidoideae
- Tribe: Eustephieae
- Genus: Pyrolirion; Herb.

Species
- See here

Synonyms
- Leucothauma Ravenna

= Pyrolirion =

Fire lilies Flame lilies

Genus of flowering plants

Pyrolirion, commonly known as fire lilies or flame lilies, is a small genus of herbaceous, bulbous South American plants in the Amaryllis family, native to Chile, Peru, Bolivia, and Ecuador.

== Description ==
=== Vegetative characteristics ===
Pyrolirion are bulbous, herbs with tunicate bulbs and slim, annual, linear to linear-lanceolate leaves. The bulbs produce offsets.

=== Generative characteristics ===
The white, orange or yellow flowers are borne erect on solitary hollow scapes. The perigone is funnel-shaped, with a cylindrical tube that flares out abruptly into star-like radially arranged (actinomorphic) petals. Small scale-like "paraperigone" may be present at the base. The flower has 6 tepals. The androecium consists of 6 stamens. The stamens arise from or below the throat. The gynoecium consists of 3 carpels. The style has three branches at the tip with spoon-shaped (spatulate) stigmas. The capsule fruit bears discoid, compressed, black seeds with a white raphe.

=== Cytology ===
Various chromosome counts have been reported: 2n = 26, 34, 51, 54.

== Taxonomy ==
The genus Pyrolirion was first established by the British botanist William Herbert in 1837. The name Pyrolirion is from Greek πῦρ (pyr, "fire") and λείριον (leirion, "lily"). It is named after the flame-like colors of the flowers of Pyrolirion arvense (the golden flame lily).

Pyrolirion is classified under the tribe Eustephieae of the subfamily Amaryllidoideae, family Amaryllidaceae. It was previously sometimes considered by some authors as a subgenus of Zephyranthes (rain lilies), but DNA sequencing has shown that it is a distinct genus more closely related to the genera Chlidanthus, Eustephia, and Hieronymiella in the tribe Eustephieae than to members of the tribe Hippeastreae.

=== Species ===
The species-level classification of Pyrolirion is unclear and in need of further study. The following are accepted at present (April 2015)

1. Pyrolirion albicans Herb. – Peru (Arequipa)
2. Pyrolirion arvense (F.Dietr.) – Peru (Cusco, Lima)
3. Pyrolirion boliviense (Baker) Sealy – Bolivia (Cochabamba, La Paz)
4. Pyrolirion cutleri (Cárdenas) Ravenna – Bolivia (Cochabamba)
5. Pyrolirion flavum Herb. – Peru (Cusco, Lima)
6. Pyrolirion huantae Ravenna – Peru
7. Pyrolirion tarahuasicum Ravenna – Peru
8. Pyrolirion tubiflorum (L'Hér.) M.Roem. – Peru, Chile, Ecuador

== Cultivation ==
It is not widely cultivated. It requires a period of dormancy in winter.
