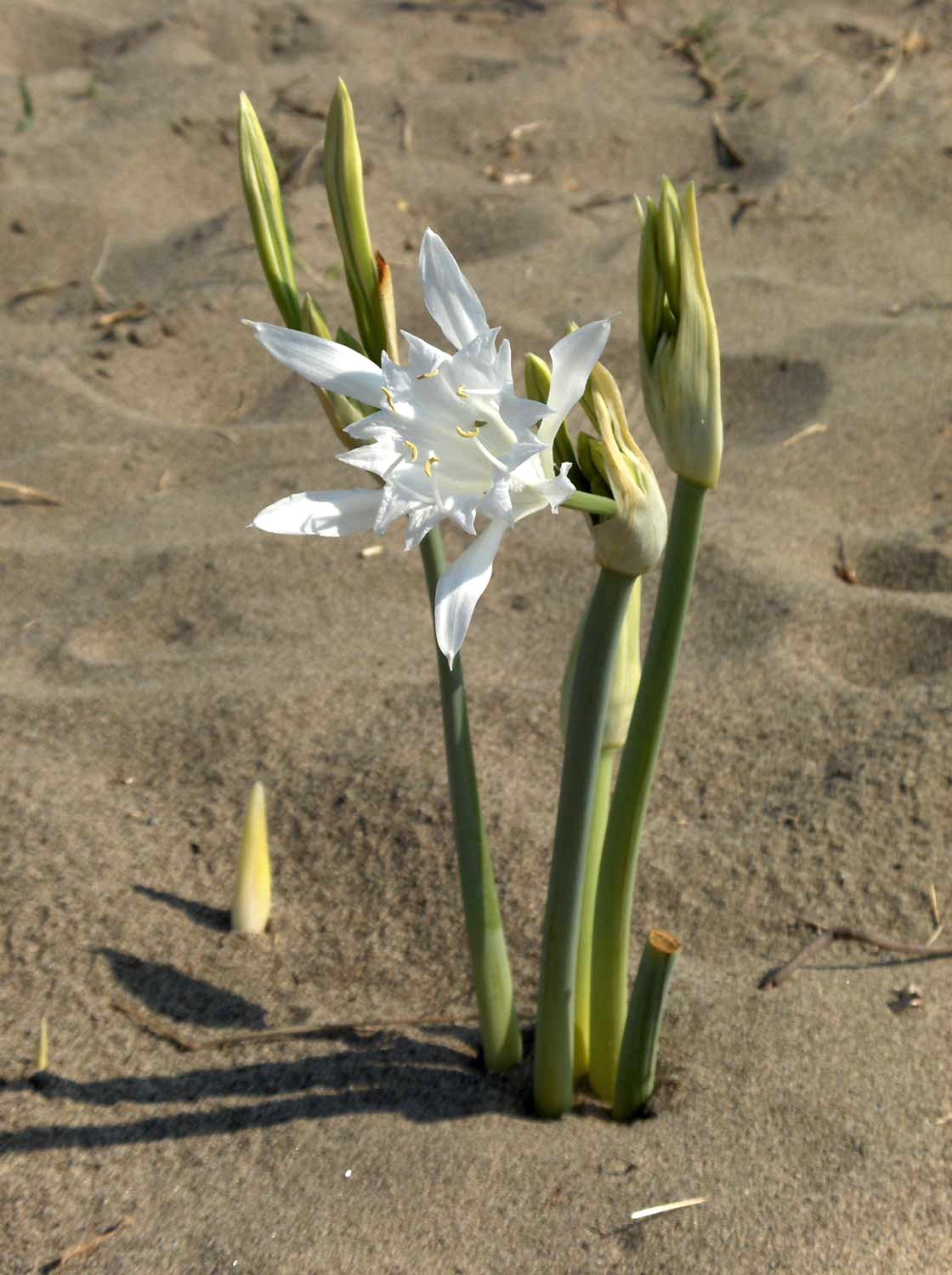
- Pancratium maritimum

Scientific classification
- Kingdom: Plantae
- Clade: Tracheophytes
- Clade: Angiosperms
- Clade: Monocots
- Order: Asparagales
- Family: Amaryllidaceae
- Subfamily: Amaryllidoideae
- Tribe: Pancratieae; Dumort.

Type genus
- Pancratium Dill. ex L.

Genera
- Pancratium; Vagaria

= Pancratieae =

Tribe of flowering plants

Pancratieae are a small European tribe of subfamily Amaryllidoideae (family Amaryllidaceae), consisting of two genera including the type genus, Pancratium.

== Taxonomy ==
=== Phylogeny ===
The placement of Pancratieae within subfamily Amaryllidoideae is shown in the following cladogram:

Cladogram: Tribes of subfamily Amaryllidoideae

- Subfamily Amaryllidoideae
  - Africa
    Tribe Amaryllideae
  - - - Africa
        Tribe Cyrtantheae
      - - Africa
          Tribe Haemantheae
        - Australasia
          Tribe Calostemmateae
    - - Eurasian clade
        - Asia
          Tribe Lycorideae
        - Mediterranean
          - Tribe Galantheae
          - - Tribe Pancratieae
            - Tribe Narcisseae
      - American clade
        - Hippeastroid clade
          - Tribe Griffineae
          - Tribe Hippeastreae
        - Andean clade
          - - Tribe Eustephieae
          - - Tribe Eucharideae/Stenomesseae
            - - - Tribe Clinantheae
                - Tribe Hymenocallideae

=== Subdivision ===
Two genera:

- Pancratium
- Vagaria

== Bibliography ==
- Meerow A. 1995. Towards a phylogeny of the Amaryllidaceae. In P. J. Rudall, P. J. Cribb, D. F. Cutler, and C. J. Humphries [eds.], Monocotyledons: systematics and evolution, 169–179. Royal Botanic Gardens, Kew.
- Müller-Doblies, U.; Müller-Doblies, D. (1996). "Tribes and subtribes and some species combinations in Amaryllidaceae J St Hil R Dahlgren & al. 1985". Feddes Repertorium. 107 (5–6): S.c.1–S.c.9.
- Meerow A. and D. A. Snijman. 1998 Amaryllidaceae. In K. Kubitzki [ed.], Families and genera of vascular plants, vol. 3, 83–110. Springer-Verlag, Berlin.
- Meerow, Alan W. Michael F. Fay, Charles L Guy, Qin-BaoLi, Faridah Q Zaman and Mark W. Chase. 1999 Systematics of Amaryllidaceae based on cladistic analysis of plastid sequence data. American Journal of Botany. 86: 1325.
- Meerow, AW; Francisco-Ortega, J; Schnell, RJ (2006). "Phylogenetic relationships and biogeography within the Eurasian clade of Amaryllidaceae based on plastid ndhF and nrDNA ITS sequences: lineage sorting in a reticulate area?". Systematic Botany. 31 (1): 42–60. doi:10.1600/036364406775971787. JSTOR 25064128. S2CID 85953035. Archived from the original on December 29, 2018. Full text
- Meerow, Alan W.; Snijman, Deirdre A. (2006). "The never-ending story: multigene approaches to the phylogeny of Amaryllidaceae". Aliso. 22: 355–366. doi:10.5642/aliso.20062201.29.
- Vigneron, Pascal. "Amaryllidaceae". Amaryllidaceae.org (in French). Archived from the original on 4 January 2015.
- Stevens, P.F. (2001–2012), Angiosperm Phylogeny Website: Amaryllidoideae
- "Amaryllidaceae: A taxonomic tool for the Amaryllidaceae of the world". eMonocot. Archived from the original on 2016-03-04.
