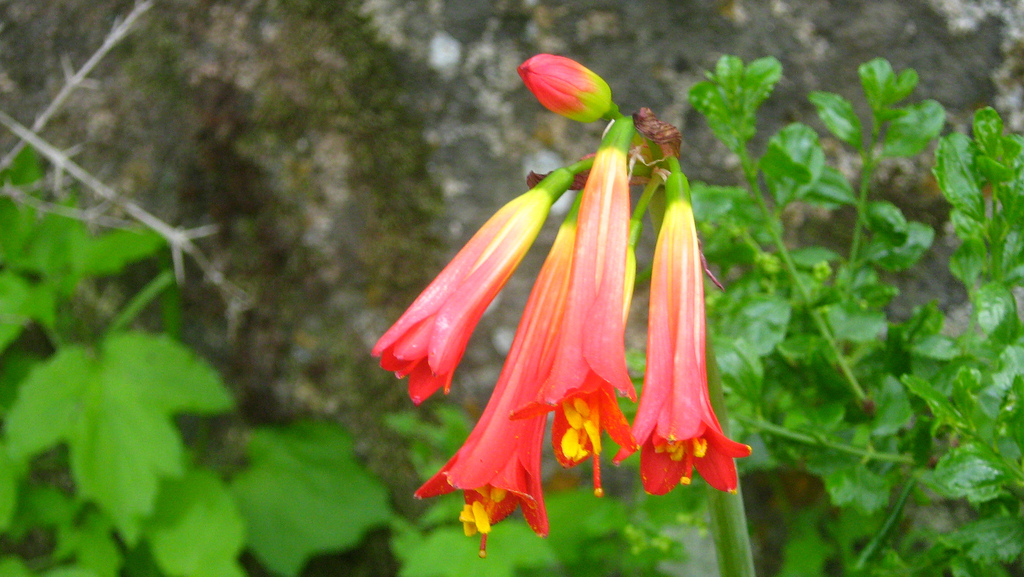
- Eustephia coccinea

Scientific classification
- Kingdom: Plantae
- Clade: Tracheophytes
- Clade: Angiosperms
- Clade: Monocots
- Order: Asparagales
- Family: Amaryllidaceae
- Subfamily: Amaryllidoideae
- Tribe: Eustephieae
- Genus: Eustephia; Cav.

Type species
- Eustephia coccinea Cav.

= Eustephia =

Genus of flowering plants

Eustephia is a genus of South American plants in the Amaryllis family. All 6 known species are native to Peru, with the range of one species extending also into Bolivia.

== Description ==
=== Vegetative characteristics ===
Eustephia are bulbous plants with linear leaves.

=== Generative characteristics ===
The pendent to declinate, tubular flowers display green colouration towards the tip.

== Cytology ==
The chromosome count is 2n = 46.

== Taxonomy ==
It was published by Antonio José Cavanilles in 1795 with Eustephia coccinea Cav. as the type species.

=== Species ===
The genus has the following species:

- Eustephia armifera J.F.Macbr. - Peru (Cusco)
- Eustephia coccinea Cav. - Peru (Cusco, Huánuco, Junin), Bolivia (La Paz)
- Eustephia darwinii Vargas - Peru (Cusco)
- Eustephia hugoei Vargas - Peru (Junin)
- Eustephia kawidei Vargas - Peru (Cusco)
- Eustephia longibracteata Vargas - Peru (Puno)

formerly included

Several names have been coined using the name Eustephia but referring to species now considered better suited to other genera (Hieronymiella or Phycella). Here are links to help you find appropriate information

- Eustephia argentina - Hieronymiella argentina
- Eustephia brevituba - Phycella brevituba
- Eustephia corusca - Phycella cyrtanthoides
- Eustephia cyrtanthoides - Phycella cyrtanthoides
- Eustephia herbertiana - Phycella herbertiana
- Eustephia ignea - Phycella cyrtanthoides
- Eustephia latifolia - Hieronymiella argentina
- Eustephia marginata - Hieronymiella argentina
- Eustephia pamiana - Hieronymiella pamiana
- Eustephia speciosa - Hieronymiella speciosa
