= Mathieua =

Scientific classification
- Kingdom: Plantae
- Clade: Tracheophytes
- Clade: Angiosperms
- Clade: Monocots
- Order: Asparagales
- Family: Amaryllidaceae
- Genus: Mathieua; Klotzsch
- Species: M. galanthoides

Binomial name
- Mathieua galanthoides Klotzsch
- It was endemic to Peru

Synonyms
- Eucharis galanthoides (Klotzsch) Planch. & Linden; Urceolina galanthoides (Klotzsch) Traub

Species of plant

Mathieua is a genus of South American plants in the family Amaryllidaceae. It contains only one known species, Mathieua galanthoides, native to Peru but reportedly extinct.

== Description ==
=== Vegetative characteristics ===
Mathieua galanthoides is a bulbous herb with ovate, tunicate bulbs. The ovate leaves have a long petiole.

=== Generative characteristics ===
The scapose inflorescence with a glabrous, erect, green scape bears 3–4 sessile flowers. The flowers are white with green towards the apex. The androecium consists of 6 stamens. The gynoecium consists of 3 carpels. The short stigma is trilobed.

== Taxonomy ==
The genus and species were first described by Johann Friedrich Klotzsch in 1853. The holotype specimen is a single flower without ovary.

=== Etymology ===
The generic name Mathieua honours Louis Mathieu. The flowers resemble those of Galanthus.

== Ecology ==
=== Habitat ===
It occurred in a region of sparse, xeric woodlands.
