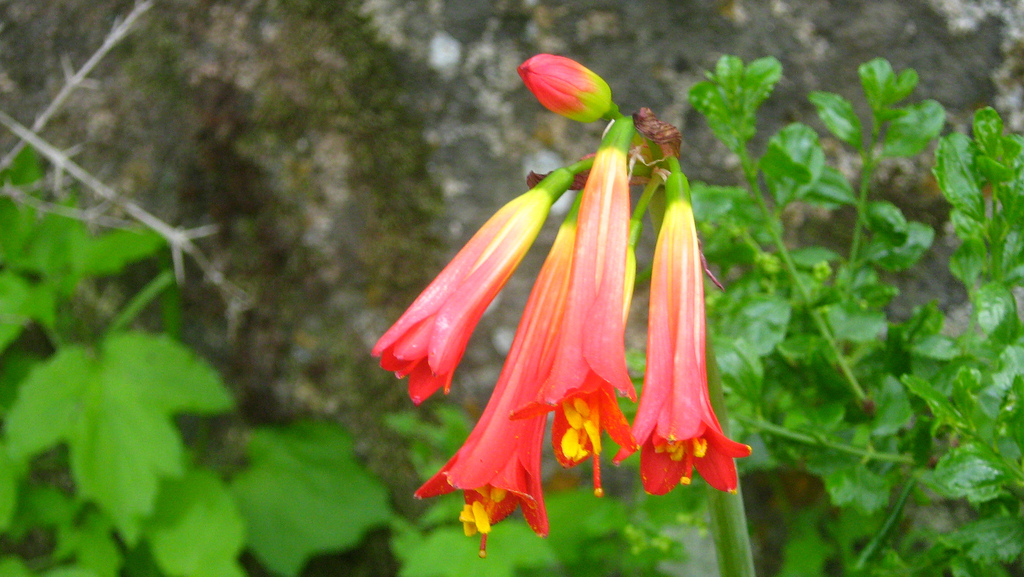
- Eustephia coccinea

Scientific classification
- Kingdom: Plantae
- Clade: Tracheophytes
- Clade: Angiosperms
- Clade: Monocots
- Order: Asparagales
- Family: Amaryllidaceae
- Subfamily: Amaryllidoideae
- Tribe: Eustephieae; Hutch.

Type genus
- Eustephia Hutch.

Genera
- See text

= Eustephieae =

Tribe of flowering plants

Eustephieae is a flowering plant tribe in the family Amaryllidaceae, subfamily Amaryllidoideae. It forms part of the Andean clade, one of two clades in The Americas.

== Description ==
=== Vegetative characteristics ===
Eustephieae are bulbous plants with often long-necked bulbs and linear leaves.

=== Generative characteristics ===
The pedicellate, tubular flowers are borne on a solid scape.

== Taxonomy ==
It was published by John Hutchinson in 1934 with Eustephia Cav. as the type genus.

=== Phylogeny ===
This tribe was resurrected from the Stenomesseae in 1995, by Meerow. The placement of Eustephieae within subfamily Amaryllidoideae is shown in the following cladogram, where this tribe is shown as a sister group to the remainder of the tetraploid Andean clade.

Cladogram: Tribes of subfamily Amaryllidoideae

- Subfamily Amaryllidoideae
  - Africa
    Tribe Amaryllideae
  - - - Africa
        Tribe Cyrtantheae
      - - Africa
          Tribe Haemantheae
        - Australasia
          Tribe Calostemmateae
    - - Eurasian clade
        - Asia
          Tribe Lycorideae
        - Mediterranean
          - Tribe Galantheae
          - - Tribe Pancratieae
            - Tribe Narcisseae
      - American clade
        - Hippeastroid clade
          - Tribe Griffineae
          - Tribe Hippeastreae
        - Andean clade
          - - Tribe Eustephieae
          - - Tribe Eucharideae/Stenomesseae
            - - - Tribe Clinantheae
                - Tribe Hymenocallideae

=== Subdivision ===
The tribe has four genera:

- Eustephia Cav.
- Chlidanthus Herb.
- Hieronymiella Pax
- Pyrolirion Herb.

== Distribution ==
The Eustephieae form the southern limit of the Andean clade. They are found in Peru in the southern Andes, and the northern Andes of Argentina, Bolivia and Chile. This is distinct from the central Andean distribution of the remainder of the parent clade.

== Bibliography ==
- Meerow, Alan. Towards a phylogeny of the Amaryllidaceae. pp. 169–179., in Rudall et al. (1995)
- Müller-Doblies, U.; Müller-Doblies, D. (1996). "Tribes and subtribes and some species combinations in Amaryllidaceae J St Hil R Dahlgren & al. 1985". Feddes Repertorium. 107 (5–6): S.c.1–S.c.9.
- Meerow, AW; Snijman, DA (1998). Flowering Plants · Monocotyledons. pp. 83–110. doi:10.1007/978-3-662-03533-7_11. ISBN 978-3-642-08377-8. S2CID 240114483., in Kubitzki (1998). (additional excerpts)
- Meerow, Alan W.; Snijman, Deirdre A. (2006). "The never-ending story: multigene approaches to the phylogeny of Amaryllidaceae". Aliso. 22: 355–366. doi:10.5642/aliso.20062201.29.
- Vigneron, Pascal (2008). "Amaryllidaceae". Amaryllidaceae.org (in French). Archived from the original on 4 January 2015.
- Stevens, P.F. (2001–2012), Angiosperm Phylogeny Website: Amaryllidoideae
- Rudall, P.J.; Cribb, P.J.; Cutler, D.F.; Humphries, C.J., eds. (1995). Monocotyledons: systematics and evolution (Proceedings of the International Symposium on Monocotyledons: Systematics and Evolution, Kew 1993). Kew: Royal Botanic Gardens. ISBN 978-0-947643-85-0.
- Kubitzki, K., ed. (1998). The families and genera of vascular plants. Vol.3. Berlin, Germany: Springer-Verlag. ISBN 978-3-540-64060-8.
- Meerow, A.W.; Fay, M.F.; Guy, C.L.; Li, Q.-B.; Zaman, F.Q.; Chase, M.W. (1999). "Systematics of Amaryllidaceae based on cladistic analysis of plastid rbcL and trnL-F sequence data". Am. J. Bot. 86 (9): 1325–1345. doi:10.2307/2656780. JSTOR 2656780. PMID 10487820.
- Meerow, A.W.; Guy, C.L.; Li, Q.-B.; Yang, S.-L. (2000). "Phylogeny of the American Amaryllidaceae Based on nrDNA ITS Sequences" (PDF). Systematic Botany. 25 (4): 708–726. doi:10.2307/2666729. JSTOR 2666729. S2CID 20392462. Archived from the original (PDF) on 23 September 2015.
- "Amaryllidaceae: A taxonomic tool for the Amaryllidaceae of the world". eMonocot. Archived from the original on 2016-03-04.
