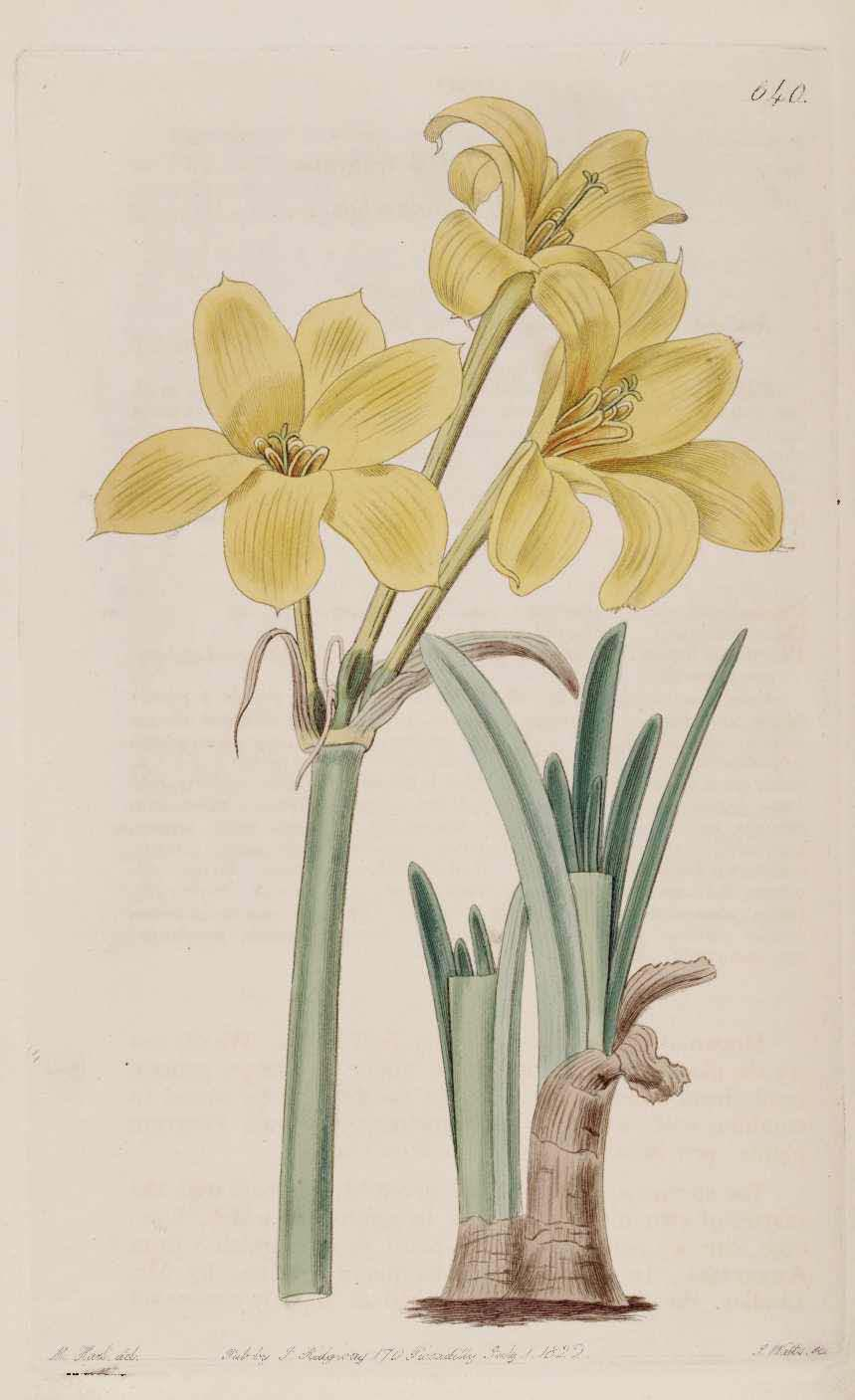
- Chlidanthus fragrans

Scientific classification
- Kingdom: Plantae
- Clade: Embryophytes
- Clade: Tracheophytes
- Clade: Angiosperms
- Clade: Monocots
- Order: Asparagales
- Family: Amaryllidaceae
- Subfamily: Amaryllidoideae
- Tribe: Eustephieae
- Genus: Chlidanthus; Herb.

Species
- See text.

Synonyms
- Castellanoa Traub; Clitanthes Herb.; Clitanthum Benth. & Hook.f.; Coleophyllum Klotzsch; Sanmartina Traub

= Chlidanthus =

Genus of flowering plants

Chlidanthus is a genus of flowering plants in the family Amaryllidaceae native to Argentina, Bolivia, and Peru.

== Description ==
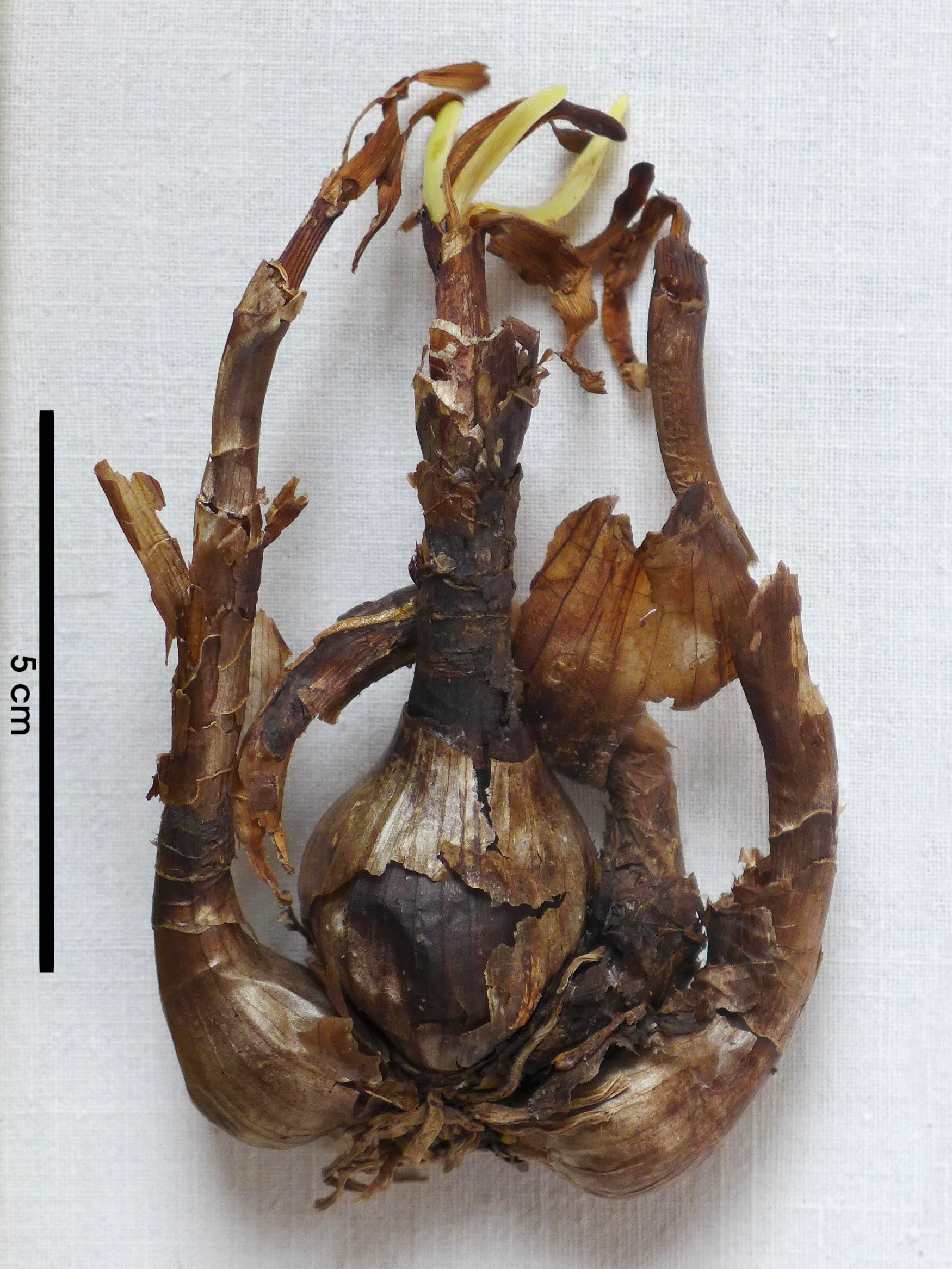
Bulb of Chlidanthus fragrans with scale bar (5 cm)

=== Vegetative characteristics ===
Chlidanthus has tunicate bulbs. The leaves are linear.

=== Generative characteristics ===
The inflorescence is a few-flowered umbel. The pedicellate or sessile flowers have a slightly curved, elongate, tubular, marcescent perianth composed of six tepals, which does not have a corona. The androecium consists of six basally fused stamens. The curved filaments are very short. The erect style has a trifid stigma. The trilocular capsule fruit bears numerous flat and thin seeds. The flowers of Chlidanthus fragrans are pleasantly fragrant.

== Taxonomy ==
=== Publication ===
The genus Chlidanthus Herb. was published by William Herbert in 1821.

=== Species ===
The genus Chlidanthus has five species:

- Chlidanthus ariruma R.Lara & Céspedes Escalera
- Chlidanthus boliviensis Traub & I.S.Nelson
- Chlidanthus fragrans Herb.
- Chlidanthus soratensis (Baker) Ravenna
- Chlidanthus yaviensis (Ravenna) Ravenna

=== Placement within Amaryllidoideae ===
It is placed in the tribe Eustephieae.

== Etymology ==
The generic name Chlidanthus means delicate flower.
