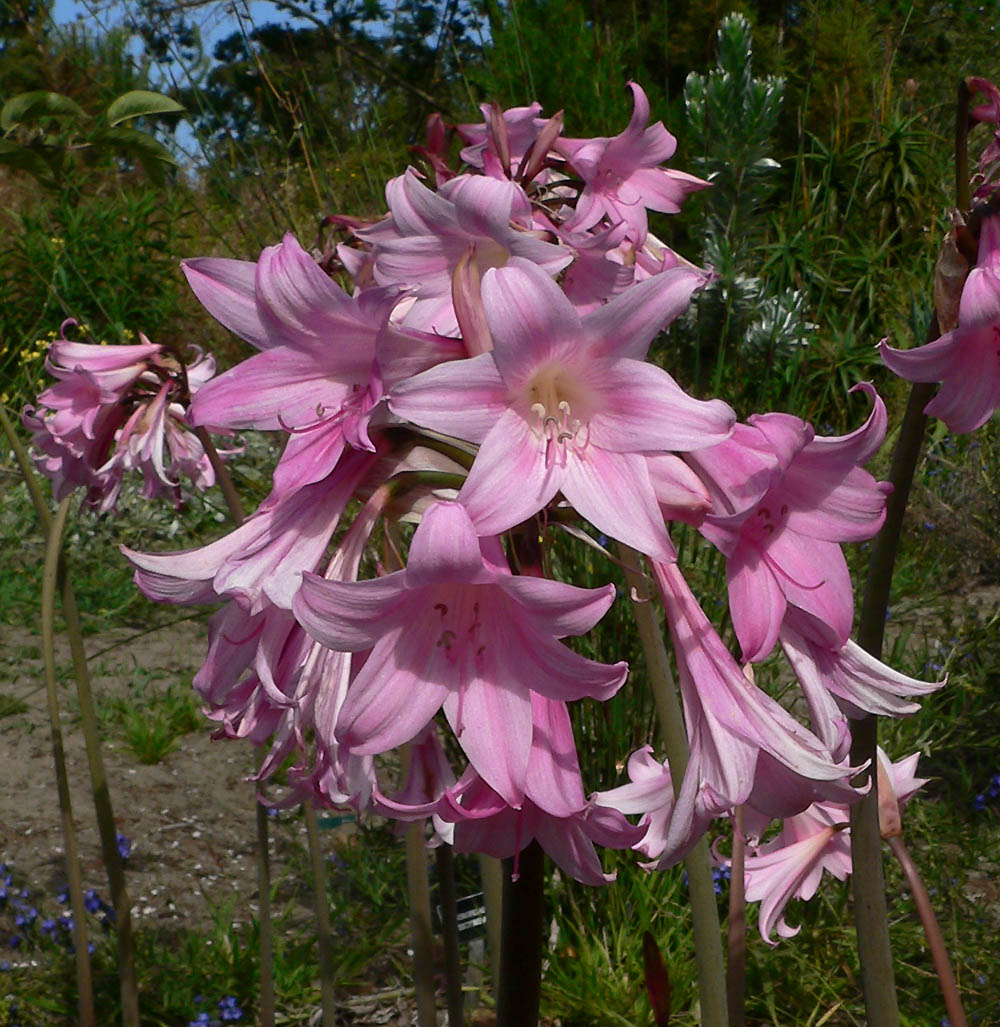
- Amaryllis belladonna

Scientific classification
- Kingdom: Plantae
- Clade: Embryophytes
- Clade: Tracheophytes
- Clade: Spermatophytes
- Clade: Angiosperms
- Clade: Monocots
- Order: Asparagales
- Family: Amaryllidaceae; J.St.-Hil. nom. cons.

Type genus
- Amaryllis L.

Subfamilies
- Agapanthoideae; Allioideae; Amaryllidoideae

Synonyms
- Alliaceae Borkh.

= Amaryllidaceae =

Family of flowering plants

The Amaryllidaceae are a family of herbaceous, mainly perennial and bulbous (rarely rhizomatous) flowering plants in the monocot order Asparagales. The family takes its name from the genus Amaryllis and is commonly known as the amaryllis family. The leaves are usually linear, and the flowers are usually bisexual and symmetrical, arranged in umbels on the stem. The petals and sepals are undifferentiated as tepals, which may be fused at the base into a floral tube. Some also display a corona. Allyl sulfide compounds produce the characteristic odour of the onion subfamily (Allioideae).

The family, which was originally created in 1805, now contains about 1600 species, divided into 71 genera, 17 tribes and three subfamilies, the Agapanthoideae (Agapanthus), Allioideae (onions, garlic and chives) and Amaryllidoideae (amaryllis, daffodils, snowdrops). Over time, it has seen much reorganisation and at various times was combined with the related Liliaceae. Since 2009, a very broad view has prevailed based on phylogenetics, and including a number of other former families.

The family is found in tropical to subtropical and temperate areas of the world and includes many ornamental garden plants and vegetables.

== Description ==
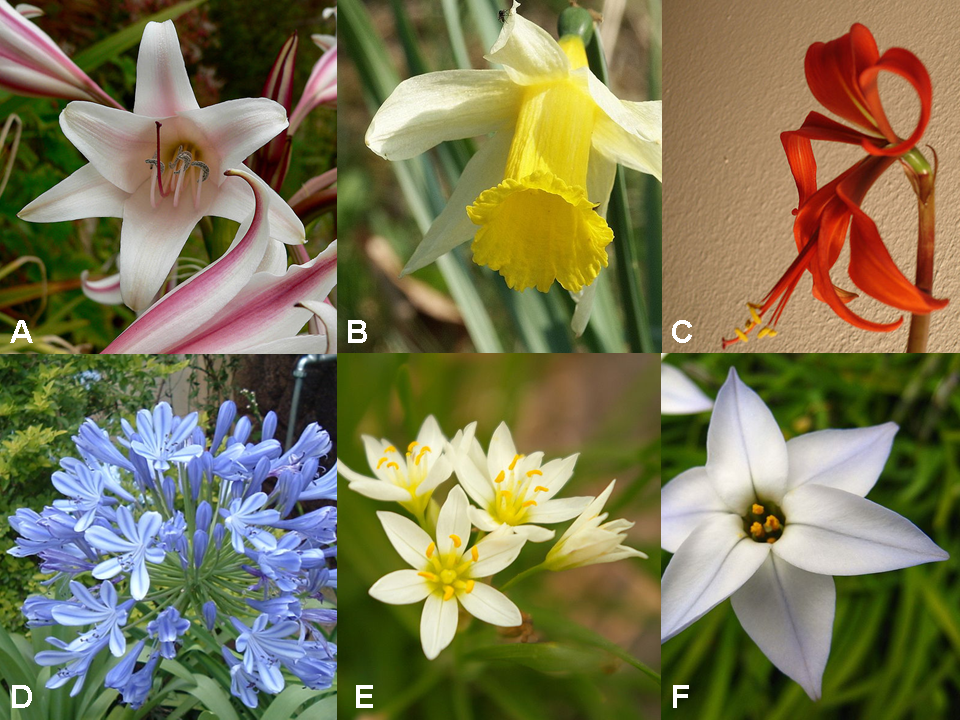
Floral diversity in Amaryllidaceae. A: Crinum, B: Narcissus, C: Sprekelia, D: Agapanthus, E: Allium, F: Tristagma

Vegetative

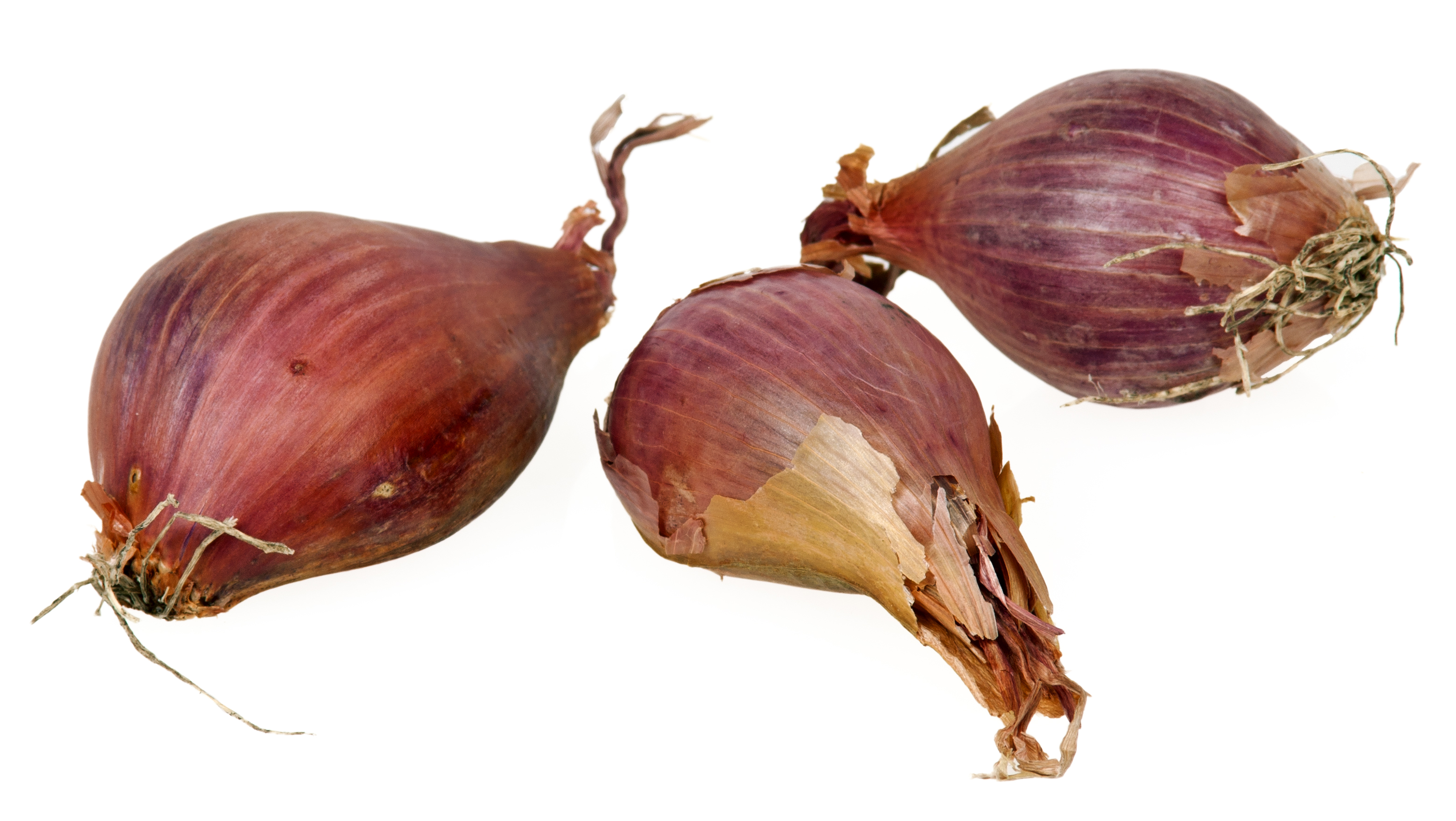
Allium cepa bulbs with roots

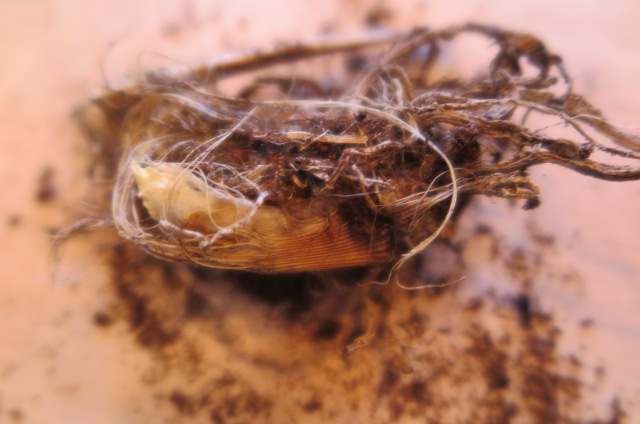
Rhizome of Agapanthus

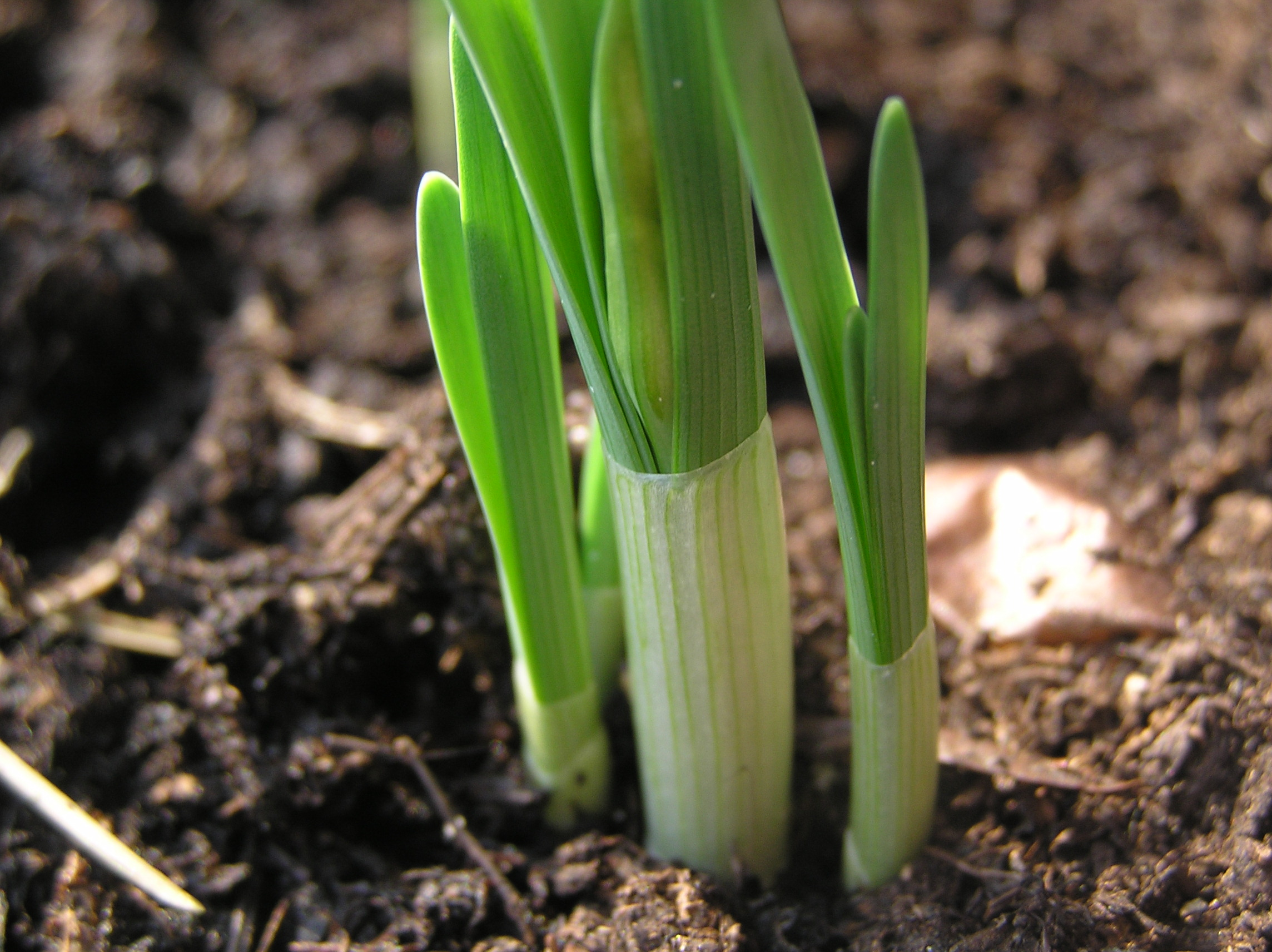
Narcissus shoots emerging, with sheathed leaves

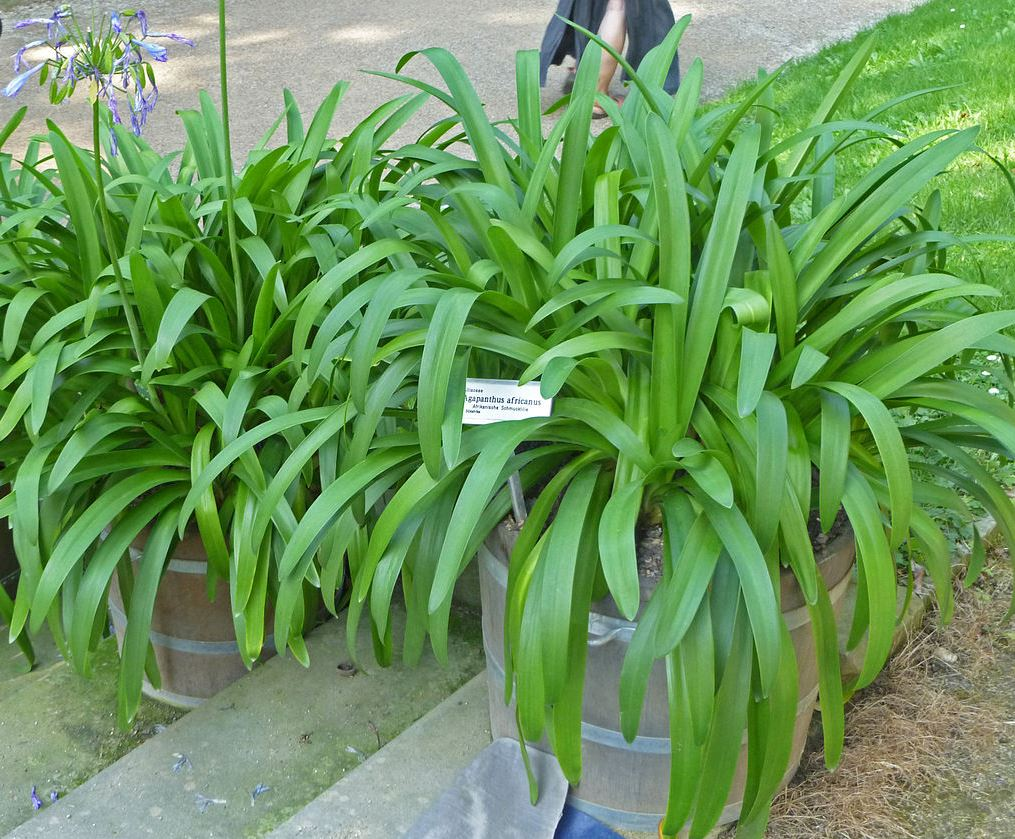
Flower and leaves of Agapanthus africanus

Floral morphology

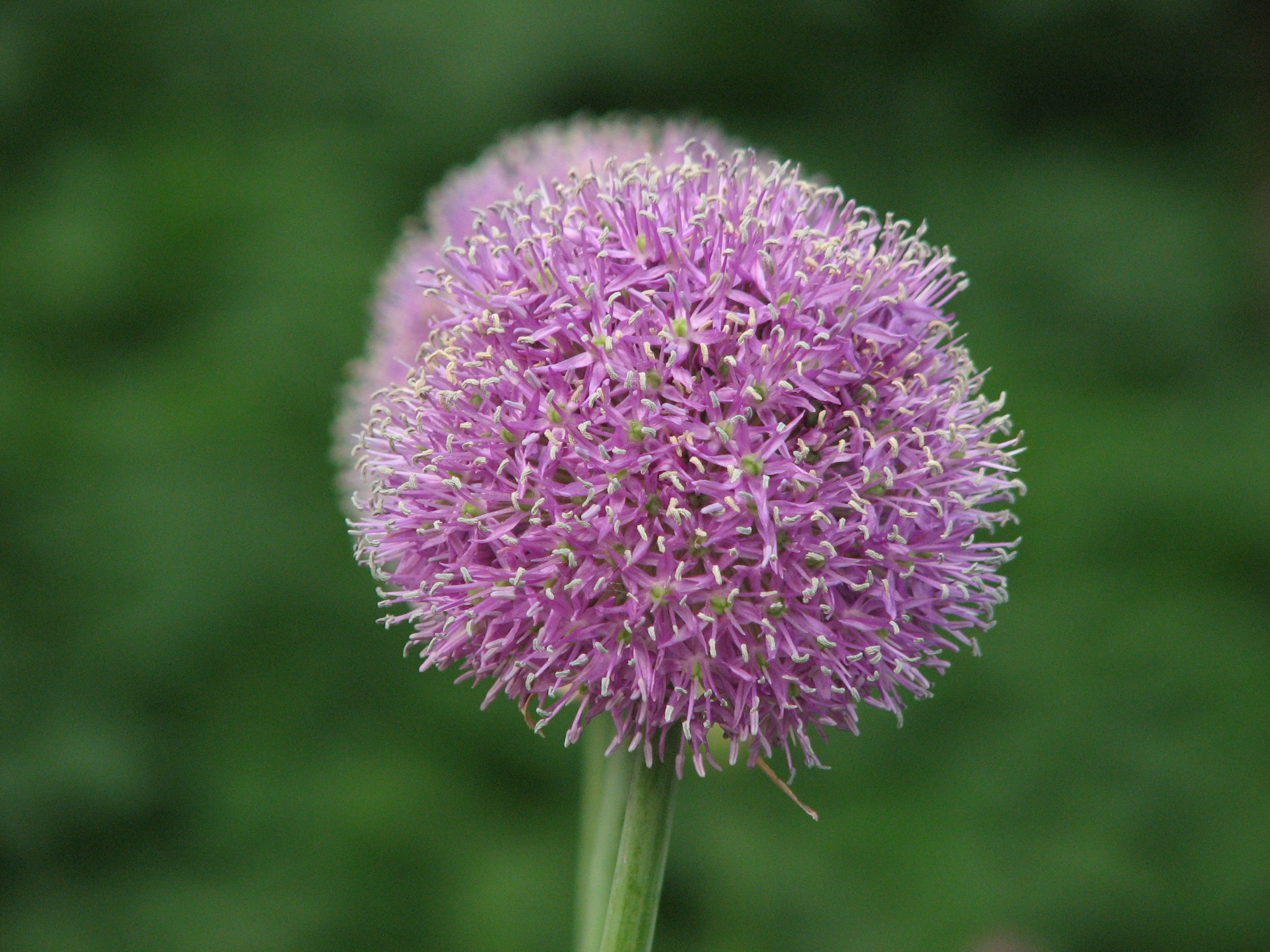
Umbel of Allium aflatunense

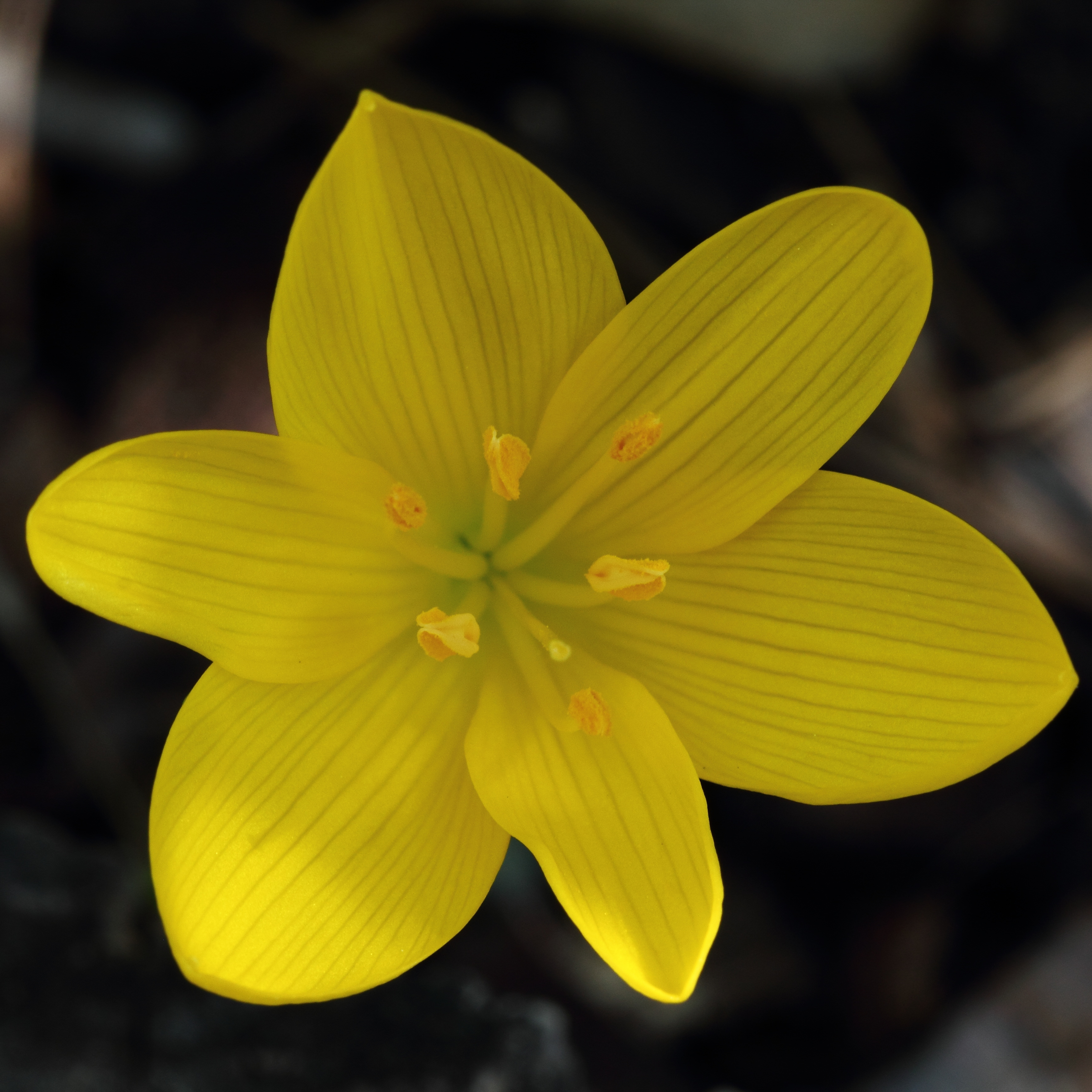
Organization of an Amaryllidaceae flower (Sternbergia lutea) with the six non-differentiated tepals and the six stamens

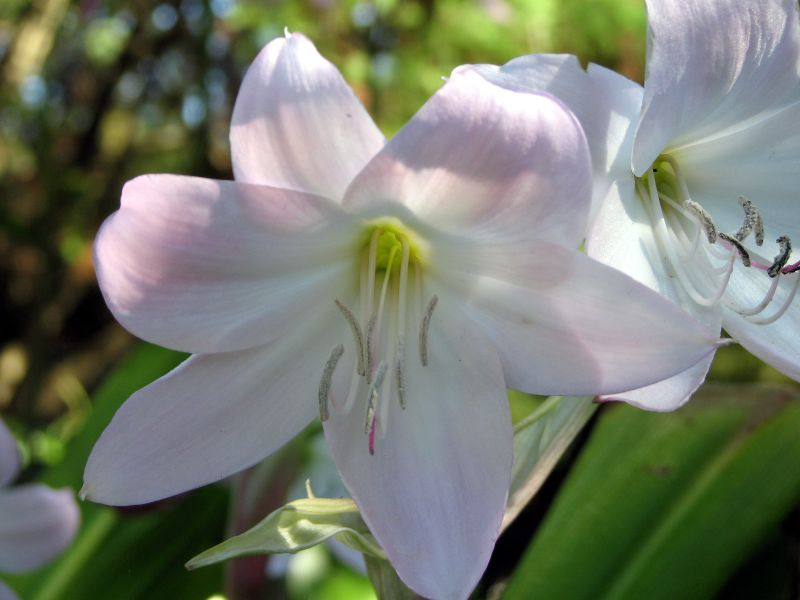
Crinum moorei, showing radial symmetry

The Amaryllidaceae are mainly terrestrial (rarely aquatic) flowering plants that are herbaceous or succulent geophytes (occasionally epiphytes) that are perennial, with the exception of four species. Most genera grow from bulbs, but a few such as Agapanthus, Clivia and Scadoxus develop from rhizomes (underground stems).

The leaves are simple, rather fleshy and two-ranked with parallel veins. Leaf shape may be linear, strap like, oblong, elliptic, lanceolate (lance shaped) or filiform (threadlike). The leaves which are either grouped at the base or arranged alternatively on the stem may be sessile or petiolate and possess a meristem.

The flowers, which are hermaphroditic (bisexual), are actinomorphic (radially symmetrical), rarely zygomorphic, pedicellate or sessile, and are typically arranged in umbels at the apex of leafless flowering stems, or scapes and associated with a filiform (thread-like) bract. The perianth (perigonium) consists of six undifferentiated tepals arranged in two whorls of three. The tepals are similar in shape and size, and may be free from each other or fused at the base (connate) to form a floral tube (hypanthium). In some genera, such as Narcissus, this may be surmounted by cup or trumpet-shaped projection, the corona (paraperigonium or false corolla). This may be reduced to a mere disc in some species.

The position of the ovary varies by subfamily. The subfamilies Agapanthoideae and Allioideae have superior ovaries, while the Amaryllidoideae have inferior ovaries. The six stamens are arranged in two whorls of three, occasionally more as in Gethyllis (Amaryllidoideae, 9–18).

The fruit is dry and capsule-shaped, or fleshy and berry-like.

The Allioideae produce allyl sulfide compounds which give them their characteristic smell.

== Taxonomy ==
Type species of Amaryllidaceae subfamilies

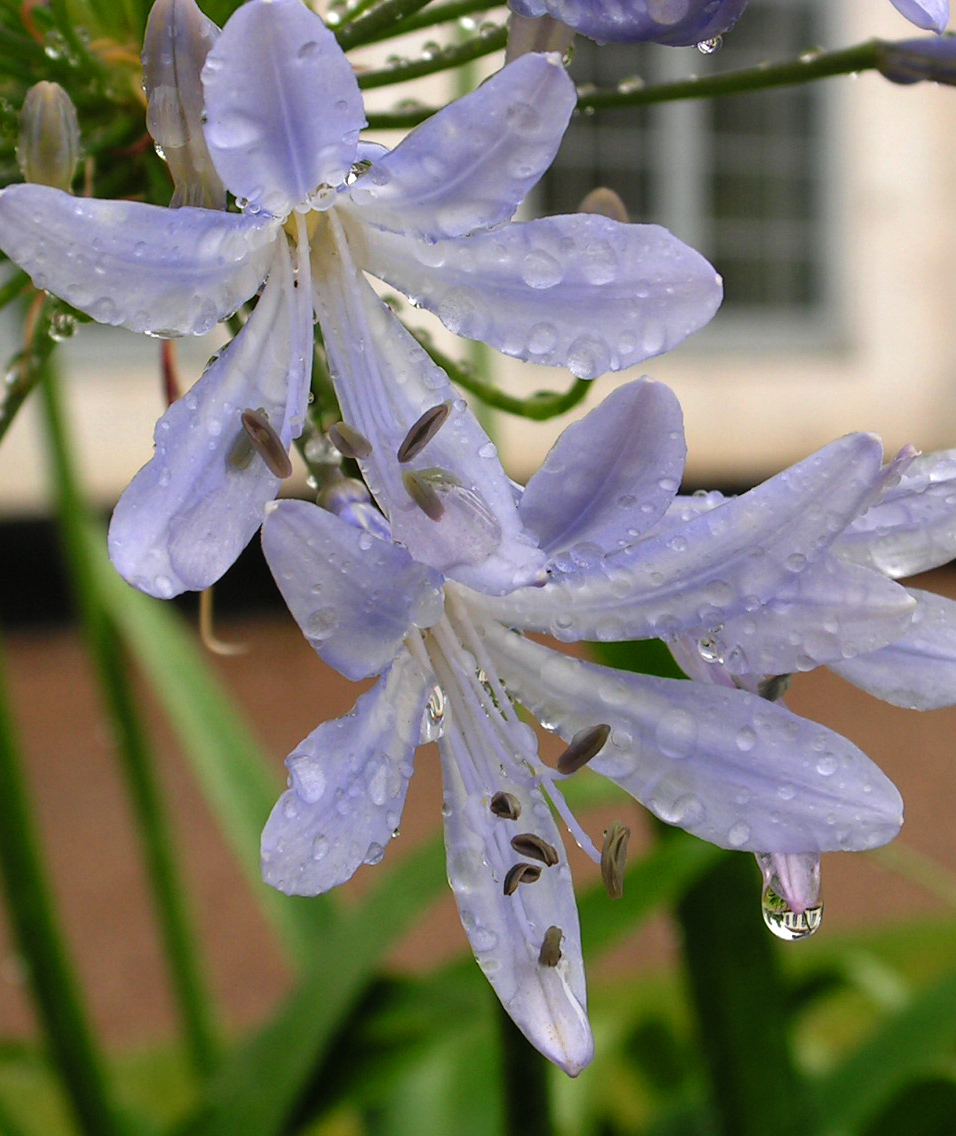
Agapanthus africanus (Agapanthoideae)

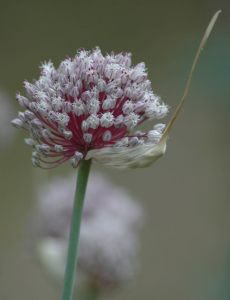
Allium sativum (Allioideae)

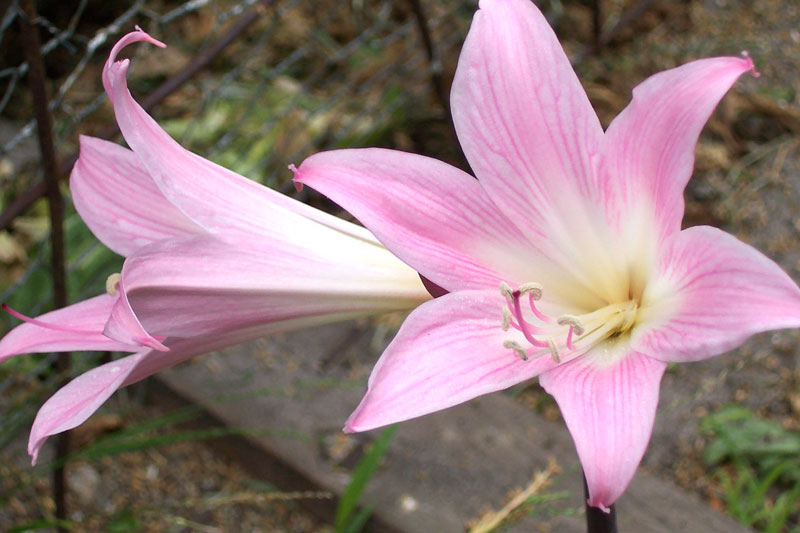
Amaryllis belladonna (Amaryllidoideae)

=== History ===
==== Pre-Darwinian ====
Linnaeus described the type genus Amaryllis, from which the family derives its name, in his Species Plantarum in 1753, with nine species, in the Hexandria monogynia (i.e. six stamens and one pistil) containing 51 genera in total in his sexual classification scheme. The name Amaryllis had been applied to a number of plants over the course of history.

Hexandria monogynia has come to be treated as either liliaceous or amaryllidaceaeous (see Taxonomy of Liliaceae) over time. From 1763, when Michel Adanson conceived of these genera as 'Liliaceae' it was included in this family, placing Amaryllis in Section VII, Narcissi of his scheme, in which the Liliaceae had eight sections.

With de Jussieu came the formal establishment of organising genera into families (ordo) in 1789. De Jussieu established the hierarchical system of taxonomy (phylogeny), placing Amaryllis and 15 related genera within a division of monocotyledons, a class (III) of Stamina Perigynia and 'order' Narcisse, divided into three subfamilies. This system also formally described the Liliaceae, which were a separate order within the Stamina perigynia (Lilia). The use of the term Ordo (order) at that time was closer to what we now understand as family, rather than order. In creating his scheme, De Jussieu used a modified form of Linnaeus' sexual classification, but with the respective topography of stamens to carpels rather than just their numbers.

The family Amaryllidaceae was formally named as 'Amaryllidées' (Amaryllideae) in 1805, by Jean Henri Jaume Saint-Hilaire. In 1810 Brown proposed that a subgroup of Liliaceae be distinguished on the basis of the position of their ovaries (inferior) and be referred to as Amaryllideae and in 1813 de Candolle described Liliacées Juss. and Amaryllidées Brown as two quite separate families. The literature on the organisation of genera into families and higher ranks became available in the English language with Samuel Frederick Gray's A natural arrangement of British plants (1821). Gray used a combination of Linnaeus' sexual classification and Jussieu's natural classification to group together a number of families having in common six equal stamens, a single style and a perianth that was simple and petaloid, but did not use formal names for these higher ranks. Within the grouping, he separated families by the characteristics of their fruit and seed. He treated groups of genera with these characteristics as separate families, such as Amaryllideae, Liliaceae, Asphodeleae, and Asparageae.

John Lindley (1830, 1846) was the other important British taxonomist of the early 19th century. In his first taxonomic work, An Introduction to the Natural System of Botany (1830), he partly followed De Jussieu by describing a subclass he called 'Endogenae, or Monocotyledonous Plants' (preserving de Candolle's Endogenæ phanerogamæ) divided into two tribes, the Petaloidea and Glumaceae. He divided the former, often referred to as petaloid monocots, into 32 orders, including the Amaryllideae. He defined the latter as "Hexapetaloideous bulbous hexandrous monocotyledons, with an inferior ovarium, a six-parted perianthium with equitant sepals, and flat, spongy seeds" and included Amaryllis, Phycella, Nerine, Vallota, and Calostemma.

By 1846, in his final scheme Lindley had greatly expanded and refined the treatment of the monocots, introducing both an intermediate ranking (Alliances) and tribes within families. Lindley placed the Liliaceae within the Liliales, but saw it as a paraphyletic ("catch-all") family, being all Liliales not included in the other orders, but hoped that the future would reveal some characteristic that would group them better. This kept the Liliaceae separate from the Amaryllidaceae (Narcissales Alliance). Of these, Liliaceae was divided into eleven tribes (with 133 genera) and Amaryllidaceae into four tribes (with 68 genera), yet both contained many genera that would eventually segregate to each other's contemporary orders (Liliales and Asparagales respectively). The Liliaceae would be reduced to a small 'core' represented by the tribe Tulipeae (18 genera), while large groups such Scilleae and Asparagae would become part of Asparagales either as part of the Amaryllidaceae or as separate families. While of the four tribes of the Amaryllidaceae, the Amaryllideae and Narcisseae would remain as core amaryllids while the Agaveae would be part of Asparagaceae, but the Alstroemeriae would become a family within the Liliales.

Since then, seven of Linnaeus' Hexandria monogynia genera have consistently been placed in a common taxonomic unit of amaryllids, based on the inferior position of the ovaries (whether this be as an order, suborder, family, subfamily, tribe or section). Thus, much of what we now consider Amaryllidaceae remained in Liliaceae because the ovary was superior, till 1926 when John Hutchinson transferred them to Amaryllidaceae. This usage of the family entered the English language literature through the work of Samuel Frederick Gray (1821), William Herbert (1837) and John Lindley (1830, 1846). Meanwhile, Lindley had described two Chilean genera for which he created a new family, Gilliesieae.

The number of known genera within these families continued to grow and, by the time of the Bentham and Hooker classification (1883), the Amaryllidaceae (Amaryllideae) were divided into four tribes, of which only one (Amarylleae) is still included. The Liliaceae were becoming one of the largest families, and Bentham and Hooker divided it into 20 tribes, of which one was the Allieae, which as Allioideae would eventually become part of Amaryllidaceae as two of its three subfamilies. The Allieae included both Agapantheae, the third of the current subfamilies, and Lindley's Gilliesieae as two of its four subtribes. Bentham and Hooker's scheme was the last major classification using the natural approach.

==== Post-Darwinian ====
Although Charles Darwin's Origin of Species (1859) preceded Bentham and Hooker's publication, the latter project was commenced much earlier and Bentham was initially sceptical of Darwinism. The new phyletic approach changed the way that taxonomists considered plant classification, incorporating evolutionary information into their schemata. The major works in the late 19th and early 20th centuries employing this approach were German, those of Eichler (1875–1886), Engler, Prantl (1886–1924), and Wettstein (1901–1935).

The Amaryllidaceae were treated similarly in the German-language literature to the manner they had been in English. August Eichler (1886) was the first phyletic taxonomist and positioned the Amaryllidaceae and Liliaceae within the Liliiflorae, one of the seven orders of monocotyledons. Liliaceae included both Allium and Ornithogalum (modern Allioideae). Adolf Engler developed Eichler's ideas much further, into much more elaborate schemes that evolved over time, from his 1888 scheme, contributed by Pax to his 1903 version. In the latter, the Liliineae were a suborder of Liliiflorae, including both families Liliaceae and Amaryllidaceae. Within the Liliaceae, the core liliids were segregated in subfamily Lilioideae from the alliaceous subfamily, Allioideae. Allieae, Agapantheae, and Gilliesieae were the three tribes within this subfamily. A somewhat similar approach to Liliiflorae was adopted by Wettstein (without suborders or tribes), and with Alliodeae (Allium) and Lilioideae (Ornithogalum) as subfamilies of Liliaceae. Wettstein's Amaryllidaceae contained three subfamilies, including Amaryllidoideae and Agavoideae.

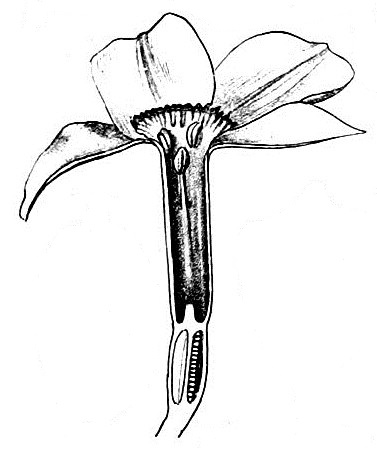
Longitudinal section of Narcissus poeticus, R Wettstein Handbuch der Systematischen Botanik 1901–1924

The early 20th century was marked by increasing doubts about the placement of the alliaceous genera within Liliaceae. Lotsy was the first taxonomist to propose separating them, and in his system he describes Agapanthaceae, Alliaceae, and Gilliesiaceae as new and separate families from Liliaceae. This approach was adopted by a number of other authorities, such as Dahlgren (1985) and Rahn (1998).

Another approach was that of John Hutchinson (1926), who performed the first major recircumscription of the family in over a century. He doubted Brown's dictum that the position of the ovary was the distinguishing feature that separated Amaryllidaceae and Liliaceae. He treated Amaryllidaceae as bulbous plants with umbellate inflorescences, the latter characteristic being the defining feature: "an umbellate inflorescence subtended by an involucre of one or more spathaceous bracts". His work on this has been upheld by subsequent research and his definition remains valid today. Using this criterion, he removed a number of taxa (Agavaceae, Hypoxidaceae, Alstroemeriaceae) and transferred the Agapantheae, Allieae, and Gilliesieae from Liliaceae to Amaryllidaceae.

Other writers proposed reuniting Amaryllidaceae with Liliaceae. Thorne (1976) and Cronquist (1988) both included Amaryllidaceae within a broad concept of Liliaceae (although Thorne later separated them again, but keep Alliaceae as a third family). Thus 'Alliaceae' were variously included in either Liliaceae, Amaryllidaceae, or as a separate entity. This uncertainty of circumscription reflected a wider problem with the petaloid monocots in general. Over the course of time, widely differing views as to the limits of the family have been expressed, so much of the literature dealing with this family requires careful inspection to determine which sense of the Amaryllidaceae the work treats.

==== Phylogenetic era ====
The current phylogenetic era of understanding the taxonomic relationships of Amaryllidaceae began with the work of Fay and Chase (1996) who used the plastid gene rubisco rbcL to identify the close relationship between Agapanthus, Alliaceae, and Amaryllidaceae. Agapanthus had variously been included in Alliaceae or was placed in a separate family, Agapanthaceae. They relocated Agapanthus within Amaryllidaceae as they considered it a sister group to that family. Nevertheless, the Angiosperm Phylogeny Group (APG) classification (1998) still considered these three separate families within Asparagales. The close relationship was confirmed in a more detailed study by Meerow (1999) who confirmed the monophyly of Amaryllidaceae, with Agapanthaceae as its sister family and Alliaceae in turn as sister to the Amaryllidaceae/Agapanthaceae clade.

In its second iteration (2003), the APG proposed simplifying the higher (core) Asparagales by reducing them to two more broadly circumscribed families, and provisionally proposed the name Alliaceae sensu lato (s.l.) to include the three sister families (Agapanthaceae, Alliaceae sensu stricto, s.s., and Amaryllidaceae), since together they form a monophyletic group. In this respect, they were following Hutchinson's system (see above). Under this proposal, the three families became reduced to subfamilies (and by extension the subfamilies of Alliaceae s.s. being reduced to tribes.) At the same time, they appreciated an argument existed for making Amaryllidaceae s.l. the formal name of the new and larger family, a position subsequently strongly supported by Meerow and colleagues.

The 2009 version of the APG formally adopted this broad view and the conserved name Amaryllidaceae. To distinguish this broader family from the older, narrower family, it has become customary to refer to Amaryllidaceae sensu APG, or as used by APG, Amaryllidaceae s.l.. as opposed to Amaryllidaceae s.s..

This phylogenetic tree (cladogram) shows the placement of Amaryllidaceae s.l. within the order Asparagales.

- Asparagales
  - Orchidaceae
  - - - Boryaceae
      - Hypoxidaceae s.l.
        - Blandfordiaceae
        - - Lanariaceae
          - - Asteliaceae
            - Hypoxidaceae
    - - - Ixioliriaceae
        - Tecophilaeaceae
      - - Doryanthaceae
        - - Iridaceae
          - - Xeronemataceae
            - - Xanthorrhoeaceae
              - "Core" (higher) Asparagales
                - - Amaryllidaceae s.l.
                  - Asparagaceae

=== Subdivision ===
As reconstituted by the APG, Amaryllidaceae s.l. consists of three subfamilies, Agapanthoideae, Allioideae, and Amaryllidoideae, corresponding to the three families that were subsumed into it:

- Agapanthoideae (Agapanthaceae)
- Allioideae (Alliaceae)
- Amaryllidoideae (Amaryllidaceae s.s.)

Of these, one (Agapanthoideae) is monogeneric for Agapanthus (see Cladogram I).

Cladogram I: Amaryllidaceae
sensu s.l./APG

- Amaryllidaceae s.l.
  - - Subfamily Agapanthoideae
  - - Subfamily Allioideae
    - Subfamily Amaryllidoideae

Of the other two subfamilies, Allioideae was resolved into three subdivisions by the initial phylogenetic studies of Fay and Chase (1996). Since they treated Allioideae as family Alliaceae, these were subfamilies Allioideae, Tulbaghioideae, and Gilliesioideae. When family Alliaceae was reduced to subfamily Allioideae, they were reduced to tribes, namely Allieae, Tulbaghieae and Gilliesieae (see Cladogram II).

Cladogram II: Allioideae

- Subfamily Allioideae
  - - Tribe
      Allieae
    - - Tribe Tulbaghieae
      - Tribe Gilliesieae

Complete resolution of infrafamilial (suprageneric) relationships within subfamily Amaryllidoideae (Amaryllidaceae s.s.) has proven more difficult. Fay and Chase's study lacked sufficient resolution for further elucidation of this group. Historically a wide variety of infrafamilial classification systems have been proposed for the Amaryllidaceae. In the latter twentieth century there were at least six schemes, including Hutchinson (1926), Traub (1963), Dahlgren (1985), Müller-Doblies and Müller-Doblies (1996), Hickey and King (1997) and Meerow and Snijman (1998). Hutchinson was an early proponent of the larger Amaryllidaceae, transferring taxa from Liliaceae and had three tribes, Agapantheae, Allieae and Gilliesieae. Traub (who provides a brief history of the family) largely followed Hutchinson, but with four subfamilies (Allioideae, Hemerocalloideae, Ixiolirioideae and Amaryllidoideae), the Amaryllidoideae he then divided further into two "infrafamilies", Amarylloidinae and Pancratioidinae, an arrangement with 23 tribes in total. In Dahlgren's system, a "splitter" who favoured larger numbers of smaller families, he adopted a narrower circumscription than Traub, using only the latter's Amaryllidoideae which he treated as eight tribes. Müller-Doblies described ten tribes (and 19 subtribes). Hickey and King described ten tribes by which the family were divided, such as the Zephyrantheae. Meerow and Snijder considered thirteen tribes, one (Amaryllideae) with two subtribes (for a comparison of these schemes see Meerow et al. 1999, Table I).

The further application of molecular phylogenetics produced a complex picture that only partially related to the tribal structure considered up to that date, which had been based on morphology alone. Rather, Amaryllidaceae resolved along biogeographical lines. A predominantly South African clade identified as Amaryllideae was a sister group to the rest of the family. The two other African tribes were Haemantheae and Cyrtantheae, and an Australasian tribe Calostemmateae was also identified, but a large clade could only be described as Eurasian and American, each of which were monophyletic sister clades to each other. The Eurasian clade was poorly resolved with the exception of Lycorideae (Central and East Asian). The American clade was better resolved identifying both Hippeastreae as a tribe (and Zephyranthinae as a subtribe within it). The American clade also included an Andean clade.

Further investigation of the American clade suggested the presence of two groups, the Andean clade and a further "Hippeastroid" clade, in which Griffineae was sister to the rest of the clade (Hippeastreae). Similarly, within the Andean clade, Eustephieae appeared as sister to the remaining clade, including Hymenocallideae. A new tribe, Clinantheae was also identified in this group.

The Eurasian clade was also further resolved (for historical treatment, see Table I Meerow et al. 2006) into four tribes, Pancratieae, Narcisseae, Galantheae and Lycorideae. This positioned Lycorideae as sister to the remaining Mediterranean tribes.

These relationships are summarised in the following cladogram:

Cladogram III: Tribes of subfamily Amaryllidoideae

- Subfamily Amaryllidoideae
  - Africa
    Tribe Amaryllideae
  - - - Africa
        Tribe Cyrtantheae
      - - Africa
          Tribe Haemantheae
        - Australasia
          Tribe Calostemmateae
    - - Eurasian clade
        - Asia
          Tribe Lycorideae
        - Mediterranean
          - Tribe Galantheae
          - - Tribe Pancratieae
            - Tribe Narcisseae
      - American clade
        - Hippeastroid clade
          - Tribe Griffineae
          - Tribe Hippeastreae
        - Andean clade
          - - Tribe Eustephieae
          - - Tribe Stenomesseae
            - - - Tribe Clinantheae
                - Tribe Hymenocallideae

==== Angiosperm Phylogeny Group ====
Publication of the third version of the APG classification and acceptance of Amaryllidaceae s.l. was accompanied by a listing of accepted subfamily and tribal names, since the change in rank from family to subfamily necessitated a revision of other lower ranks, as follows:

Family: Amaryllidaceae J.St.-Hil., Expos. Fam. Nat. 1: 134. Feb–Apr 1805, nom. cons.

- Subfamily: Agapanthoideae Endl., Gen. Pl.: 141. Dec 1836. (1 genus)
- Subfamily: Allioideae Herb., Amaryllidaceae: 48. late Apr 1837.
  - Tribe Allieae Dumort., Fl. Belg.: 139. 1827. (1 genus)
  - Tribe Gilliesieae Baker, J. Linn. Soc., Bot. 14: 509. 24 April 1875. (18 genera)
  - Tribe Tulbaghieae Endl. ex Meisn., Pl. Vasc. Gen.: Tab. Diagn. 397, 399, Comm. 302. 17–20 Dec 1842. (2 genera)
- Subfamily: Amaryllidoideae Burnett, Outl. Bot.: 446. Feb 1835 (15 tribes)
  - Tribe Amaryllideae Dumort., Anal. Fam. Pl.: 58. 1829.
  - Tribe Calostemmateae D.Müll.-Doblies & U.Müll.Doblies, Feddes Repert. 107 (Short commun.): 7 December 1996.
  - Tribe Cyrtantheae Traub, Herbertia 5: 111. Nov 1938.
  - Tribe Eucharideae Hutch., Fam.Fl.Pl.2:130.20 Jul 1934.
  - Tribe Eustephieae Hutch., Fam.Fl.Pl.2:130.20 Jul 1934.
  - Tribe Galantheae Parl., Fl. Ital. 3: 75. 1858.
  - Tribe Gethyllideae Dumort., Anal. Fam. Pl.: 58. 1829.
  - Tribe Haemantheae Hutch., Fam. Fl. Pl. 2: 130. 20 July 1934.
  - Tribe Hippeastreae Herb. ex Sweet, Brit. Fl. Gard., ser. 2, 1: ad t. 14. 1 September 1829.
  - Tribe Hymenocallideae Small, Man. S.E. Fl.: 315. 30 November 1933.
  - Tribe Lycorideae Traub ex D.Müll.-Doblies & U.Müll.Doblies, Feddes Repert. 107 (Short commun.): 6. Dec. 1996.
  - Tribe Narcisseae Lam. & DC., Syn. Pl. Fl. Gall.: 165. 30 June 1806.
  - Tribe Pancratieae Dumort., Anal. Fam. Pl.: 58. 1829.
  - Tribe Stenomesseae Traub, Pl. Life 19: 60. Jan 1963

This circumscription differs from the phylogenetic descriptions of Meerow and colleagues in several respects. Griffineae is recognised as a distinct tribe within the Hippeastroid clade, and Stenomesseae is recognised as polyphyletic with two distinct types based on leaf shape (lorate-leafed and petiolate-leafed). The lorate-leafed species of the type genus of Stenomesseae, Stemomesson, were transferred to a new tribe, Clinantheae as sister to Hymenocallideae in the Andean clade. The remnants of Stemomesson then formed a distinct clade with Eucharis (Eucharidae) and Eucharidae renamed as Stenomesseae (see Cladogram III).

- Tribe Griffineae Ravenna
- Tribe Clinantheae Meerow

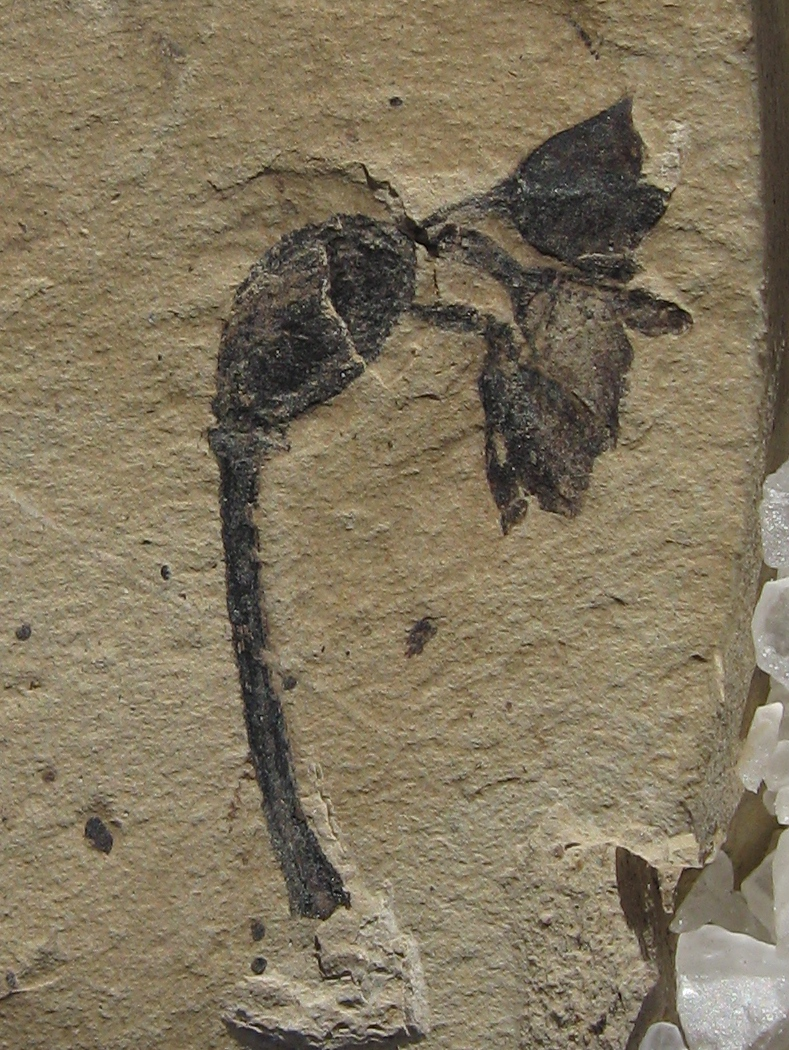
Paleoallium holotype fossil

==== Genera ====
Plants of the World Online accepts 71 genera. The Angiosperm Phylogeny Website lists 73 genera and 1,605 species within Amaryllidaceae s.l., while The Plant List (2013) listed 80 genera and 2,258 species. The Asparagales fossil record is scant, and the 2018 description of Ypresian age bulbils as †Paleoallium were the first Amaryllidaceae .

- Acis Salisb.
- Agapanthus L'Hér.
- Allium L.
- Amaryllis L.
- Ammocharis Herb.
- Apodolirion Baker
- Atacamallium Nic.García
- Boophone Herb.
- Brunsvigia Heist.
- Calostemma R.Br.
- Cearanthes Ravenna
- Chlidanthus Herb.
- Clinanthus Herb.
- Clivia Lindl.
- Crinum L.
- Crossyne Salisb.
- Cryptostephanus Welw. ex Baker
- Cyrtanthus Aiton
- Eucrosia Ker Gawl.
- Eustephia Cav.
- Galanthus L.
- Gethyllis L.
- Gilliesia Lindl.
- Griffinia Ker Gawl.
- Haemanthus L.
- Hannonia Braun-Blanq. & Maire
- Hessea Herb.
- Hieronymiella Pax
- Hippeastrum Herb.
- Hymenocallis Salisb.
- Ipheion Raf.
- Ismene Salisb. ex Herb.
- Lapiedra Lag.
- Latace Phil.
- Leptochiton Sealy
- Leucocoryne Lindl.
- Leucojum L.
- Lycoris Herb.
- Mathieua Klotzsch
- Miersia Lindl.
- × Myobranthus ined.
- Namaquanula D.Müll.-Doblies & U.Müll.-Doblies
- Narcissus L.
- Nerine Herb.
- Nothoscordum Kunth
- Pamianthe Stapf
- Pancratium Dill. ex L.
- Paposoa Nic.García
- Paramongaia Velarde
- Phaedranassa Herb.
- Phycella Lindl.
- Plagiolirion Baker
- Proiphys Herb.
- Pyrolirion Herb.
- Rauhia Traub
- Rhodolirium Phil.
- Scadoxus Raf.
- Schickendantziella Speg.
- Shoubiaonia W.H.Qin, W.Q.Meng & Kun Liu
- Sprekelia Heist.
- Stenomesson Herb.
- Sternbergia Waldst. & Kit.
- Strumaria Jacq.
- Traubia Moldenke
- Trichlora Baker
- Tristagma Poepp.
- Tulbaghia L.
- Ungernia Bunge
- Urceolina Rchb.
- Vagaria Herb.
- Worsleya (Traub) Traub
- Zephyranthes Herb.

== Distribution ==
Amaryllidaceae are a cosmopolitan family, whose distribution is pantropical to subtropical, but infrafamilial relationships are related to geographical considerations. The tribe Amaryllideae is primarily South African, and Haemantheae and Cyrtantheae are also African, while the Calostemmateae are Australasian. Other elements are Eurasian and American, including an Andean subclade without necessarily following strictly tribal delimitations. This leads to discussions of, for instance, American Amaryllidaceae. The Eurasian clade includes Lycorideae. The American clade includes the Hippeastreae, Eustephieae and Zephyranthinae.

== Cultivation and uses ==
The Amaryllidaceae include many ornamental garden plants such as daffodils, snowdrops and snowflake, pot plants such as amaryllis and Clivia, and vegetables, such as onions, chives, leeks and garlic. A number of tropical lily-like plants are also sold, such as the belladonna lily, Amazon lily, blood lily (Cape tulip), Cornish lily (Nerine), and the Eurasian winter daffodil, Sternbergia.

Their economic importance lies in floriculture for cut flowers and bulbs, and commercial vegetable production.

== Bibliography ==
=== Books ===
==== Historical ====
- Linnaeus, C. (1753). Species Plantarum: exhibentes plantas rite cognitas, ad genera relatas, cum differentiis specificis, nominibus trivialibus, synonymis selectis, locis natalibus, secundum systema sexuale digestas. Stockholm: Impensis Laurentii Salvii. see also Species Plantarum
- Adanson, Michel (1763). Familles des plantes. Paris: Vincent.

Table of 58 families, Part II: Page 1
Table of 1615 genera, Part II: Page 8

- Jussieu, Antoine Laurent de (1789). Genera Plantarum, secundum ordines naturales disposita juxta methodum in Horto Regio Parisiensi exaratam. Paris: apud viduam Herissant et Theophilum Barrois.
- Jaume Saint-Hilaire, Jean Henri (1805). Exposition de familles naturales. Paris: Treutel et Würtz.
- Brown, Robert (1810). Prodromus florae Novae Hollandiae et Insulae Van-Diemen, exhibens characteres plantarum. London: Taylor.
- Candolle, A. P. de (1813). Théorie élémentaire de la botanique, ou exposition des principes de la classification naturelle et de l'art de décrire et d'etudier les végétaux (in French).
- Gray, Samuel Frederick (1821). A natural arrangement of British plants: according to their relations to each other as pointed out by Jussieu, De Candolle, Brown, &c. including those cultivated for use; with an introduction to botany, in which the terms newly introduced are explained. London: Baldwin.
- Lindley, John (1830). An introduction to the natural system of botany : or, A systematic view of the organisation, natural affinities, and geographical distribution, of the whole vegetable kingdom : together with the uses of the most important species in medicine, the arts, and rural or domestic economy. London: Longman.
- Herbert, William (1837). Amaryllidaceae: Preceded by an Attempt to Arrange the Monocotyledonous Orders, and Followed by a Treatise on Cross-bred Vegetables, and Supplement. London: Ridgway.
- Lindley, John (1846). The Vegetable Kingdom: or, The structure, classification, and uses of plants, illustrated upon the natural system. London: Bradbury.
- Bentham, G.; Hooker, J.D. (1883). Genera plantarum ad exemplaria imprimis in herbariis kewensibus servata definita (3 vols. 1865–1883). London: L Reeve & Co.
- Eichler, August W. (1886) [1876]. Syllabus der Vorlesungen über specielle und medicinisch-pharmaceutische Botanik (4th ed.). Berlin: Borntraeger.
- Baker, John Gilbert (1888). Handbook of the Amaryllideæ including the Alstrœmerieæ and Agaveæ. London: Bell.
- Engler, Adolf; Prantl, Karl, eds. (1888). Die Natürlichen Pflanzenfamilien nebst ihren Gattungen und wichtigeren Arten, insbesondere den Nutzpflanzen, unter Mitwirkung zahlreicher hervorragender Fachgelehrten 1887–1915 II(5). Leipzig: W. Engelmann.
- Engler, Adolf, ed. (1900–1968). Das Pflanzenreich :regni vegetablilis conspectus. Leipzig: Engelmann.
- Engler, Adolf, ed. (1903). Syllabus der Pflanzenfamilien: eine Übersicht über das gesamte Pflanzensystem mit Berücksichtigung der Medicinal- und Nutzpflanzen nebst einer Übersicht über die Florenreiche und Florengebiete der Erde zum Gebrauch bei Vorlesungen und Studien über specielle und medicinisch-pharmaceutische Botanik (3 ed.). Berlin: Gebrüder Borntraeger Verlag.
- Wettstein, Richard (1924). Handbuch der Systematischen Botanik 2 vols (3rd ed.). Archived from the original on 18 February 2015.

==== Modern ====
- Byng, James W. (2014). The Flowering Plants Handbook: A Practical Guide to Families and Genera of the World. Plant Gateway Ltd. ISBN 978-0992999308.
- Lotsy, J. P. (1911). Vorträge über botanische stammesgeschichte, gehalten an der Reichsuniversität zu Leiden. Ein lehrbuch der pflanzensystematick. III Cormophyta Siphonogamia. Jena: G. Fischer.
- Hutchinson, John (1934). The families of flowering plants, arranged according to a new system based on their probable phylogeny. 2 vols (1st ed.). Macmillan. Volume 1: Monocotyledonae 1926, Volume 2: Dicotyledonae 1934.
- Hutchinson, John (1959). The families of flowering plants, arranged according to a new system based on their probable phylogeny. 2 vols (2 ed.). Macmillan.
- Hutchinson, John (1973). The families of flowering plants, arranged according to a new system based on their probable phylogeny. 2 vols (3 ed.). Oxford University Press.
- Cronquist, A (1981). An integrated system of classification of flowering plants. New York: Columbia University Press. ISBN 9780231038805.
- Cronquist, Arthur (1988). The evolution and classification of flowering plants (2 ed.). Bronx, New York: New York Botanical Garden. ISBN 978-0893273323.
- Dahlgren, R.M.; Clifford, H.T.; Yeo, P.F. (1985). The families of the monocotyledons. Berlin: Springer-Verlag. ISBN 978-3-642-64903-5.
- Rahn, K. (1998). "Alliaceae". In Kubitzki, K. (ed.). Flowering Plants · Monocotyledons. Vol. 3. Berlin, Germany: Springer-Verlag. pp. 70–78. doi:10.1007/978-3-662-03533-7_9. ISBN 978-3-540-64060-8.
- Meerow, Alan; Snijman, Deirdré (1998). "Amaryllidaceae". In Kubitzki, K. (ed.). Flowering Plants · Monocotyledons. Vol. 3. Berlin, Germany: Springer-Verlag. pp. 83–110. doi:10.1007/978-3-662-03533-7_11. ISBN 978-3-540-64060-8. S2CID 240114483.
- Rossi, Rosella (1990). Guía de bulbos. Barcelona: Grijalbo. ISBN 978-8425321658.
- Rina Kamenetsky; Hiroshi Okubo, eds. (2012). Ornamental Geophytes: From Basic Science to Sustainable Production. CRC Press. ISBN 978-1-4398-4924-8.
  - Chapter 2. Alan Meerow. Taxonomy and Phylogeny. pp. 17–55
- Dimitri, M (1987). Enciclopedia Argentina de Agricultura y Jardinería. Tomo I. Descripción de plantas cultivadas. Buenos Aires: Editorial ACME S.A.C.I. see Enciclopedia Argentina de Agricultura y Jardinería
- McGary, Mary Jane (2001). Bulbs of North America. Timber Press. ISBN 978-0-88192-511-1.
- Hickey, Michael; King, Clive (1997). Common families of flowering plants. Cambridge: Cambridge University Press. ISBN 978-0521576093.
- Stuessy, Tod F. (2009). Plant Taxonomy: The Systematic Evaluation of Comparative Data. Columbia University Press. ISBN 978-0-231-14712-5.
- Meerow, Alan W.; Fay, Michael F.; Chase, Mark W.; Guy, Charles L.; Li, Qin-Bao; Snijman, Deirdre; Yang, Si-Lin (2000). Phylogeny of Amaryllidaceae: Molecules and morphology. Csiro. pp. 372–386. ISBN 9780643099296., in Wilson & Morrison (2000)
- Meerow, Alan. Towards a phylogeny of the Amaryllidaceae. pp. 169–179., in Rudall et al. (1995)
- Pax, Ferdinand (1887). Amaryllidaceae. Vol. Teil 2, Abt. 1–6. W. Engelmann. pp. 97–124., in Engler & Prantl (1888)
- Traub, H.P. (1963). Genera of the Amaryllidaceae. La Jolla, California: American Plant Life Society.

=== Symposia ===
- Rudall, P.J.; Cribb, P.J.; Cutler, D.F.; Humphries, C.J., eds. (1995). Monocotyledons: systematics and evolution (Proceedings of the International Symposium on Monocotyledons: Systematics and Evolution, Kew 1993). Kew: Royal Botanic Gardens. ISBN 978-0-947643-85-0.
- Wilson, K. L.; Morrison, D. A., eds. (19 May 2000). Monocots: Systematics and evolution (Proceedings of the Second International Conference on the Comparative Biology of the Monocotyledons, Sydney, Australia 1998). Collingwood, Australia: CSIRO. ISBN 978-0-643-06437-9. Excerpts

=== Articles and theses ===
- Cutler, David F.; Gregory, Mary (13 October 1983). "Current anatomical research in Liliaceae, Amaryllidaceae and Iridaceae". Telopea. 2 (4): 425–452. Bibcode:1983Telop...2..425C. doi:10.7751/telopea19834408.
- Fay, Michael F.; Chase, Mark W. (August 1996). "Resurrection of Themidaceae for the Brodiaea alliance, and Recircumscription of Alliaceae, Amaryllidaceae and Agapanthoideae". Taxon. 45 (3): 441–451. Bibcode:1996Taxon..45..441F. doi:10.2307/1224136. JSTOR 1224136.
- García, Nicolás; Meerow, Alan W.; Soltis, Douglas E.; Soltis, Pamela S. (1 March 2014). "Testing Deep Reticulate Evolution in Amaryllidaceae Tribe Hippeastreae (Asparagales) with ITS and Chloroplast Sequence Data". Systematic Botany. 39 (1): 75–89. Bibcode:2014SysBo..39...75G. doi:10.1600/036364414X678099. S2CID 86117335.
- Jimenez, H.J.; da Silva, A.D.F.; Martins, L.S.S.; de Carvalho, R.; de Moraes Filho, R. M. (2020). "Comparative genomics plastomes of the Amaryllidaceae family species". Scientia Plena. 16 (6): 1–10. doi:10.14808/sci.plena.2020.060202. Full text
- Meerow, A.W.; Fay, M.F.; Guy, C.L.; Li, Q.-B.; Zaman, F.Q.; Chase, M.W. (1999). "Systematics of Amaryllidaceae based on cladistic analysis of plastid rbcL and trnL-F sequence data". Am. J. Bot. 86 (9): 1325–1345. doi:10.2307/2656780. JSTOR 2656780. PMID 10487820.
- Meerow, A.W.; Guy, C.L.; Li, Q.-B.; Yang, S.-L. (2000). "Phylogeny of the American Amaryllidaceae Based on nrDNA ITS Sequences" (PDF). Systematic Botany. 25 (4): 708–726. Bibcode:2000SysBo..25..708M. doi:10.2307/2666729. JSTOR 2666729. S2CID 20392462. Archived from the original (PDF) on 23 September 2015.
- Meerow, Alan W.; Snijman, Deirdre A. (December 2001). "Phylogeny of Amaryllidaceae Tribe Amaryllideae Based on nrDNA ITS Sequences and Morphology". American Journal of Botany. 88 (12): 2321–2330. Bibcode:2001AmJB...88.2321M. doi:10.2307/3558392. JSTOR 3558392. PMID 21669663. Archived from the original on 26 February 2019.
- Meerow, Alan W.; Guy, Charles L.; Li, Qin-Bao; Clayton, Jason R. (2002). "Phylogeny of the Tribe Hymenocallideae (Amaryllidaceae) Based on Morphology and Molecular Characters". Annals of the Missouri Botanical Garden. 89 (3): 400–413. Bibcode:2002AnMBG..89..400M. doi:10.2307/3298600. JSTOR 3298600.
- Meerow, Alan W.; Clayton, Jason R. (1 February 2004). "Generic relationships among the baccate-fruited Amaryllidaceae (tribe Haemantheae) inferred from plastid and nuclear non-coding DNA sequences". Plant Systematics and Evolution. 244 (3–4): 141–155. Bibcode:2004PSyEv.244..141M. doi:10.1007/s00606-003-0085-z. S2CID 10245220.
- Meerow, Alan W.; van der Werff, Henk (1 July 2004). "Pucara (Amaryllidaceae) Reduced to Synonymy with Stenomesson on the Basis of Nuclear and Plastid DNA Spacer Sequences, and a New Related Species of Stenomesson". Systematic Botany. 29 (3): 511–517. Bibcode:2004SysBo..29..511M. doi:10.1600/0363644041744400. S2CID 85742067.
- Meerow, AW; Francisco-Ortega, J; Schnell, RJ (2006). "Phylogenetic relationships and biogeography within the Eurasian clade of Amaryllidaceae based on plastid ndhF and nrDNA ITS sequences: lineage sorting in a reticulate area?". Systematic Botany. 31 (1): 42–60. Bibcode:2006SysBo..31...42M. doi:10.1600/036364406775971787. JSTOR 25064128. S2CID 85953035. Full text
- Meerow, Alan W.; Snijman, Deirdre A. (2006). "The never-ending story: multigene approaches to the phylogeny of Amaryllidaceae". Aliso. 22: 355–366. doi:10.5642/aliso.20062201.29.
- Meerow, Alan W.; Reveal, James L.; Snijman, Deirdre A.; Dutilh, Julie H. (November 2007). "(1793) Proposal to conserve the name Amaryllidaceae against Alliaceae, a "superconservation" proposal". Taxon. 56 (4): 1299–1300. Bibcode:2007Taxon..56.1299M. doi:10.2307/25065925. JSTOR 25065925.
- Müller-Doblies, Dietrich; Müller-Doblies, Ute (1978). "Studies on tribal systematics of Amaryllidoideae: 1. The systematic position of Lapiedra Lag". Lagascalia. 8 (1): 13–23.
- Müller-Doblies, U.; Müller-Doblies, D. (1996). "Tribes and subtribes and some species combinations in Amaryllidaceae J St Hil R Dahlgren & al. 1985". Feddes Repertorium. 107 (5–6): S.c.1–S.c.9.
- Thorne, Robert F. (1976). "A Phylogenetic Classification of the Angiospermae". Evolutionary morphology of the rattlesnake style. Vol. 9. pp. 35–106. doi:10.1007/978-1-4615-6950-3_2. ISBN 978-1-4615-6952-7. PMC 2645363. PMID 19208237.
- Thorne, R. F. (1992). "Classification and geography of the flowering plants". The Botanical Review. 58 (3): 225–348. Bibcode:1992BotRv..58..225T. doi:10.1007/BF02858611. S2CID 40348158.
- Weber, Odile; Wilkin, Paul (May 2007). "588. Stenomesson pearcei". Curtis's Botanical Magazine. 24 (2): 114–120. doi:10.1111/j.1467-8748.2007.00572.x.
- Strydom, Aéle (2005). Phylogenetic relationships in the family Amaryllidaceae (PDF). Department of Plant Sciences, University of the Free State. Archived from the original (PhD thesis) on 30 April 2011.

==== APG system ====
- Angiosperm Phylogeny Group (1998). "An ordinal classification for the families of flowering plants". Annals of the Missouri Botanical Garden. 85 (4): 531–553. Bibcode:1998AnMBG..85..531.. doi:10.2307/2992015. JSTOR 2992015.
- Angiosperm Phylogeny Group (April 2003). "An update of the Angiosperm Phylogeny Group classification for the orders and families of flowering plants: APG II". Botanical Journal of the Linnean Society. 141 (4): 399–436. doi:10.1046/j.1095-8339.2003.t01-1-00158.x.
- Angiosperm Phylogeny Group (2009). "An update of the Angiosperm Phylogeny Group classification for the orders and families of flowering plants: APG III". Botanical Journal of the Linnean Society. 161 (2): 105–121. doi:10.1111/j.1095-8339.2009.00996.x.
- APG IV (2016). "An update of the Angiosperm Phylogeny Group classification for the orders and families of flowering plants: APG IV". Botanical Journal of the Linnean Society. 181 (1): 1–20. doi:10.1111/boj.12385.
- Chase, M.W.; Reveal, J.L.; Fay, M.F. (2009). "A subfamilial classification for the expanded asparagalean families Amaryllidaceae, Asparagaceae and Xanthorrhoeaceae". Botanical Journal of the Linnean Society. 161 (2): 132–136. doi:10.1111/j.1095-8339.2009.00999.x.

=== Pharmacology ===
- Ronsted, N; Symonds, MR; Birkholm, T; Christensen, SB; Meerow, AW (2012). "Can phylogeny predict chemical diversity and potential medicinal activity of plants? A case study of Amaryllidaceae". BMC Evol Biol. 12 (1): 182. Bibcode:2012BMCEE..12..182R. doi:10.1186/1471-2148-12-182. PMC 3499480. PMID 22978363.
- Takos, Adam; Rook, Fred (31 May 2013). "Towards a Molecular Understanding of the Biosynthesis of Amaryllidaceae Alkaloids in Support of Their Expanding Medical Use". International Journal of Molecular Sciences. 14 (6): 11713–11741. doi:10.3390/ijms140611713. PMC 3709753. PMID 23727937.

=== Websites ===
- Vigneron, Pascal. "Amaryllidaceae". Amaryllidaceae.org (in French). Archived from the original on 4 January 2015.
- Meerow, A (2009). "Neotropical Amaryllidaceae". Milliken, W., Klitgård, B. & Baracat, A. Neotropikey – Interactive key and information resources for flowering plants of the Neotropics.
- Dutilh, J.H.A. (2009). "Neotropical Alliaceae". Milliken, W., Klitgård, B. & Baracat, A. Neotropikey – Interactive key and information resources for flowering plants of the Neotropics.
- "Linnaeus Sexual System". CronkLab. Biodiversity Research Centre, University of British Columbia.
- ICN (2011). "International Code of Nomenclature for algae, fungi, and plants". Bratislava: International Association for Plant Taxonomy.
- "Pacific Bulb Society". Pacific Bulb Society. 2012.

=== Databases ===
- "Amaryllidaceae". The Plant List (2013). Version 1.1. 2013.
- "Quick Search". World Checklist of Selected Plant Families. Royal Botanic Gardens, Kew.
- Stevens, P.F. (2016) [2001]. Angiosperm Phylogeny Website. Missouri Botanical Gardens.
- Wilkin, Paul (2012). "Amaryllidaceae J.St.-Hil". eMonocot. Archived from the original on 26 October 2014.
- "Amaryllidaceae: A taxonomic tool for the Amaryllidaceae of the world". eMonocot. Archived from the original on 4 March 2016.
- "Amaryllidaceae". International Plant Names Index (IPNI). Royal Botanic Gardens, Kew; Harvard University Herbaria & Libraries; Australian National Botanic Gardens.
