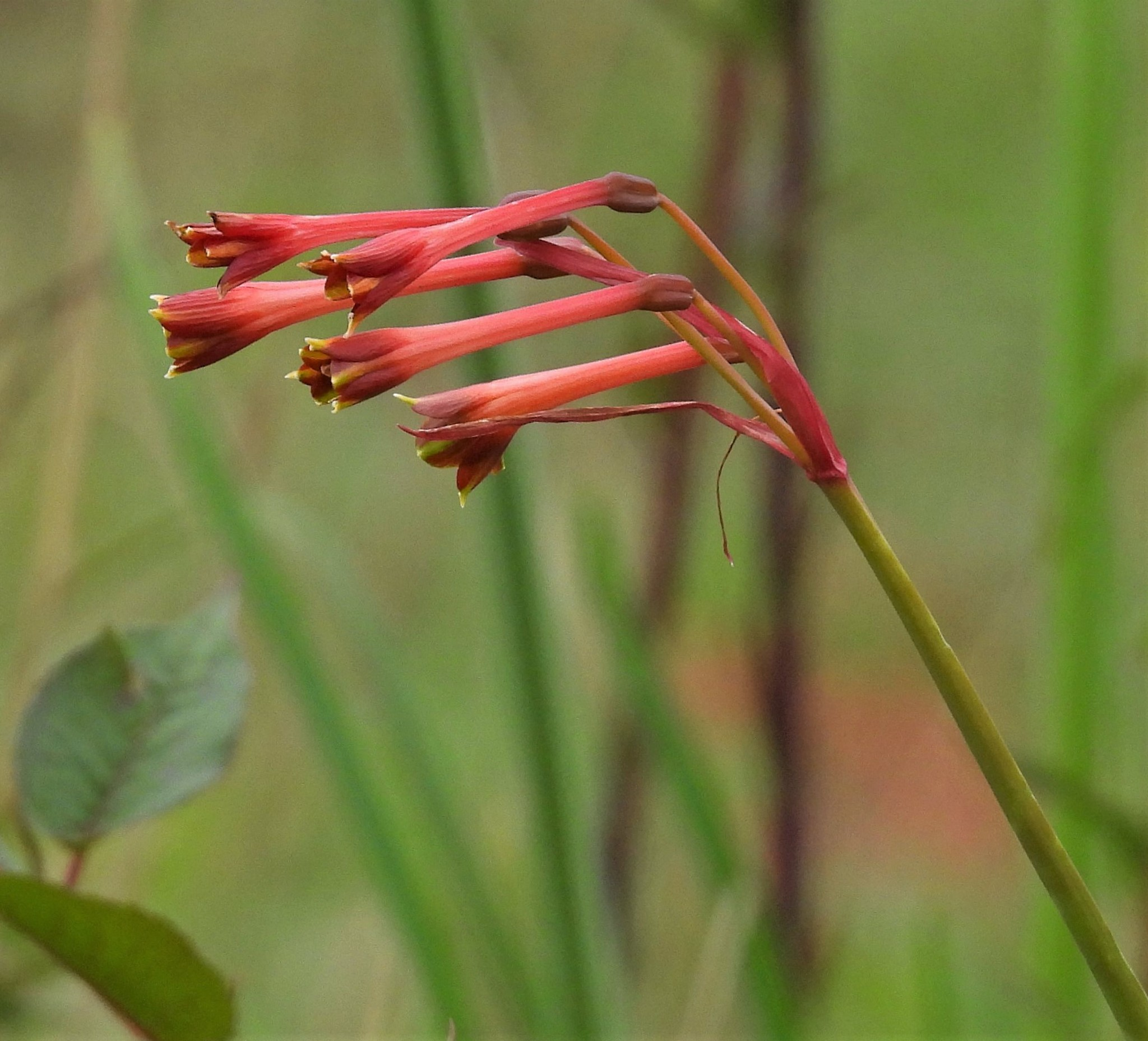
- Hieronymiella argentina

Scientific classification
- Kingdom: Plantae
- Clade: Tracheophytes
- Clade: Angiosperms
- Clade: Monocots
- Order: Asparagales
- Family: Amaryllidaceae
- Subfamily: Amaryllidoideae
- Tribe: Eustephieae
- Genus: Hieronymiella; Pax

Type species
- Hieronymiella clidanthoides Pax

Synonyms
- Eustephiopsis R.E.Fr.; Androstephanos Fern.Casas

= Hieronymiella =

Genus of flowering plants

Hieronymiella is a genus of flowering plants in the Amaryllis family. It is native to Bolivia, north-western Argentina, and southern Peru.

== Description ==
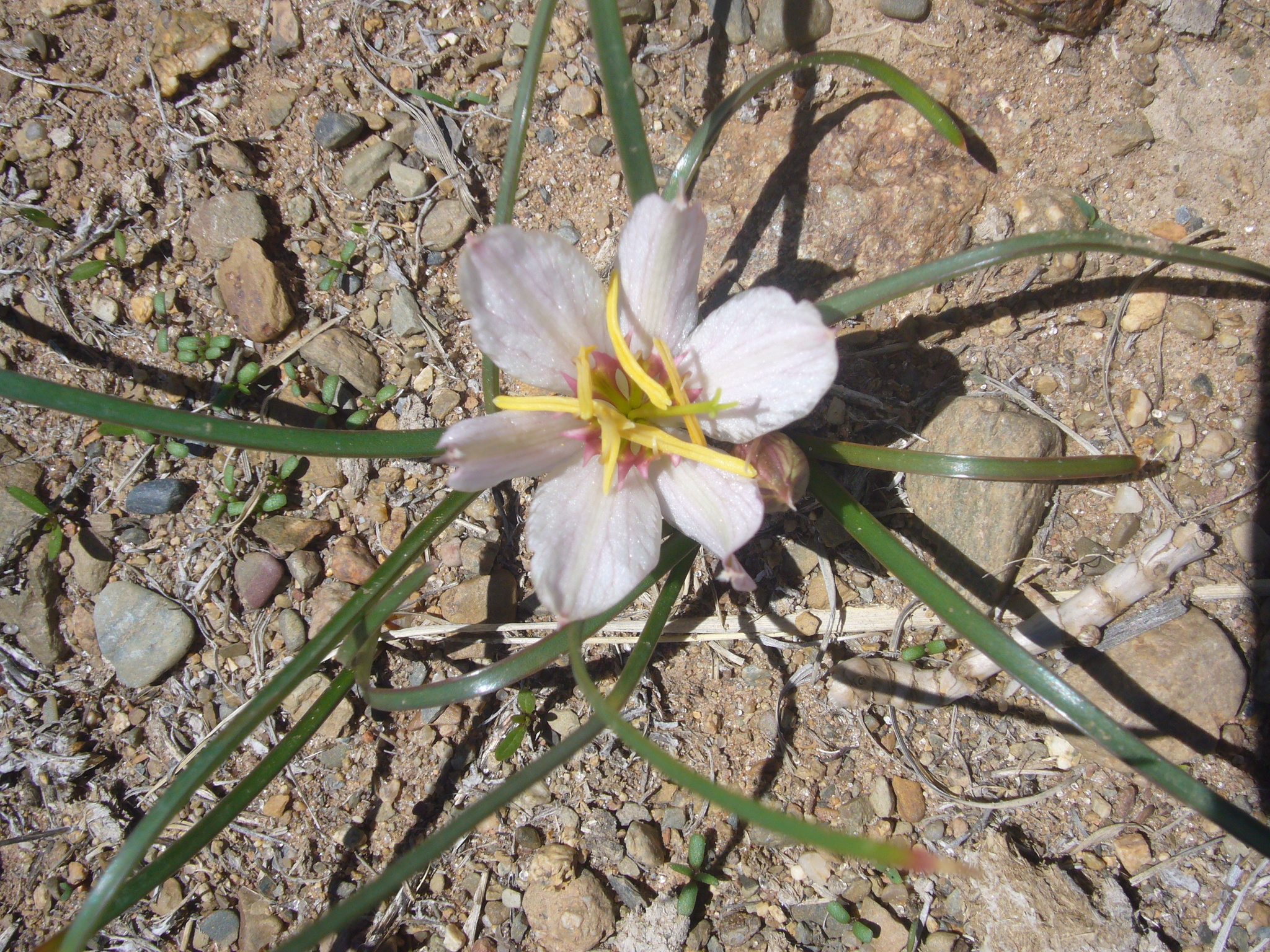
Hieronymiella speciosa

=== Vegetative characteristics ===
Hieronymiella are perennial bulbous plants with strap-shaped leaves.

=== Generative characteristics ===
The white, purple, yellow, or pink, sometimes fragrant flowers have an elongate, funnel shaped perigone. The flowers have a conspicuous corona with six lobes.

== Cytology ==
Various diploid chromosome counts have been observed: 2n = 42, 54, 56, 60.

== Taxonomy ==
It was first published by Ferdinand Albin Pax (1858-1942) in 1889 with Hieronymiella clidanthoides Pax as the type species. It is named in honour of Georg Hans Emmo Wolfgang Hieronymus (1846 - 1921).

=== Species ===
There are 10 species recognised:

- Hieronymiella angustissima Ravenna - Jujuy
- Hieronymiella argentina (Pax) Hunz. & S.C.Arroyo - Argentina, Bolivia
- Hieronymiella aurea Ravenna - Salta
- Hieronymiella bedelarii R.Lara & Huaylla
- Hieronymiella cachiensis Ravenna - Salta
- Hieronymiella caletensis Ravenna - Jujuy
- Hieronymiella cardenasii (Traub) R.Lara
- Hieronymiella clidanthoides Pax. - northwestern Argentina from Salta to Mendoza
- Hieronymiella pamiana (Stapf) Hunz. - Tucumán
- Hieronymiella speciosa (R.E.Fr.) Hunz. - Jujuy, Salta

Additionally, Hieronymiella peruviana Huaylla, Slanis & Llalla was described from Moquegua, southern Peru.
