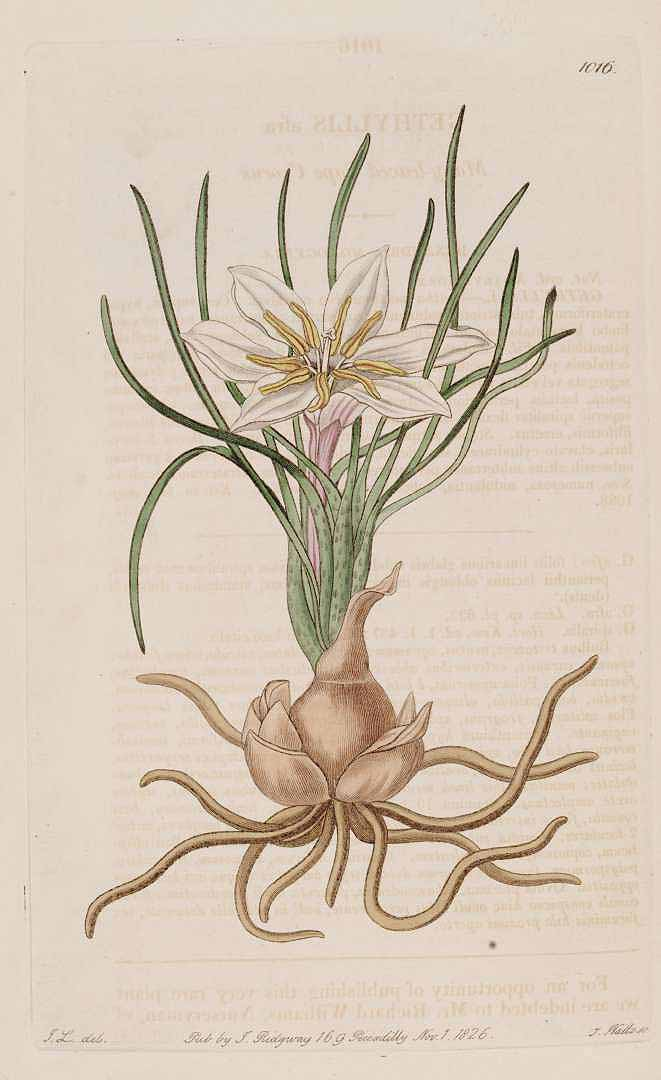
- Gethyliis afra

Scientific classification
- Kingdom: Plantae
- Clade: Tracheophytes
- Clade: Angiosperms
- Clade: Monocots
- Order: Asparagales
- Family: Amaryllidaceae
- Subfamily: Amaryllidoideae
- Tribe: Haemantheae
- Subtribe: Gethyllidinae; Dumort.

Type genus
- Gethyllis L.

Genera
- Apodolirion; Gethyllis

Synonyms
- Gethylleae Traub

= Gethyllidinae =

Subtribe of flowering plants

Gethyllidinae is a small subtribe within the amaryllis family. It is within tribe Haemantheae, and therefore within the African clades of Amaryllidoideae. It contains two genera, Gethyllis and Apodolirion, both are endemic to southern Africa.

== Description ==
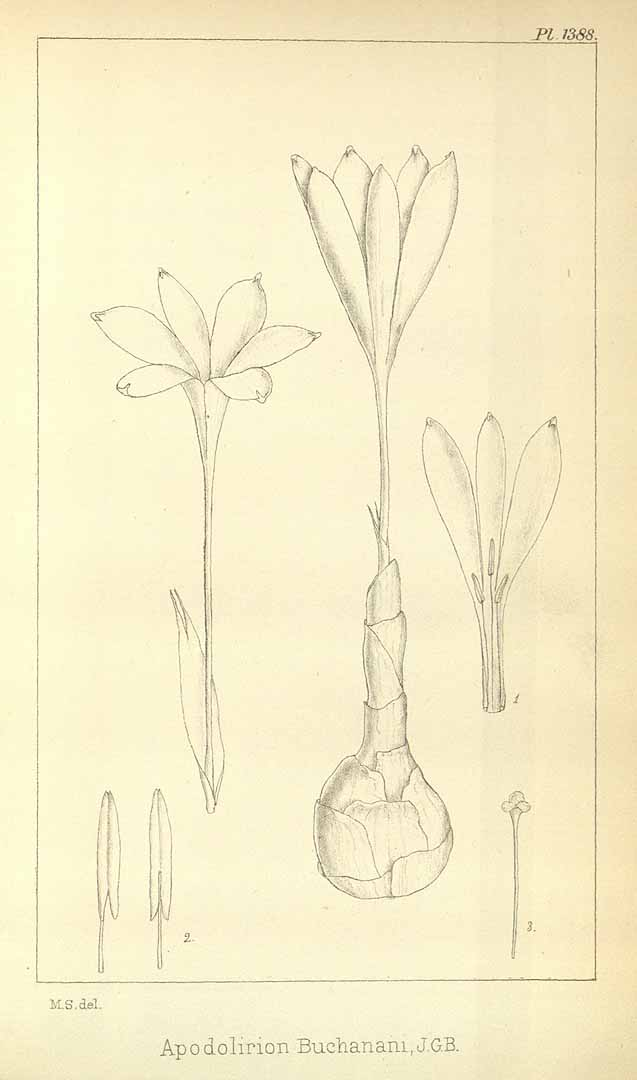
Apodolirion buchanii, from Hooker's Icones Plantarum (1882)

Gethyllis and Apodolirion are two unifloral genera with fused spathe bracts that retain the ovary inside the bulbs until the fruit matures. In both the scape remains inside the bulbs. The fruit is large, fleshy, and aromatic with many seeds, and distinct from the rest of Haemantheae which have berry fruits with only a few seeds. These seeds are also small and hard, while the rest of Haemantheae have seeds that are larger, fleshy and water rich.

The genera are also distinguished from each other by their stigmata. In Gethyllis this is capitate, while in Apodolirion it is trifid. Also, Apodolirion has six stamina while Gethyllis has many more, with some species having 18 or more.

== Taxonomy ==
For the early taxonomic history of these two genera, see Meerow and Clayton (2004). Gethyllis was one of the two Hamantheae genera to be described (Linnaeus 1753), and in 1829 Dumortier placed it in a monotypic higher taxon, tribe Gethyllideae, and hence is given as the authority, a practice followed by Salisbury. Baker described Apodolirion in 1878, noting the close resemblance to Gethyllis. Pax (1888) then placed both genera in his subtribe Zephyranthinae, as one of six genera, a practice followed by Hutchinson (1926), though at tribal rank.

Traub recognised the distinct features of these two genera, for which he created the tribe Gethylleae in his 1963 monograph on the Amaryllidaceae, based on the type genus Gethyllis. He (amongst others) even expressed the idea that they might be a single genus. On the other hand, Dahlgren (1985) submerged them once again in Haemantheae. Subsequently, the Müller-Doblies' restored Gethyllidinae as a tribe. Later molecular phylogenetic research has shown that these two genera, while forming a monophyletic subclade, is situated as one of three subtribes of Haemantheae, since forming a separate tribe renders Haemantheae paraphyletic. Although the two genera are resolved in this process as distinct sister groups, the possibility that they may eventually be considered a single genus remains.

=== Phylogeny ===
The Gethyllidinae are placed within the Haemantheae as follows:

- Tribe Haemantheae
  - Subtribe Cliviinae
  - - Subtribe Haemanthinae
    - Subtribe Gethyllidinae

=== Genera ===
- Apodolirion (~6 species)
- Gethyllis (~35 species)

== Distribution and habitat ==
Gethyllis is found in winter rainfall regions of southern Africa, while Apodolirion is found in the summer rainfall zone.

== Bibliography ==
- Hutchinson, John (1926). The families of flowering plants, arranged according to a new system based on their probable phylogeny. Volume 1: Monocotyledonae (1st ed.). Macmillan. Volume 2: Dicotyledonae 1934.
- Linnaeus, Carl (1753). Species Plantarum. Stockholm: Laurentii Salvii.
- Dahlgren, R.M.; Clifford, H.T.; Yeo, P.F. (1985). The families of the monocotyledons. Berlin: Springer-Verlag. ISBN 978-3-642-64903-5.
- Meerow, Alan W.; Clayton, Jason R. (1 February 2004). "Generic relationships among the baccate-fruited Amaryllidaceae (tribe Haemantheae) inferred from plastid and nuclear non-coding DNA sequences". Plant Systematics and Evolution. 244 (3–4): 141–155. Bibcode:2004PSyEv.244..141M. doi:10.1007/s00606-003-0085-z. S2CID 10245220.
- Meerow, Alan W.; Snijman, Deirdre A. (2006). "The never-ending story: multigene approaches to the phylogeny of Amaryllidaceae". Aliso. 22: 355–366. doi:10.5642/aliso.20062201.29.
- Vigneron, Pascal. "Amaryllidaceae". Amaryllidaceae.org (in French). Archived from the original on 4 January 2015.
- Traub, H.P. (1963). Genera of the Amaryllidaceae. La Jolla, California: American Plant Life Society. Archived from the original on 2018-10-01.
- Müller-Doblies, U.; Müller-Doblies, D. (1996). "Tribes and subtribes and some species combinations in Amaryllidaceae J St Hil R Dahlgren & al. 1985". Feddes Repertorium. 107 (5–6): S.c.1–S.c.9.
- Dumortier, Barthélemy-Charles (1829). Analyse des familles des plantes: avec l'indication des principaux genres qui s'y rattachent (in French). Tournay: Casterman.
- Salisbury, Richard Anthony; Gray, J. E. (1866). The Genera of Plants (Unpublished fragment). J. Van Voorst.
- Baker, JG (1878). "On two new genera of Amaryllidaceae from Cape Colony". Journal of Botany, British and Foreign. 16: 74–77.
- Pax, Ferdinand. "Amaryllidaceae". In Engler & Prantl (1888), pp. 97–124.
- Engler, Adolf; Prantl, Karl, eds. (1888). Die Natürlichen Pflanzenfamilien nebst ihren Gattungen und wichtigeren Arten, insbesondere den Nutzpflanzen, unter Mitwirkung zahlreicher hervorragender Fachgelehrten 1887–1915 II(5) (in German). Leipzig: W. Engelmann.
