= Cliviinae =

- Clivia nobilis

Scientific classification
- Kingdom: Plantae
- Clade: Tracheophytes
- Clade: Angiosperms
- Clade: Monocots
- Order: Asparagales
- Family: Amaryllidaceae
- Subfamily: Amaryllidoideae
- Tribe: Haemantheae
- Subtribe: Cliviinae; D. & U. M.-D.

Type genus
- Clivia Lindl.

Genera
- Clivia; Cryptostephanus

Synonyms
- Clivieae Traub

Subtribe of flowering plants

Cliviinae is a small subtribe of Haemantheae, and therefore within the African clades of Amaryllidoideae. It consists of two genera, Clivia, and Cryptostephanus.

== Description ==
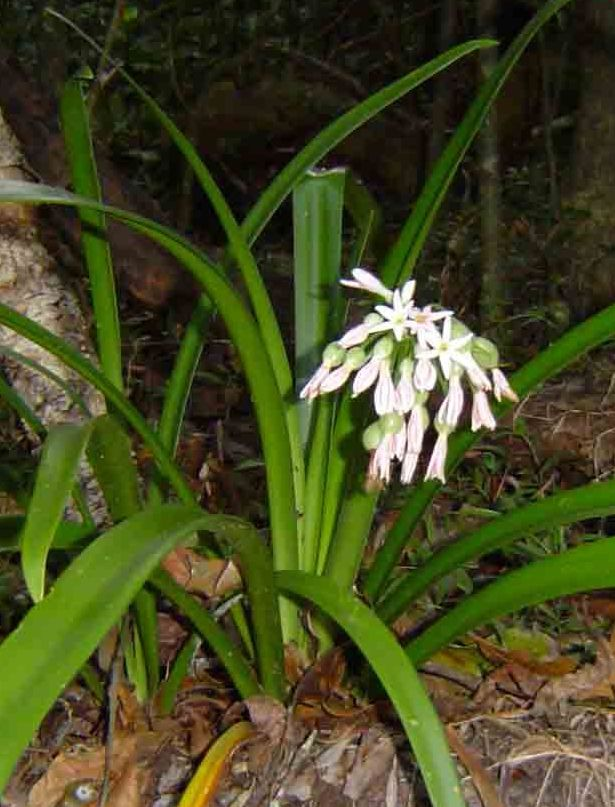
Cryptostephanus vansonii in Zimbabwe

Bulbless rhizomatous perennial plants. Clivia has showy orange or yellow flowers, while Cryptostephanus has smaller flowers with a paraperigone that had them erroneously classified with Narcissus in the past. it is also the only Haemantheae genus with a phytomelanous seed testa.

== Taxonomy ==
For the early taxonomic history of these two genera, see Meerow and Clayton (2004). (Traub described this grouping as tribe Clivieae in his 1963 monograph on the Amaryllidaceae, based on the type genus Clivia. . Subsequently, the Müller-Doblies' reduced it to a subtribe and placed it within the Haemantheae. Later molecular phylogenetic research has confirmed this placement, with Cliviinae being one of three subtribes of Haemantheae.

=== Phylogeny ===
The Cliviinae are placed within the Haemantheae as follows:

- Tribe Haemantheae
  - Subtribe Cliviinae
  - - Subtribe Haemanthinae
    - Subtribe Gethyllidinae

=== Subdivision ===
- Clivia (5 species)
- Cryptostephanus (2 species)

== Distribution and habitat ==
Clivia is found in summer rainfall regions, as herbaceous understory plants of coastal and Afro-montane forest, while Cryptostephanus are plants of savanna or forest habitats.

== Ecology ==
Butterfly and sunbird pollination.

== Bibliography ==
- Meerow, Alan W.; Clayton, Jason R. (1 February 2004). "Generic relationships among the baccate-fruited Amaryllidaceae (tribe Haemantheae) inferred from plastid and nuclear non-coding DNA sequences". Plant Systematics and Evolution. 244 (3–4): 141–155. Bibcode:2004PSyEv.244..141M. doi:10.1007/s00606-003-0085-z. S2CID 10245220.
- Meerow, Alan W.; Snijman, Deirdre A. (2006). "The never-ending story: multigene approaches to the phylogeny of Amaryllidaceae". Aliso. 22: 355–366. doi:10.5642/aliso.20062201.29.
- Vigneron, Pascal. "Amaryllidaceae". Amaryllidaceae.org (in French). Archived from the original on 4 January 2015.
- "Amaryllidaceae: A taxonomic tool for the Amaryllidaceae of the world". eMonocot. Archived from the original on 2016-03-04.
- Traub, H.P. (1963). Genera of the Amaryllidaceae. Genera of organisms. La Jolla, California: American Plant Life Society.
- Müller-Doblies, U.; Müller-Doblies, D. (1996). "Tribes and subtribes and some species combinations in Amaryllidaceae J St Hil R Dahlgren & al. 1985". Feddes Repertorium. 107 (5–6): S.c.1–S.c.9.
- Spies, P.; Grobler, J.P.; Spies, J.J. (2011). "A review of phylogenetic relationships in the genus Clivia". Philos. Trans. Genet. 1: 168–207.
- Conrad, Ferozah (February 2008). Molecular Systematics, Biogeography and Dating of the tribe Haemantheae (Amaryllidaceae) and the Phylogeography of Clivia (PhD Thesis). Department of Botany, University of Cape Town.
- Spies, Paula (December 2013). A comparison of the efficiency of DNA barcoding regions in a small and a large genus (PhD Thesis). Department of Genetics, University of the Free State.
