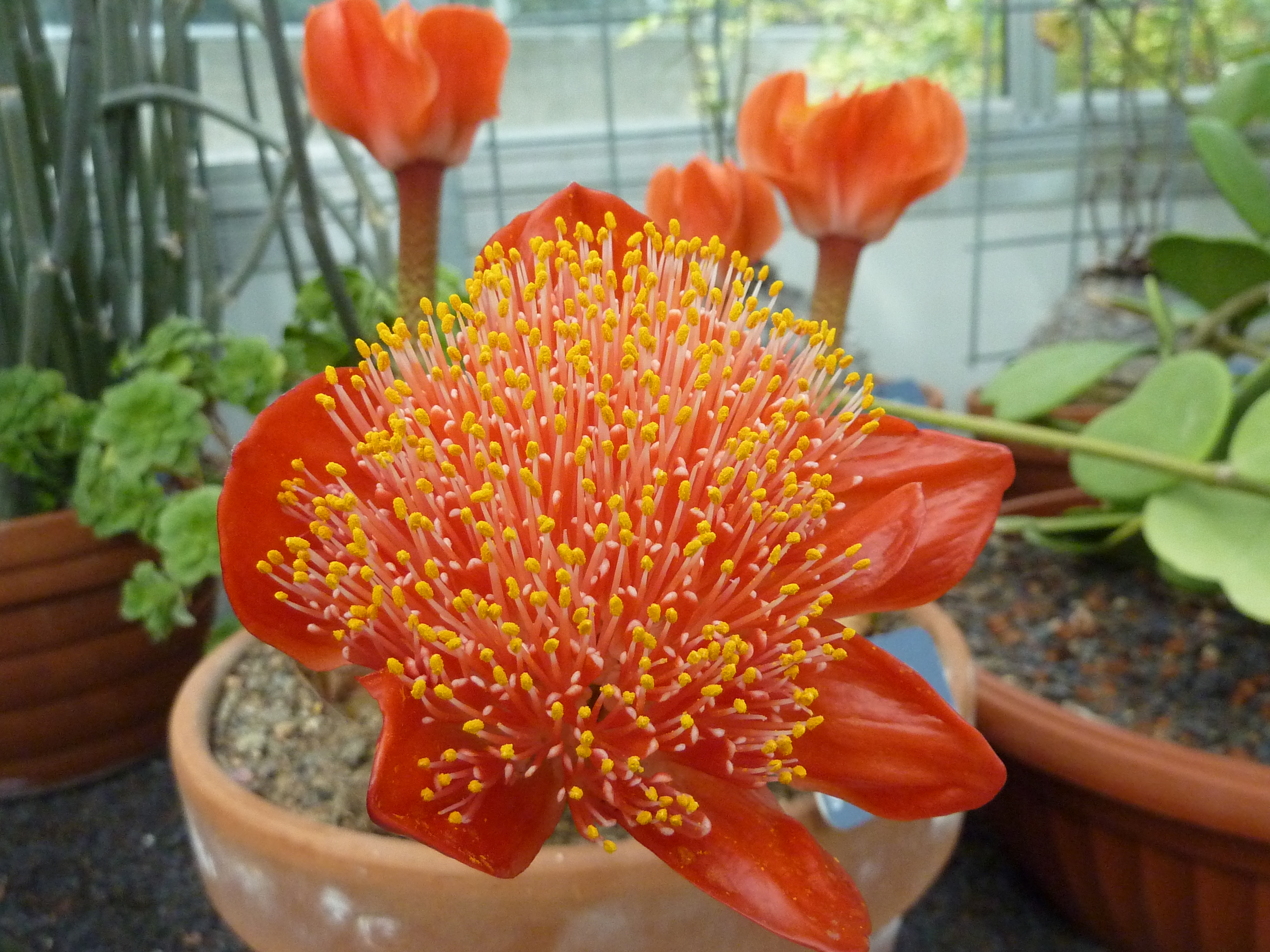
- Haemanthus coccineus

Scientific classification
- Kingdom: Plantae
- Clade: Tracheophytes
- Clade: Angiosperms
- Clade: Monocots
- Order: Asparagales
- Family: Amaryllidaceae
- Subfamily: Amaryllidoideae
- Tribe: Haemantheae
- Subtribe: Haemanthinae; Pax or Baker

Type genus
- Haemanthus L.

Genera
- Haemanthus; Scadoxus

Synonyms
- Haemanthineae (orth. var.)

= Haemanthinae =

Subtribe of flowering plants

Haemanthinae is a small subtribe of Haemantheae, and therefore within the African clades of Amaryllidoideae. It consists of two genera, Haemanthus, and Scadoxus.

== Description ==
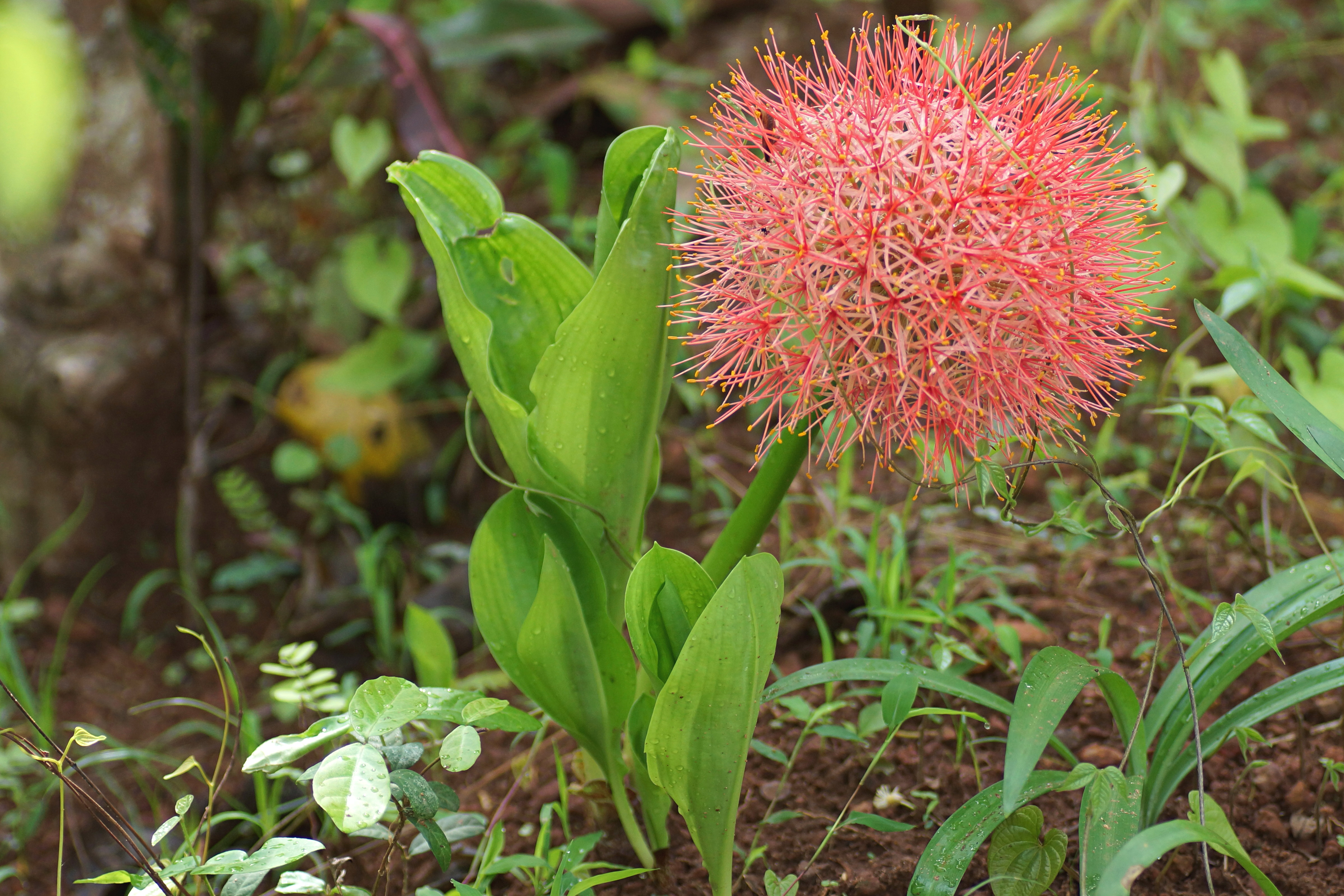
Scadoxus multiflorus

The genera of Haemanthinae share brush-like inflorescences, in which the bracts frequently form part of the pollinator attraction system. Not all Scadoxus form bulbs, while all species of Haemanthus do.

== Taxonomy ==
For the early taxonomic history of these two genera, see Meerow and Clayton (2004). Pax (1888) treated the Amaryllidaceae as four subfamilies, with two tribes in subfamily Amarylloideae, which consisted of two tribes, Amaryllideae and Narcisseae. The former contained six subtribes, placing Haemanthus together with Clivia in subtribe Haemanthinae. Hutchinson (1934) subsequently elevated this to tribe Haemantheae. Later, Traub placed Haemanthus with Choananthus (subsequently submerged in Scadoxus) in tribe Haemantheae in his 1963 monograph on the Amaryllidaceae. Later the Müller-Doblies' created a narrower concept of Haemantheae as a tribe with Haemanthinae as one of two subtribes and two genera, Haemanthus and Scadoxus. Molecular phylogenetic research has confirmed this placement, with Meerow and Clayton (2004) situating Haemanthinae (Note: They used the spelling "Haemanthineae" in this paper, which differs from earlier authors and is contrary to Article 19 of the International Code of Nomenclature for algae, fungi, and plants, which requires subtribe names to have the ending "-inae".) as one of three subtribes of Haemantheae.

=== Phylogeny ===
The Haemanthinae are placed within the Haemantheae as follows:

- Tribe Haemantheae
  - Subtribe Cliviinae
  - - Subtribe Haemanthinae
    - Subtribe Gethyllidinae

=== Subdivision ===
- Haemanthus (21 species)
- Scadoxus (9–12 species)

== Distribution and habitat ==
Scadoxus is a forest understory herbaceous genus, most commonly found in the tropical areas of Africa. Haemanthus on the other hand is confined to southern Africa, within the summer and winter rainfall regions of the Cape.

== Bibliography ==
- Hutchinson, John (1934). The families of flowering plants, arranged according to a new system based on their probable phylogeny. 2 vols (1 ed.). Macmillan. Volume 1: Monocotyledonae 1926, Volume 2:Dicotyledonae 1934.
- Meerow, Alan W.; Clayton, Jason R. (1 February 2004). "Generic relationships among the baccate-fruited Amaryllidaceae (tribe Haemantheae) inferred from plastid and nuclear non-coding DNA sequences". Plant Systematics and Evolution. 244 (3–4): 141–155. Bibcode:2004PSyEv.244..141M. doi:10.1007/s00606-003-0085-z. S2CID 10245220.
- Meerow, Alan W.; Snijman, Deirdre A. (2006). "The never-ending story: multigene approaches to the phylogeny of Amaryllidaceae". Aliso. 22: 355–366. doi:10.5642/aliso.20062201.29.
- Reveal, James L. (2012). "Indices Nominum Supragenericorum Plantarum Vascularium – H".
- Vigneron, Pascal. "Amaryllidaceae". Amaryllidaceae.org (in French). Archived from the original on 4 January 2015.
- "Amaryllidaceae: A taxonomic tool for the Amaryllidaceae of the world". eMonocot. Archived from the original on 4 March 2016.
- Traub, H.P. (1963). Genera of the Amaryllidaceae. Genera of organisms. La Jolla, California: American Plant Life Society.
- Müller-Doblies, U.; Müller-Doblies, D. (1996). "Tribes and subtribes and some species combinations in Amaryllidaceae J St Hil R Dahlgren & al. 1985". Feddes Repertorium. 107 (5–6): S.c.1–S.c.9.
- Pax, Ferdinand. Amaryllidaceae. pp. 97–124., in Engler & Prantl (1888)
- Engler, Adolf; Prantl, Karl, eds. (1888). Die Natürlichen Pflanzenfamilien nebst ihren Gattungen und wichtigeren Arten, insbesondere den Nutzpflanzen, unter Mitwirkung zahlreicher hervorragender Fachgelehrten 1887–1915 II(5) (in German). Leipzig: W. Engelmann.
- McNeill, J.; et al., eds. (2012). "Article 19". International Code of Nomenclature for algae, fungi, and plants (Melbourne Code), Adopted by the Eighteenth International Botanical Congress Melbourne, Australia, July 2011 (electronic ed.). Bratislava: International Association for Plant Taxonomy.
