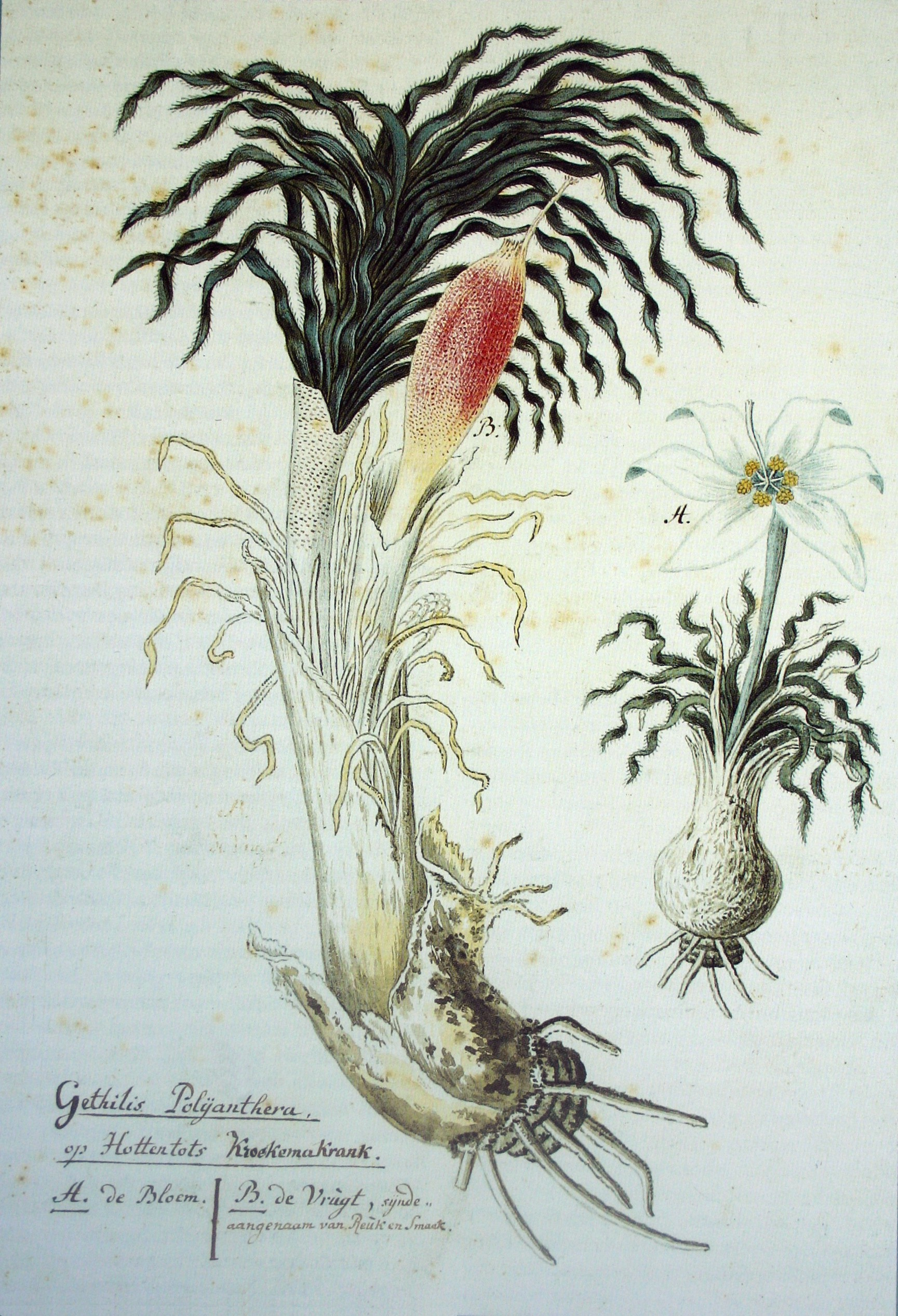
- Gethyllis ciliaris (Note: Painting by Dutch artist Robert Jacob Gordon. Patrick Cullinan. "Robert Jacob Gordon 1743-1795 The Man and his Travels at the Cape". Winchester Struik, Cape Town, 1992)

Scientific classification
- Kingdom: Plantae
- Clade: Embryophytes
- Clade: Tracheophytes
- Clade: Angiosperms
- Clade: Monocots
- Order: Asparagales
- Family: Amaryllidaceae
- Subfamily: Amaryllidoideae
- Tribe: Haemantheae
- Genus: Gethyllis; L.

Type species
- Gethyllis afra L.

Synonyms
- Abapus Adans.; Papiria Thunb.; Klingia Schönland

= Gethyllis =

Kukumakranka

Genus of flowering plants

Gethyllis (probably from Greek "gethyon", bulb), commonly called Kukumakranka, Koekemakranka, or Kroekemakrank, is a genus of bulbous plant in the amaryllid family with some 33 accepted species. It is native to the Cape Provinces, the Northern Provinces and the Free State of South Africa, as well as Botswana and Namibia.

== Description ==
The fragrant, solitary, white flower appears late December. Flowering is well-synchronised to increase the odds of cross-pollination, the genus being incapable of self-fertilisation. Triggering of mass flowering is thought to result from a sudden change in barometric pressure. Some three months later the edible, scented creamy-white to orange-yellow to rich burgundy-red, club-shaped fruit starts pushing above the soil surface. The inferior ovary is located well below ground-level where the developing fruit or berry is hidden until its growth forces it into view. Emergence of the fruit is followed almost immediately by the first leaves. The ripe fruit falls over and sheds its short-lived seeds, ready to take advantage of the winter rains. The genus is easily identified by its spirally twisted grey-green, strap-like leaves which develop during the winter months (May - August).

The ripe fruit is sometimes used to impart its special aroma to bottles of brandy.

== Taxonomy ==
This winter-growing genus is closely related to Apodolirion, which has 6 species found in both summer and winter regions, ranging from the Southern Cape to the summer-rainfall area of the Transvaal. The two genera together constitute the subtribe Gethyllidinae.

Species

- Gethyllis afra L. - Cape Provinces
- Gethyllis barbarae G.D.Duncan - Namibia
- Gethyllis barkerae D.Müller-Doblies - Cape Provinces
- Gethyllis britteniana Baker - Cape Provinces
- Gethyllis campanulata L.Bolus - Cape Provinces
- Gethyllis cavidens D.Müll.-Doblies - Cape Provinces
- Gethyllis ciliaris (Thunb.) Thunb. - Cape Provinces
- Gethyllis fimbriatula D.Müller-Doblies - Cape Provinces
- Gethyllis grandiflora L.Bolus - Cape Provinces
- Gethyllis gregoriana D.Müller-Doblies - Cape Provinces
- Gethyllis hallii D.Müller-Doblies - Cape Provinces
- Gethyllis heinzeana D.Müll.-Doblies - Cape Provinces
- Gethyllis kaapensis D.Müller-Doblies - Cape Provinces
- Gethyllis lanuginosa Marloth - Cape Provinces
- Gethyllis lata L.Bolus - Cape Provinces
- †Gethyllis latifolia Masson ex Baker - †Cape Provinces but extinct
- Gethyllis linearis L.Bolus - Cape Provinces
- Gethyllis longistyla Bolus - Cape Provinces
- Gethyllis marginata D.Müll.-Doblies - Cape Provinces
- Gethyllis namaquensis (Schönland) Oberm. - Namibia, Cape Provinces
- Gethyllis oligophylla D.Müll.-Doblies - Cape Provinces
- Gethyllis oliverorum D.Müll.-Doblies - Cape Provinces
- Gethyllis pectinata D.Müller-Doblies - Cape Provinces
- Gethyllis roggeveldensis D.Müller-Doblies - Cape Provinces
- Gethyllis setosa Marloth - Cape Provinces
- Gethyllis spiralis (Thunb.) Thunb. - Cape Provinces
- Gethyllis transkarooica D.Müller-Doblies - Botswana, Cape Provinces, Free State, Northern Provinces
- Gethyllis uteana D.Müller-Doblies - Cape Provinces
- Gethyllis verrucosa Marloth - Cape Provinces
- Gethyllis verticillata R.Br. ex Herb. - Cape Provinces
- Gethyllis villosa (Thunb.) Thunb. - Cape Provinces

Formerly included

A few names have been coined using the name Gethyllis, but referring to species now considered better suited to other genera (Apodolirion Curculigo Empodium). We here provide links to help you locate appropriate information

- Gethyllis acaulis - Curculigo orchioides
- Gethyllis lanceolata - Apodolirion lanceolatum
- Gethyllis pilosa - Curculigo pilosa
- Gethyllis plicata - Empodium plicatum

== Distribution and habitat ==
Gethyllis has an extensive distribution covering the winter-rainfall area of the southern portion of Namibia and throughout the Cape Provinces, with the Vanrhynsdorp-Nieuwoudtville region showing the greatest species diversity.

== Bibliography ==
- Linnaeus, Carl (1753). Species Plantarum. Stockholm: Laurentii Salvii.
