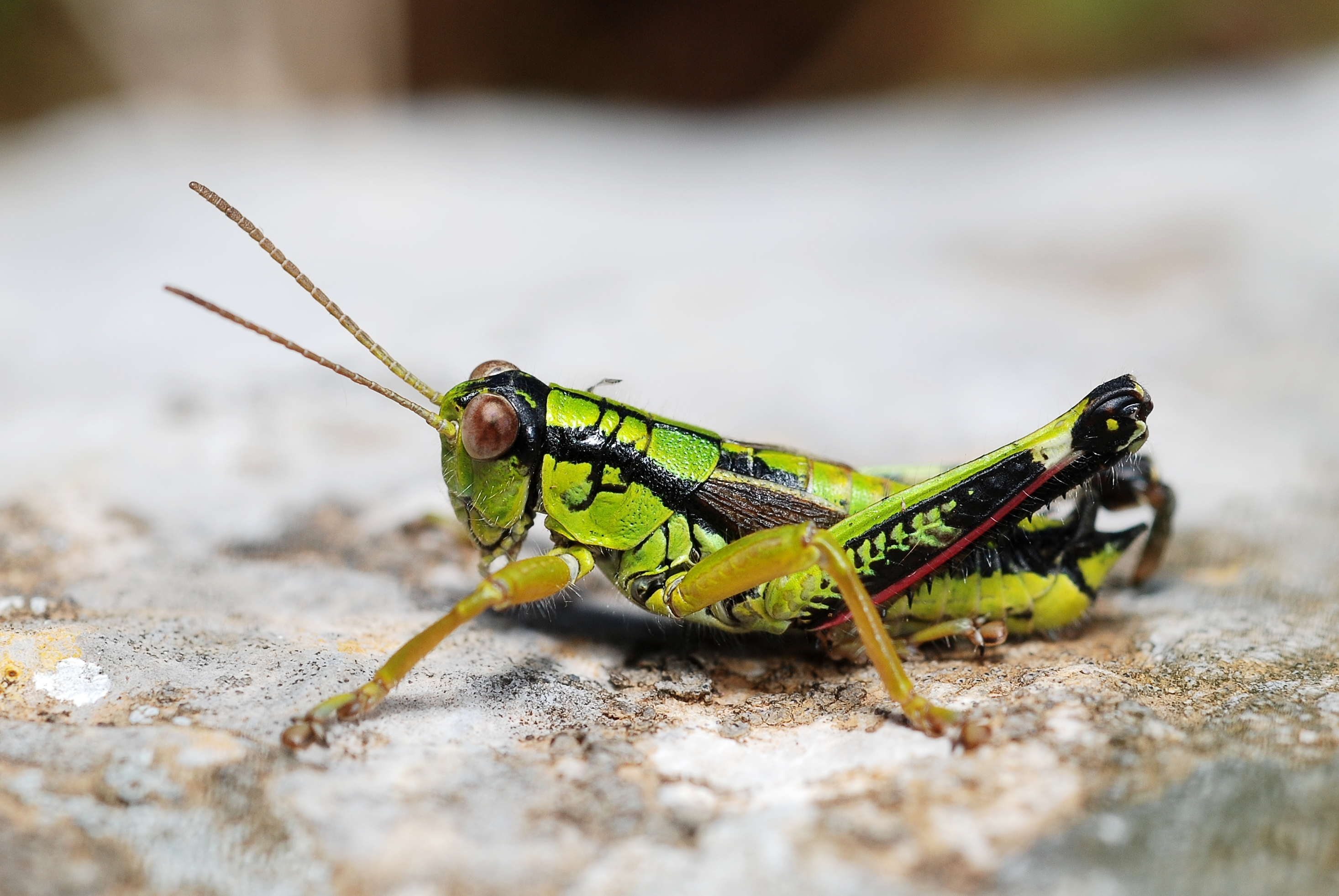
- Miramella alpina

Scientific classification
- Kingdom: Animalia
- Phylum: Arthropoda
- Clade: Pancrustacea
- Class: Insecta
- Order: Orthoptera
- Suborder: Caelifera
- Family: Acrididae
- Tribe: Podismini
- Subtribe: Miramellina
- Genus: Miramella; Dovnar-Zapolskij, 1932

Type species
- Podisma solitaria Ikonnikov, 1911

= Miramella =

Genus of grasshoppers

Miramella is a small genus of short-horned grasshoppers in the subfamily Melanoplinae. They are found in Europe and eastern Asia. As of January 2019, Orthoptera Species File lists seven species in three subgenera. The genus was first named in 1932. Miramella is the type genus of the subtribe Miramellina (Acrididae: Melanoplinae: Podismini).

Species in the genus Mirabella occur in a variety of habitats, with some found at up to 2,800 m (9,200 ft) above sea level in the Swiss alps, including alpine, subalpine, montane, and submontane meadows. The conservation status of three species have been assessed on the IUCN Red List—Miramella carinthiaca, M. irena, and M. alpina. They are each listed as species of "least concern".

== Subgenera and species ==
Subgenera and species include:

- Subgenus Galvagniella Harz, 1973 (southeastern Europe)
  - Miramella albanica Mistshenko, 1952 – Balkan Mountain grasshopper
  - Miramella demissa Mulder, 2023
- Subgenus Kisella Harz, 1973 (western and central Europe)
  - Miramella alpina (Kollar, 1833) – green mountain grasshopper
  - Miramella carinthiaca (Obenberger, 1926) – Karinthian Mountain grasshopper (southeastern Alps)
  - Miramella irena (Fruhstorfer, 1921) – long-winged mountain grasshopper (southeastern Alps)
- Subgenus Miramella Dovnar-Zapolskij, 1932 (eastern Asia)
  - Miramella changbaishanensis Gong, J., Z. Zheng & Lian, 1995
  - Miramella rufipenne Chang, K.S.F., 1940
  - Miramella solitaria (Ikonnikov, 1911), type species of the genus, as Podisma solitaria (Korea, far east Russia, northeastern China)

Genera with species formerly considered part of Mirabella include Capraiuscola, Nadigella, Parapodisma, Podisma, and Sinopodisma.
