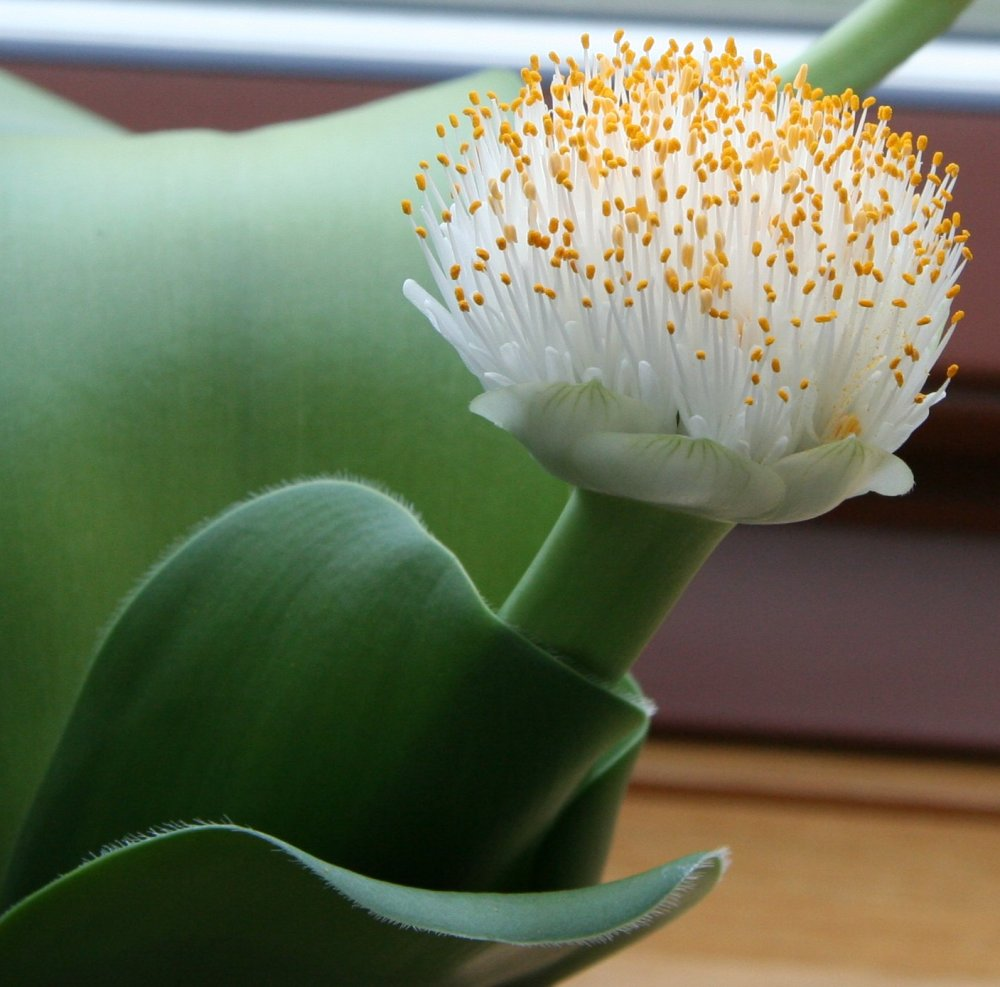
- Haemanthus albiflos

Scientific classification
- Kingdom: Plantae
- Clade: Tracheophytes
- Clade: Angiosperms
- Clade: Monocots
- Order: Asparagales
- Family: Amaryllidaceae
- Subfamily: Amaryllidoideae
- Tribe: Haemantheae; Hutch.

Type genus
- Haemanthus L.

Subtribes
- Cliviinae; Haemanthinae; Gethyllidinae

= Haemantheae =

Tribe of flowering plants

Haemantheae are a tribe of subfamily Amaryllidoideae (family Amaryllidaceae). They are herbaceous monocot perennial flowering plants with a predominantly African distribution. Three subtribes are proposed and six genera including the type genus, Haemanthus, are included. They are characterised by the presence of baccate (berry) fruit.

== Taxonomy ==
=== Phylogeny ===
The placement of Haemantheae within subfamily Amaryllidoideae is shown in the following cladogram:

Cladogram: Tribes of subfamily Amaryllidoideae

- Subfamily Amaryllidoideae
  - Africa
    Tribe Amaryllideae
  - - - Africa
        Tribe Cyrtantheae
      - - Africa
          Tribe Haemantheae
        - Australasia
          Tribe Calostemmateae
    - - Eurasian clade
        - Asia
          Tribe Lycorideae
        - Mediterranean
          - Tribe Galantheae
          - - Tribe Pancratieae
            - Tribe Narcisseae
      - American clade
        - Hippeastroid clade
          - Tribe Griffineae
          - Tribe Hippeastreae
        - Andean clade
          - - Tribe Eustephieae
          - - Tribe Eucharideae/Stenomesseae
            - - - Tribe Clinantheae
                - Tribe Hymenocallideae

=== Subdivision ===
There are three subtribes, with six genera

- Cliviinae D.Müll.-Doblies & U.Müll.-Doblies
- Haemanthinae Pax
- Gethyllidinae Meerow

The subtribes are related as follows:

- Tribe Haemantheae
  - Subtribe Cliviinae
  - - Subtribe Haemanthinae
    - Subtribe Gethyllidinae

Cliviinae: Two genera - Clivia, Cryptostephanus

Haemanthinae: Type - two genera, Haemanthus, Scadoxus

Gethyllidinae: Two genera - Apodolirion, Gethyllis

== Bibliography ==
- Meerow, Alan W.; Clayton, Jason R. (1 February 2004). "Generic relationships among the baccate-fruited Amaryllidaceae (tribe Haemantheae) inferred from plastid and nuclear non-coding DNA sequences". Plant Systematics and Evolution. 244 (3–4): 141–155. Bibcode:2004PSyEv.244..141M. doi:10.1007/s00606-003-0085-z. S2CID 10245220.
- Meerow, Alan W.; Snijman, Deirdre A. (2006). "The never-ending story: multigene approaches to the phylogeny of Amaryllidaceae". Aliso. 22: 355–366. doi:10.5642/aliso.20062201.29.
- Vigneron, Pascal. "Amaryllidaceae". Amaryllidaceae.org (in French). Archived from the original on 4 January 2015.
- "Amaryllidaceae: A taxonomic tool for the Amaryllidaceae of the world". eMonocot. Archived from the original on 2016-03-04.
- Spies, P.; Grobler, J.P.; Spies, J.J. (2011). "A review of phylogenetic relationships in the genus Clivia". Philos. Trans. Genet. 1: 168–207.
- Conrad, Ferozah (February 2008). Molecular Systematics, Biogeography and Dating of the tribe Haemantheae (Amaryllidaceae) and the Phylogeography of Clivia (PhD Thesis). Department of Botany, University of Cape Town.
