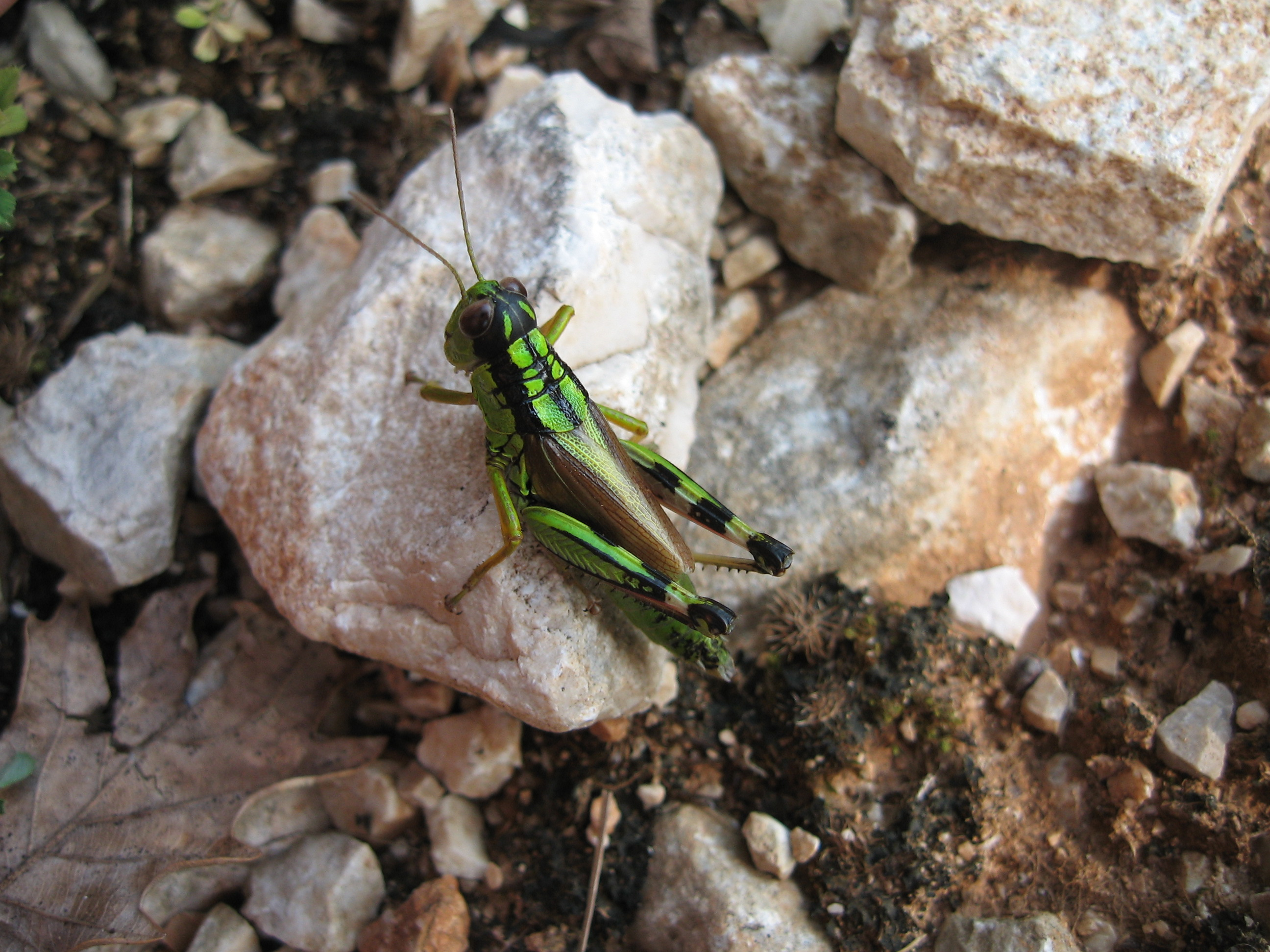

Conservation status
- Least Concern (IUCN 3.1)

Scientific classification
- Kingdom: Animalia
- Phylum: Arthropoda
- Clade: Pancrustacea
- Class: Insecta
- Order: Orthoptera
- Suborder: Caelifera
- Family: Acrididae
- Subfamily: Melanoplinae
- Tribe: Podismini
- Subtribe: Miramellina
- Genus: Miramella
- Species: M. irena

Binomial name
- Miramella irena (Fruhstorfer, 1921)

= Miramella irena =

Species of grasshopper

Miramella irena is a species of insect in family Acrididae. It is found in Hungary and Romania.
