= Gethyllis latifolia =

Scientific classification
- Kingdom: Plantae
- Clade: Tracheophytes
- Clade: Angiosperms
- Clade: Monocots
- Order: Asparagales
- Family: Amaryllidaceae
- Subfamily: Amaryllidoideae
- Genus: Gethyllis
- Species: G. latifolia

Binomial name
- Gethyllis latifolia Masson ex Baker

Species of plant

Gethyllis latifolia is a perennial geophyte belonging to the genus Gethyllis. The species is endemic to the Western Cape and there are only four plants in one population in the hills between Bitterfontein and Nuwerus.
