= Apodolirion cedarbergense =

Scientific classification
- Kingdom: Plantae
- Clade: Tracheophytes
- Clade: Angiosperms
- Clade: Monocots
- Order: Asparagales
- Family: Amaryllidaceae
- Subfamily: Amaryllidoideae
- Genus: Apodolirion
- Species: A. cedarbergense

Binomial name
- Apodolirion cedarbergense D.Müll.-Doblies

Species of flowering plant

Apodolirion cedarbergense is a geophyte belonging to the Amaryllidaceae family. The species is endemic to the Western Cape, occurring in the northern Cederberg and is part of the Cederberg fynbos. The plant is considered rare.
