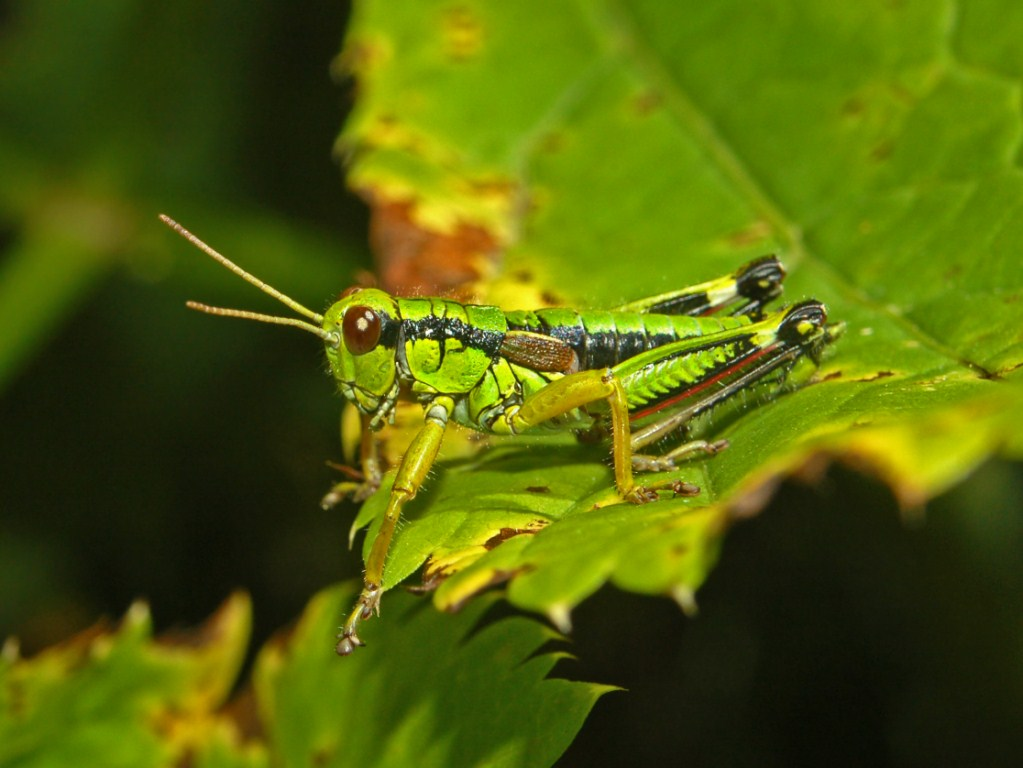
- Male

Scientific classification
- Kingdom: Animalia
- Phylum: Arthropoda
- Clade: Pancrustacea
- Class: Insecta
- Order: Orthoptera
- Suborder: Caelifera
- Family: Acrididae
- Subfamily: Melanoplinae
- Tribe: Podismini
- Subtribe: Miramellina
- Genus: Miramella
- Species: M. alpina

Binomial name
- Miramella alpina (Kollar, 1833)

Synonyms
- Kisella alpina (Kollar, 1833)

= Miramella alpina =

Species of grasshopper

Miramella alpina, commonly known as the green mountain grasshopper, is a species of short-horned grasshopper in the family Acrididae.

== Subspecies ==
- Miramella alpina var. alpina (Kollar, 1833)
- Miramella alpina var. subalpina (Fischer, 1850)
- Miramella alpina var. albanica Mishchenko, L.L., 1952 - Galvagniella albanica Mishchenko, L.L., 1952
- Miramella alpina var. collina (Brunner von Wattenwyl, 1864) - Miramella alpina var. alpina (Kollar, 1833)

== Distribution ==
This common alpine grasshopper is present in Austria, Belgium, Czech Republic, France, Germany, Italy, Poland, Spain and Switzerland.

== Description ==
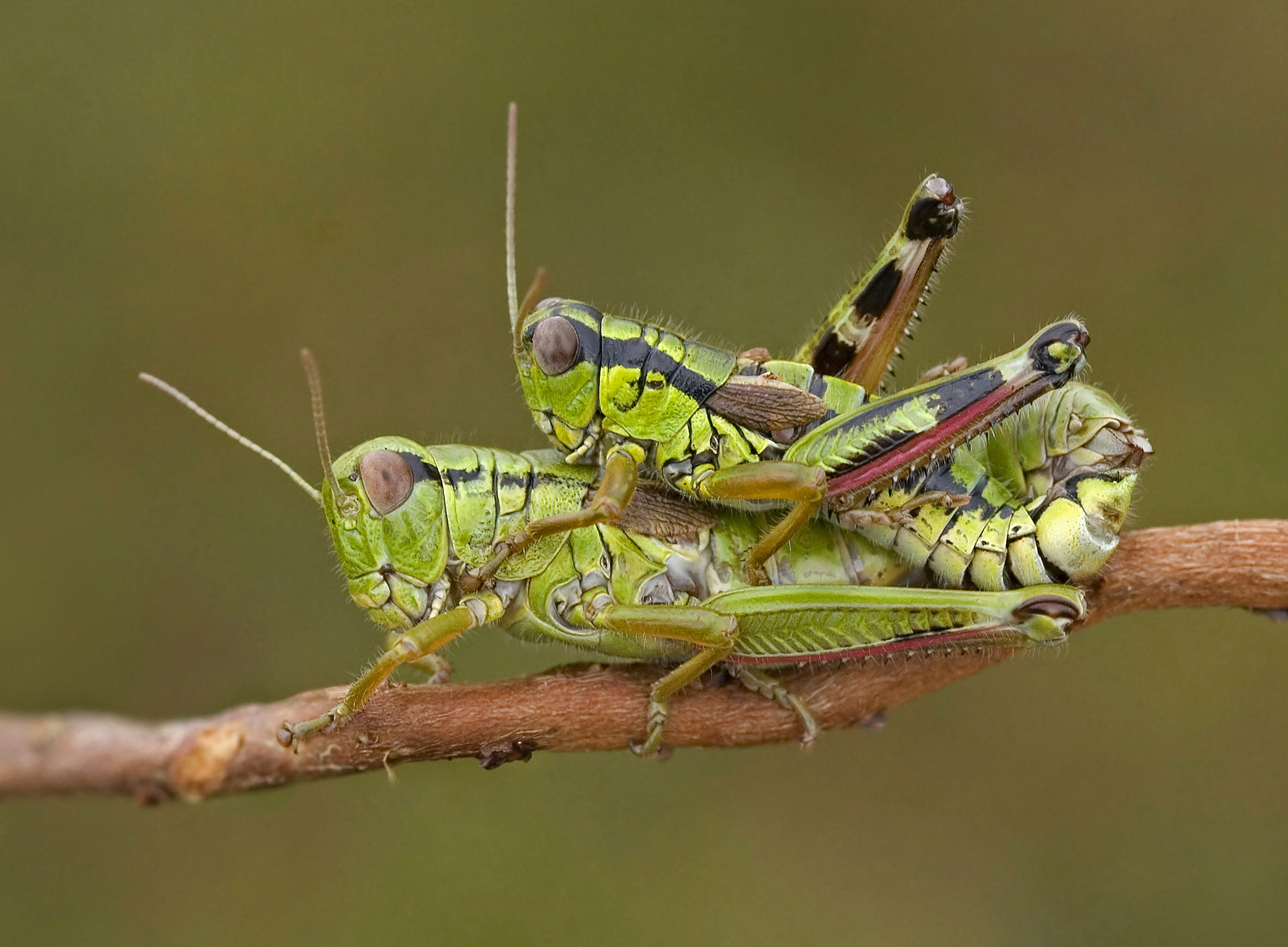
Miramella alpina, mating pair

The adult males grow up to 16–23 millimetres (0.63–0.91 in) long, while the females reach 22–30 millimetres (0.87–1.18 in)of length. The basic coloration of the body is bright green in both sexes, with longitudinal black stripes at the sides of pronotum, extended to the abdomen in males. The light-brown wings usually are very reduced and unfit to flight (brachyptery). Femora of the hind legs are red on the bottom, while tibiae are yellowish in the females and black in males.

== Biology and behavior ==
They can be encountered from late June through September, mainly in moist mountain meadows, wet clearings and open woods. They feed on grasses, lichens, mosses and various herbaceous plants, with a preference for Vaccinium species.
