= Gethyllis pectinata =

Scientific classification
- Kingdom: Plantae
- Clade: Tracheophytes
- Clade: Angiosperms
- Clade: Monocots
- Order: Asparagales
- Family: Amaryllidaceae
- Subfamily: Amaryllidoideae
- Genus: Gethyllis
- Species: G. pectinata

Binomial name
- Gethyllis pectinata D.Müll.-Doblies

Species of plant

Gethyllis pectinata is a perennial geophyte belonging to the genus Gethyllis and is part of the Hantam Karoo. The species is endemic to the Northern Cape and occurs from Nieuwoudtville to Calvinia. There is only one population that is threatened by overgrazing and illegal collection of the plant.
