= Gethyllis campanulata =

Scientific classification
- Kingdom: Plantae
- Clade: Tracheophytes
- Clade: Angiosperms
- Clade: Monocots
- Order: Asparagales
- Family: Amaryllidaceae
- Subfamily: Amaryllidoideae
- Genus: Gethyllis
- Species: G. campanulata

Binomial name
- Gethyllis campanulata L.Bolus

Synonyms
- Gethyllis multifolia L.Bolus

Species of plant

Gethyllis campanulata is a perennial geophyte belonging to the genus Gethyllis and is part of the fynbos and the Succulent Karoo. The species is endemic to the Northern Cape and the Western Cape. It occurs from Nieuwoudtville and the Roggeveld Mountains to Worcester and Touws River.
