= Gethyllis gregoriana =

Scientific classification
- Kingdom: Plantae
- Clade: Tracheophytes
- Clade: Angiosperms
- Clade: Monocots
- Order: Asparagales
- Family: Amaryllidaceae
- Subfamily: Amaryllidoideae
- Genus: Gethyllis
- Species: G. gregoriana

Binomial name
- Gethyllis gregoriana D.Müll.-Doblies

Species of plant

Gethyllis gregoriana is a perennial geophyte belonging to the genus Gethyllis and is part of the fynbos and Succulent Karoo. The species is endemic to the Northern Cape and the Western Cape. It occurs from Nieuwoudtville to the Biedouw Valley. The plant has a range of 4 000 km^{2} and there are thirteen subpopulations. Each subpopulation consists of only a few individual plants, the plant is considered rare.
