= Gethyllis hallii =

Scientific classification
- Kingdom: Plantae
- Clade: Tracheophytes
- Clade: Angiosperms
- Clade: Monocots
- Order: Asparagales
- Family: Amaryllidaceae
- Subfamily: Amaryllidoideae
- Genus: Gethyllis
- Species: G. hallii

Binomial name
- Gethyllis hallii D.Müll.-Doblies

Species of plant

Gethyllis hallii is a perennial geophyte belonging to the genus Gethyllis and is part of the Succulent Karoo. The species is endemic to the Northern Cape and the Western Cape. It occurs in Namaqualand, from Koingnaas to Vredendal, and is considered rare.
