= Capraiuscola =

Scientific classification
- Kingdom: Animalia
- Phylum: Arthropoda
- Clade: Pancrustacea
- Class: Insecta
- Order: Orthoptera
- Suborder: Caelifera
- Family: Acrididae
- Subfamily: Melanoplinae
- Tribe: Podismini
- Genus: Capraiuscola; Galvagni, 1986

Genus of grasshoppers

External image
- Images at iNaturalist

Capraiuscola is a monotypic genus of Palaearctic grasshoppers in the tribe Podismini and subtribe Miramellina, erected by A. Galvagni in 1986. The recorded distribution for this grasshopper (possibly incomplete) is in eastern Europe: from Romania up to Poland.

== Subspecies ==
The Orthoptera Species File includes the single species Capraiuscola ebneri (Galvagni, 1953) and lists the subspecies:

1. Capraiuscola ebneri carpathica (Cejchan, 1958)
2. Capraiuscola ebneri ebneri (Galvagni, 1953), the "Eastern Mountain Grasshopper", is the type species (originally as Miramella ebneri Galvagni): originally found in Bolboci-Sinaia, Romania.
