= Gethyllis longistyla =

Scientific classification
- Kingdom: Plantae
- Clade: Tracheophytes
- Clade: Angiosperms
- Clade: Monocots
- Order: Asparagales
- Family: Amaryllidaceae
- Subfamily: Amaryllidoideae
- Genus: Gethyllis
- Species: G. longistyla

Binomial name
- Gethyllis longistyla Bolus

Species of plant

Gethyllis longistyla is a perennial geophyte belonging to the genus Gethyllis and is part of the Nama Karoo. The species is endemic to the Northern Cape and the Western Cape and occurs on the Sneeuberg, Agter-Sneeuberg and Nuweveldberge.

The plant is considered rare. There is currently no threat to the species, but it may be affected by shale gas exploitation in the future.
