= Gethyllis lata =

Scientific classification
- Kingdom: Plantae
- Clade: Tracheophytes
- Clade: Angiosperms
- Clade: Monocots
- Order: Asparagales
- Family: Amaryllidaceae
- Subfamily: Amaryllidoideae
- Genus: Gethyllis
- Species: G. lata

Binomial name
- Gethyllis lata L.Bolus

Species of plant

Gethyllis lata is a perennial geophyte belonging to the genus Gethyllis and is part of the fynbos and Succulent Karoo. The species is endemic to the Northern Cape and the Western Cape and occurs from the Knersvlakte to Nieuwoudtville. The plant is considered rare.

The plant has two subspecies:

- Gethyllis lata subsp. lata
- Gethyllis lata subsp. orbicularis D.Müll.-Doblies
