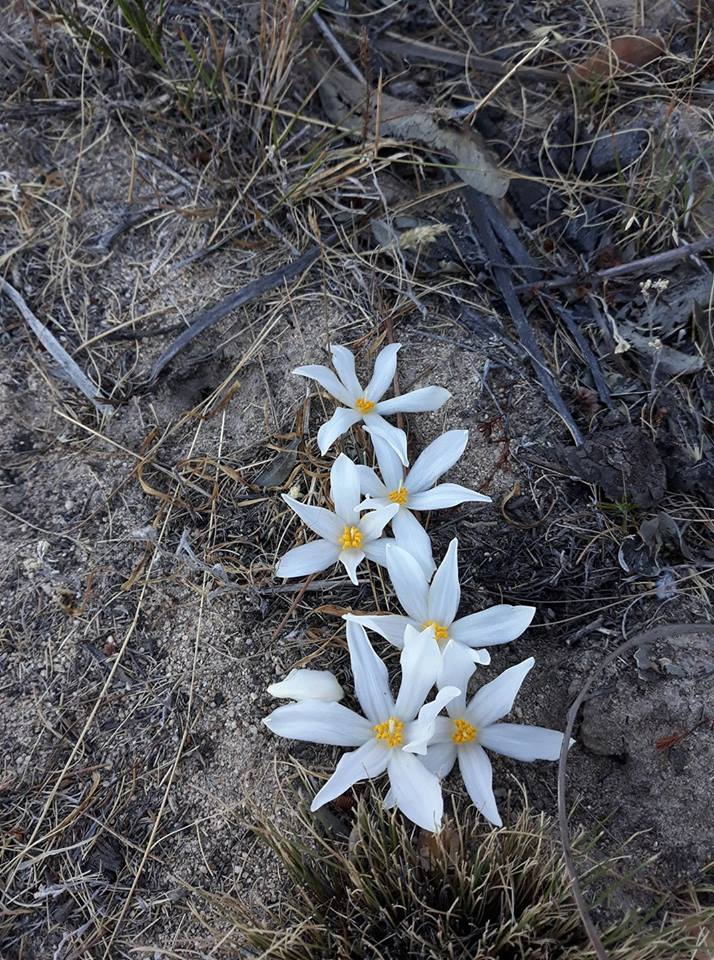

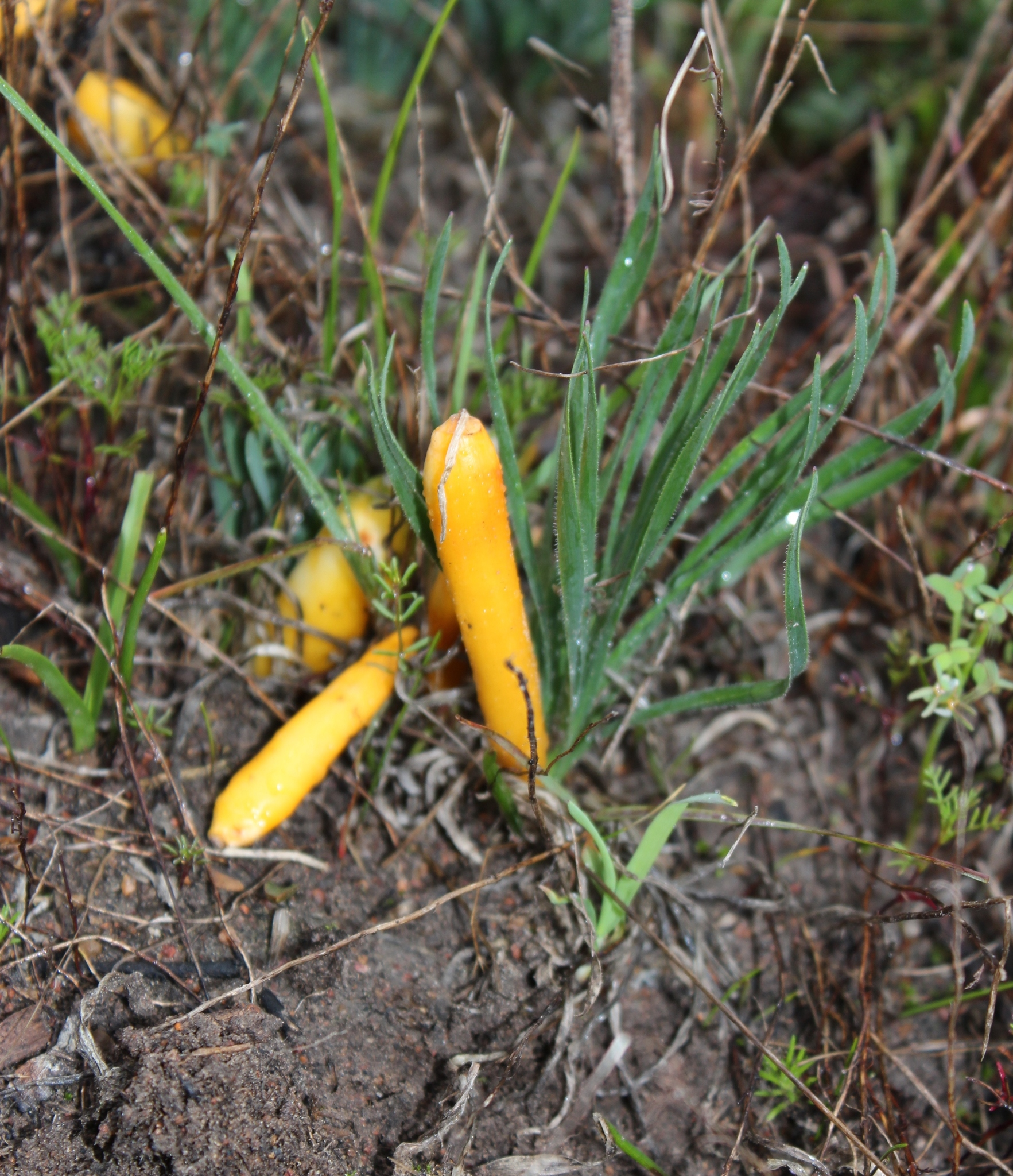

Scientific classification
- Kingdom: Plantae
- Clade: Tracheophytes
- Clade: Angiosperms
- Clade: Monocots
- Order: Asparagales
- Family: Amaryllidaceae
- Subfamily: Amaryllidoideae
- Genus: Gethyllis
- Species: G. afra

Binomial name
- Gethyllis afra L.

Synonyms
- Gethyllis pusilla Baker

= Gethyllis afra =

Species of plant

Gethyllis afra, commonly known as the many-leaved Cape crocus, kukumakranka, bramakranka or koekoemakranka, is a perennial geophyte belonging to the genus Gethyllis. The species is endemic to the Western Cape.
