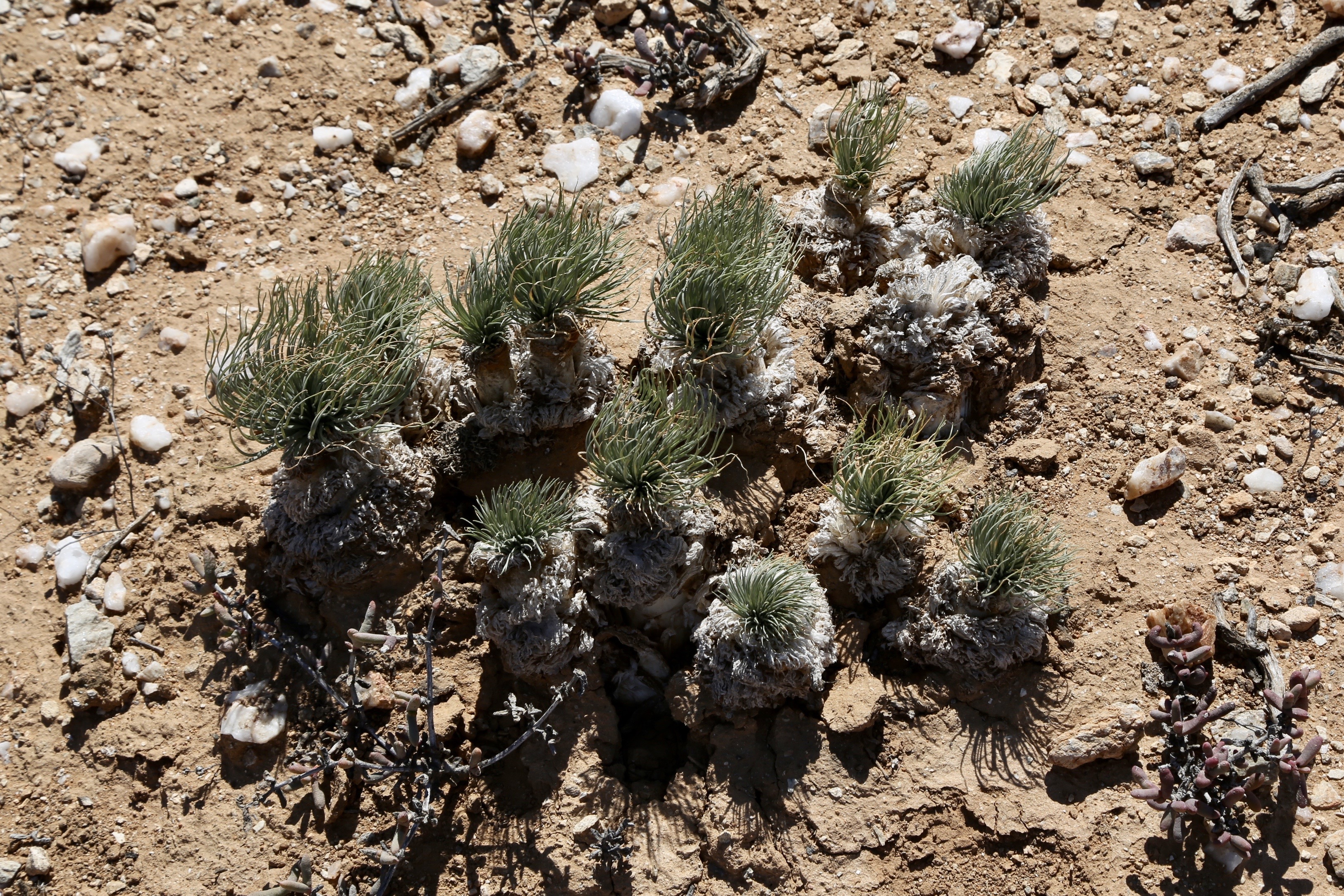

Scientific classification
- Kingdom: Plantae
- Clade: Embryophytes
- Clade: Tracheophytes
- Clade: Angiosperms
- Clade: Monocots
- Order: Asparagales
- Family: Amaryllidaceae
- Subfamily: Amaryllidoideae
- Genus: Gethyllis
- Species: G. namaquensis

Binomial name
- Gethyllis namaquensis (Schönland) Oberm.

Synonyms
- Gethyllis angelicae Dinter & G.M.Schulze; Klingia namaquensis Schönland

= Gethyllis namaquensis =

Species of plant

Gethyllis namaquensis, commonly known as the Namaqua kukumakranka, is a perennial geophyte belonging to the genus Gethyllis. The species is native to the Northern Cape and Namibia where it occurs in the Richtersveld and southern Namibia. The fruit of the plant is eaten and used as medicine.
