= Miramella demissa =

Scientific classification
- Kingdom: Animalia
- Phylum: Arthropoda
- Clade: Pancrustacea
- Class: Insecta
- Order: Orthoptera
- Suborder: Caelifera
- Family: Acrididae
- Tribe: Podismini
- Genus: Miramella
- Species: M. demissa

Binomial name
- Miramella demissa (Mulder, 2023)
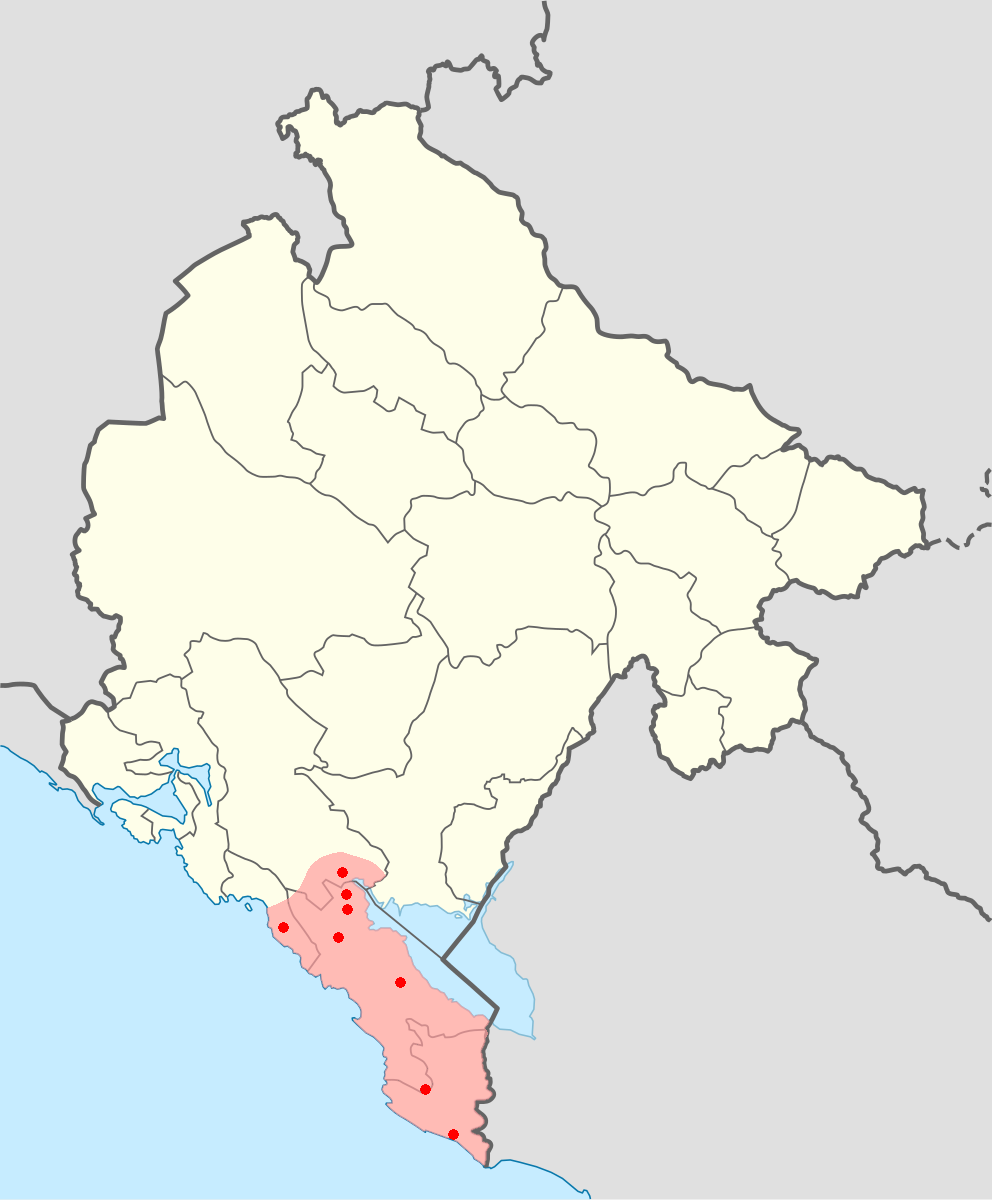

Species of grasshopper

Miramella demissa is a species of insect in family Acrididae. It is found in Montenegro.

== Distribution ==
Miramella demissa is endemic to southeast of Montenegro, specifically the Ulcinj, Bar, Budva and Cetinje municipalities.
