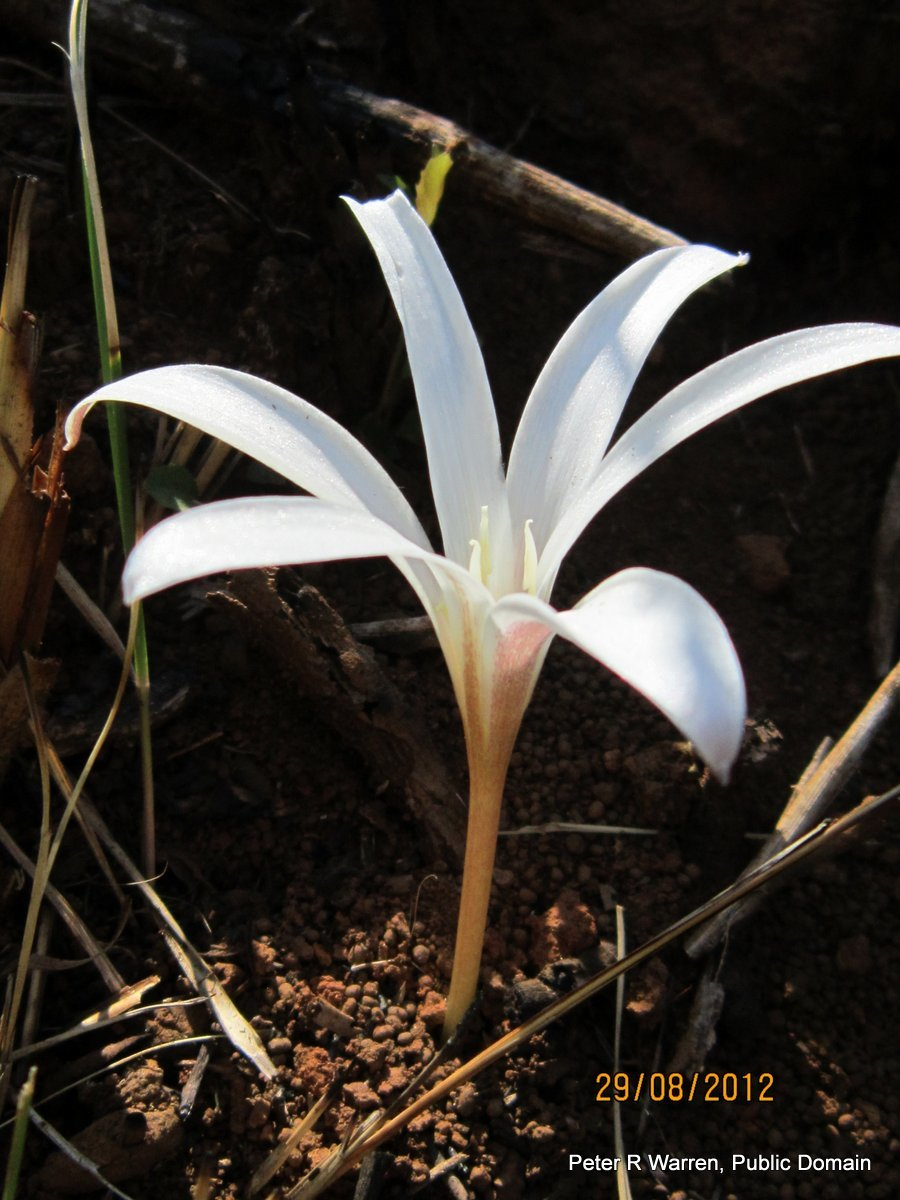

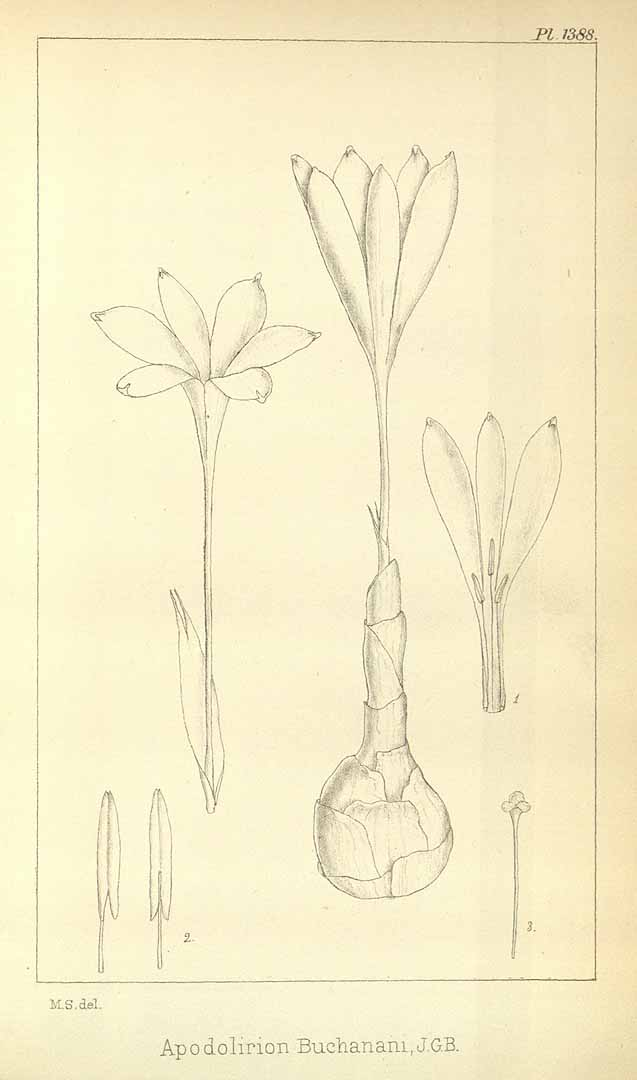

Scientific classification
- Kingdom: Plantae
- Clade: Tracheophytes
- Clade: Angiosperms
- Clade: Monocots
- Order: Asparagales
- Family: Amaryllidaceae
- Subfamily: Amaryllidoideae
- Genus: Apodolirion
- Species: A. buchananii

Binomial name
- Apodolirion buchananii (Baker)

Synonyms
- Apodolirion ettae Baker; Apodolirion mackenii Baker; Cyphonema buchananii Baker

= Apodolirion buchananii =

Species of flowering plant

Apodolirion buchananii, commonly known as the Natal crocus and the yellow-bell, is a geophyte belonging to the Amaryllidaceae family. The species is native to KwaZulu-Natal, Mpumalanga, the Eastern Cape, the Free State, Eswatini and Lesotho.
