= Gethyllis roggeveldensis =

Scientific classification
- Kingdom: Plantae
- Clade: Tracheophytes
- Clade: Angiosperms
- Clade: Monocots
- Order: Asparagales
- Family: Amaryllidaceae
- Subfamily: Amaryllidoideae
- Genus: Gethyllis
- Species: G. roggeveldensis

Binomial name
- Gethyllis roggeveldensis D.Müll.-Doblies

Species of plant

Gethyllis roggeveldensis is a perennial geophyte belonging to the genus Gethyllis and is part of the fynbos and Succulent Karoo. The species is endemic to the Northern Cape and Western Cape and occurs from Calvinia to the Roggeveld Mountains and Matjiesfontein.
