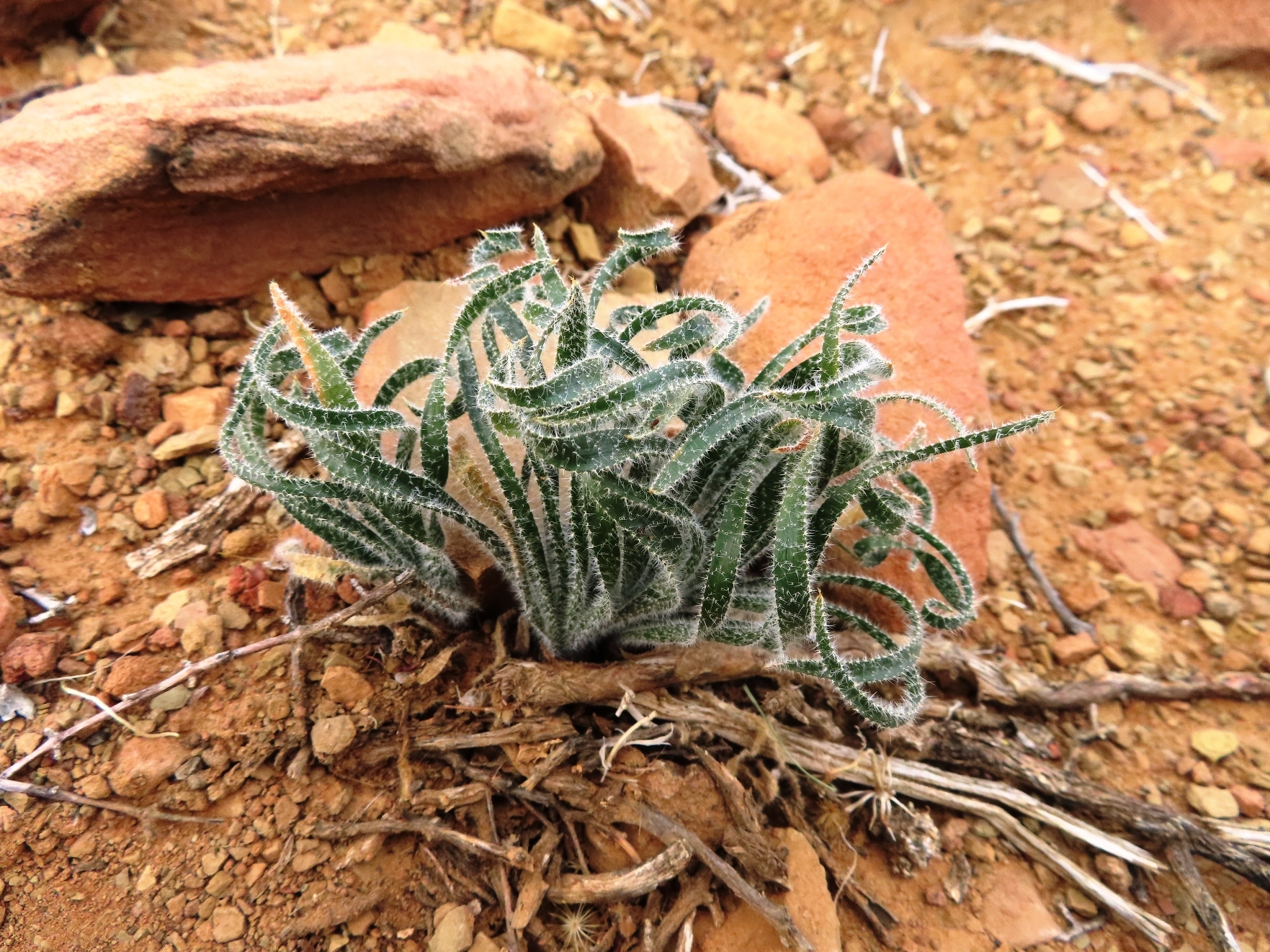

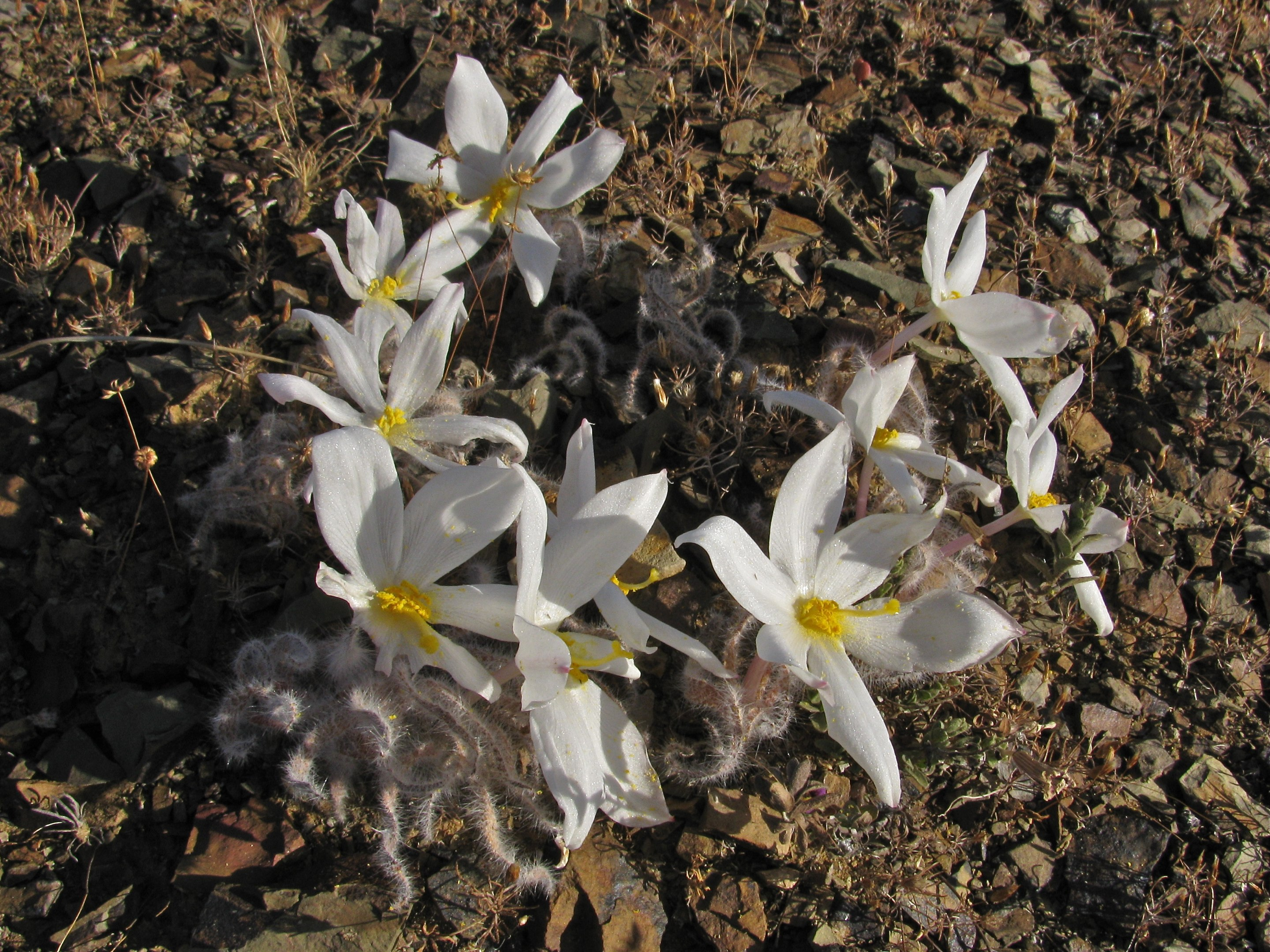

Scientific classification
- Kingdom: Plantae
- Clade: Tracheophytes
- Clade: Angiosperms
- Clade: Monocots
- Order: Asparagales
- Family: Amaryllidaceae
- Subfamily: Amaryllidoideae
- Genus: Gethyllis
- Species: G. villosa

Binomial name
- Gethyllis villosa (Thunb.) Thunb.

Synonyms
- Papiria villosa Thunb.

= Gethyllis villosa =

Species of plant

Gethyllis villosa, commonly known as the hairy kukumakranka, is a perennial geophyte belonging to the genus Gethyllis. The species is endemic to the Northern Cape and the Western Cape.
