= Gethyllis kaapensis =

Scientific classification
- Kingdom: Plantae
- Clade: Tracheophytes
- Clade: Angiosperms
- Clade: Monocots
- Order: Asparagales
- Family: Amaryllidaceae
- Subfamily: Amaryllidoideae
- Genus: Gethyllis
- Species: G. kaapensis

Binomial name
- Gethyllis kaapensis D.Müll.-Doblies

Species of plant

Gethyllis kaapensis, commonly known as the peninsula kukumakranka, is a perennial geophyte belonging to the genus Gethyllis and is part of the fynbos. The species is endemic to the Western Cape and occurs in the Cape Peninsula. There used to be three subpopulations but two have been lost to urban development. The remaining subpopulation falls under the protection of the Table Mountain National Park and consists of less than 250 plants.
