= Plants of the World Online =

Online taxonomic plant database

- Available in: English
- Owner: Royal Botanic Gardens, Kew
- Website: Plants of the World Online
- Commercial: No
- Launched: March 2017; 9 years ago

Plants of the World Online (POWO) is an online taxonomic database published by the Royal Botanic Gardens, Kew.

== History ==
Following the Convention on Biological Diversity, the Royal Botanic Gardens in Kew launched Plants of the World Online in March 2017 with the goal of creating an exhaustive online database of all seed-bearing plants worldwide. The initial focus was on tropical African flora, particularly flora Zambesiaca, flora of West and East Tropical Africa.

Since March 2024, the website has displayed AI-generated predictions of the extinction risk for all 328,565 known species of flowering plants.

== Description ==
The database uses the same taxonomic source as the International Plant Names Index, which is the World Checklist of Vascular Plants (WCVP).

The database contains information on the world's flora gathered from 250 years of botanical research. It aims to make available data from projects that no longer have an online presence or were never externally available. POWO includes information on the taxonomy, identification, distribution, traits, threat status, and uses of plants worldwide, and it also contains many images.

As of March 2026, POWO contained 1,444,000 global plant names, 530,400 detailed descriptions, and 509,900 images.

== See also ==
- Australian Plant Name Index
- Convention on Biological Diversity
- eMonocot
- International Plant Names Index
- Tropicos
- World Flora Online
