= Apodolirion bolusii =

Scientific classification
- Kingdom: Plantae
- Clade: Tracheophytes
- Clade: Angiosperms
- Clade: Monocots
- Order: Asparagales
- Family: Amaryllidaceae
- Subfamily: Amaryllidoideae
- Genus: Apodolirion
- Species: A. bolusii

Binomial name
- Apodolirion bolusii Baker

Species of flowering plant

Apodolirion bolusii is a geophyte belonging to the Amaryllidaceae family. The species is endemic to the Eastern Cape and occurs in the Valley of Desolation near Graaff-Reinet and is part of the Nama Karoo. The only specimen was collected in 1868 and the plant is considered extinct.
