= Apodolirion amyanum =

Scientific classification
- Kingdom: Plantae
- Clade: Tracheophytes
- Clade: Angiosperms
- Clade: Monocots
- Order: Asparagales
- Family: Amaryllidaceae
- Subfamily: Amaryllidoideae
- Genus: Apodolirion
- Species: A. amyanum

Binomial name
- Apodolirion amyanum D.Müll.-Doblies

Species of flowering plant

Apodolirion amyanum, commonly known as Amy's apodolirion, is a geophyte belonging to the Amaryllidaceae family. The species is endemic to the Eastern Cape and occurs between the Bushman's River and the Kariega Rivers near Grahamstown. The plant has a range of <500 km^{2} and there are fewer than subpopulations. The plant is threatened by, among other things, invasive plants.
