= Gethyllis uteana =

Scientific classification
- Kingdom: Plantae
- Clade: Tracheophytes
- Clade: Angiosperms
- Clade: Monocots
- Order: Asparagales
- Family: Amaryllidaceae
- Subfamily: Amaryllidoideae
- Genus: Gethyllis
- Species: G. uteana

Binomial name
- Gethyllis uteana D.Müll.-Doblies

Species of plant

Gethyllis uteana is a perennial geophyte belonging to the genus Gethyllis. The species is endemic to the Western Cape.
