= Gethyllis britteniana =

Conservation status
- Least Concern (IUCN 2.3)

Scientific classification
- Kingdom: Plantae
- Clade: Tracheophytes
- Clade: Angiosperms
- Clade: Monocots
- Order: Asparagales
- Family: Amaryllidaceae
- Subfamily: Amaryllidoideae
- Genus: Gethyllis
- Species: G. britteniana

Binomial name
- Gethyllis britteniana Baker

Species of plant

Gethyllis britteniana, commonly known as the common Sandveld kukumakranka or kukumakranka, is a perennial geophyte belonging to the genus Gethyllis and is part of the fynbos and Succulent Karoo. The species is endemic to the Northern Cape and the Western Cape.

The species has three subspecies:

- Gethyllis britteniana subsp. britteniana
- Gethyllis britteniana subsp. bruynsii D.Müll.-Doblies
- Gethyllis britteniana subsp. herrei (L.Bolus) D.Müll.-Doblies
