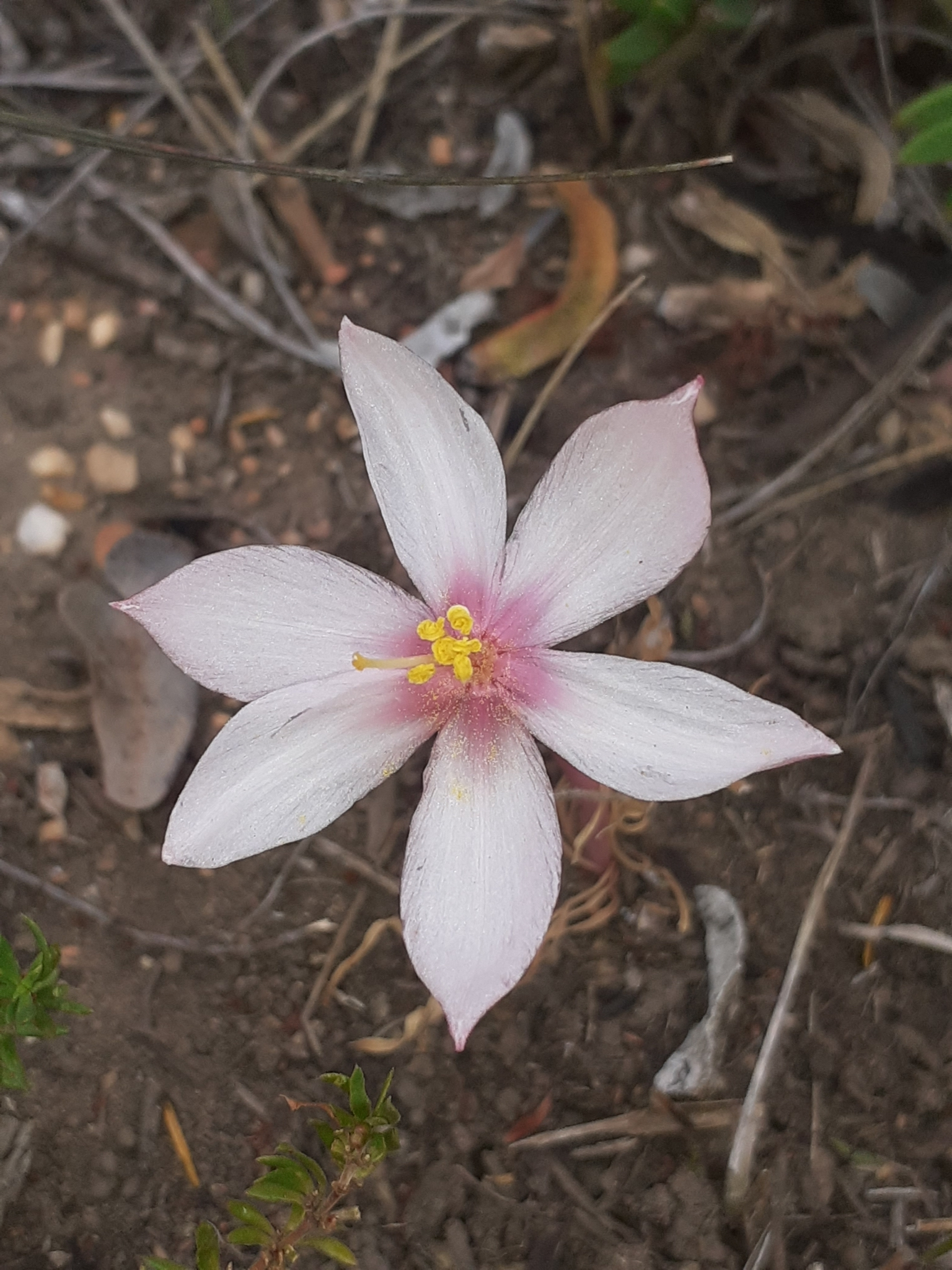

Scientific classification
- Kingdom: Plantae
- Clade: Tracheophytes
- Clade: Angiosperms
- Clade: Monocots
- Order: Asparagales
- Family: Amaryllidaceae
- Subfamily: Amaryllidoideae
- Genus: Gethyllis
- Species: G. spiralis

Binomial name
- Gethyllis spiralis (Thunb). Thunb.

Synonyms
- Abapus spiralis (Thunb.) Raf.; Gethyllis rosea Eckl.; Gethyllis unilateralis L.Bolus; Papiria spiralis Thunb.

= Gethyllis spiralis =

Species of fruit and plant

Gethyllis spiralis, commonly called koekmakranka, is a bulbous plant endemic to the Sandveld of the Cape Province of South Africa. It is much sought after for its enticingly scented fruit that it bears underground. It is recognisable by its spiralling grey-green strap-like leaves.
