= Gethyllis grandiflora =

Scientific classification
- Kingdom: Plantae
- Clade: Tracheophytes
- Clade: Angiosperms
- Clade: Monocots
- Order: Asparagales
- Family: Amaryllidaceae
- Subfamily: Amaryllidoideae
- Genus: Gethyllis
- Species: G. grandiflora

Binomial name
- Gethyllis grandiflora L.Bolus

Species of plant

Gethyllis grandiflora, commonly known as the large-flowered kukumakranka, is a perennial geophyte belonging to the genus Gethyllis and is part of the Succulent Karoo. The species is endemic to the Northern Cape and occurs from the Richtersveld Mountains to Komaggas. The plant's fruit is eaten by the Nama people of the area.
