= Apodolirion macowanii =

Scientific classification
- Kingdom: Plantae
- Clade: Tracheophytes
- Clade: Angiosperms
- Clade: Monocots
- Order: Asparagales
- Family: Amaryllidaceae
- Subfamily: Amaryllidoideae
- Genus: Apodolirion
- Species: A. macowanii

Binomial name
- Apodolirion macowanii Baker

Species of flowering plant

Apodolirion macowanii, commonly known as the spiralled leaf ground lily or MacOwan's ground lily, is a geophyte belonging to the Amaryllidaceae family. The species is endemic to the Eastern Cape and occurs from Jeffreys Bay to the Great Fish River. Of the six subpopulations, two have already been destroyed by suburban development in Port Elizabeth while two others are threatened by development at Kouga and Papiesfontein. The loss is estimated at 33% of the population.
