= Gethyllis fimbriatula =

Scientific classification
- Kingdom: Plantae
- Clade: Tracheophytes
- Clade: Angiosperms
- Clade: Monocots
- Order: Asparagales
- Family: Amaryllidaceae
- Subfamily: Amaryllidoideae
- Genus: Gethyllis
- Species: G. fimbriatula

Binomial name
- Gethyllis fimbriatula D.Müll.-Doblies

Species of plant

Gethyllis fimbriatula is a perennial geophyte belonging to the genus Gethyllis and is part of the fynbos. The species is endemic to the Western Cape and occurs at Matjiesfontein.
