= Apodolirion lanceolatum =

Scientific classification
- Kingdom: Plantae
- Clade: Tracheophytes
- Clade: Angiosperms
- Clade: Monocots
- Order: Asparagales
- Family: Amaryllidaceae
- Subfamily: Amaryllidoideae
- Genus: Apodolirion
- Species: A. lanceolatum

Binomial name
- Apodolirion lanceolatum (Thunb.) Benth. & Hook.f. ex B.D.Jacks.

Synonyms
- Gethyllis lanceolata (Thunb.) Thunb.; Papiria lanceolata Thunb.

Species of flowering plant

Apodolirion lanceolatum is a geophyte belonging to the Amaryllidaceae family. The species is endemic to the Western Cape, occurring from Barrydale to Mossel Bay and is part of the fynbos biome. More research is needed on the plant before its taxonomy can be finalized.
