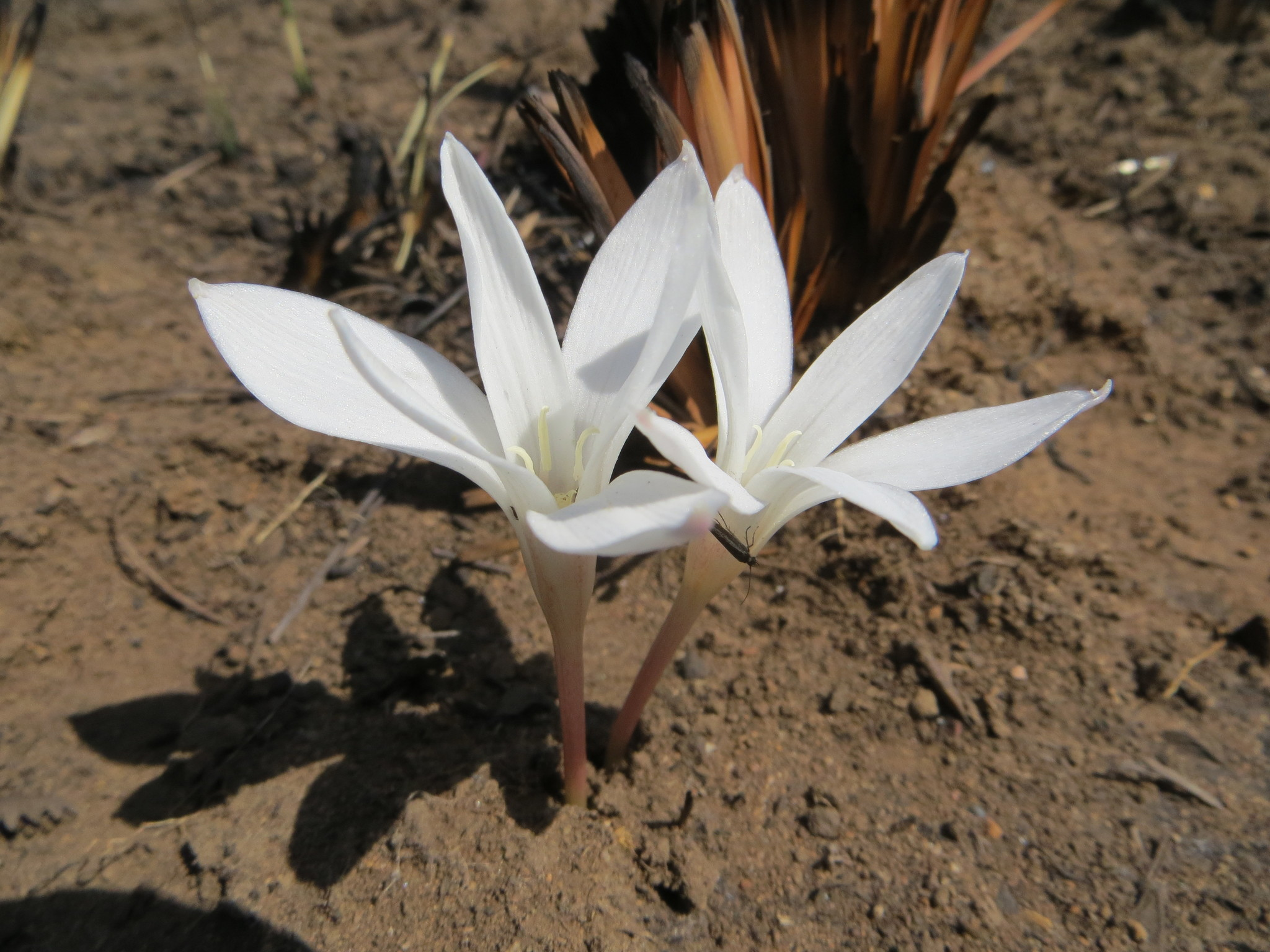
- Apodolirion buchananii

Scientific classification
- Kingdom: Plantae
- Clade: Tracheophytes
- Clade: Angiosperms
- Clade: Monocots
- Order: Asparagales
- Family: Amaryllidaceae
- Subfamily: Amaryllidoideae
- Genus: Apodolirion; Baker

Type species
- Apodolirion buchananii (Baker) Baker

Species
- See here
- It is endemic to Southern Africa

= Apodolirion =

Genus of flowering plants

Apodolirion is a genus of herbaceous, perennial and bulbous plants in the Amaryllis family (Amaryllidaceae, subfamily Amaryllidoideae). It consists of 6 species native to Southern Africa.

== Description ==
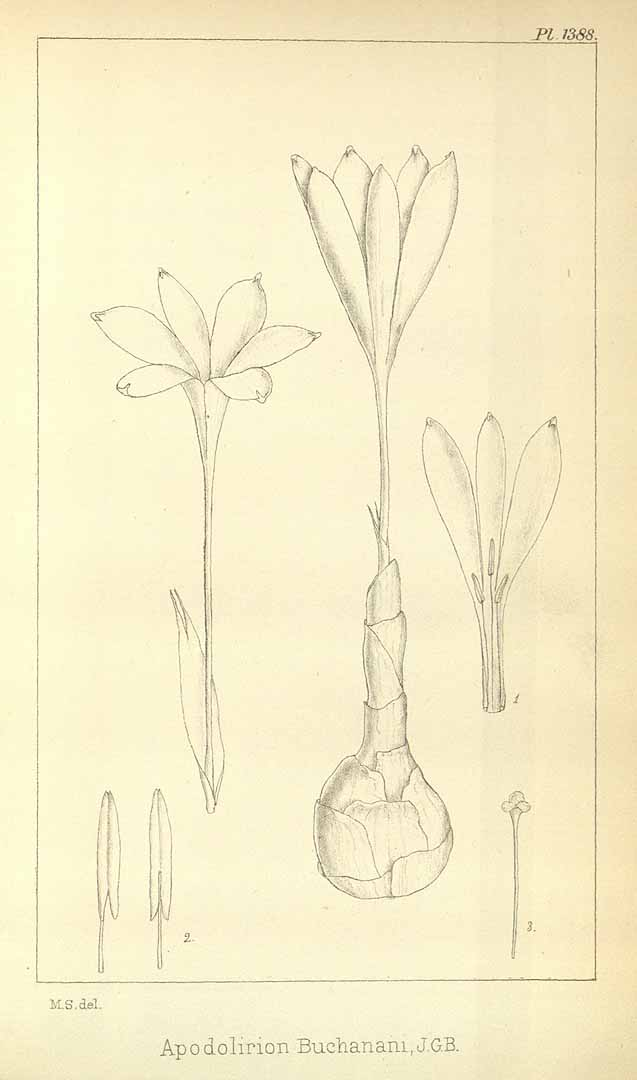
Illustration of Apodolirion buchanii

=== Vegetative characteristics ===
Apodolirion are bulbous plants with tunicate bulbs.

=== Generative characteristics ===
The fragrant, ephemeral, tubular, delicate, solitary, sessile flower has a perianth of six tepals. The androecium consists of 6 stamens. The gynoecium consists of 3 carpels. The stigma is tri-lobed. The long, cylindrical, fragrant fruit bears many small, hard seeds.

=== Cytology ===
The basic chromosome number is x = 6.

== Taxonomy ==
It was published by John Gilbert Baker in 1878. The lectotype species Apodolirion buchananii (Baker) Baker was designated in 1951. It is placed in the tribe Haemantheae. Apodolirion and Gethyllis may represent a single genus.

=== Etymology ===
The generic name Apodolirion means "stemless flower".

=== Species ===
It has six species:

- Apodolirion amyanum D.Müll.-Doblies
- Apodolirion bolusii Baker
- Apodolirion buchananii (Baker) Baker
- Apodolirion cedarbergense D.Müll.-Doblies
- Apodolirion lanceolatum (Thunb.) Benth. & Hook.f. ex B.D.Jacks.
- Apodolirion macowanii Baker

== Ecology ==
=== Habitat ===
It occurs in the summer rainfall regions of South Africa.

=== Pollination ===
The flowers are pollinated by bees.

=== Seed dispersal ===
The seeds are dispersed by ants.

== Conservation ==
Apodolirion amyanum is classified as Endangered (EN) according to the Red List of South African plants.

== Uses ==
A. buchananii (known as "Natal Crocus") is cultivated as an ornamental plant. It is a small plant with solitary flowers, that bloom in spring.
