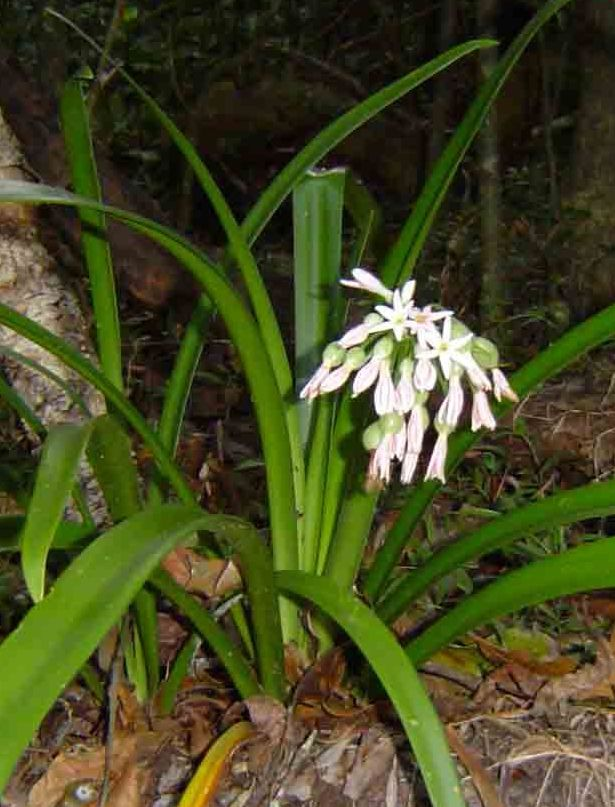
- Cryptostephanus vansonii

Scientific classification
- Kingdom: Plantae
- Clade: Tracheophytes
- Clade: Angiosperms
- Clade: Monocots
- Order: Asparagales
- Family: Amaryllidaceae
- Subfamily: Amaryllidoideae
- Genus: Cryptostephanus; Welw. ex Baker

= Cryptostephanus =

Genus of flowering plants

Cryptostephanus is a genus of African plants in the family Amaryllidaceae, native to Kenya, Tanzania, Angola, Mozambique, Zimbabwe and Namibia. Its closest relative is Clivia, with which it shares some characters, including thick, fleshy roots, strap-like leaves, and fruit in the form of a berry.

== Species ==
Recognized species:

image	Scientific name	Distribution
	Cryptostephanus densiflorus Welw. ex Baker	Angola, Namibia
	Cryptostephanus haemanthoides Pax	Kenya, Tanzania
	Cryptostephanus vansonii Verd.	Mozambique, Zimbabwe
