= Hamilton Paul Traub =

American botanist (1890–1983)

Hamilton Paul Traub (June 18, 1890 – July 14, 1983) was an American botanist. He specialized in the study of Amaryllidaceae. He also did horticultural studies on beans. Dr Traub was one of the founding members of the American Amaryllis Society (now the International Bulb Society) in 1933, and for a long time the editor of its annual publication, variously called Year Book, American Amaryllis Society, Herbertia and Plant Life: Amaryllis Year Book.

== Systematic treatment of Amaryllidaceae ==
Subfamilies (4)

1. Allioideae 4 tribes
2. Hemerocalloideae 1 tribe: Hemerocalleae
3. Ixiolirioideae 2 tribes
4. Amarylloideae (2 infrafamilies: Amarylloidinae 12 tribes, Pancratioidinae 4 tribes)

== Selected publications ==
- Traub, H.P. (1958). The Amaryllis Manual. New York: Macmillan. Archived from the original on 2015-05-19.
- Traub, H.P. (1963). Genera of the Amaryllidaceae. La Jolla, California: American Plant Life Society.
- Traub, H. P. (1967). "Review of the genus Nerine Herb". Plant Life. 3: 3–32.
- Traub, Hamilton P (1968). "The subgenera, sections and subsections of Allium L.". Plant Life. 24: 147–163.
- An introduction to Herbert's Amaryllidaceae, etc. 1837: And related works. 1970. Ed. Cramer. 93 pp.
- Traub, H.P. (1980). "The Subgenera of the Genus Amaryllis". Plant Life. 36: 43–45.
- Traub, H. P. (1982). Order Alliales. Pl. Life 38: 119–132.
