= International Bulb Society =

International botanical organization

- Website: http://www.bulbsociety.org/

The International Bulb Society was founded on May 31, 1933 and is an international society dedicated to informing the public about the science, cultivation, conservation and botany of geophytic plants, commonly known as bulbs.

It began in 1933 as the American Amaryllis Society, publishing its first yearbook (Year Book, American Amaryllis Society) in 1934. One of its founders was Hamilton Traub, who edited the yearbook in its early days. Two years later (1936) the title was changed to Herbertia. Later the society was renamed the American Plant Life Society, and its yearbook was called Plant Life. Amaryllis Year Book. In 1984 Plant Life became Herbertia again. The society became inactive in January 2014.

== Awards ==
- The Herbert Medal - the society awards this medal to people who have made outstanding contributions to the study of geophytic plants.
- The Hamilton P. Traub Outstanding Service Award - the society awards this medal to persons who provide outstanding service to the society.

== Publications ==
- Series 1, Vols. 3–15, 1936–48;
- Series 2, Vols. 16–26, 1949–59; vol. 40-, 1984-
