= Subtribe =

Taxonomic category rank

In a social and political context, a subtribe is a subgroup within a broader communal or identity bloc that functions as a distinct social unit. Subtribes are defined less by strict lineage and more by shared religious affiliation, ethnic origin, ideology, locality, language, or historical experience. These identities are socially constructed and maintained through institutions such as education, residential patterns, marriage networks, and political organization, and they can strongly shape collective political behavior.

The Kipsigis people may be understood as a subgroup within the broader Kalenjin ethnolinguistic community. Such a subgroup would be considered a subtribe as it presents as a socially recognized identity category with distinct communal boundaries and political or social cohesion.

== Taxonomy ==
This term also serves as a formal taxonomic rank in biological science, where it is positioned directly below a tribe and above a genus. Following this hierarchy, Cliviinae is a botanical subtribe categorized under the tribe Haemantheae within the family Amaryllidaceae. While the term subtribe identifies a specific branch within a larger lineage in both fields, the zoological and botanical nomenclature employs different suffixes for subtribal names:

Animals
zoological -ina (e.g., Canina)
Plants
botanical -inae (e.g., Cliviinae)
