= Plant Systematics and Evolution =

- Discipline: Botany
- Language: English
- Edited by: Marcus A. Koch, Martin A. Lysak, Karol Marhold

Publication details
- Former name(s): Österreichisches botanisches Wochenblatt, Österreichische botanische Zeitschrift, Wiener botanische Zeitschrift
- History: 1851–present
- Publisher: Springer Science+Business Media
- Frequency: Biannual
- Open access: Hybrid
- Impact factor: 1.154 (2013)

Standard abbreviations
- ISO 4: Plant Syst. Evol.

Indexing
- CODEN: ESPFBP
- ISSN: 0378-2697 (print); 2199-6881 (web)
- LCCN: 75647172
- JSTOR: 03782697
- OCLC no.: 47207423

Links
- Journal homepage; Online archive

Plant Systematics and Evolution is a biannual peer-reviewed scientific journal covering systematic botany and evolutionary biology. The editors-in-chief are Marcus A. Koch (Heidelberg University), Martin A. Lysak (Masaryk University), and Karol Marhold (Slovak Academy of Sciences).

== History ==
The journal was established in Vienna in 1851 under founding editor-in-chief Alexander Skofitz as Österreichisches Botanisches Wochenblatt (Austrian Botanical Weekly). In 1858 the publication was renamed Österreichische Botanische Zeitschrift (Austrian Journal of Botany) and it continued under that title from volume 9 to 91. In 1943 and 1944, two volumes were published under the title Wiener botanische Zeitschrift (Viennese Botanical Journal). It then continued under its previous title until 1973 when it was relaunched with a more international scope under its current title.

== Abstracting and indexing ==
The journal is abstracted and indexed in Agricola, Biological Abstracts, CAB Abstracts, Chemical Abstracts Service, EMBiology, International Bibliography of Periodical Literature, Scopus, Current Contents/Agriculture, Biology & Environmental Sciences, The Zoological Record, BIOSIS Previews, and the Science Citation Index. According to the Journal Citation Reports, the journal has a 2013 impact factor of 1.154.
