= Kaffir =

Kaffir or Kafir may refer to:

== Ethnicity and religion ==
- Kafir, an Arabic term meaning the one who conceals something or rejects it, while in religious context it means a non-believer in God.
- Kaffir (racial term), an ethnic slur used in South Africa
- The Nuristani people, an ethnic group of Pakistan and Afghanistan
- Sri Lanka Kaffir people, an ethnic group

== Languages ==
- Fanagalo, a Zulu-based pidgin language once referred to as Kitchen Kaffir
- Sri Lanka Kaffir language, a creole spoken by that people
- Kafiiri or Kafiristani, terms for the Nuristani languages of the Hindu Kush

== Places ==
- Kaffraria or British Kaffraria, a former designation for King William's Town and East London, South Africa
- Kafir, Idlib, a village in Syria
- Kafiristan, the historic name for the Nuristan Province in Afghanistan
- Kaffrine, a city in Senegal

== Plants ==
- Kaffir lime, a variety of lime fruit native to Southeast Asia, also known as Thai lime or makrut lime
- Kaffir lily (disambiguation), one of two flowers found in southern Africa:
  - Clivia miniata
  - Hesperantha coccinea
- Kafir, kaffir or kaffircorn, another name for the grain sorghum
- Kaffir boom (Erythrina lysistemon), a species of tree in the family Fabaceae

== Other uses ==
- Kaafir (Pakistani TV series), a 2011 television series
- Kaafir (Indian TV series), a 2019 Indian web television series
- Kafir harp
- Sunbeam Kaffir, an engine built by the Sunbeam car company
- African wildcat, formerly known as the Kaffir cat
- Kaffir-D Stone, the alpha form of gypsum (calcium sulphate hemihydrate; (CaSO_{4})1/2H_{2}O) used in the manufacture of dentures.

== See also ==
- Kefir, fermented milk drink
- Cafres
- Tibicos, a fermented beverage known as water kefir
- Infidel
