= Kafr =

Kafr may refer to:

- A Levantine Arabic term for village
- Kafir, an Arabic term for an "infidel"
- Kafr, Iran, a village

== See also ==
- Kafir (disambiguation)
- Al-Kafr
