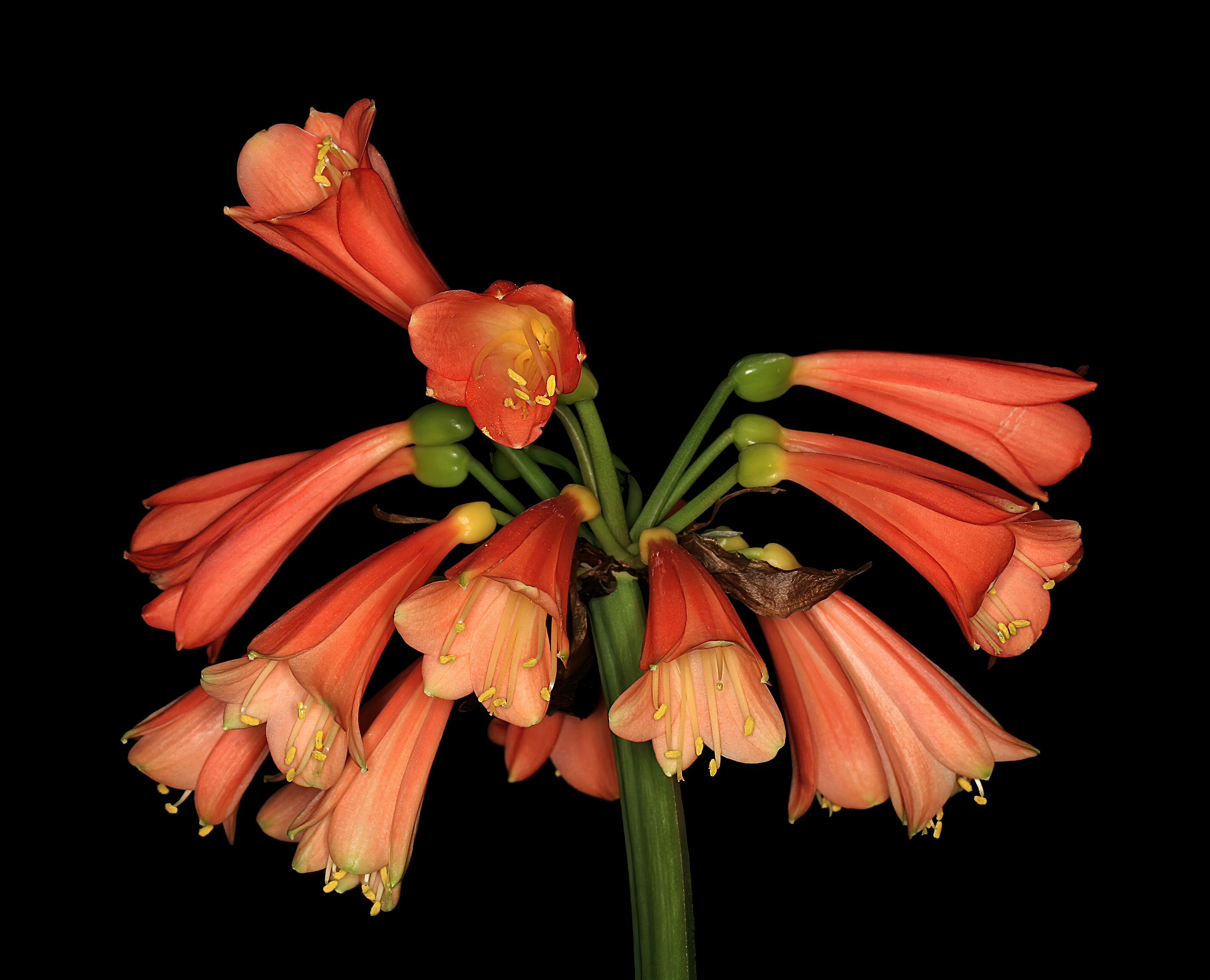

Scientific classification
- Kingdom: Plantae
- Clade: Tracheophytes
- Clade: Angiosperms
- Clade: Monocots
- Order: Asparagales
- Family: Amaryllidaceae
- Subfamily: Amaryllidoideae
- Genus: Clivia
- Species: C. × nimbicola

Binomial name
- Clivia × nimbicola Swanev., Truter & A.E.van Wyk

= Clivia × nimbicola =

Plant hybrid

Clivia × nimbicola is a plant hybrid belonging to the genus Clivia. It is an interspecies hybrid of Clivia caulescens and C. miniata. The species is endemic to Eswatini.
