= C. nobilis =

C. nobilis may refer to:

- Chamaeza nobilis, the striated antthrush, a bird species found in Bolivia, Brazil, Colombia, Ecuador and Peru
- Clivia nobilis, the drooping clivia, a plant species

== See also ==
- Nobilis (disambiguation)
