= Kaffir lily =

Kaffir lily is a common name which may refer to the following ornamental plants:

- Clivia miniata in the family Amaryllidaceae
- Hesperantha coccinea syn. Schizostylis coccinea in the family Iridaceae

The term kaffir is considered highly offensive in South Africa, the native range of both plant species.
