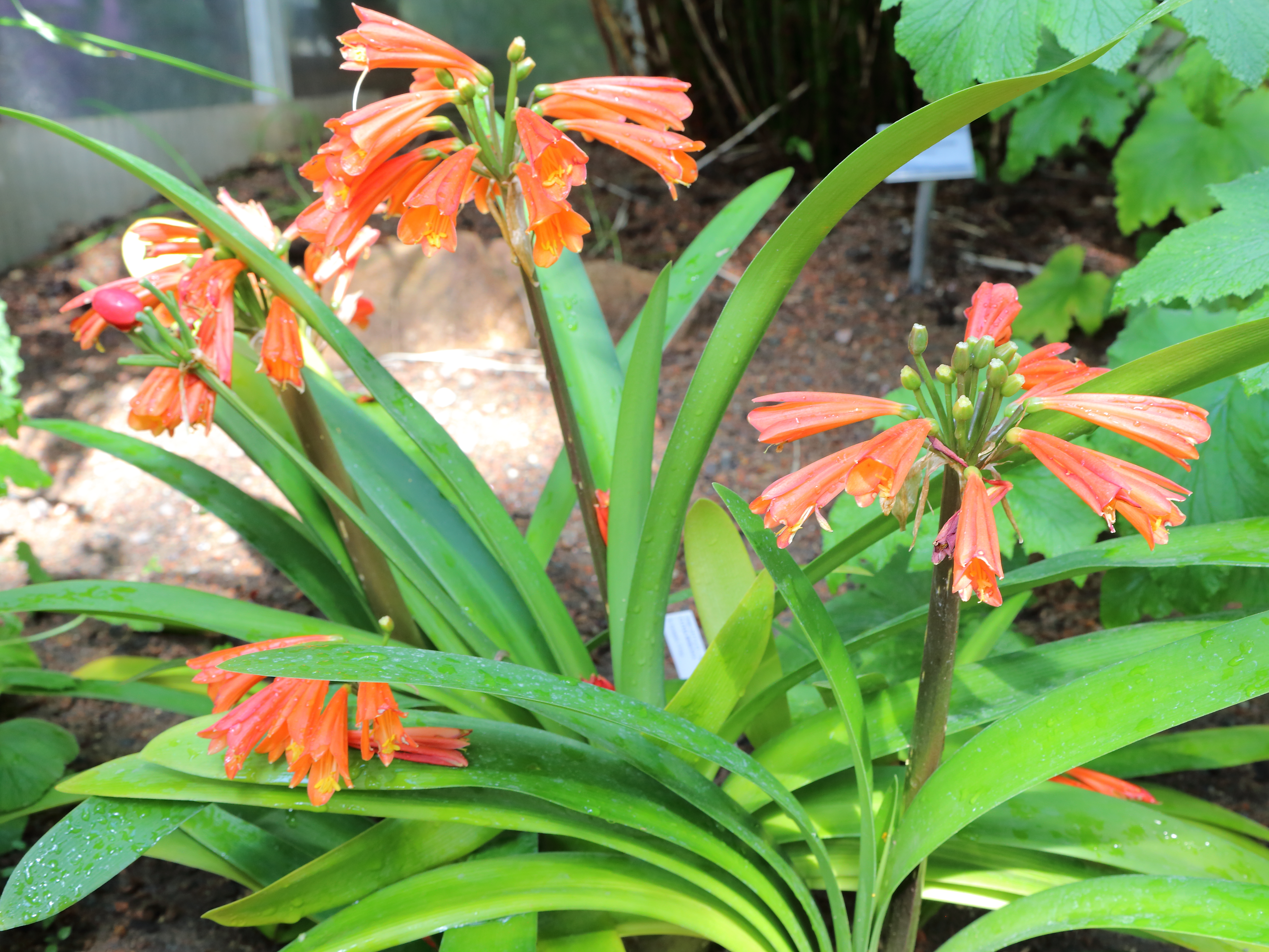

Scientific classification
- Kingdom: Plantae
- Clade: Tracheophytes
- Clade: Angiosperms
- Clade: Monocots
- Order: Asparagales
- Family: Amaryllidaceae
- Subfamily: Amaryllidoideae
- Genus: Clivia
- Species: C. robusta

Binomial name
- Clivia robusta B.G.Murray, Ran, de Lange, Hammett, Truter & Swanev. (2004)

Synonyms
- Clivia robusta var. citrina Swanev., Forb.-Hard., Truter & A.E.van Wyk

= Clivia robusta =

Species of flowering plant

Clivia robusta is a plant and geophyte belonging to the genus Clivia. The species occurs in KwaZulu-Natal and the Eastern Cape from Pondoland and Port St. Johns to the Umzimkulu River north of the Oribira Canyon and has an area of occurrence of 3,100 km^{2}. There are currently less than ten subpopulations and the species has lost 30% of its habitat in the last 90 years due to overuse by traditional healers.
