= Clivia mirabilis =

Scientific classification
- Kingdom: Plantae
- Clade: Tracheophytes
- Clade: Angiosperms
- Clade: Monocots
- Order: Asparagales
- Family: Amaryllidaceae
- Subfamily: Amaryllidoideae
- Genus: Clivia
- Species: C. mirabilis

Binomial name
- Clivia mirabilis Rourke (2000)

Species of flowering plant

Clivia mirabilis is a plant and geophyte belonging to the genus Clivia. The species is endemic to the Northern and Western Cape where it is found on the Bokkeveldberge plateau at Nieuwoudtville where there are two subpopulations. The plant is threatened by its use by horticulturists.
