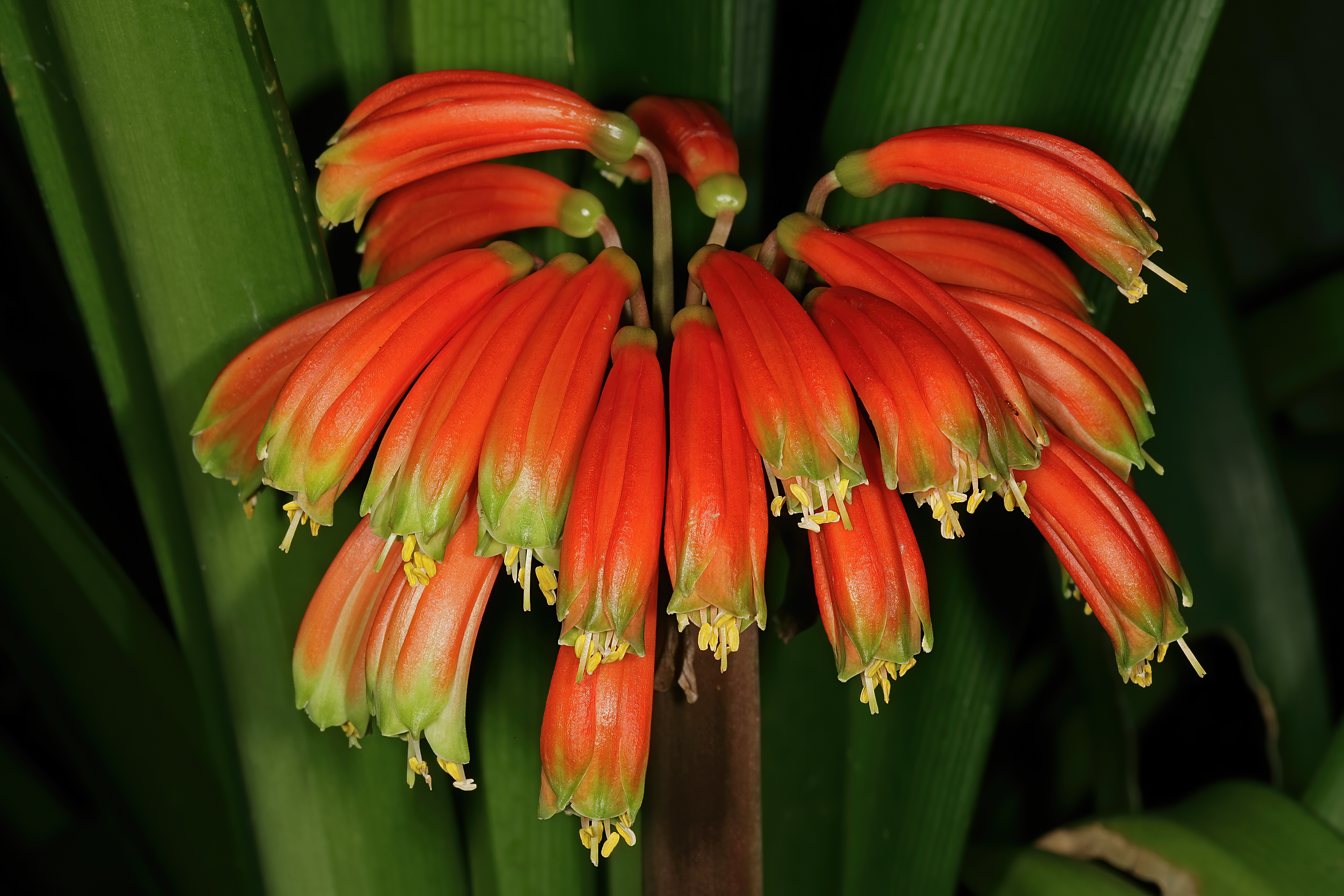

Scientific classification
- Kingdom: Plantae
- Clade: Tracheophytes
- Clade: Angiosperms
- Clade: Monocots
- Order: Asparagales
- Family: Amaryllidaceae
- Subfamily: Amaryllidoideae
- Genus: Clivia
- Species: C. gardenii

Binomial name
- Clivia gardenii Hook. (1855)

Synonyms
- Clivia gardenii var. citrina Swanev., A.E.van Wyk & Truter

= Clivia gardenii =

Species of flowering plant

Clivia gardenii is a plant and geophyte belonging to the genus Clivia. The species occurs in KwaZulu-Natal from the Ngome Forests to the KwaZulu-Natal Midland and has an area of occurrence of 6,900 km^{2}. There are currently less than ten subpopulations and the species has lost 30% of its habitat in the last 90 years due to its excessive use by traditional healers as well as its collection by horticulturalists. The planting of plantations, crop cultivation and development are also threats.
