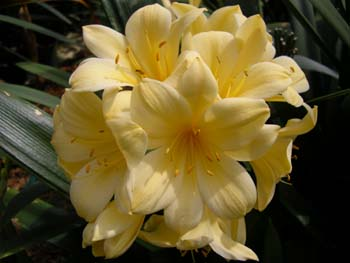
- Clivia miniata var. citrina

Scientific classification
- Kingdom: Plantae
- Clade: Tracheophytes
- Clade: Angiosperms
- Clade: Monocots
- Order: Asparagales
- Family: Amaryllidaceae
- Subfamily: Amaryllidoideae
- Genus: Clivia; Lindl.

Type species
- Clivia nobilis Lindl.

Species
- See text

Synonyms
- Himantophyllum Spreng., orth. var.; Imantophyllum Hook., nom. illeg.; Imatophyllum Hook.

= Clivia =

Genus of flowering plants

Clivia /ˈklaɪviə/ is a genus of monocot flowering plants native to southern Africa. They are from the family Amaryllidaceae, subfamily Amaryllidoideae. Common names are Natal lily or bush lily.

They are herbaceous or evergreen perennial plants, with green, strap-like leaves. Individual flowers are more or less bell-shaped, occurring in umbels on a stalk above the foliage; colors typically range from yellow through orange to red. Many cultivars exist, some with variegated leaf patterns.

== Description ==
Species of Clivia are found only in South Africa and Eswatini. They are typically forest undergrowth plants, adapted to low light (with the exception of C. mirabilis from the Western Cape).

Clivia shares common features with the other members of the subfamily Amaryllidoideae. Individual flowers have three sepals and three petals, all very similar (although the sepals are typically narrower than the petals) and collectively called tepals. In Clivia the tepals are fused at the base to form a tube, although this may be very short. The flower varies in shape from an open cup to a narrow hanging tube. In the species the flowers are mainly in shades of yellow through orange to red. The flowers are arranged in umbels (i.e. the flower-stalks or pedicels radiate from a single point); each umbel has a long stalk or peduncle. Several bracts subtend the umbels. Each flower has six stamens and an inferior ovary (i.e. one which is below the tepals) made up of three locules. The stamens have long filaments and anthers which are free to move on their filaments. The style is longer than the tepals, ending in a short three-part stigma.

Flowering time varies. Typically C. miniata, C. nobilis and C. caulescens flower in late winter and spring; in cultivation, C. miniata has out of season flowers at almost any time. C. gardenii and C. robusta flower in the autumn. Interspecific hybrids and cultivars can flower at almost any time of the year depending on climate and the flowering pattern of their parent species.

A distinctive feature of Clivia – shared with the closely related genus Cryptostephanus – is that unlike most species in the subfamily, it does not form bulbs. The long strap-shaped leaves are evergreen and spring from thick branching roots or rhizomes. Like other members of the tribe Haemantheae to which it belongs, Clivia fruits are berries. When ripe, they contain large fleshy seeds which are often more than 1 cm in diameter.

== Taxonomy ==
It was published by John Lindley in 1828 with Clivia nobilis Lindl. as the type species. It was named in honor of Charlotte Percy (née Clive), Duchess of Northumberland (1787–1866), who was for a time the governess of the future Queen Victoria.

== Evolution and phylogeny ==
Six genera have been placed in the tribe Haemantheae; all are found in Africa. Molecular phylogenetic analysis carried out in 2004 showed that the tribe is monophyletic (i.e. it contains all the descendants of a single common ancestor). Four species of Clivia were included in the analysis:

- Haemantheae
  - Apodolirion, Gethyllis, Haemanthus, Scadoxus
  - - Cryptostephanus
      - C. haemanthioides
      - C. vansonii
    - Clivia
      - - C. caulescens
        - C. gardenii
      - - C. miniata
        - C. nobilis

The bulbless Clivia and Cryptostephanus appear to occupy a basal position within the clade. Meerow and Clayton suggest that a forest understorey habitat, associated with the absence of bulbs and the presence of fruits which are berries, may have been a factor in the evolutionary divergence of the Haemantheae clade from the rest of the subfamily Amaryllidoideae.

== Species ==
As of December 2025, six species are recognized by Plants of the World Online:

- Clivia caulescens R.A.Dyer
- Clivia gardenii Hook.
- Clivia miniata (Lindl.) Bosse
- Clivia mirabilis Rourke
- Clivia nobilis Lindl.
- Clivia robusta B.G.Murray, Ran, de Lange, Hammett, Truter & Swanev.

C. mirabilis was only named in 2000, and C. robusta even later, in 2004. Thus older sources frequently state that there are only four or five species.

=== Natural hybrids ===
- Clivia × nimbicola Swanev., Truter & A.E.van Wyk = C. caulescens × C. miniata
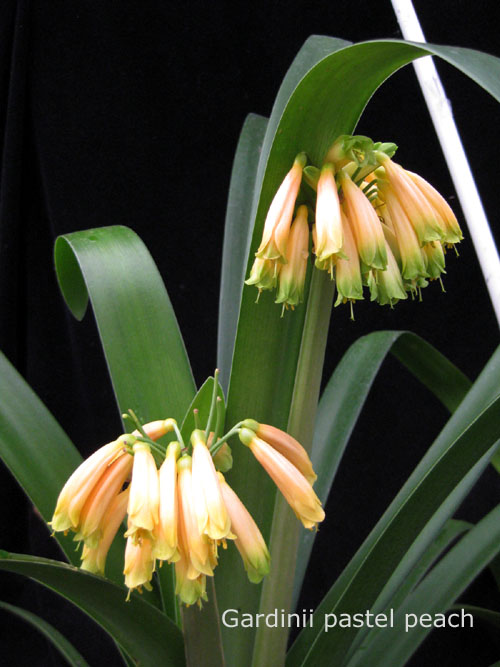
Clivia gardenii

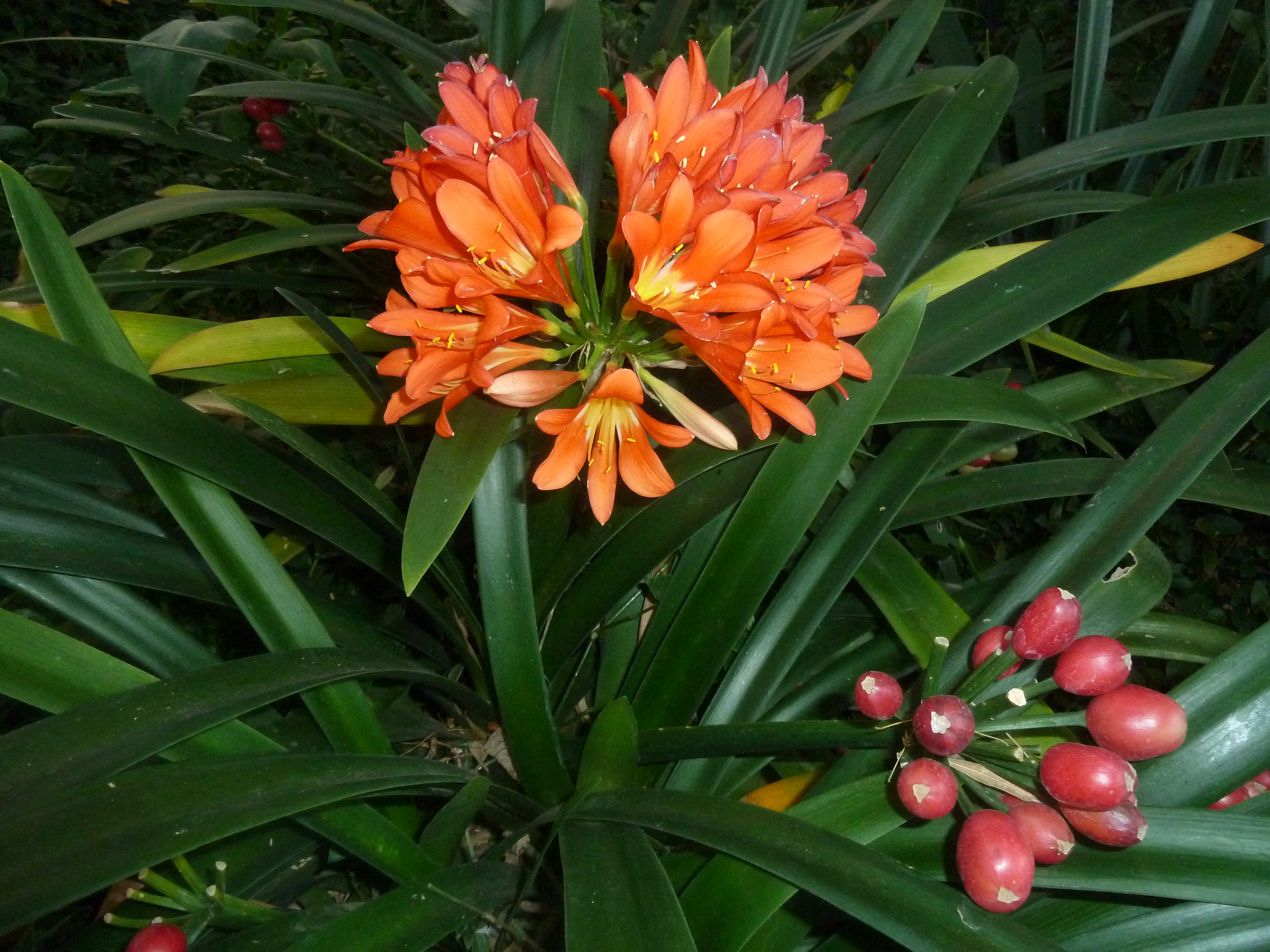
Clivia miniata

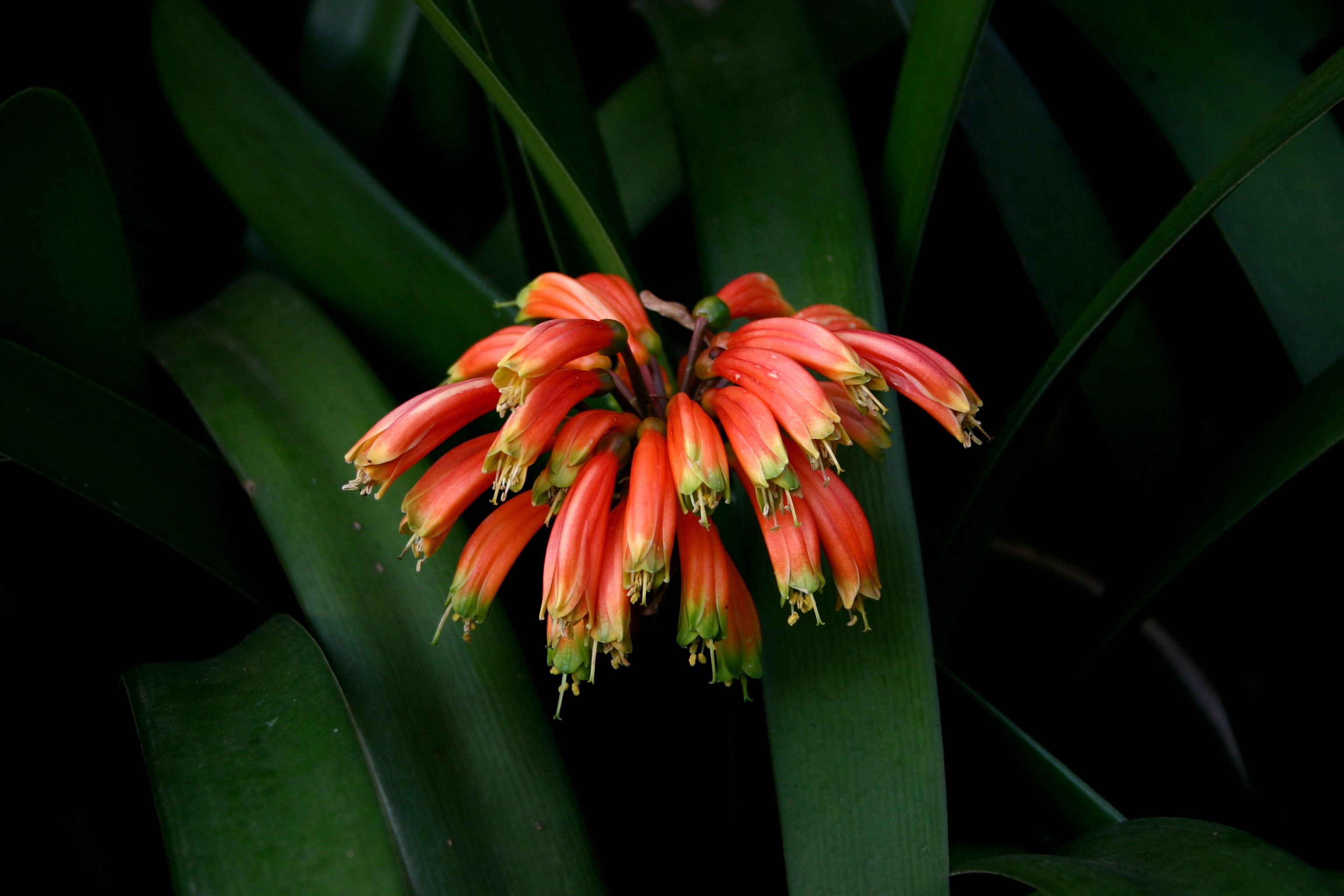
Clivia nobilis

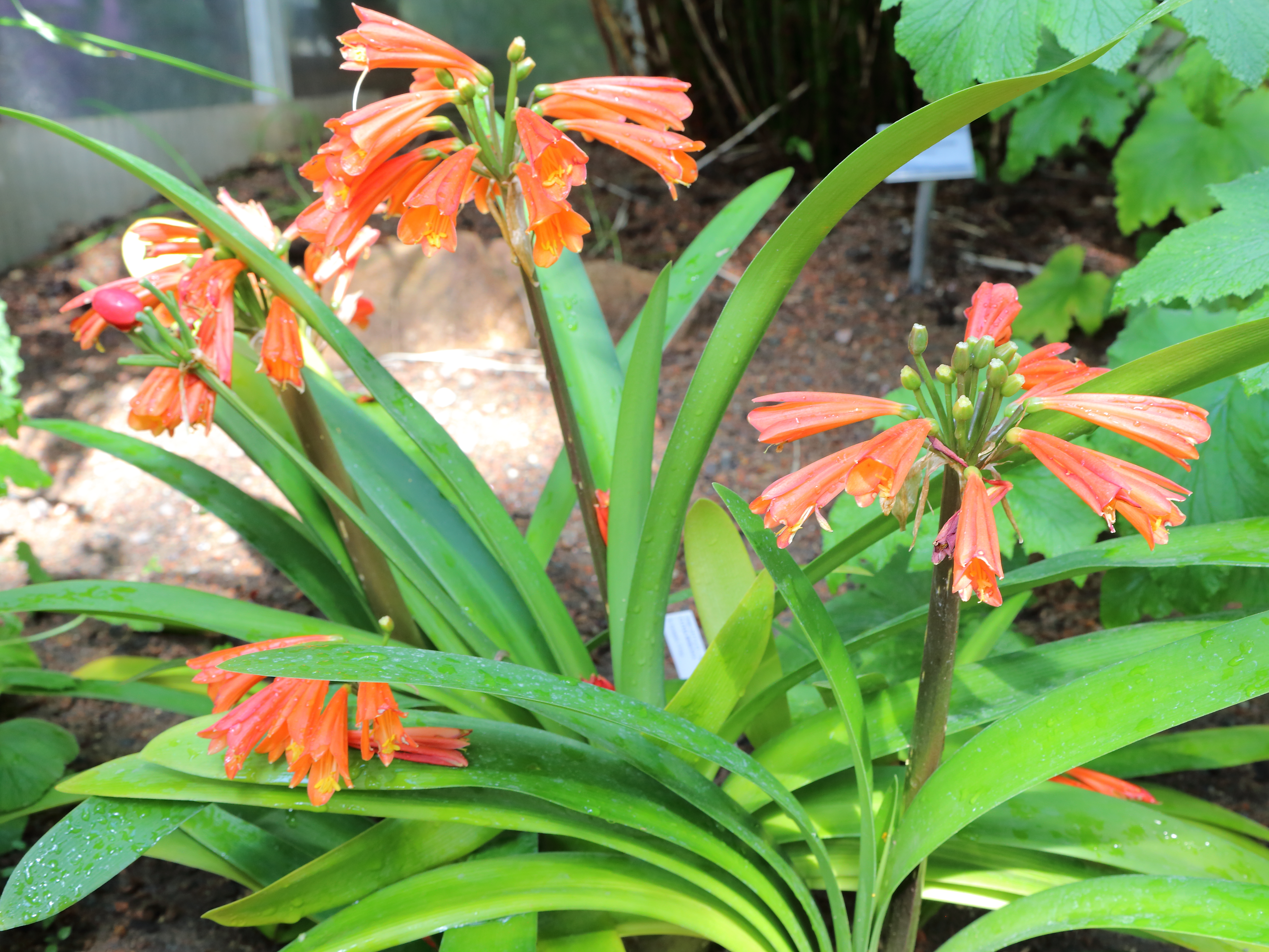
Clivia robusta
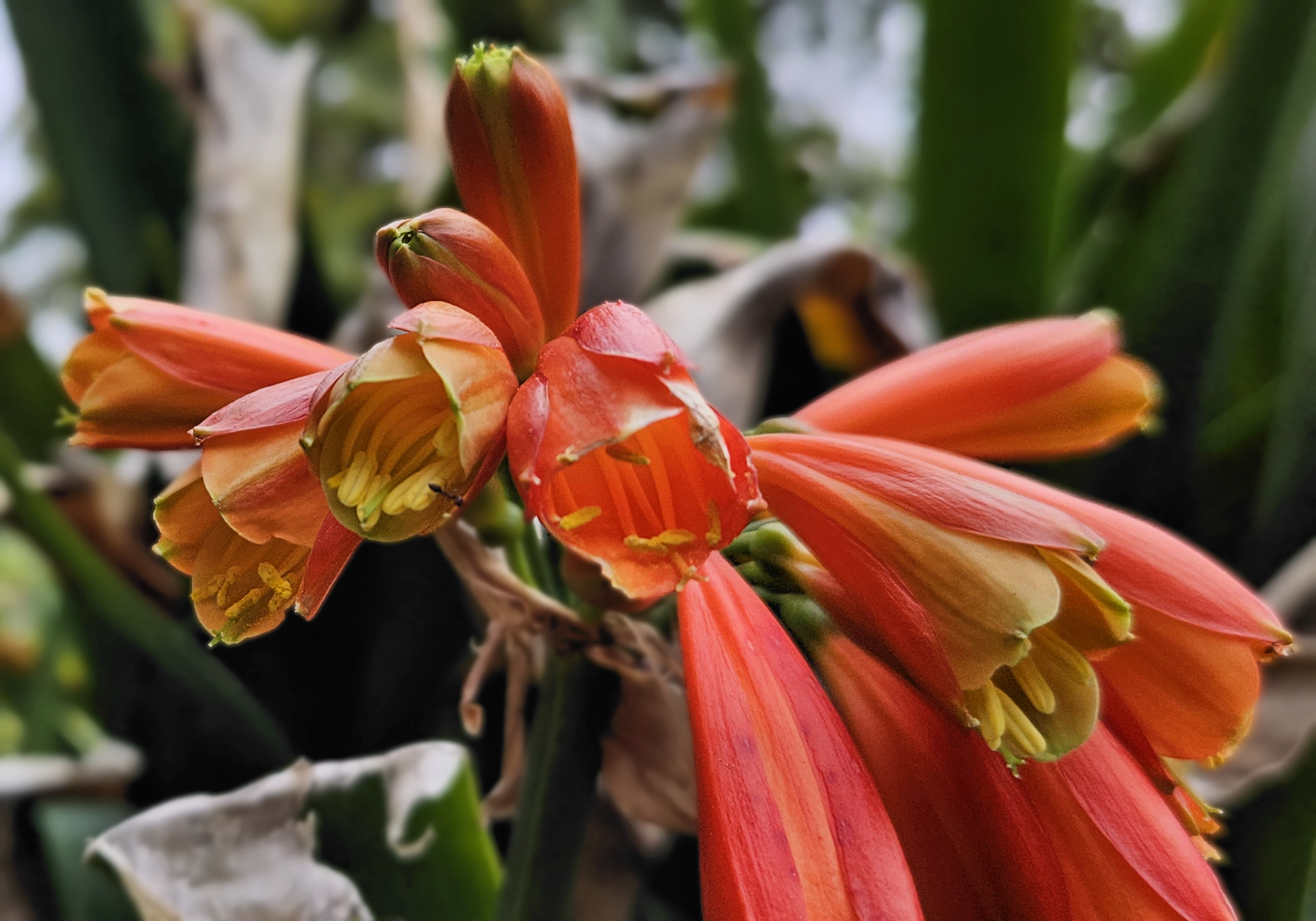
Clivia caulescens

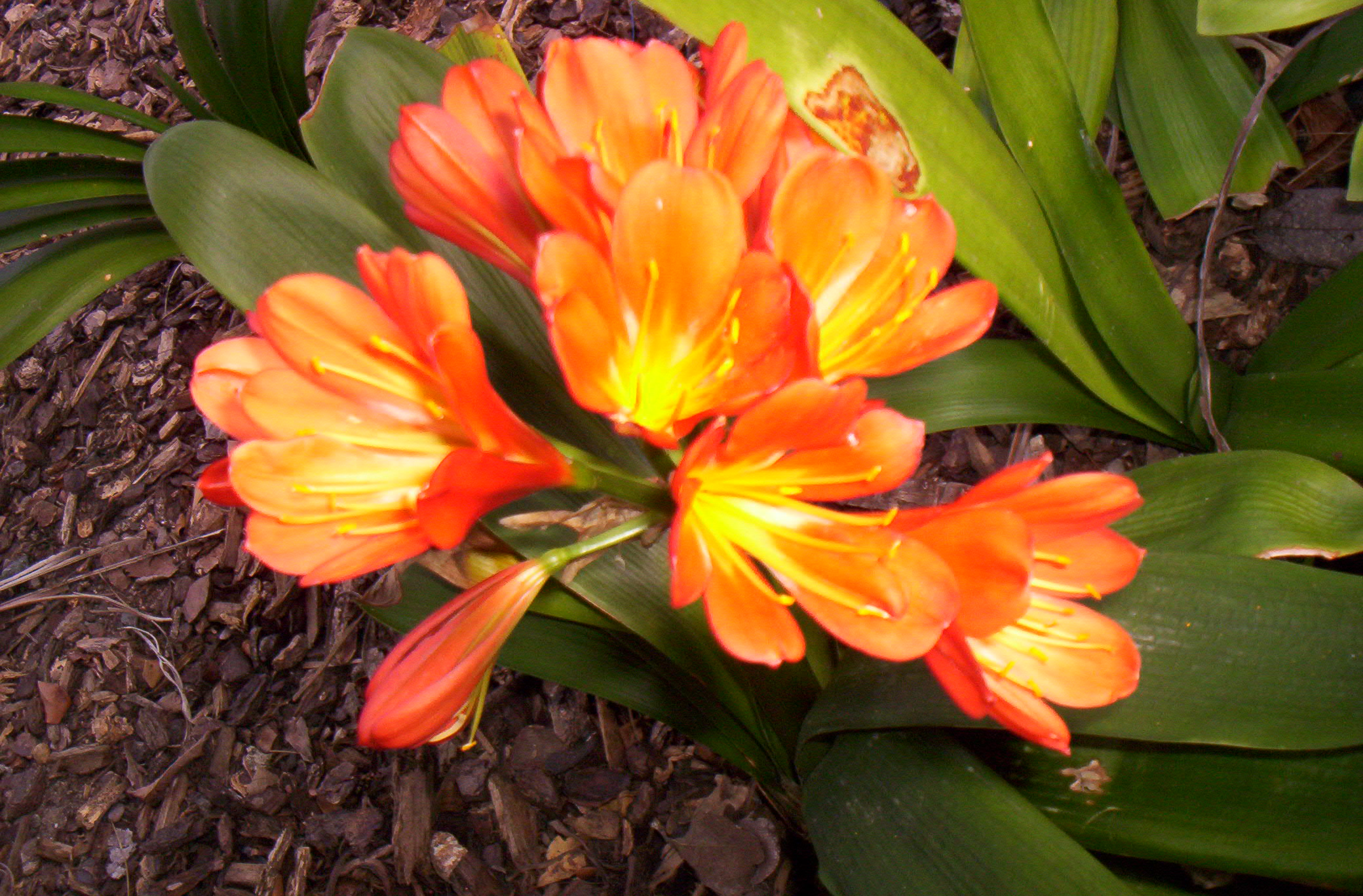
Clivia sp.

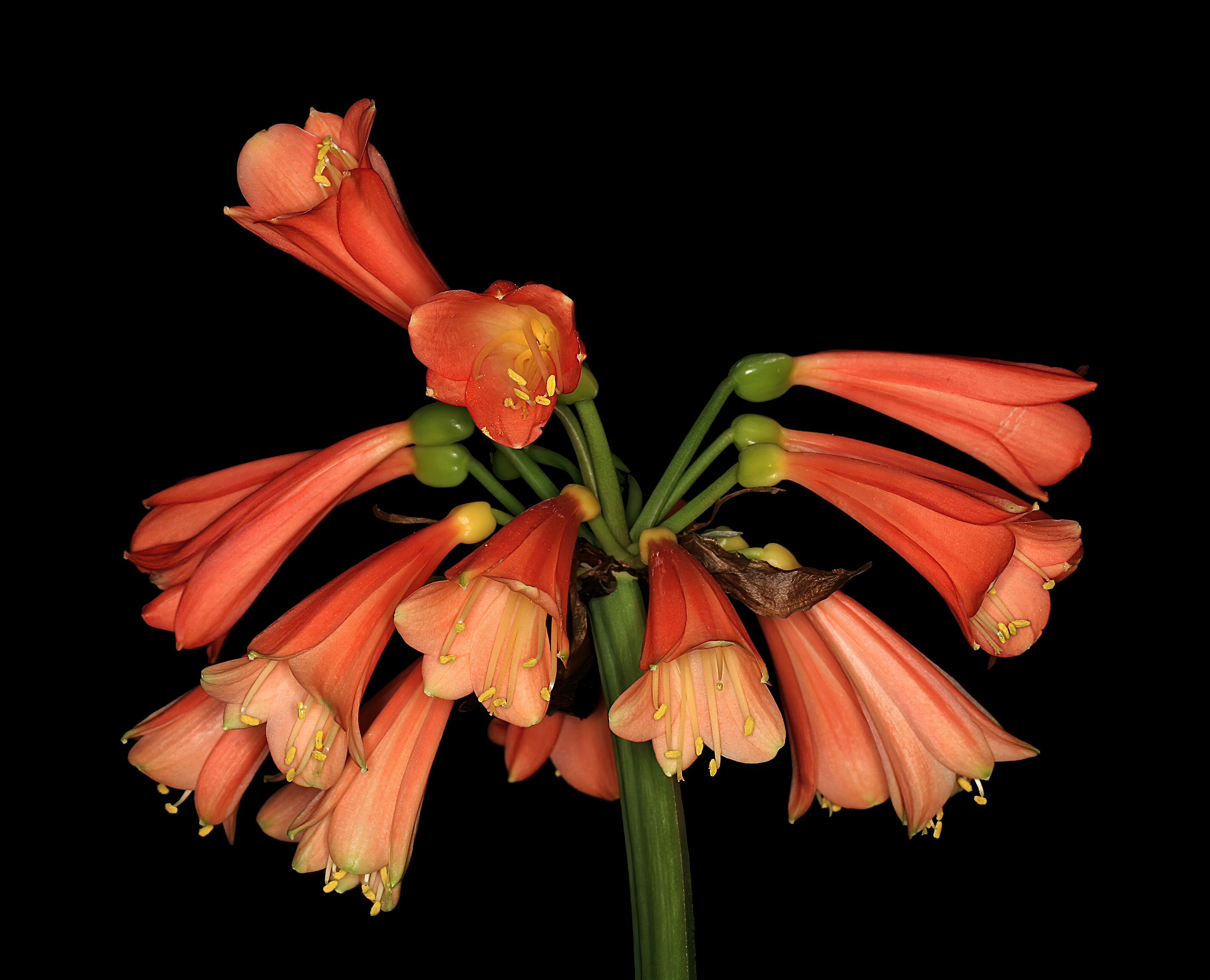
Clivia × nimbicola

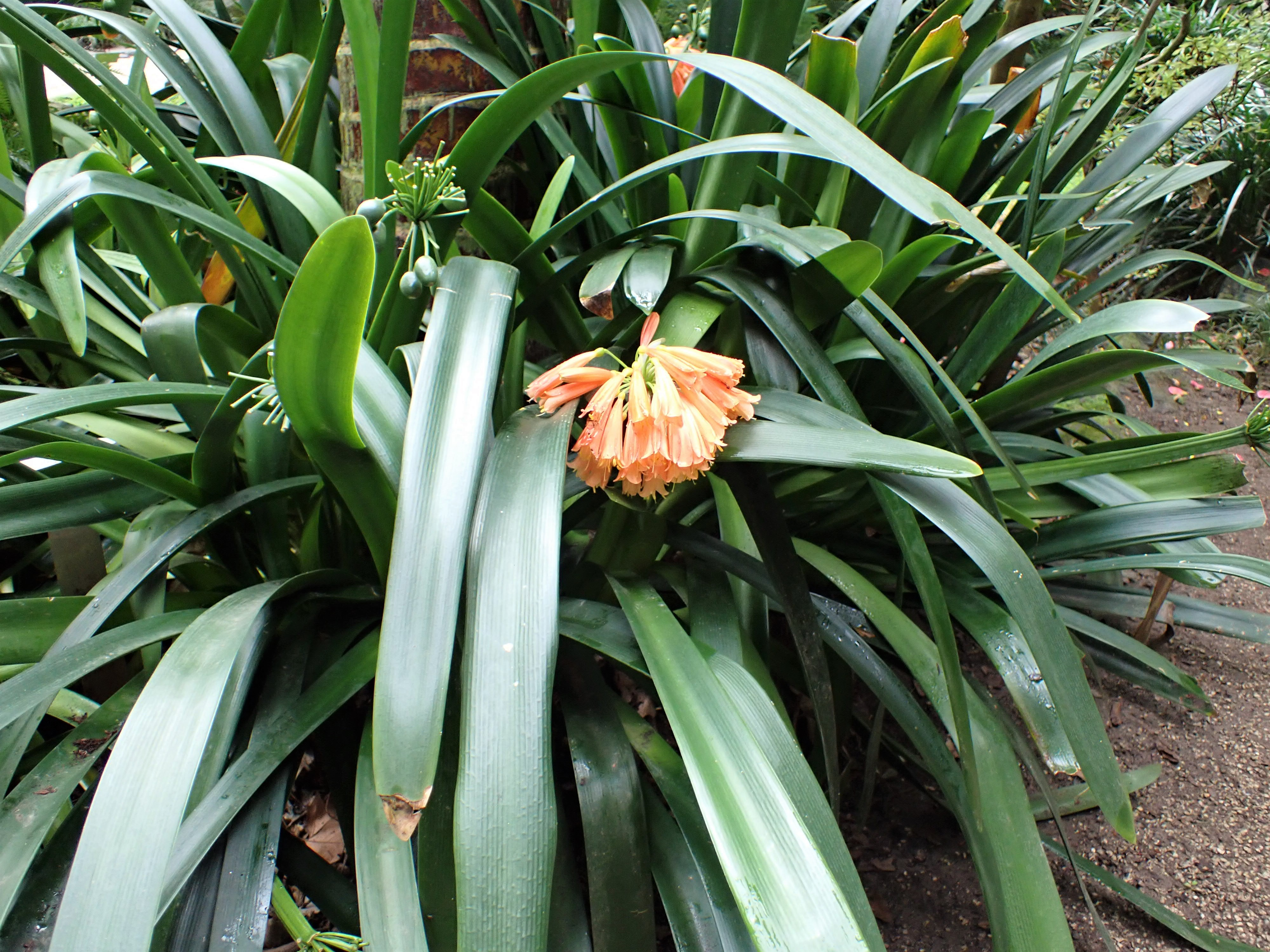
Clivia × cyrtanthiflora, an artificial hybrid

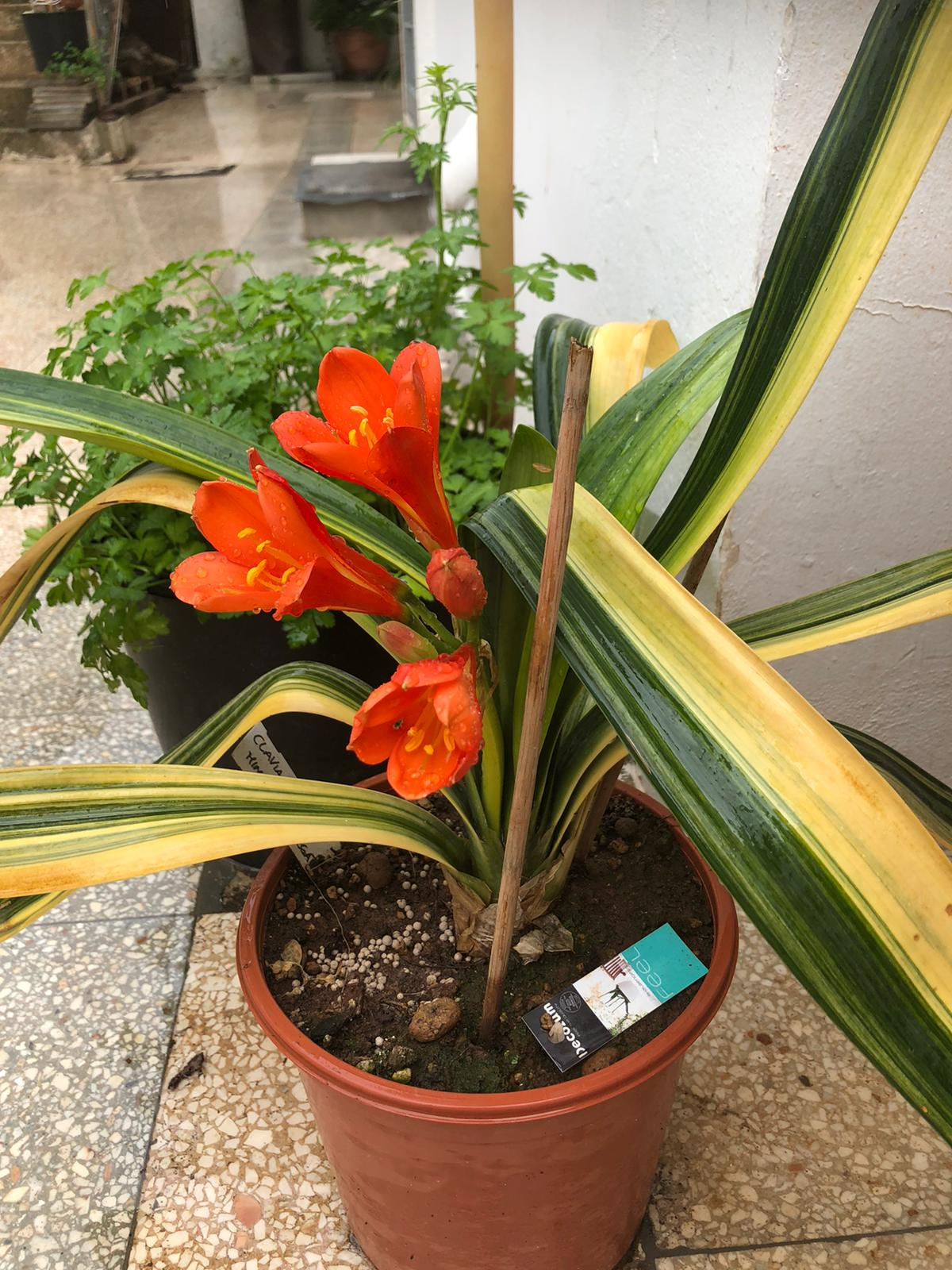
Clivia 'Variegata'

== Cultivation ==
Of the species, Clivia miniata is the most widely cultivated; cultivars with flowers ranging from deep red-orange to pale yellow have been bred by growers. Yellow plants can belong to one of two different groups which breed true for colour, producing seedlings with unpigmented stems and all yellow flowers when mature. When yellows from different groups are crossed, seedlings with pigmented stems occur and the resulting flowers are orange.

C. miniata, C. gardenii, C. robusta and C. caulescens seedlings flower after four to five years. C. nobilis will flower after seven or eight years. It is reported that C. mirabilis also takes about six years to flower.

=== Care ===
In cultivation, it is recommended that plants are watered regularly in summer, although not overwatered, with a resting period from autumn till late winter, when the plants are kept almost dry at 46–50 °F (8–10 °C). Plants can be repotted yearly or every other year in all-purpose potting medium or coconut husks.

Propagation is by seed or by offsets removed when repotting. Seeds are sown on the top of moist material in high humidity.

Pests and diseases include scale insects, mealy bug, amaryllis borer, and rot.

== Toxicity ==
Some species of Clivia, including Clivia miniata, produce small amounts of the alkaloid lycorine. Lycorine is toxic in sufficient quantities, particularly in pets and small children.

== See also ==
- List of plants known as lily

== Bibliography ==
- Spies, P.; Grobler, J.P.; Spies, J.J. (2011). "A review of phylogenetic relationships in the genus Clivia". Philos. Trans. Genet. 1: 168–207.
- Conrad, Ferozah (February 2008). Molecular Systematics, Biogeography and Dating of the tribe Haemantheae (Amaryllidaceae) and the Phylogeography of Clivia (PhD Thesis). Department of Botany, University of Cape Town.
