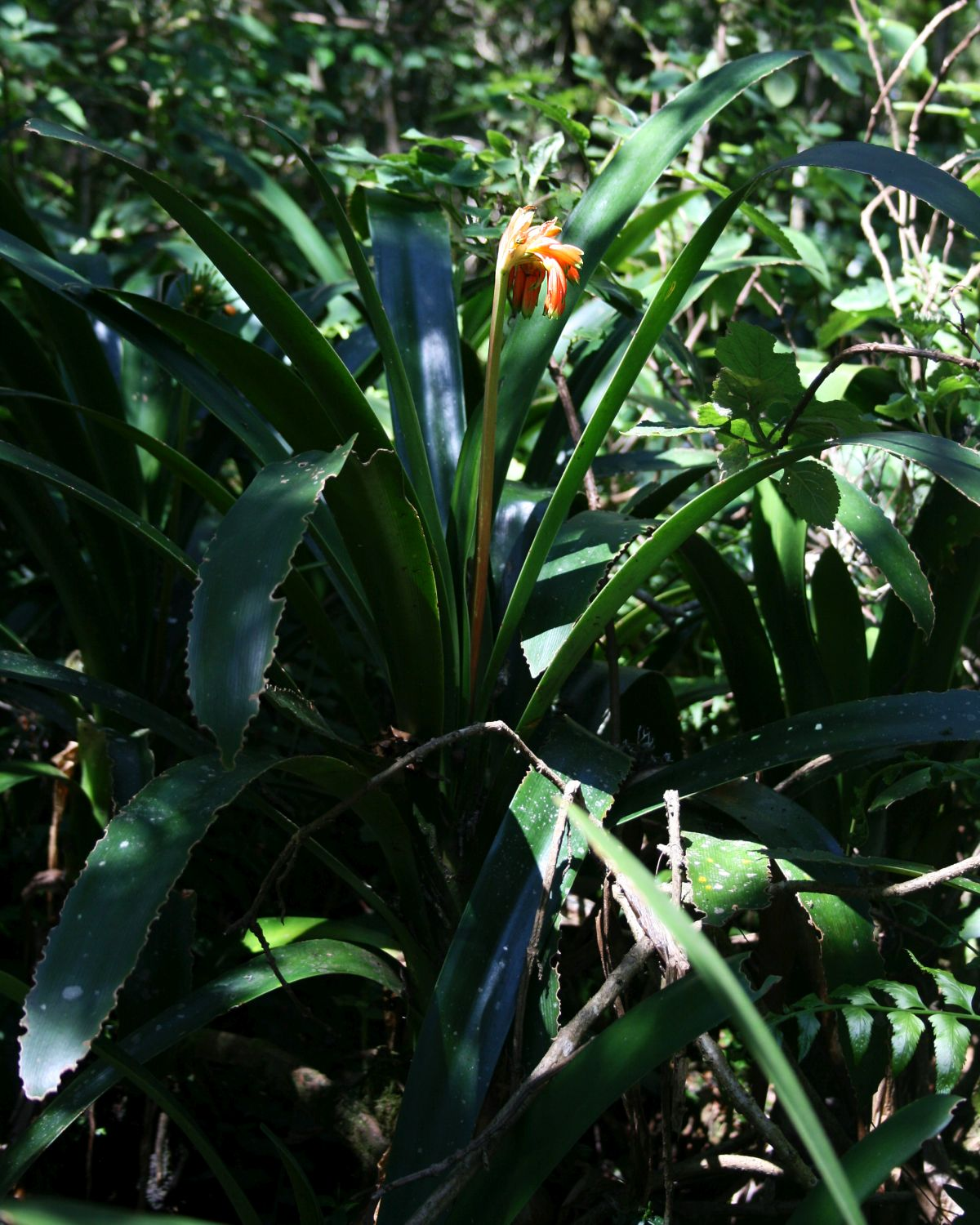

Conservation status
- Near Threatened (SANBI Red List)

Scientific classification
- Kingdom: Plantae
- Clade: Tracheophytes
- Clade: Angiosperms
- Clade: Monocots
- Order: Asparagales
- Family: Amaryllidaceae
- Subfamily: Amaryllidoideae
- Genus: Clivia
- Species: C. caulescens

Binomial name
- Clivia caulescens R.A.Dyer, (1943)

= Clivia caulescens =

Species of flowering plant

Clivia caulescens is a plant and geophyte belonging to the genus Clivia. The species occurs in Eswatini, Mpumalanga and Limpopo. The plant is threatened by its excessive use by traditional healers as well as its collection by horticulturalists. It is expected that the plant's numbers will decrease by 25% over the next 60 years.

It can be variegated.
