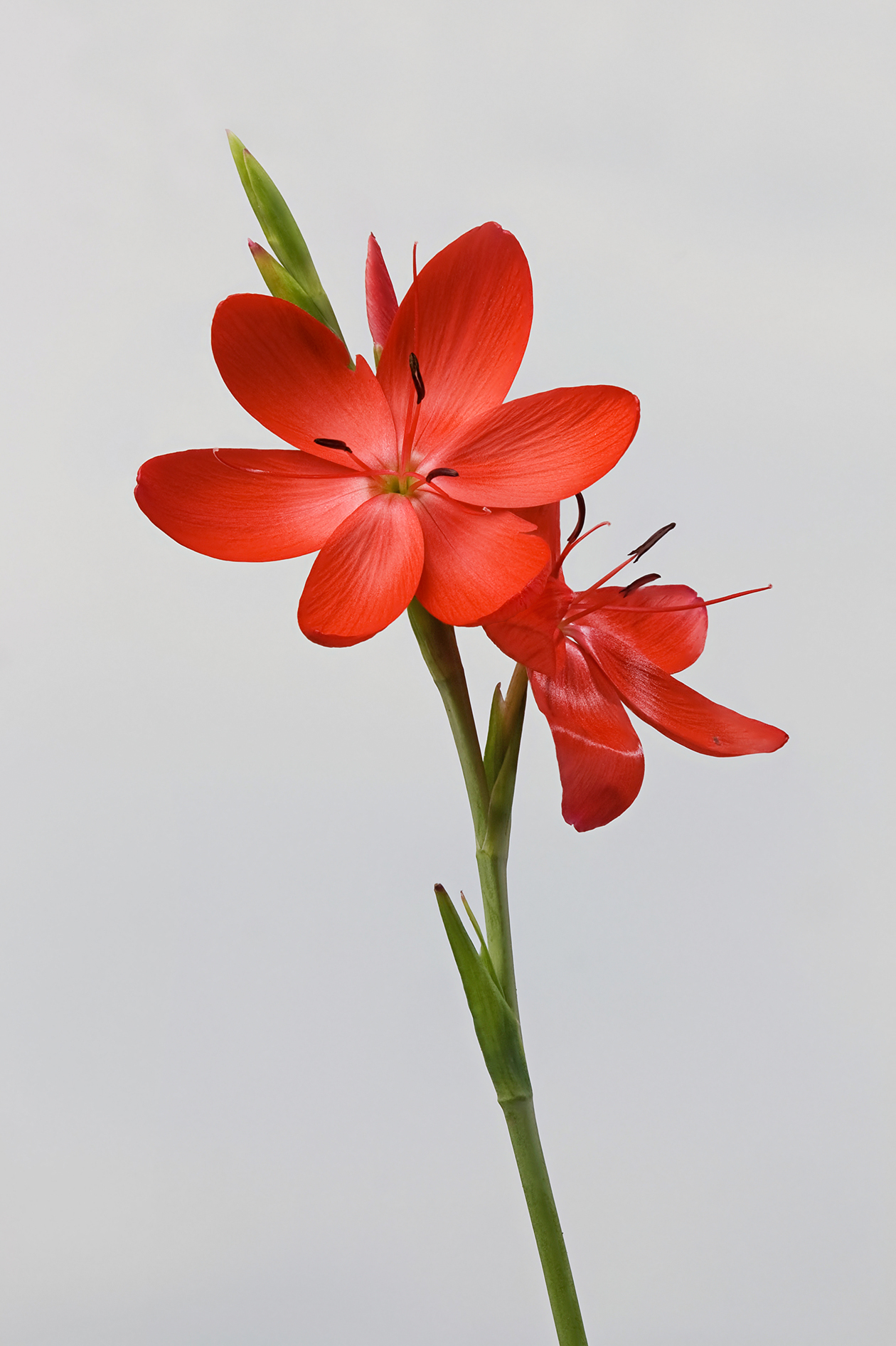
- Hesperantha coccinea

Scientific classification
- Kingdom: Plantae
- Clade: Tracheophytes
- Clade: Angiosperms
- Clade: Monocots
- Order: Asparagales
- Family: Iridaceae
- Subfamily: Crocoideae
- Tribe: Croceae
- Genus: Hesperantha; Ker Gawl.

Type species
- Hesperantha falcata (L.f.) Ker Gawl.

Synonyms
- Hesperanthus Salisb.; Schizostylis Backh. & Harv.

= Hesperantha =

Genus of flowering plants

Hesperantha is a genus of cormous flowering plants in the family Iridaceae. The genus name is derived from the Greek words hesperos, meaning "evening", and anthos, meaning "flower".

There are approximately 79 species, mostly native to southern Africa, but with four species reaching tropical Africa. All except one grow from corms.

The synonym Schizostylis is widely used in British horticulture for the single rhizomatous species S. coccinea, widely cultivated as a garden flower, and with numerous cultivars. Common names include scarlet river lily, kaffir lily and crimson flag.

== Species ==
- Hesperantha acuta (Licht. ex Roem. & Schult.) Ker Gawl.
- Hesperantha alborosea Hilliard & B.L.Burtt
- Hesperantha altimontana Goldblatt
- Hesperantha bachmannii Baker
- Hesperantha ballii Willd.
- Hesperantha baurii Baker
- Hesperantha bifolia Baker
- Hesperantha brevicaulis (Baker) G.J.Lewis
- Hesperantha brevifolia Goldblatt
- Hesperantha brevistyla Goldblatt
- Hesperantha bulbifera Baker
- Hesperantha candida Baker
- Hesperantha cedarmontana Goldblatt
- Hesperantha ciliolata Goldblatt
- Hesperantha cinnamomea (L.f.) Ker Gawl.
- Hesperantha coccinea (Backh. & Harv.) Goldblatt & J.C.Manning
- Hesperantha crocopsis Hilliard & B.L.Burtt
- Hesperantha cucullata Klatt
- Hesperantha curvula Hilliard & B.L.Burtt
- Hesperantha debilis Goldblatt
- Hesperantha decipiens Goldblatt
- Hesperantha dolomitica Goldblatt & J.C.Manning
- Hesperantha elsiae Goldblatt
- Hesperantha erecta (Baker) Benth. ex Baker
- Hesperantha eremophila Goldblatt & J.C.Manning
- Hesperantha exiliflora Goldblatt
- Hesperantha falcata (L.f.) Ker Gawl.
- Hesperantha fibrosa Baker
- Hesperantha filiformis Goldblatt & J.C.Manning
- Hesperantha flava G.J.Lewis
- Hesperantha flexuosa Klatt
- Hesperantha glabrescens Goldblatt
- Hesperantha glareosa Hilliard & B.L.Burtt
- Hesperantha gracilis Baker
- Hesperantha grandiflora G.J.Lewis
- Hesperantha hantamensis Schltr. ex R.C.Foster
- Hesperantha helmei Goldblatt & J.C.Manning
- Hesperantha humilis Baker
- Hesperantha hutchingsiae Hilliard & B.L.Burtt
- Hesperantha huttonii (Baker) Hilliard & B.L.Burtt
- Hesperantha hygrophila Hilliard & B.L.Burtt
- Hesperantha inconspicua (Baker) Goldblatt
- Hesperantha ingeliensis Hilliard & B.L.Burtt
- Hesperantha juncifolia Goldblatt
- Hesperantha karooica Goldblatt
- Hesperantha kiaratayloriae Goldblatt & J.C.Manning
- Hesperantha lactea Baker
- Hesperantha latifolia (Klatt) M.P.de Vos
- Hesperantha laxifolia Goldblatt & J.C.Manning
- Hesperantha leucantha Baker
- Hesperantha lithicola J.C.Manning & Goldblatt
- Hesperantha longicollis Baker
- Hesperantha longistyla J.C.Manning & Goldblatt
- Hesperantha longituba (Klatt) Baker
- Hesperantha luticola Goldblatt
- Hesperantha malvina Goldblatt
- Hesperantha marlothii R.C.Foster
- Hesperantha minima (Baker) R.C.Foster
- Hesperantha modesta Baker
- Hesperantha montigena Goldblatt
- Hesperantha mtamvunae Goldblatt & J.C.Manning
- Hesperantha muirii (L.Bolus) G.J.Lewis
- Hesperantha namaquana Goldblatt
- Hesperantha oligantha (Diels) Goldblatt
- Hesperantha pallescens Goldblatt
- Hesperantha palustris Goldblatt & J.C.Manning
- Hesperantha pauciflora (Baker) G.J.Lewis
- Hesperantha petitiana (A.Rich.) Baker
- Hesperantha pilosa (L.f.) Ker Gawl.
- Hesperantha pseudopilosa Goldblatt
- Hesperantha pubinervia Hilliard & B.L.Burtt
- Hesperantha pulchra Baker
- Hesperantha purpurea Goldblatt
- Hesperantha quadrangula Goldblatt
- Hesperantha radiata (Jacq.) Ker Gawl.
- Hesperantha rivulicola Goldblatt
- Hesperantha rupestris N.E.Br. ex R.C.Foster
- Hesperantha rupicola Goldblatt
- Hesperantha saldanhae Goldblatt
- Hesperantha saxicola Goldblatt
- Hesperantha schelpeana Hilliard & B.L.Burtt
- Hesperantha schlechteri (Baker) R.C.Foster
- Hesperantha scopulosa Hilliard & B.L.Burtt
- Hesperantha secunda Goldblatt & J.C.Manning
- Hesperantha spicata (Burm.f.) N.E.Br.
- Hesperantha stenosiphon Goldblatt
- Hesperantha sufflava Goldblatt
- Hesperantha teretifolia Goldblatt
- Hesperantha truncatula Goldblatt
- Hesperantha umbricola Goldblatt
- Hesperantha vaginata (Sweet) Goldblatt
- Hesperantha woodii Baker

== See also ==
- List of plants known as lily
