= Kafr, Iran =

Kafr كفر
- Village
- Location within Iran
- Coordinates: 29°43′30″N 53°15′36″E
- Country: Iran
- Province: Fars
- County: Arsanjan
- Bakhsh: Central
- Rural District: Shurab

Population (2006)
  - Total: 345
- Time zone: UTC+3:30 (IRST)
  - Summer (DST): UTC+4:30 (IRDT)

Kafr (Persian: كفر) is a village in Shurab Rural District, in the Central District of Arsanjan County, Fars province, Iran. At the 2006 census, its population was 345, in 77 families.
