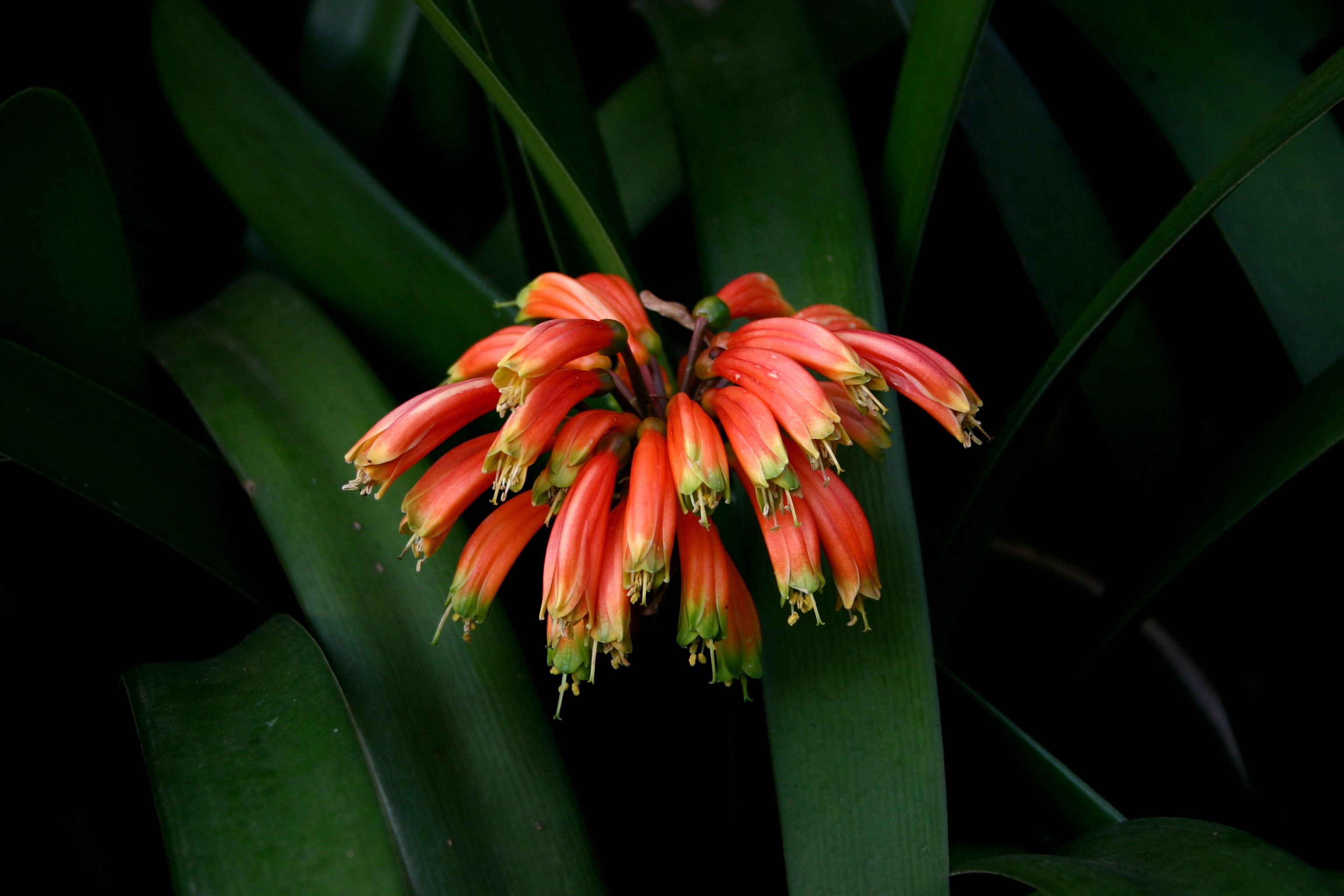

Scientific classification
- Kingdom: Plantae
- Clade: Tracheophytes
- Clade: Angiosperms
- Clade: Monocots
- Order: Asparagales
- Family: Amaryllidaceae
- Subfamily: Amaryllidoideae
- Genus: Clivia
- Species: C. nobilis

Binomial name
- Clivia nobilis Lindl.

Synonyms
- Haemanthus cernuiflorus J.Bell ex Drapiez; Imatophyllum aitonii Hook.; Imatophyllum maximum Guillon

= Clivia nobilis =

Species of flowering plant

Clivia nobilis, the green-tip forest lily, is a species of flowering plant in the genus Clivia, of the family Amaryllidaceae, native to the Eastern Cape Province of South Africa. It grows to about 38 cm (15 in). It has evergreen strap-shaped leaves, and bears pendent umbels of multiple narrow, trumpet-shaped, red and yellow flowers, tipped with green.

At a minimum temperature of 10 °C (50 °F), in temperate regions it is normally cultivated as a houseplant. Like its relative C. miniata It has gained the Royal Horticultural Society's Award of Garden Merit (confirmed 2017).

Charlotte Percy (née Clive), Duchess of Northumberland (1787–1866), governess of Queen Victoria, was the first to cultivate the plant in the United Kingdom and bring it to flower. The whole genus was subsequently named after the Duchess.

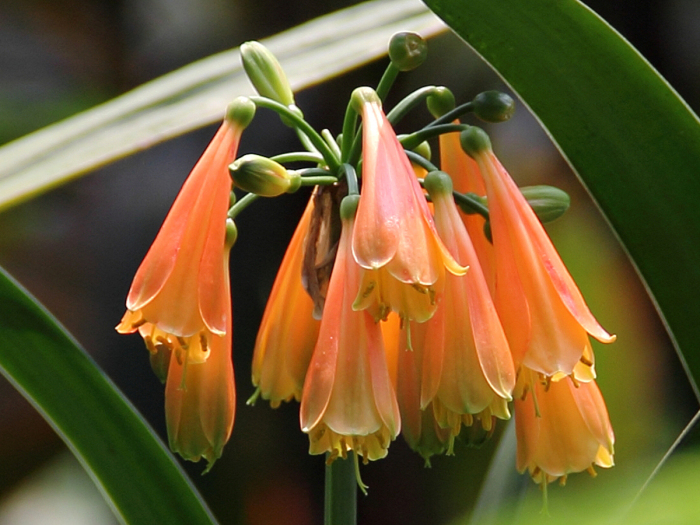
