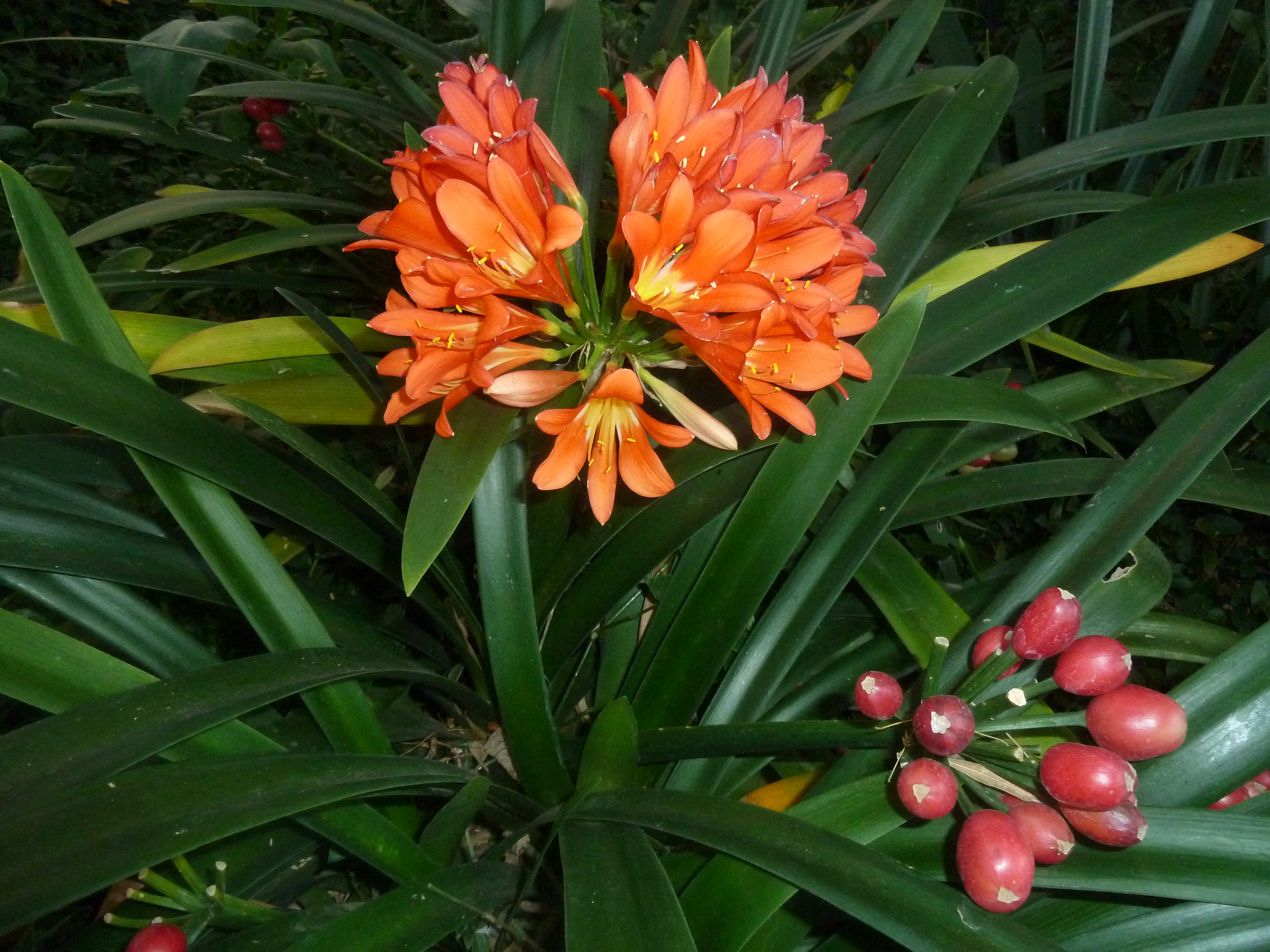

Scientific classification
- Kingdom: Plantae
- Clade: Tracheophytes
- Clade: Angiosperms
- Clade: Monocots
- Order: Asparagales
- Family: Amaryllidaceae
- Subfamily: Amaryllidoideae
- Genus: Clivia
- Species: C. miniata

Binomial name
- Clivia miniata (Lindl.) Verschaff.

Synonyms
- Clivia miniata var. citrina W.Watson; Clivia miniata var. flava E.Phillips; Clivia sulphurea Laing; Imantophyllum barkeri C.J.Barker; Imatophyllum atrosanguineum B.S.Williams; Imantophyllum miniatum (Lindl.) Hook.; Imatophyllum miniatum (Lindl.) Groenland; Imatophyllum miniatum var. maximum Van Houtte; Imatophyllum miniatum var. pictum W.Bull ex J.Dix; Imatophyllum miniatum vanhouttei Van Houtte; Imatophyllum vanhouttei (Van Houtte) Hovey; Vallota miniata Lindl. (1854) (basionym)

= Clivia miniata =

Species of flowering plant

Clivia miniata, the Natal lily or bush lily, is a species of flowering plant in the genus Clivia of the family Amaryllidaceae, native to woodland habitats in South Africa (Eastern Cape, Mpumalanga and KwaZulu-Natal provinces) and Eswatini. It is also widely cultivated as an ornamental.

== Description ==
Clivia miniata has a fleshy, mostly underground stem (rhizome) to 2 cm (1 in) in diameter, with numerous fleshy roots. The stem produces long, arching, strap-like leaves growing to about 45 cm (18 in) long, arranged in two opposing rows (distichous). The showy, funnel-shaped flowers are produced in an umbel-shaped inflorescence, colored red, orange or yellow, sometimes with a faint, but very sweet perfume. The fruit is a bright-red spherical berry to 5 cm (2 in) in diameter, producing one to a few seeds.

It is sometimes known in cultivation as "Kaffir lily" (a term considered extremely offensive in South Africa). The same derogatory name is also applied to the genus Hesperantha (formerly Schizostylis).

It contains small amounts of lycorine, making it poisonous.

The genus Clivia, was named after the Duchess of Northumberland, Lady Charlotte Clive, who first cultivated the plant in England and provided the flowers for the type specimen. The Latin specific epithet miniata means “cinnabar", the color of red lead, referring to the flowers.

== Cultivation ==
In cooler or temperate regions, C. miniata is normally cultivated as a houseplant. Within US hardiness zones 9–11, or anywhere where frost is not a threat, it may be grown in the ground outdoors, year-round, provided the average temperature is between 5 °C (41 °F) to 29 °C (84 °F). Like its relative, C. nobilis, it has gained the Royal Horticultural Society's Award of Garden Merit, along with the variety C. miniata var. citrina (confirmed 2017). In warmer sites, it is frequently seen in public installations and is used in shaded landscapes for its attractive, evergreen foliage and showy sprays of flowers. This clump-forming plant spreads via rhizomes, and is naturally well-suited for tranquil, protected spaces.

Cultivars include Clivia miniata 'Kirstenbosch Splendour', bred by Graham Duncan, which illustrates the cover of the Kirstenbosch centenary book (2013).

== Gallery ==
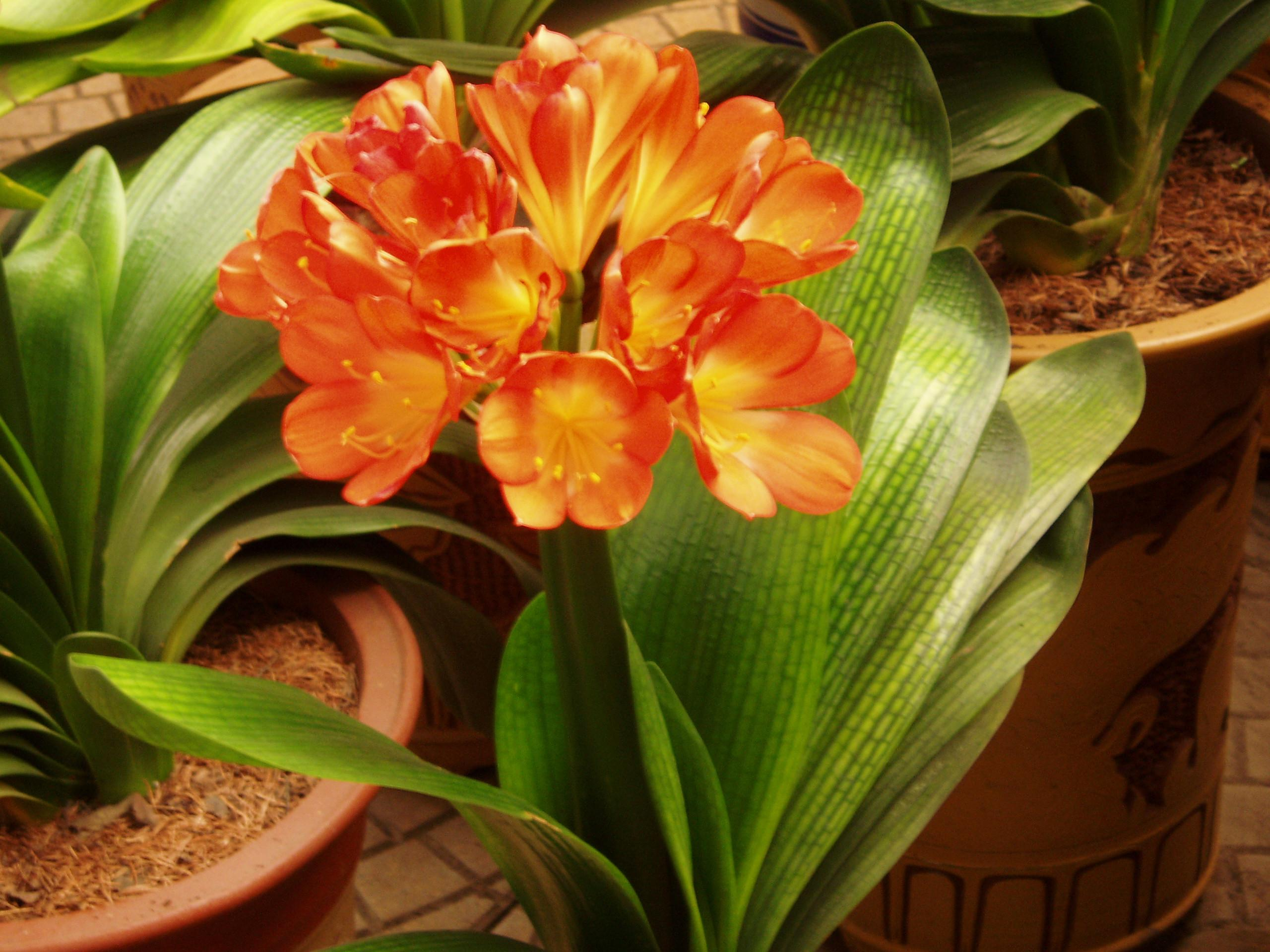

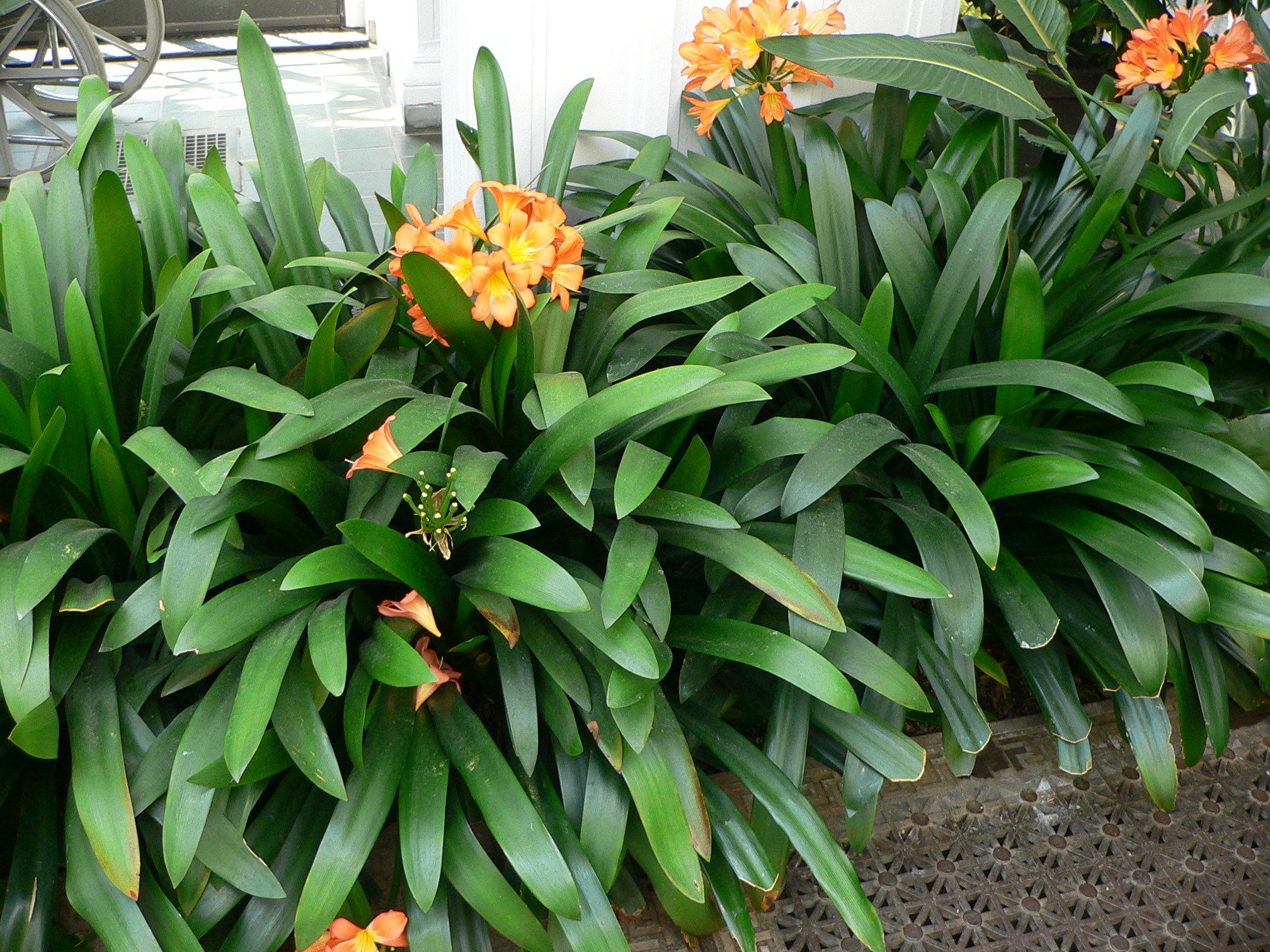
Showing off abundant foliage

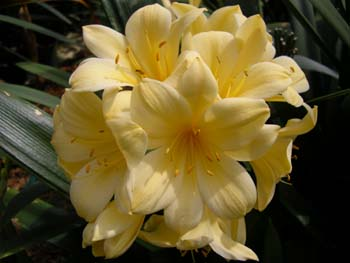
Clivia miniata var. citrina

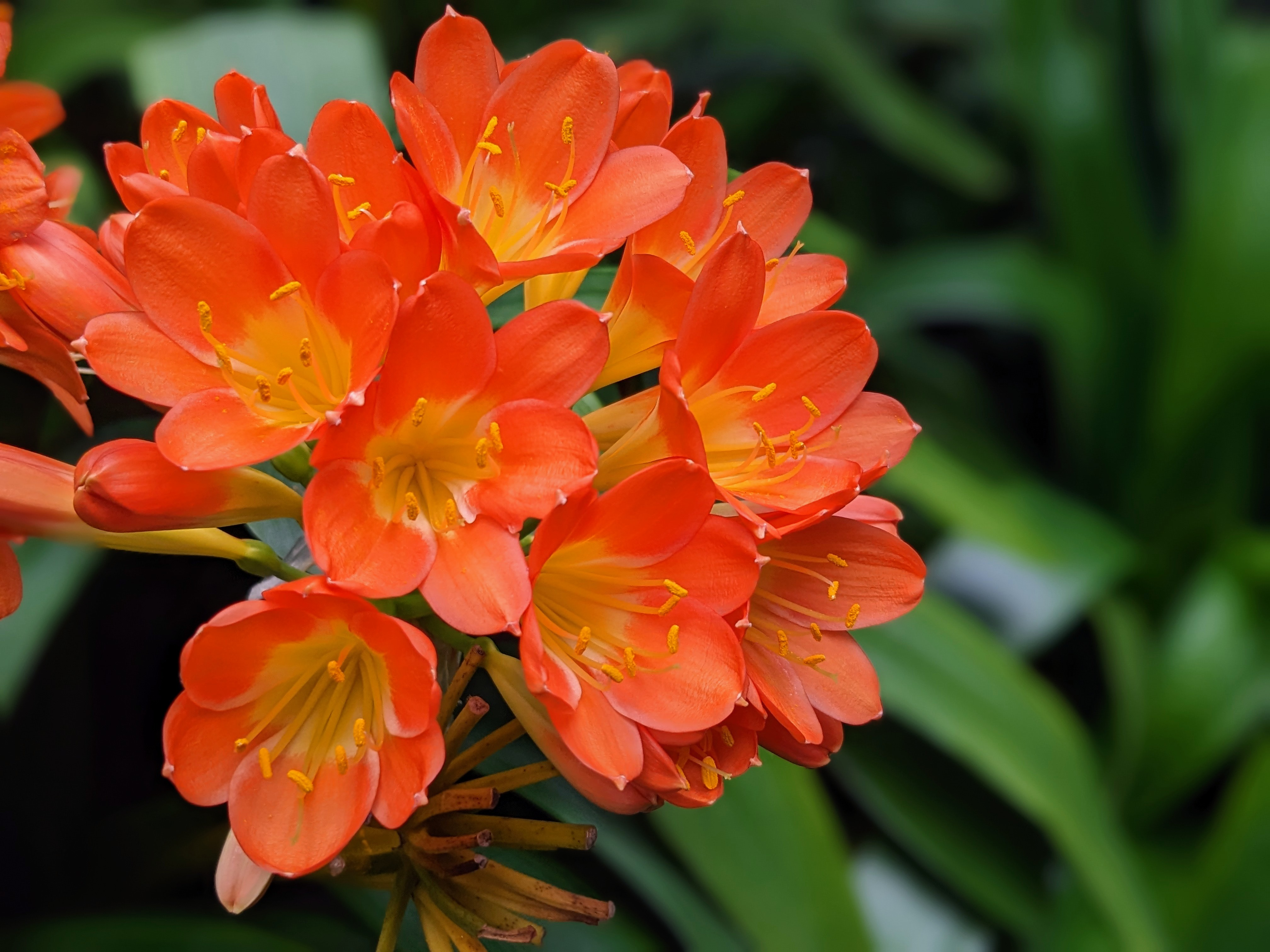

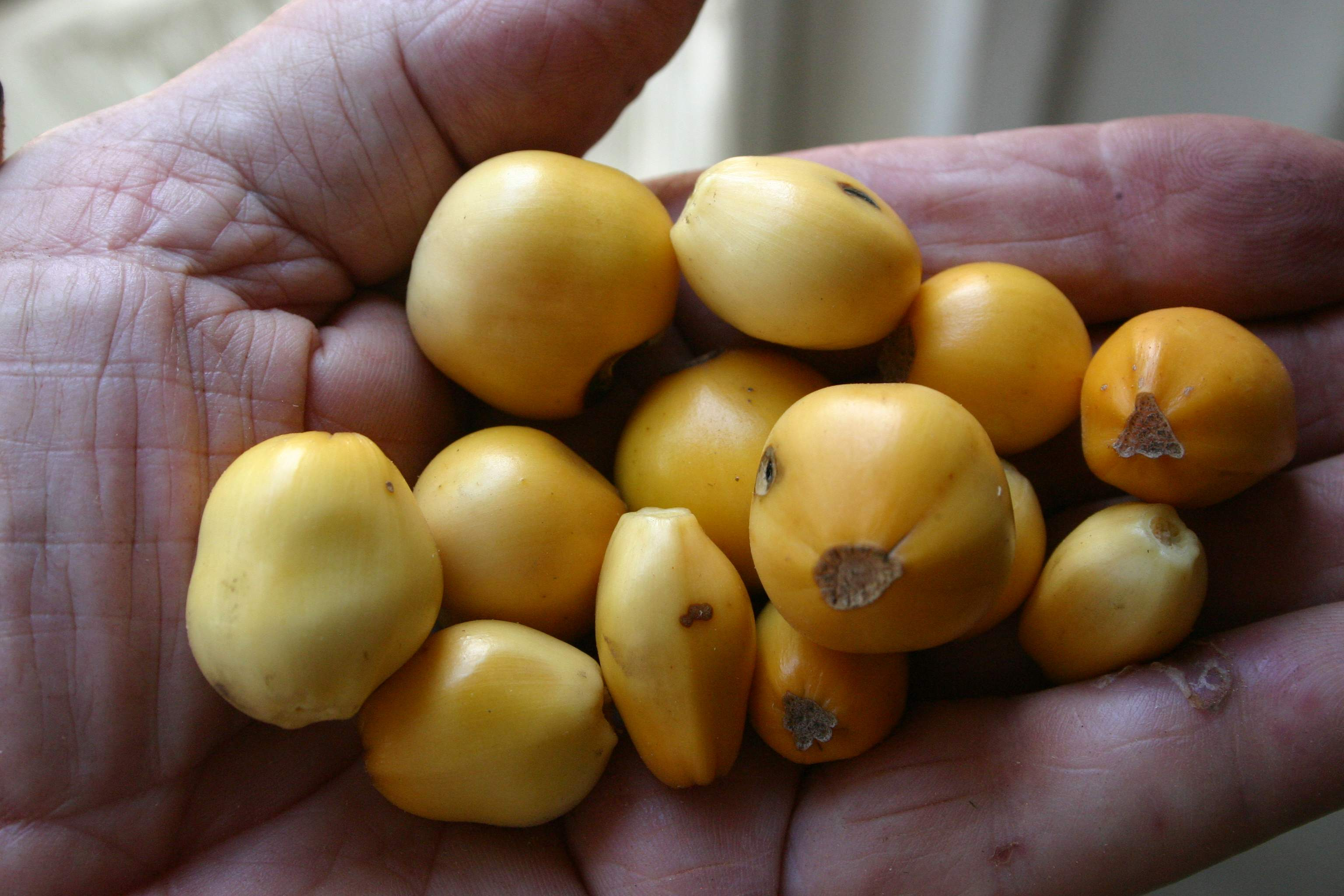
Clivia miniata var. citrina fruit

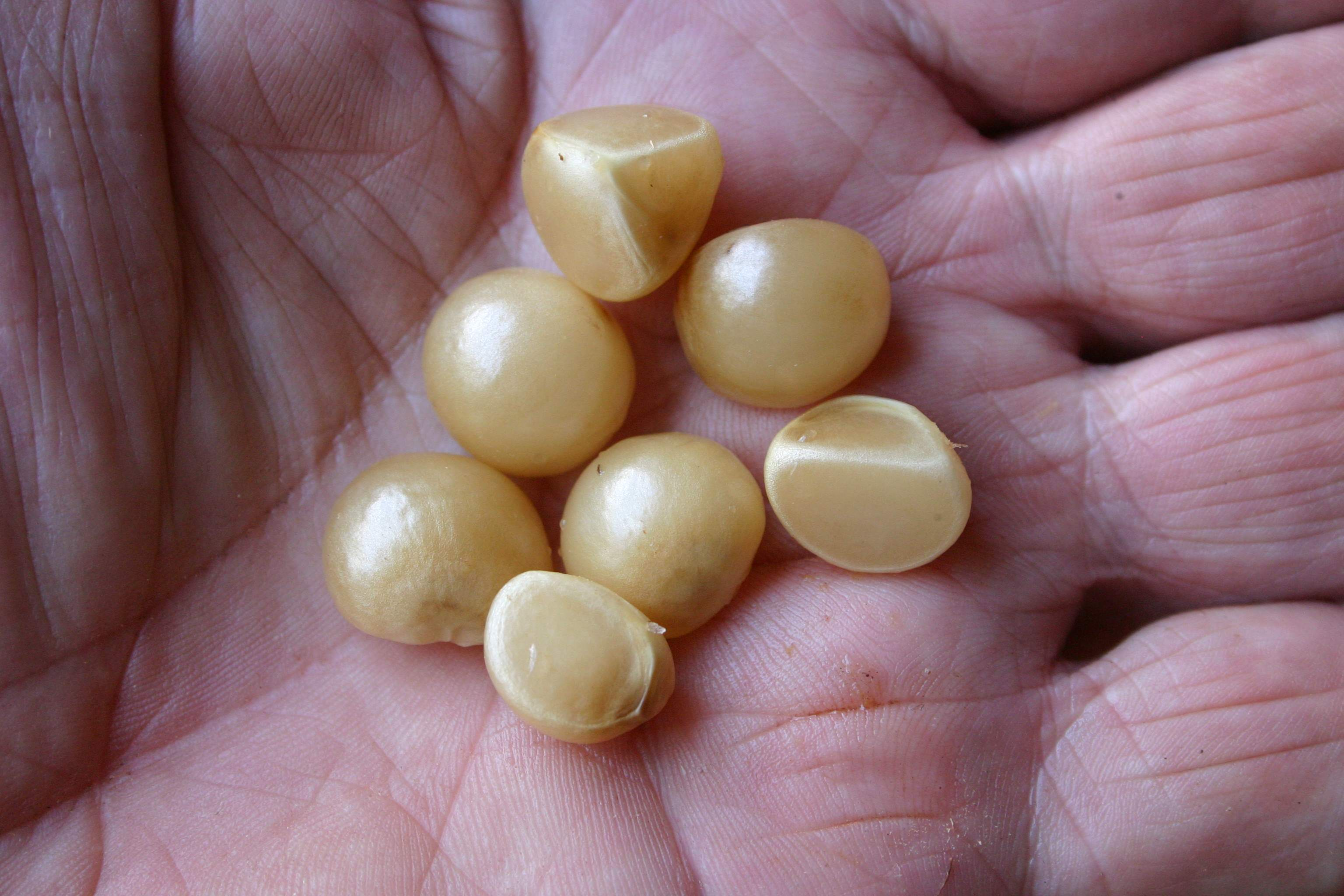
Clivia miniata var. citrina seed

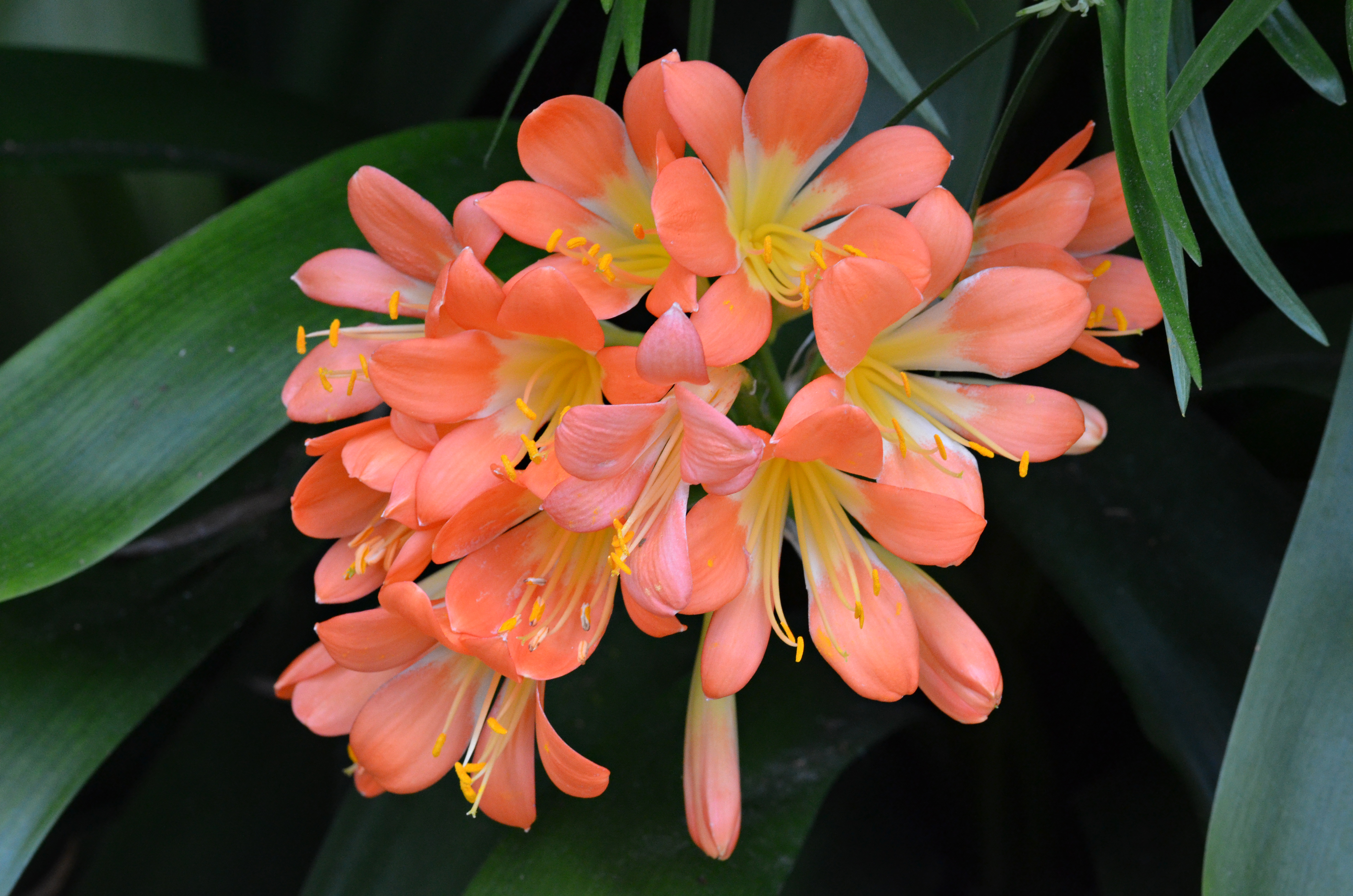
Orange flowered form

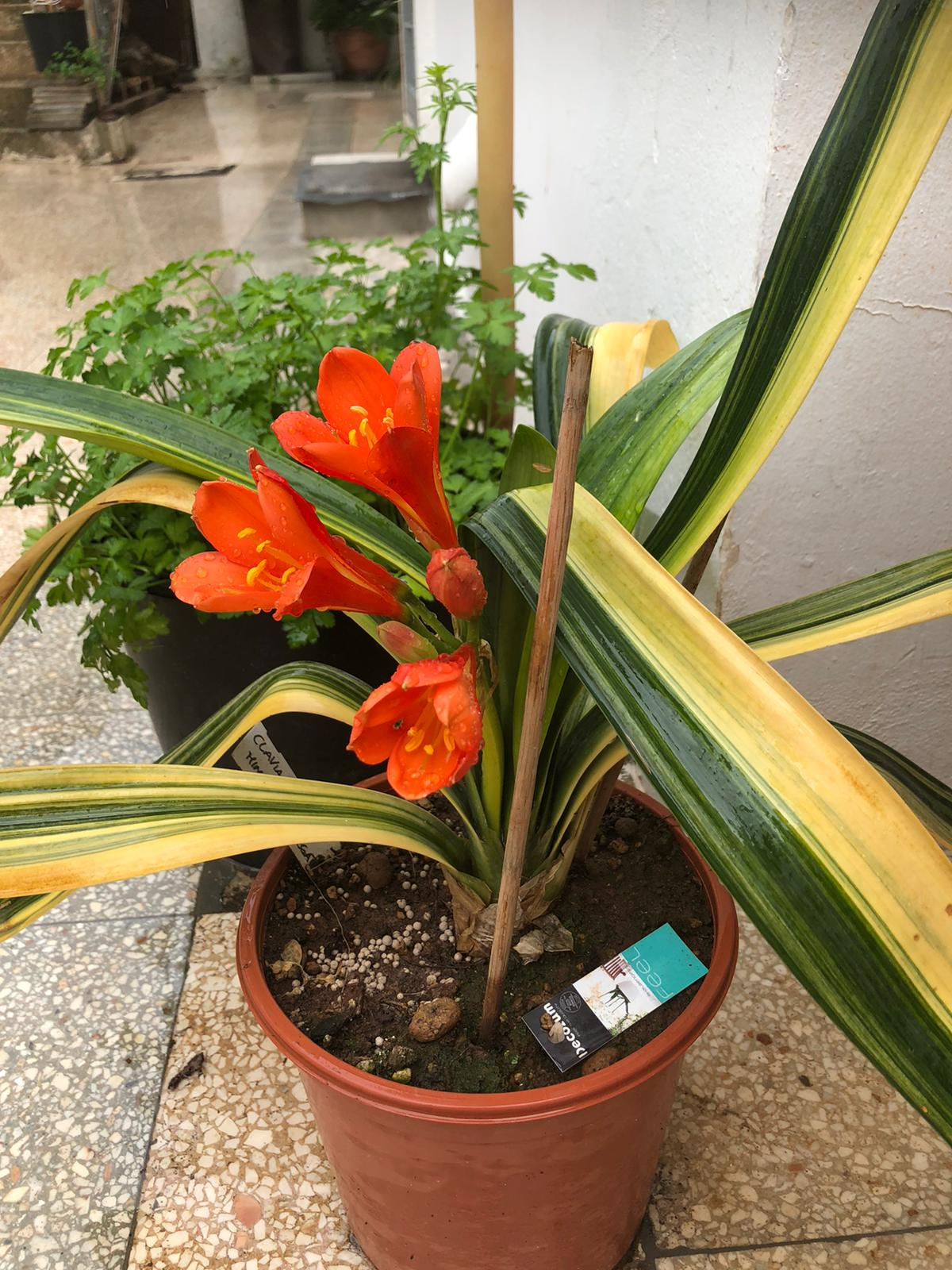
Variegated leaves

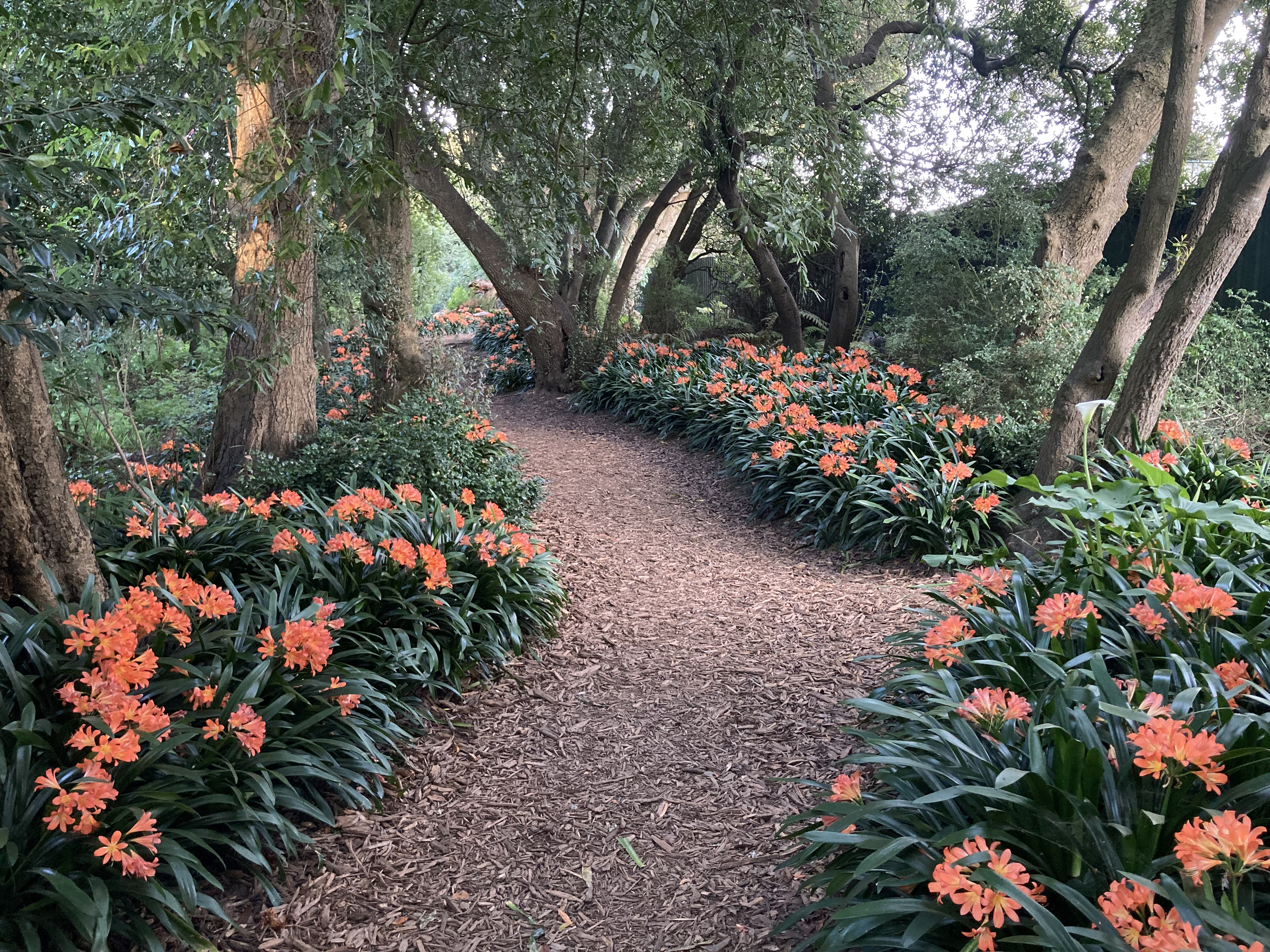
Clivia miniata growing in Golden Gate Park.

== See also ==
- List of poisonous plants
- List of plants known as lily

== Bibliography ==
- Hartigh, Wilma den (17 January 2013). "Kirstenbosch celebrated in print". Media Club South Africa. Archived from the original on 17 November 2016.
