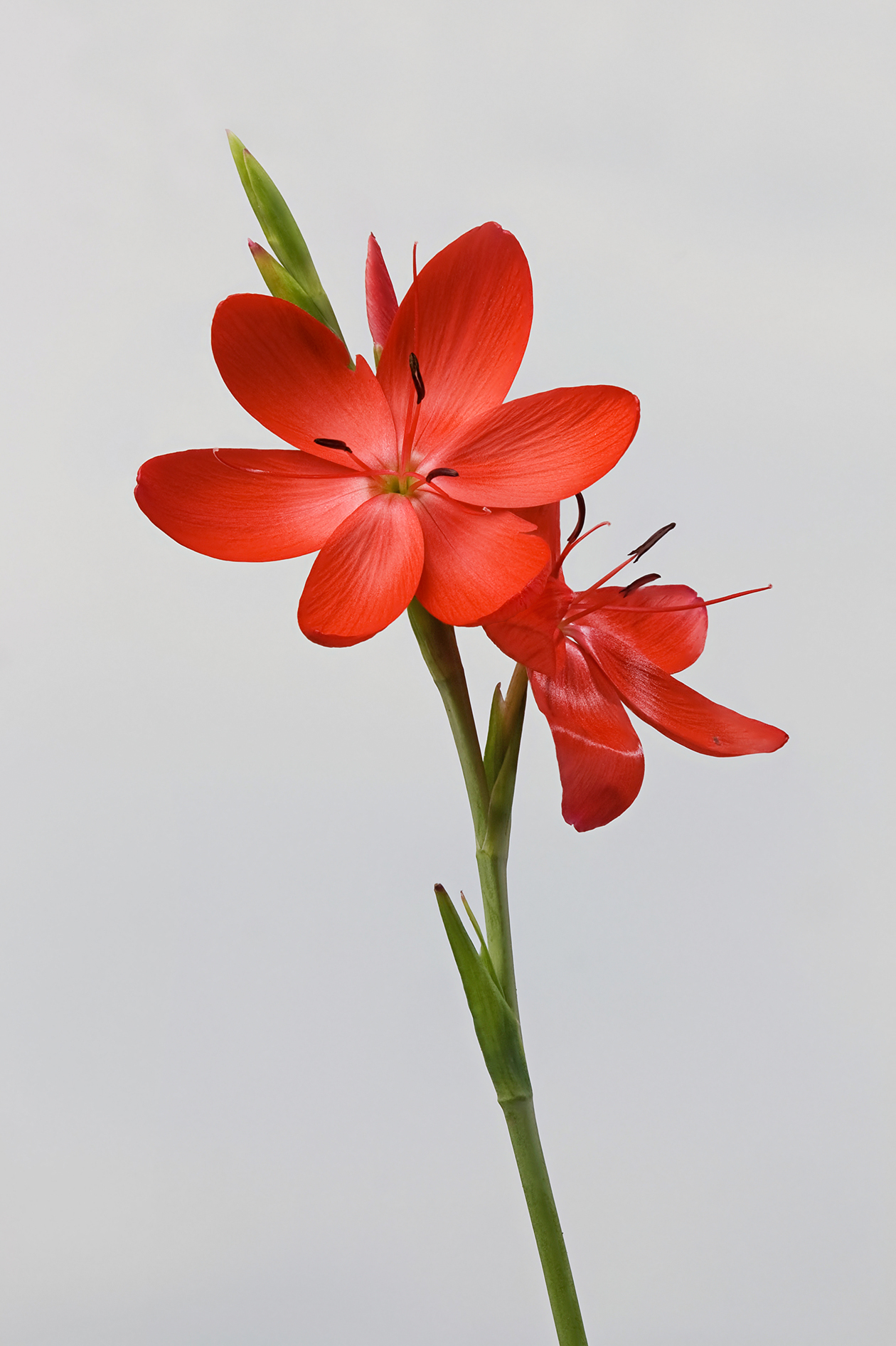

Scientific classification
- Kingdom: Plantae
- Clade: Tracheophytes
- Clade: Angiosperms
- Clade: Monocots
- Order: Asparagales
- Family: Iridaceae
- Genus: Hesperantha
- Species: H. coccinea

Binomial name
- Hesperantha coccinea (Backh. & Harv.) Goldblatt & J.C.Manning

Synonyms
- Schizostylis coccinea Backh. & Harv.; Schizostylis ixioides Harv. ex Baker; Schizostylis pauciflora Klatt

= Hesperantha coccinea =

Species of flowering plant

Hesperantha coccinea, the river lily, or crimson flag lily, synonym Schizostylis coccinea, is a species of flowering plant in the iris family Iridaceae, native to Southern Africa and Zimbabwe. It is a semievergreen perennial growing to 60 cm (24 in) tall, with slender lanceolate leaves up to 40 cm (16 in) long and 1 cm (0.4 in) broad. The flowers are red, occasionally pink or white, 30–35 mm long, with six petals; they are produced four to ten alternately on a spike in late summer to autumn.

The Latin specific epithet coccinea means “bright red”.

== Cultivation ==
Hesperantha coccinea is cultivated as an ornamental plant in gardens for its flowers, It is often used in floristry. Hardy down to between −5 and −10 °C (23 and 14 °F), in colder regions it is grown under glass. It was formerly known in cultivation as "Kaffir lily", and is still occasionally referenced as such. However, "Kaffir" is now regarded as an offensive ethnic slur.

Numerous cultivars are available, of which the following have gained the Royal Horticultural Society's Award of Garden Merit:-

- 'Jennifer' (mid-pink)
- 'Major' (scarlet)
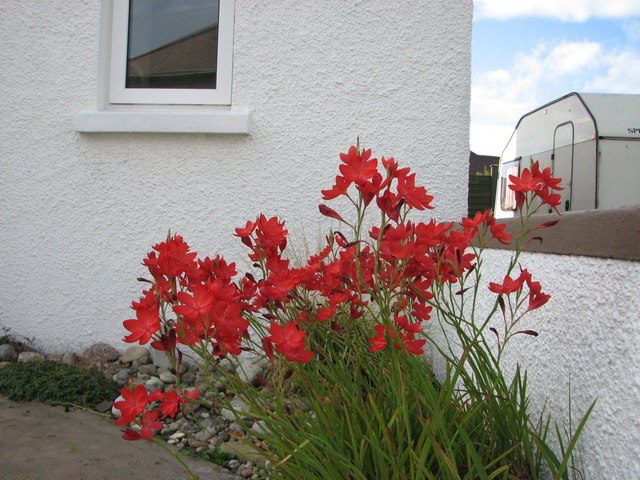
- 'Sunrise' (salmon pink)
- 'Wilfred H. Bryant' (blush pink)

== See also ==
- List of plants known as lily
