= Stenomesseae =

Stenomesseae was a tribe (in the family Amaryllidaceae, subfamily Amaryllidoideae), where it forms part of the Andean clade, one of two American clades. The tribe was originally described by Traub in his monograph on the Amaryllidaceae in 1963, as Stenomessae based on the type genus Stenomesson. In 1995 it was recognised that Eustephieae was a distinct group separate from the other Stenomesseae. Subsequently, the Müller-Doblies' (1996) divided tribe Eustephieae into two subtribes, Stenomessinae and Eustephiinae.

The advent of molecular phylogenetics showed that the Stemomesseae (including Stenomesson) was polyphyletic. Consequently, a separate tribe (Clinantheae) was created from one group and the remainder, which segregated with Eucharideae was treated as another tribe. Initially it was suggested that this combined tribe be referred to as a newly circumscribed Stenomesseae, but subsequently the term Eucharideae has been conserved.

== Taxonomy ==
=== Phylogeny ===
The placement of Stenomesseae, now Eucharideae within subfamily Amaryllidoideae is shown in the following cladogram.

Cladogram: Tribes of subfamily Amaryllidoideae

- Subfamily Amaryllidoideae
  - Africa
    Tribe Amaryllideae
  - - - Africa
        Tribe Cyrtantheae
      - - Africa
          Tribe Haemantheae
        - Australasia
          Tribe Calostemmateae
    - - Eurasian clade
        - Asia
          Tribe Lycorideae
        - Mediterranean
          - Tribe Galantheae
          - - Tribe Pancratieae
            - Tribe Narcisseae
      - American clade
        - Hippeastroid clade
          - Tribe Griffineae
          - Tribe Hippeastreae
        - Andean clade
          - - Tribe Eustephieae
          - - Tribe Stenomesseae/Eucharideae
            - - - Tribe Clinantheae
                - Tribe Hymenocallideae

== Bibliography ==
- Meerow, Alan. Towards a phylogeny of the Amaryllidaceae. pp. 169–179., in Rudall et al. (1995)
- Müller-Doblies, U.; Müller-Doblies, D. (1996). "Tribes and subtribes and some species combinations in Amaryllidaceae J St Hil R Dahlgren & al. 1985". Feddes Repertorium. 107 (5–6): S.c.1–S.c.9.
- Meerow, AW; Snijman, DA (1998). Flowering Plants · Monocotyledons. pp. 83–110. doi:10.1007/978-3-662-03533-7_11. ISBN 978-3-642-08377-8. S2CID 240114483., in Kubitzki (1998). (additional excerpts)
- Meerow, Alan W.; Snijman, Deirdre A. (2006). "The never-ending story: multigene approaches to the phylogeny of Amaryllidaceae". Aliso. 22: 355–366. doi:10.5642/aliso.20062201.29.
- Vigneron, Pascal (2008). "Amaryllidaceae". Amaryllidaceae.org (in French).
- Stevens, P.F. (2001–2012), Angiosperm Phylogeny Website: Amaryllidoideae
- Rudall, P.J.; Cribb, P.J.; Cutler, D.F.; Humphries, C.J., eds. (1995). Monocotyledons: systematics and evolution (Proceedings of the International Symposium on Monocotyledons: Systematics and Evolution, Kew 1993). Kew: Royal Botanic Gardens. ISBN 978-0-947643-85-0.
- Kubitzki, K., ed. (1998). The families and genera of vascular plants. Vol.3. Berlin, Germany: Springer-Verlag. ISBN 978-3-540-64060-8.
- Meerow, A.W.; Fay, M.F.; Guy, C.L.; Li, Q.-B.; Zaman, F.Q.; Chase, M.W. (1999). "Systematics of Amaryllidaceae based on cladistic analysis of plastid rbcL and trnL-F sequence data". Am. J. Bot. 86 (9): 1325–1345. doi:10.2307/2656780. JSTOR 2656780. PMID 10487820.
- Meerow, A.W.; Guy, C.L.; Li, Q.-B.; Yang, S.-L. (2000). "Phylogeny of the American Amaryllidaceae Based on nrDNA ITS Sequences" (PDF). Systematic Botany. 25 (4): 708–726. doi:10.2307/2666729. JSTOR 2666729. S2CID 20392462.
- Traub, H.P. (1963). Genera of the Amaryllidaceae. Genera of organisms. La Jolla, California: American Plant Life Society.
- Meerow, Alan. Convergence or Reticulation? Mosaic Evolution in the Canalized American Amaryllidaceae. pp. 145–168., in Seberg et al (2010)
- Seberg, Ole; Petersen, Gitte; Barfod, Anders; Davis, Jerrold I., eds. (2010). Diversity, phylogeny, and evolution in the Monocotyledons: proceedings of the Fourth International Conference on the Comparative Biology of the Monocotyledons and the Fifth International Symposium on Grass Systematics and Evolution. Århus: Aarhus University Press. ISBN 978-87-7934-398-6.
- "Amaryllidaceae: A taxonomic tool for the Amaryllidaceae of the world". eMonocot.
