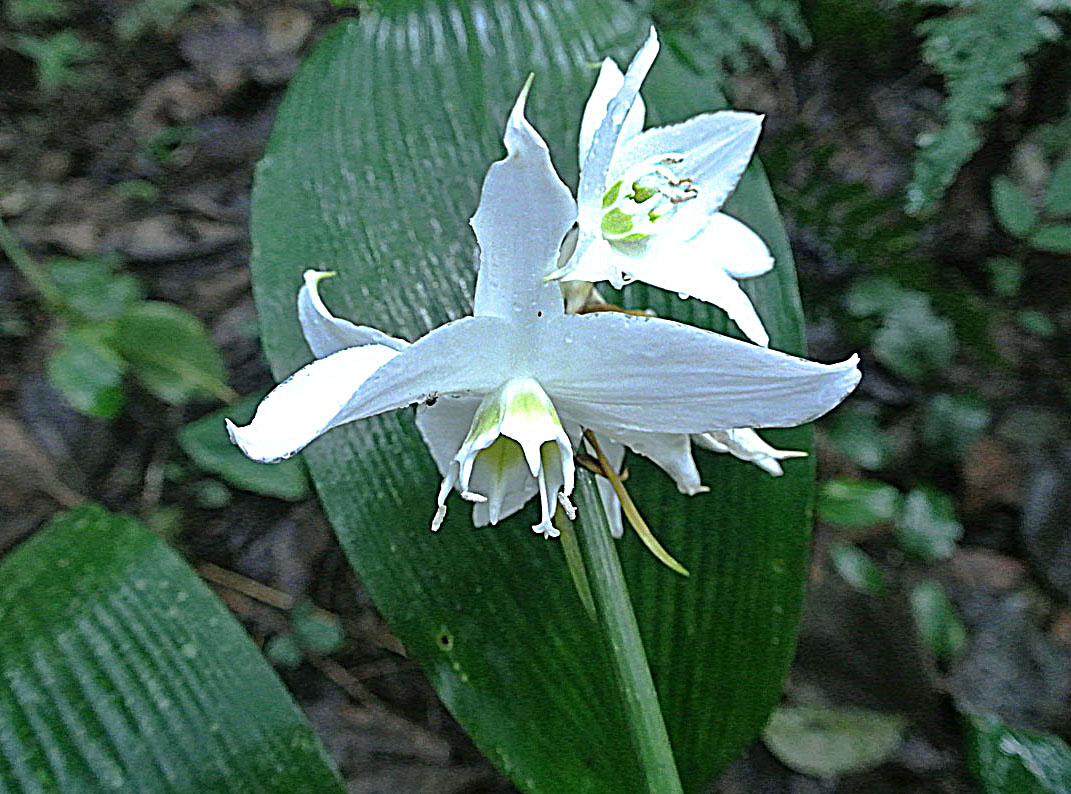
- Urceolina candida

Scientific classification
- Kingdom: Plantae
- Clade: Tracheophytes
- Clade: Angiosperms
- Clade: Monocots
- Order: Asparagales
- Family: Amaryllidaceae
- Subfamily: Amaryllidoideae
- Tribe: Eucharideae; Hutch.

Type genus
- Eucharis (now a synonym of Urceolina) Planch. & Linden

Genera
- See text

Synonyms
- Euchareae Traub

= Eucharideae =

Tribe of flowering plants

Eucharideae is a tribe of plants within the family Amaryllidaceae. It was augmented in 2000 by Meerow et al. following a molecular phylogenetic study that revealed that many elements of the tribe Stenomesseae segregated with it, rather than separately, and were subsequently submerged in it (although there was an initial proposal to rename this clade Stenomesseae). Further revisions were made in 2020, when three genera were merged. It forms one of the tribes of the Andean subclade of the American clade of the subfamily.

== Taxonomy ==
In Traub's 1963 monograph on the Amaryllidaceae, he conceived of a tribe Euchareae based on the type genus, Eucharis and constituted from six genera in total. In 1996, the Müller-Doblies deemed this to be polyphyletic, and redistributed the genera over three separate tribes, retaining Eucharideae as one of those tribes, but divided into two subtribes, Eucharidinae and Hymenocallidinae with a total of seven genera. In 1998, Meerow and Snijman considered these separate tribes, retaining only four genera in their Eucharideae. In 2000, the tribe was then considerably reconstituted following a deconstruction of tribe Stenomesseae based on molecular phylogenetics, resulting in seven genera (Plagiolirion was not included). However, relationships were not fully resolved.

=== Phylogeny ===
The placement of Eucharideae within subfamily Amaryllidoideae is shown in the following cladogram:

Cladogram: Tribes of subfamily Amaryllidoideae

- Subfamily Amaryllidoideae
  - Africa
    Tribe Amaryllideae
  - - - Africa
        Tribe Cyrtantheae
      - - Africa
          Tribe Haemantheae
        - Australasia
          Tribe Calostemmateae
    - - Eurasian clade
        - Asia
          Tribe Lycorideae
        - Mediterranean
          - Tribe Galantheae
          - - Tribe Pancratieae
            - Tribe Narcisseae
      - American clade
        - Hippeastroid clade
          - Tribe Griffineae
          - Tribe Hippeastreae
        - Andean clade
          - - Tribe Eustephieae
          - - Tribe Eucharideae/Stenomesseae
            - - - Tribe Clinantheae
                - Tribe Hymenocallideae

A 2020 molecular phylogenetic study showed that genera accepted in 2000 required further revision. A summary cladogram from the study combined Eucharis, Caliphruria and Urceolina in a single clade, as well as showing that two species were wrongly placed.

- Eucharideae
  - Rauhia
  - - Plagiolirion (Plagiolirion horsmannii)
    - - - Phaedranassa
        - Eucrosia
      - - Stenomesson (including Caliphruria korsakoffii)
        - Urceolina (including Eucharis, Caliphruria, Eucrosia dodsonii)

=== Genera ===
Genera accepted in the 2020 study are:

- Eucrosia Ker Gawl.
- Phaedranassa Herb.
- Plagiolirion Baker
- Rauhia Traub
- Stenomesson Herb.
- Urceolina Rchb. (including Eucharis and Caliphruria)

== Bibliography ==
- Traub, H.P. (1963). Genera of the Amaryllidaceae. La Jolla, California: American Plant Life Society. Archived from the original on 2018-10-01.
- Meerow, Alan. Towards a phylogeny of the Amaryllidaceae. pp. 169–179. In Rudall et al. (1995)
- Rudall, P.J.; Cribb, P.J.; Cutler, D.F.; Humphries, C.J., eds. (1995). Monocotyledons: systematics and evolution (Proceedings of the International Symposium on Monocotyledons: Systematics and Evolution, Kew 1993). Kew: Royal Botanic Gardens. ISBN 978-0-947643-85-0. Archived from the original on 5 January 2014.
- Müller-Doblies, U.; Müller-Doblies, D. (1996). "Tribes and subtribes and some species combinations in Amaryllidaceae J St Hil R Dahlgren & al. 1985". Feddes Repertorium. 107 (5–6): S.c.1–S.c.9.
- Meerow, AW; Snijman, DA (1998). Flowering Plants · Monocotyledons. pp. 83–110. doi:10.1007/978-3-662-03533-7_11. ISBN 978-3-642-08377-8. S2CID 240114483., in Kubitzki (1998). (additional excerpts)
- Kubitzki, K., ed. (1998). The families and genera of vascular plants. Vol.3. Berlin, Germany: Springer-Verlag. ISBN 978-3-540-64060-8.
- Meerow, A.W.; Fay, M.F.; Guy, C.L.; Li, Q.-B.; Zaman, F.Q.; Chase, M.W. (1999). "Systematics of Amaryllidaceae based on cladistic analysis of plastid rbcL and trnL-F sequence data". Am. J. Bot. 86 (9): 1325–1345. doi:10.2307/2656780. JSTOR 2656780. PMID 10487820.
- Meerow, A.W.; Guy, C.L.; Li, Q.-B.; Yang, S.-L. (2000). "Phylogeny of the American Amaryllidaceae Based on nrDNA ITS Sequences" (PDF). Systematic Botany. 25 (4): 708–726. doi:10.2307/2666729. JSTOR 2666729. S2CID 20392462. Archived from the original (PDF) on 2015-09-23.
- Meerow, Alan W.; Snijman, Deirdre A. (2006). "The never-ending story: multigene approaches to the phylogeny of Amaryllidaceae". Aliso. 22: 355–366. doi:10.5642/aliso.20062201.29.
- Vigneron, Pascal (2008). "Amaryllidaceae". Amaryllidaceae.org (in French). Archived from the original on 4 January 2015.
- Stevens, P.F. (2001–2012), Angiosperm Phylogeny Website: Amaryllidoideae
- "Amaryllidaceae: A taxonomic tool for the Amaryllidaceae of the world". eMonocot. Archived from the original on 2016-03-04.
- Meerow, Alan W.; Gardner, Elliot M.; Nakamura, Kyoko (2020). "Phylogenomics of the Andean Tetraploid Clade of the American Amaryllidaceae (Subfamily Amaryllidoideae): Unlocking a Polyploid Generic Radiation Abetted by Continental Geodynamics". Frontiers in Plant Science. 11 582422. doi:10.3389/fpls.2020.582422. ISSN 1664-462X. PMC 7674842. PMID 33250911.
