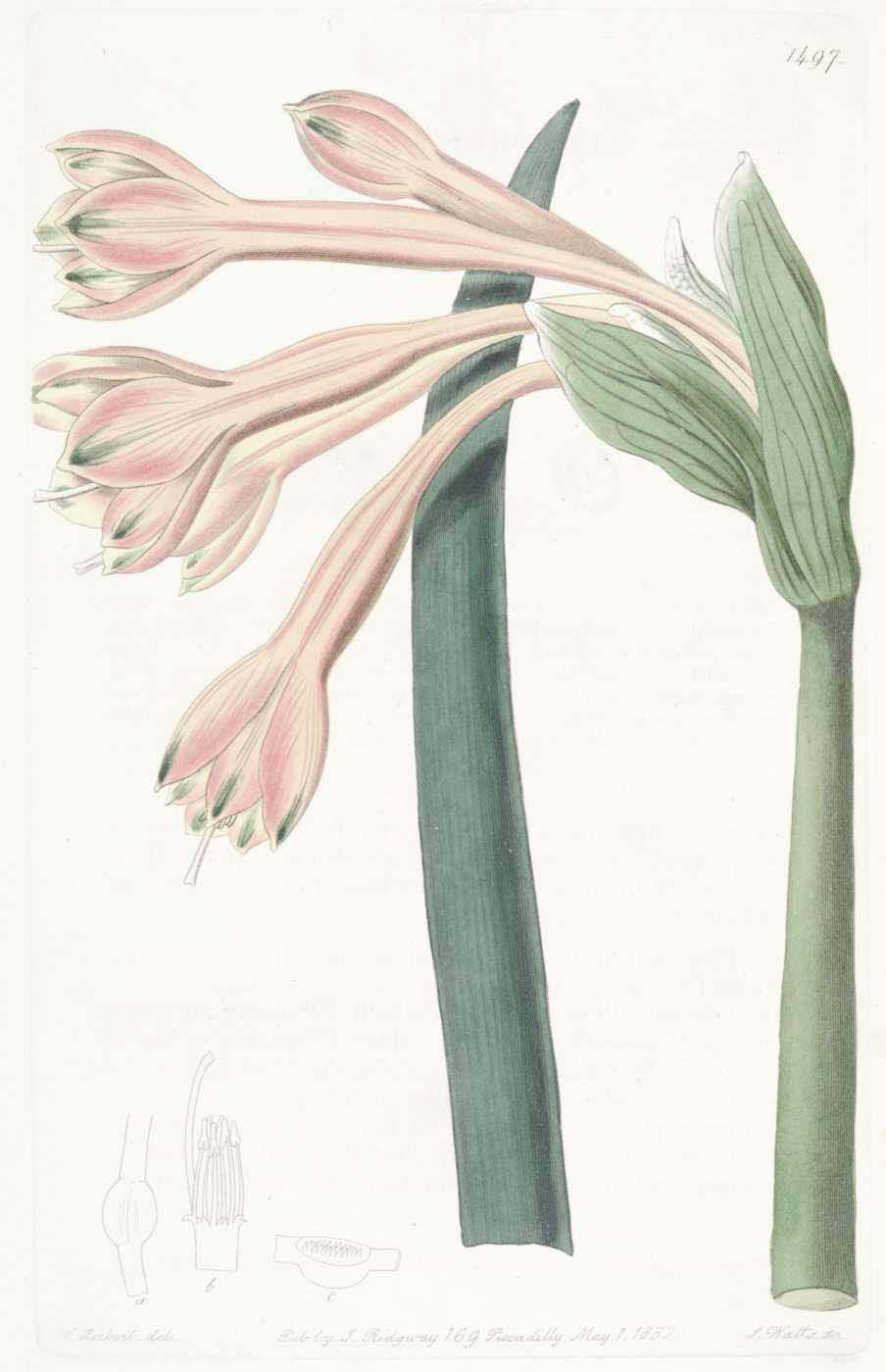
- Clinanthus fulvus

Scientific classification
- Kingdom: Plantae
- Clade: Tracheophytes
- Clade: Angiosperms
- Clade: Monocots
- Order: Asparagales
- Family: Amaryllidaceae
- Subfamily: Amaryllidoideae
- Tribe: Clinantheae; Meerow

Type genus
- Clinanthus Herb.

Genera
- See text

= Clinantheae =

Tribe of flowering plants

Clinantheae is a tribe (in the family Amaryllidaceae, subfamily Amaryllidoideae), where it forms part of the Andean clade, one of two American clades. The tribe was described in 2000 by Alan Meerow et al. as a result of a molecular phylogenetic study of the American Amaryllidoideae. This demonstrated that the tribe Stenomesseae, including the type genus Stenomesson was polyphyletic. Part of the tribe segregated with the Eucharideae and were submerged into it, while the other part formed a unique subclade. Since the type species of Stenomesson was not part of the second subclade, it was necessary to form a new name for the remaining species together with the other genera that remained. This was Clinanthus, the oldest name for these species, and consequently the tribe Clinantheae.

== Taxonomy ==
=== Phylogeny ===
The placement of Clinantheae within subfamily Amaryllidoideae is shown in the following cladogram, where this tribe is shown as a sister group to the Hymenocallideae.

Cladogram: Tribes of subfamily Amaryllidoideae

- Subfamily Amaryllidoideae
  - Africa
    Tribe Amaryllideae
  - - - Africa
        Tribe Cyrtantheae
      - - Africa
          Tribe Haemantheae
        - Australasia
          Tribe Calostemmateae
    - - Eurasian clade
        - Asia
          Tribe Lycorideae
        - Mediterranean
          - Tribe Galantheae
          - - Tribe Pancratieae
            - Tribe Narcisseae
      - American clade
        - Hippeastroid clade
          - Tribe Griffineae
          - Tribe Hippeastreae
        - Andean clade
          - - Tribe Eustephieae
          - - Tribe Eucharideae/Stenomesseae
            - - - Tribe Clinantheae
                - Tribe Hymenocallideae

=== Subdivision ===
The tribe Clinantheae Meerow consists of the following three genera:

- Clinanthus Herb.
- Paramongaia Velarde
- Pamianthe Stapf

== Bibliography ==
- Meerow, Alan. Towards a phylogeny of the Amaryllidaceae. pp. 169–179., in Rudall et al. (1995)
- Müller-Doblies, U.; Müller-Doblies, D. (1996). "Tribes and subtribes and some species combinations in Amaryllidaceae J St Hil R Dahlgren & al. 1985". Feddes Repertorium. 107 (5–6): S.c.1–S.c.9.
- Meerow, AW; Snijman, DA (1998). Flowering Plants · Monocotyledons. pp. 83–110. doi:10.1007/978-3-662-03533-7_11. ISBN 978-3-642-08377-8. S2CID 240114483., in Kubitzki (1998). (additional excerpts)
- Meerow, Alan W.; Snijman, Deirdre A. (2006). "The never-ending story: multigene approaches to the phylogeny of Amaryllidaceae". Aliso. 22: 355–366. doi:10.5642/aliso.20062201.29.
- Vigneron, Pascal (2008). "Amaryllidaceae". Amaryllidaceae.org (in French). Archived from the original on 4 January 2015.
- Stevens, P.F. (2001–2012), Angiosperm Phylogeny Website: Amaryllidoideae
- Rudall, P.J.; Cribb, P.J.; Cutler, D.F.; Humphries, C.J., eds. (1995). Monocotyledons: systematics and evolution (Proceedings of the International Symposium on Monocotyledons: Systematics and Evolution, Kew 1993). Kew: Royal Botanic Gardens. ISBN 978-0-947643-85-0.
- Kubitzki, K., ed. (1998). The families and genera of vascular plants. Vol.3. Berlin, Germany: Springer-Verlag. ISBN 978-3-540-64060-8.
- Meerow, A.W.; Fay, M.F.; Guy, C.L.; Li, Q.-B.; Zaman, F.Q.; Chase, M.W. (1999). "Systematics of Amaryllidaceae based on cladistic analysis of plastid rbcL and trnL-F sequence data". Am. J. Bot. 86 (9): 1325–1345. doi:10.2307/2656780. JSTOR 2656780. PMID 10487820.
- Meerow, A.W.; Guy, C.L.; Li, Q.-B.; Yang, S.-L. (2000). "Phylogeny of the American Amaryllidaceae Based on nrDNA ITS Sequences" (PDF). Systematic Botany. 25 (4): 708–726. doi:10.2307/2666729. JSTOR 2666729. S2CID 20392462. Archived from the original (PDF) on 23 September 2015.
- Meerow, Alan W.; van der Werff, Henk (1 July 2004). "Pucara (Amaryllidaceae) Reduced to Synonymy with Stenomesson on the Basis of Nuclear and Plastid DNA Spacer Sequences, and a New Related Species of Stenomesson". Systematic Botany. 29 (3): 511–517. doi:10.1600/0363644041744400. S2CID 85742067.
- "Amaryllidaceae: A taxonomic tool for the Amaryllidaceae of the world". eMonocot. Archived from the original on 2016-03-04.
