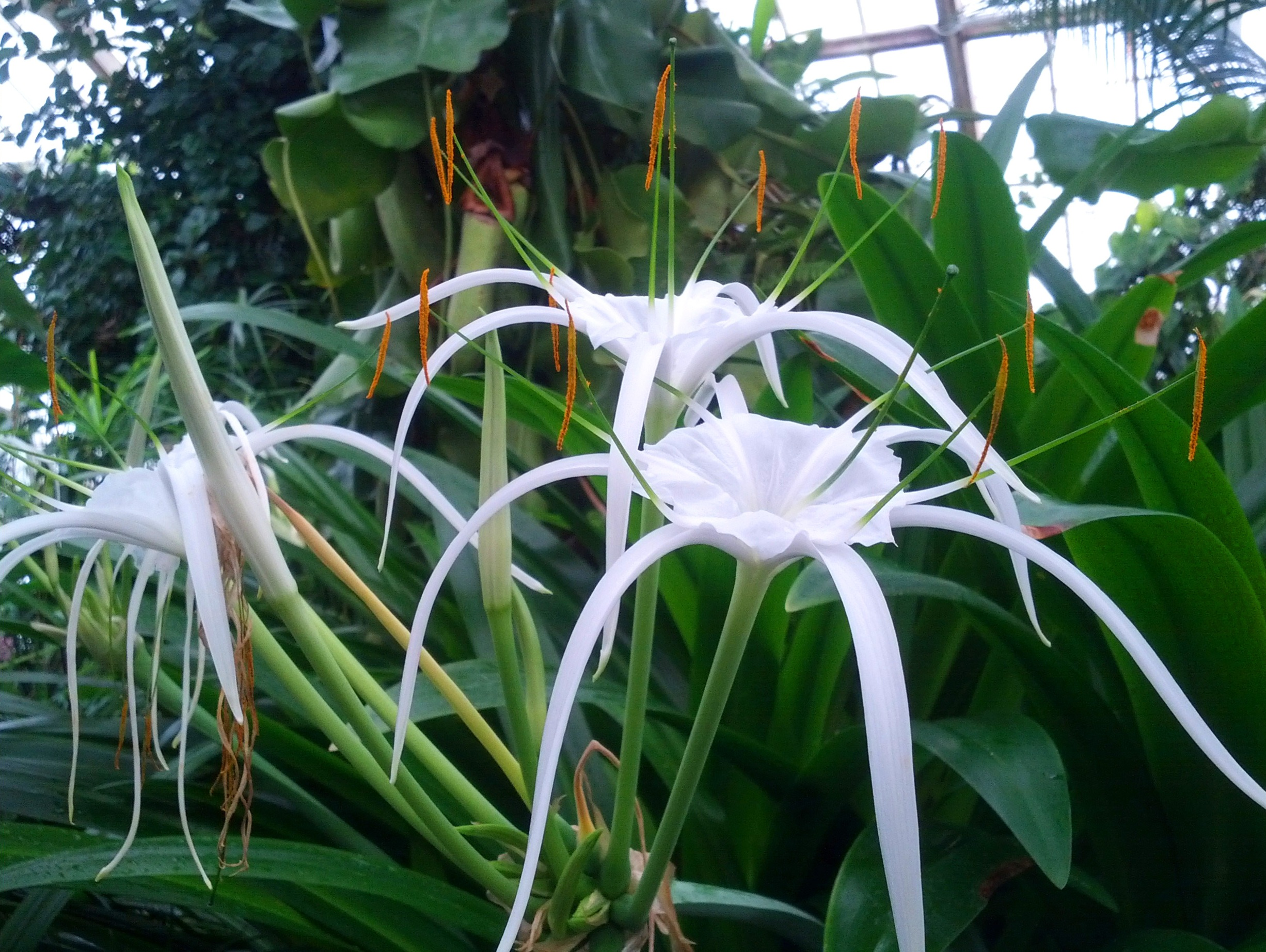
- Hymenocallis caribaea

Scientific classification
- Kingdom: Plantae
- Clade: Embryophytes
- Clade: Tracheophytes
- Clade: Spermatophytes
- Clade: Angiosperms
- Clade: Monocots
- Order: Asparagales
- Family: Amaryllidaceae
- Subfamily: Amaryllidoideae
- Tribe: Hymenocallideae (D.M.-D. & U.M.-D.) Meerow

Type genus
- Hymenocallis Salisb.

Genera
- See text

Synonyms
- Hymenocallidinae D. & U. M.-D.

= Hymenocallideae =

Tribe of flowering plants

Hymenocallideae is a tribe (in the family Amaryllidaceae, subfamily Amaryllidoideae), where it forms part of the Andean clade, one of two American clades. The tribe was originally recognised by both Meerow (1995) and the Muller-Doblies' (1996). Its phylogenetic position within the Amaryllidoideae was established by Meerow et al. in 2000, while in-depth infratribal relationships were established in 2002.

== Taxonomy ==
Müller-Doblies (1996) considered this assemblage as a subtribe, Hymenocallidinae, of tribe Eucharideae, prior to Meerow and Snijman (1998) separating them into their own tribes.

=== Phylogeny ===
The placement of Hymenocallideae within subfamily Amaryllidoideae is shown in the following cladogram, where this tribe is shown as a sister group to Clinantheae.

Cladogram: Tribes of subfamily Amaryllidoideae

- Subfamily Amaryllidoideae
  - Africa
    Tribe Amaryllideae
  - - - Africa
        Tribe Cyrtantheae
      - - Africa
          Tribe Haemantheae
        - Australasia
          Tribe Calostemmateae
    - - Eurasian clade
        - Asia
          Tribe Lycorideae
        - Mediterranean
          - Tribe Galantheae
          - - Tribe Pancratieae
            - Tribe Narcisseae
      - American clade
        - Hippeastroid clade
          - Tribe Griffineae
          - Tribe Hippeastreae
        - Andean clade
          - - Tribe Eustephieae
          - - Tribe Eucharideae/Stenomesseae
            - - - Tribe Clinantheae
                - Tribe Hymenocallideae

=== Subdivision ===
The tribe has three genera:

- Hymenocallis (Type genus)
- Ismene
- Leptochiton

== Bibliography ==
- Kubitzki, K., ed. (1998). Flowering Plants · Monocotyledons: Lilianae (except Orchidaceae). The families and genera of vascular plants. Vol. 3. Berlin: Springer-Verlag. ISBN 978-3-540-64060-8.
- Meerow, Alan. "Towards a phylogeny of the Amaryllidaceae". In Rudall et al. (1995), pp. 169–179.
- Meerow, A.W.; Snijman, D.A. "Amaryllidaceae". In Kubitzki (1998), pp. 83–110. doi:10.1007/978-3-662-03533-7_11 (excerpts)
- Meerow, A.W.; Fay, M.F.; Guy, C.L.; Li, Q.-B.; Zaman, F.Q.; Chase, M.W. (1999). "Systematics of Amaryllidaceae based on cladistic analysis of plastid rbcL and trnL-F sequence data". Am. J. Bot. 86 (9): 1325–1345. doi:10.2307/2656780. JSTOR 2656780. PMID 10487820.
- Meerow, A.W.; Guy, C.L.; Li, Q.-B.; Yang, S.-L. (2000). "Phylogeny of the American Amaryllidaceae Based on nrDNA ITS Sequences" (PDF). Systematic Botany. 25 (4): 708–726. doi:10.2307/2666729. JSTOR 2666729. S2CID 20392462. Archived from the original (PDF) on 23 September 2015.
- Meerow, Alan W.; Guy, Charles L.; Li, Qin-Bao; Clayton, Jason R. (2002). "Phylogeny of the Tribe Hymenocallideae (Amaryllidaceae) Based on Morphology and Molecular Characters". Annals of the Missouri Botanical Garden. 89 (3): 400–413. doi:10.2307/3298600. JSTOR 3298600.
- Meerow, Alan W.; Snijman, Deirdre A. (2006). "The never-ending story: multigene approaches to the phylogeny of Amaryllidaceae". Aliso. 22: 355–366. doi:10.5642/aliso.20062201.29.
- Müller-Doblies, U.; Müller-Doblies, D. (1996). "Tribes and subtribes and some species combinations in Amaryllidaceae J St Hil R Dahlgren & al. 1985". Feddes Repertorium. 107 (5–6): S.c.1–S.c.9.
- Rudall, P.J.; Cribb, P.J.; Cutler, D.F.; Humphries, C.J., eds. (1995). Monocotyledons: systematics and evolution (Proceedings of the International Symposium on Monocotyledons: Systematics and Evolution, Kew 1993). Kew: Royal Botanic Gardens. ISBN 978-0-947643-85-0.
- Stevens, P.F. (2001–2012), Angiosperm Phylogeny Website: Amaryllidoideae
- Vigneron, Pascal (2008). "Amaryllidaceae". Amaryllidaceae.org (in French). Archived from the original on 4 January 2015.
- "Amaryllidaceae: A taxonomic tool for the Amaryllidaceae of the world". eMonocot. Archived from the original on 2016-03-04.
