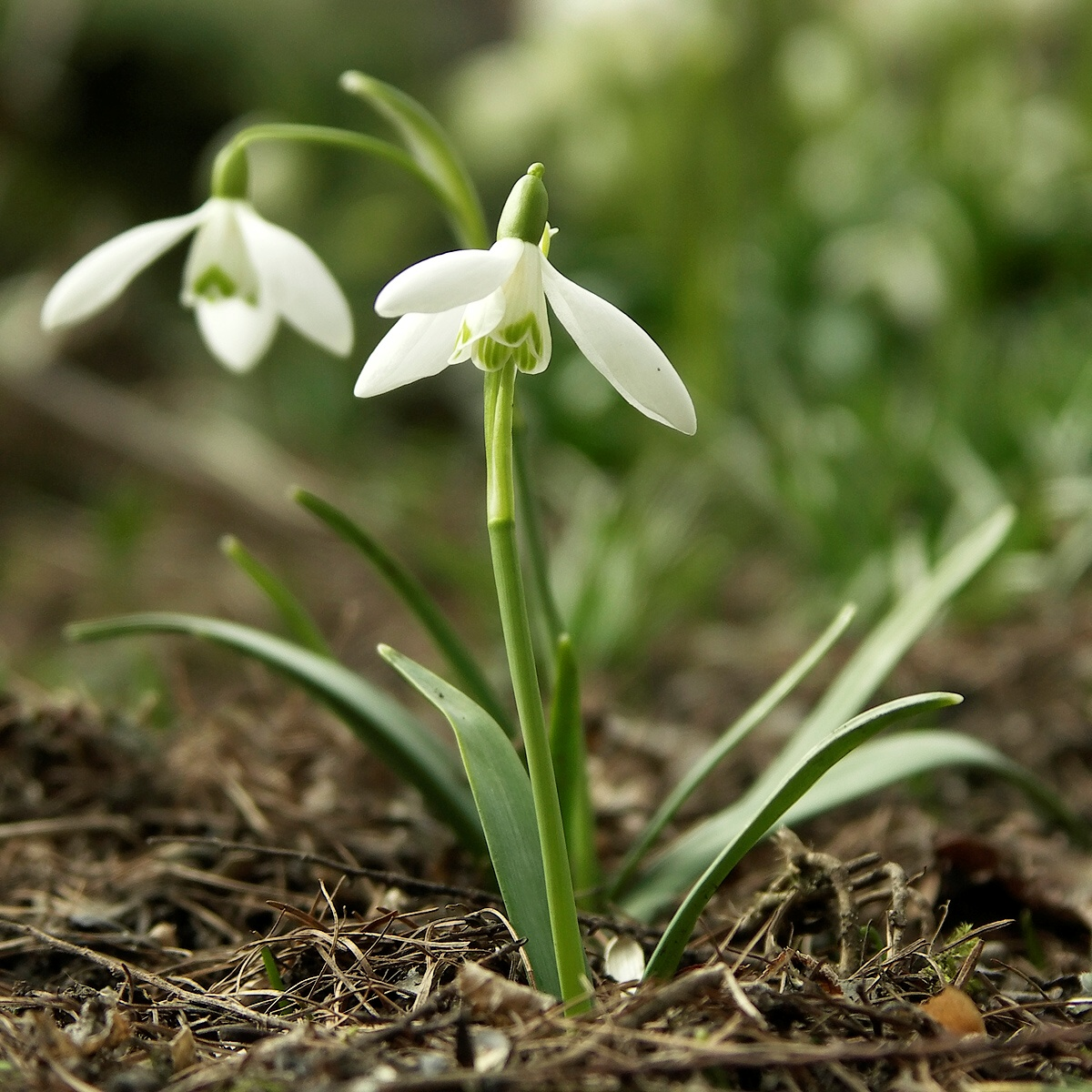
- Galanthus nivalis

Scientific classification
- Kingdom: Plantae
- Clade: Tracheophytes
- Clade: Angiosperms
- Clade: Monocots
- Order: Asparagales
- Family: Amaryllidaceae
- Subfamily: Amaryllidoideae
- Tribe: Galantheae; Parlatore

Type genus
- Galanthus L.

Genera
- Acis; Galanthus; Leucojum

Synonyms
- Galanthinae

= Galantheae =

Tribe of flowering plants

Galantheae is a tribe of European, West Asian and North African flowering plants belonging to the subfamily Amaryllidoideae of the Amaryllis family (Amaryllidaceae). As of 2017, it contains three genera, although more were included previously. The position of the ovary is inferior.

== Taxonomy ==
For a history of the circumscription of Galantheae, see Meerow et al. 2006. A narrower sense of the tribe is now favoured, with only three genera.

=== Phylogeny ===
The placement of Galantheae within subfamily Amaryllidoideae is shown in the following cladogram:

Cladogram: Tribes of subfamily Amaryllidoideae

- Subfamily Amaryllidoideae
  - Africa
    Tribe Amaryllideae
  - - - Africa
        Tribe Cyrtantheae
      - - Africa
          Tribe Haemantheae
        - Australasia
          Tribe Calostemmateae
    - - Eurasian clade
        - Asia
          Tribe Lycorideae
        - Mediterranean
          - Tribe Galantheae
          - - Tribe Pancratieae
            - Tribe Narcisseae
      - American clade
        - Hippeastroid clade
          - Tribe Griffineae
          - Tribe Hippeastreae
        - Andean clade
          - - Tribe Eustephieae
          - - Tribe Eucharideae/Stenomesseae
            - - - Tribe Clinantheae
                - Tribe Hymenocallideae

=== Subdivision ===
Included genera are:

- Acis Salisb.
- Galanthus L.
- Leucojum L.

Previously included were:

- Hannonia
- Lapiedra
- Vagaria

== Distribution and habitat ==
Galantheae represent one of the three European tribes of Amaryllidaceae (predominantly Mediterranean).

== Cultivation ==
Some species of Acis, Galanthus and Leucojum are common ornamental garden plants.

== Bibliography ==
- Larsen, Maja Mellergaard; Adsersen, Anne; Davis, Aaron P.; Lledó, M. Dolores; Jäger, Anna K.; Rønsted, Nina (October 2010). "Using a phylogenetic approach to selection of target plants in drug discovery of acetylcholinesterase inhibiting alkaloids in Amaryllidaceae tribe Galantheae". Biochemical Systematics and Ecology. 38 (5): 1026–1034. Bibcode:2010BioSE..38.1026L. doi:10.1016/j.bse.2010.10.005.
- Lledó, Ma D.; Davis, A. P.; Crespo, M. B.; Chase, M. W.; Fay, M. F. (14 June 2004). "Phylogenetic analysis of Leucojum and Galanthus (Amaryllidaceae) based on plastid matK and nuclear ribosomal spacer (ITS) DNA sequences and morphology". Plant Systematics and Evolution. 246 (3–4). Bibcode:2004PSyEv.246..223L. doi:10.1007/s00606-004-0152-0. S2CID 43826738.
- Meerow A. 1995. Towards a phylogeny of the Amaryllidaceae. In P. J. Rudall, P. J. Cribb, D. F. Cutler, and C. J. Humphries [eds.], Monocotyledons: systematics and evolution, 169-179. Royal Botanic Gardens, Kew.
- Meerow A. and D. A. Snijman. 1998 Amaryllidaceae. In K. Kubitzki [ed.], Families and genera of vascular plants, vol. 3, 83-110. Springer-Verlag, Berlin.
- Müller-Doblies, D., and U. Müller-Doblies. 1978. Studies on tribal systematics of Amaryllidaceae. 1 The systematic position of Lapiedra Lag.. Lagascalia 8: 13-23.
- Meerow, Alan W. Michael F. Fay, Charles L Guy, Qin-BaoLi, Faridah Q Zaman and Mark W. Chase. 1999 Systematics of Amaryllidaceae based on cladistic analysis of plastid sequence data. American Journal of Botany. 86: 1325.
- Meerow, AW; Francisco-Ortega, J; Schnell, RJ (2006). "Phylogenetic relationships and biogeography within the Eurasian clade of Amaryllidaceae based on plastid ndhF and nrDNA ITS sequences: lineage sorting in a reticulate area?". Systematic Botany. 31 (1): 42–60. doi:10.1600/036364406775971787. JSTOR 25064128. S2CID 85953035. Archived from the original on 2021-02-25. Full text
- Meerow, Alan W.; Snijman, Deirdre A. (2006). "The never-ending story: multigene approaches to the phylogeny of Amaryllidaceae". Aliso. 22: 355–366. doi:10.5642/aliso.20062201.29.
- Müller-Doblies, U.; Müller-Doblies, D. (1996). "Tribes and subtribes and some species combinations in Amaryllidaceae J St Hil R Dahlgren & al. 1985". Feddes Repertorium. 107 (5–6): S.c.1–S.c.9.
- Vigneron, Pascal. "Amaryllidaceae". Amaryllidaceae.org (in French). Archived from the original on 4 January 2015.
- Stevens, P.F. (2001–2012), Angiosperm Phylogeny Website: Amaryllidoideae
- "Amaryllidaceae: A taxonomic tool for the Amaryllidaceae of the world". eMonocot. Archived from the original on 2016-03-04.
