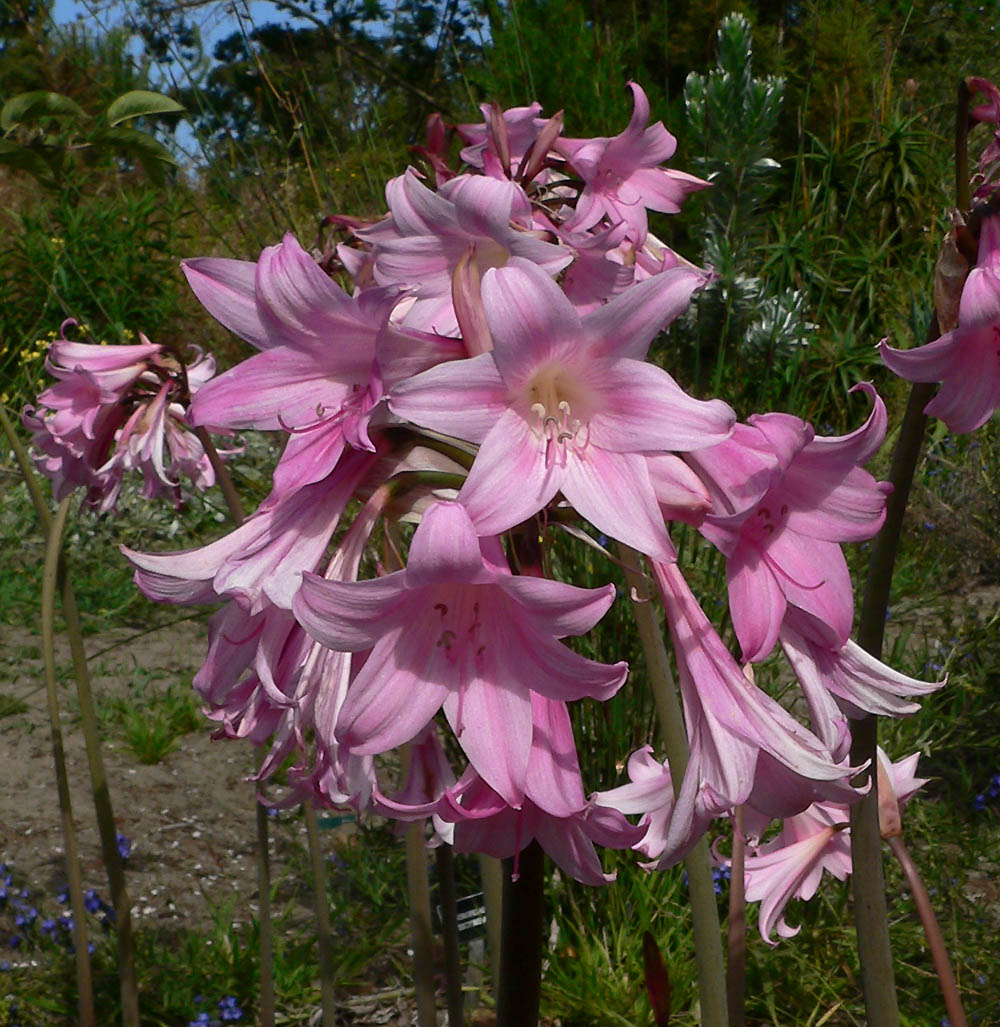
- Amaryllis belladonna

Scientific classification
- Kingdom: Plantae
- Clade: Tracheophytes
- Clade: Angiosperms
- Clade: Monocots
- Order: Asparagales
- Family: Amaryllidaceae
- Subfamily: Amaryllidoideae

Type genus
- Amaryllis L.

Tribes
- See text

Synonyms
- Amarylloideae Traub

= Amaryllidoideae =

Subfamily of flowering plants

Amaryllidoideae (Amaryllidaceae s.s., amaryllids) is a subfamily of monocot flowering plants in the family Amaryllidaceae, order Asparagales. The most recent APG classification, APG IV, takes a broad view of the Amaryllidaceae, which then has three subfamilies, one of which is Amaryllidoideae (the old family Amaryllidaceae), and the others are Allioideae (the old family Alliaceae) and Agapanthoideae (the old family Agapanthaceae). The subfamily consists of about seventy genera, with over eight hundred species, and a worldwide distribution.

== Description ==
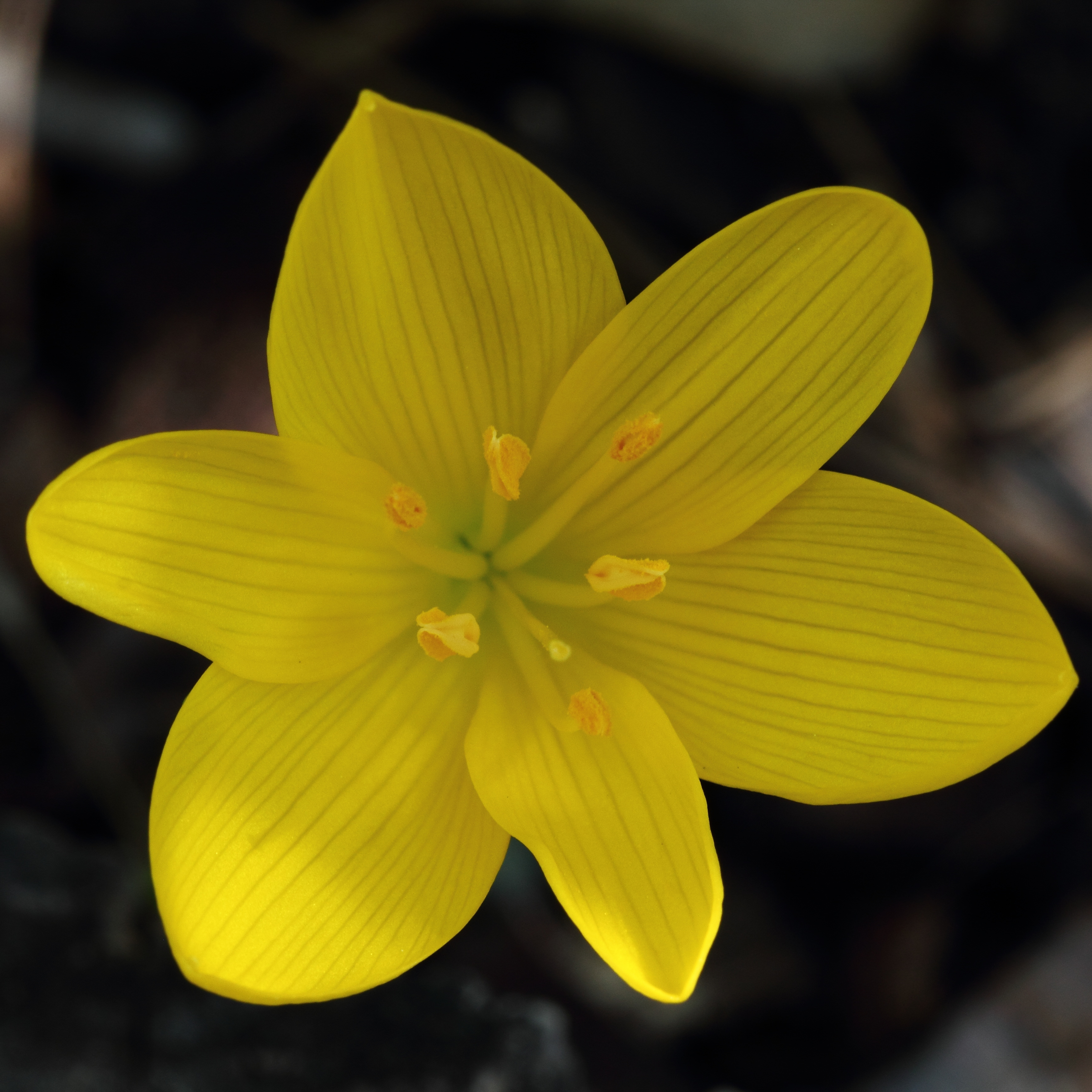
Organization of an Amaryllidoideae flower (Sternbergia lutea) with the six non-differentiated tepals and the six stamens

The Amaryllidoideae are herbaceous, perennial flowering plants, usually with bulbs (some are rhizomatous). Their fleshy leaves are arranged in two vertical columns, and their flowers are large. Most of them are bulbous geophytes and many have a long history of cultivation as ornamental plants. They are distinguished from the other two Amaryllidaceae subfamilies (Agapanthoideae and Allioideae) by their unique alkaloidal chemistry, inferior ovary, and hollow style.

== Taxonomy ==
=== History ===
==== Pre-Darwinian ====
The name Amaryllis had been applied to a number of plants over the course of history. When Linnaeus formerly described the type genus Amaryllis, from which the family derives its name, in his Species Plantarum in 1753, there were nine species with this name. He placed Amaryllis in a grouping he referred to as Hexandria monogynia (i.e. six stamens and one pistil) containing 51 genera in all in his sexual classification scheme.

These genera have been treated as either liliaceous or amaryllidaceaeous (see Taxonomy of Liliaceae) over time. In 1763 Michel Adanson placed them in 'Liliaceae' In 1789 Antoine Laurent de Jussieu placed Amaryllis and related genera within a division of Monocotyledons, using a modified form of Linnaeus' sexual classification but with the respective topography of stamens to carpels rather than just their numbers.

The family Amaryllidaceae was named in 1805, by Jean Henri Jaume Saint-Hilaire. In 1810 Brown proposed that a subgroup of Liliaceae be distinguished on the basis of the position of the ovaries (inferior) and be referred to as Amaryllideae and in 1813 de Candolle described Liliacées Juss. and Amaryllidées Brown as two quite separate families. Samuel Frederick Gray's A natural arrangement of British plants (1821). grouped together a number of families having in common six equal stamens, a single style and a perianth that was simple and petaloid, within which he separated families by the characteristics of their fruit and seed, such as Amaryllideae, Liliaceae, Asphodeleae and Asparageae.

John Lindley, in his An Introduction to the Natural System of Botany (1830) divided the "Monocotyledonous Plants" into two tribes. He then further divided the Petaloidea (petaloid monocots), into 32 orders, including the Amaryllideae. He defined the latter as "Hexapetaloideous bulbous hexandrous monocotyledons, with an inferior ovarium, a 6-parted perianthium with equitant sepals, and flat spongy seeds" and included Amaryllis, Phycella, Nerine, Vallota, and Calostemma.

By 1846 Lindley had greatly expanded and refined the treatment of the monocots. He placed the Liliaceae within the Liliales, but saw it as a paraphyletic ("catch-all") family, being all Liliales not included in the other orders, hoping that the future would reveal some characteristic that would group them better. This kept the Liliaceae. separate from the Amaryllidaceae, which was divided into four tribes (with 68 genera), yet both his Amaryllidaceae and Liliaceae contained many genera that would eventually segregate to each other's contemporary orders (Liliales and Asparagales respectively). The Liliaceae would be reduced to a small 'core' represented by the tribe Tulipeae, while large groups such as Scilleae and Asparagae would become part of Asparagales either as part of the Amaryllidaceae or as separate families. Of the four tribes of the Amaryllidaceae, the Amaryllideae and Narcisseae would remain as core amaryllids while the Agaveae would be part of Asparagaceae but the Alstroemeriae would become a family within the Liliales.

Since then seven of Linnaeus' genera have consistently been placed in a common taxonomic unit of amaryllids, based on the inferior position of the ovaries (whether this be as an order, suborder, family, subfamily, tribe or section). Thus much of what we now consider Amaryllidoideae remained in Liliaceae because the ovary was superior, till 1926 when John Hutchinson transferred them to Amaryllidaceae.

The number of known genera within these families continued to grow, and by the time of the Bentham and Hooker classification (1883) the Amaryllidaceae (Amaryllideae) were divided into four tribes, of which only one (Amarylleae) still represents the grouping now reflected in Amarylloideae.

In the post-Darwinian era the amaryllids were mainly treated as part of a very large family Liliaceae, although the early twentieth century saw increasing doubts about the inclusion of many of its components, particularly the alliaceous (i.e. Allioideae) elements. Hutchinson also suggested that the elements now included in Amaryllidoideae's parent family (Amaryllidaceae) could all be placed in one family, although only Cronquist placed all the elements into a very large Liliaceae.

=== Angiosperm Phylogeny Group ===
The introduction of molecular methods in the 1990s confirmed the affinity of three major taxa corresponding to Alliaceae, Agapanthaceae and Amaryllidaceae. In 2009 the Angiosperm Phylogeny Group (APG) decided to amalgamate the three families, which together form a monophyletic group, into a single family, at first called Alliaceae and then Amaryllidaceae. The three families then became reduced to subfamilies, so that the historical Amaryllidaceae became subfamily Amaryllidoideae. To distinguish this new broader family from the older narrower family it has become customary to refer to Amaryllidaceae sensu APG, or as used by APG, Amaryllidaceae s.l.. as opposed to Amaryllidaceae s.s..

The relationships between the subfamilies within the Amaryllidaceae and the place of Amaryllidoideae is shown in the Cladogram.

Cladogram: Amaryllidaceae
sensu s.l./APG

- Amaryllidaceae s.l.
  - - Subfamily Agapanthoideae
  - - Subfamily Allioideae
    - Subfamily Amaryllidoideae

=== Subdivision ===
Complete resolution of infrafamilial (suprageneric) relationships within subfamily Amaryllidoideae (Amaryllidaceae s.s.) has proven difficult. Early studies lacked sufficient resolution for further elucidation of this group. Historically a wide variety of infrafamilial classification systems have been proposed for the Amaryllidaceae s.s.. In the latter twentieth century there were at least six schemes, including Hutchinson (1926), Traub (1963), Dahlgren (1985), Müller-Doblies and Müller-Doblies (1996), Hickey and King (1997) and Meerow and Snijman (1998). Hutchinson was an early proponent of the larger Amaryllidaceae, transferring taxa from Liliaceae and had three tribes, Agapantheae, Allieae and Gilliesieae. Traub (who provides a brief history of the family) largely followed Hutchinson, but with four subfamilies (Allioideae, Hemerocalloideae, Ixiolirioideae and Amaryllidoideae), the Amaryllidoideae he then divided further into two "infrafamilies", Amarylloidinae and Pancratioidinae, an arrangement with 23 tribes in total. In Dahlgren's system, a "splitter" who favoured larger numbers of smaller families, he adopted a narrower circumscription than Traub, using only the latter's Amaryllidoideae which he treated as nine tribes. Müller-Doblies described ten tribes (and 19 subtribes). Hickey and King described ten tribes by which the family were divided, such as the Zephyrantheae. Meerow and Snijder considered thirteen tribes, one (Amaryllideae) with two subtribes (For a comparison of these schemes see Meerow et al. 1999, Table I).

Thus Traub's Amaryllidoideae, which most later authors treated as Amaryllidaceae s.s., became the basis for Amaryllidoideae sensu APGIII. Of the other three subfamilies in Traub's system, Allioideae represents Amaryllidaceae subfamily Allioideae sensu APGIII. Hemerocalloideae was a small subfamily with a single tribe, Hemerocalleae consisting of two genera, Hemerocallis and Leucocrinum. Subsequent research has shown these to be very different taxa, Hemerocallis being placed in the family Xanthorrhoeaceae, while Leucocrinum belongs in Asparagaceae, both part of Asparagales. Finally Ixiolirioideae was another very small subfamily, with two tribes, Gageeae and Ixiolirieae. Gageeae consisted of two genera, Gagea and Giraldiella, which was subsequently merged with Gagea (Liliaceae, Liliales), while Ixiolirieae similarly contained only Ixiolirion and Kolpakowskia (merged with Ixiolirion) belongs in Ixioliriaceae (Asparagales). so only two of his subfamilies now belong in Amaryllidaceae s.l..

Historical distribution of Amaryllidaceae (sensu stricto) tribes and subtribes
Traub 1963 Subfamily: Amarylloideae	Dahlgren 1985	Müller-Doblies 1996	Meerow 1998	Molecular phylogenetics
Infrafamily: Amarylloidinae; Traubieae	Hippeastreae	Hippeastreae; Traubiinae	Hippeastreae	Hippeastreae Traubiinae
Zephyrantheae	Hippeastreae	Hippeastreae; Zephyranthinae	Hippeastreae	Hippeastreae; Hippeastrinae
Amarylleae	Hippeastreae	Amaryllideae; Amaryllidinae; Hippeastreae; Hippeastrinae	Amaryllideae; Amaryllidinae	Amaryllideae; Amaryllidinae; Griffineae
Lycoreae	Lycorideae	Lycorideae	Lycorideae	Lycorideae
Narcisseae	Narcisseae	Narcisseae; Narcissinae	Narcisseae	Narcisseae
Galantheae	Galantheae	Narcisseae; Galanthinae; Lapiedrinae	Galantheae	Galantheae; Narcisseae
Crineae	Amaryllideae	Amaryllideae; Crininae; Boophoninae	Amaryllideae; Crininae	Amaryllideae; Crininae
Cyrtantheae	Haemantheae	Haemantheae; Cyrtanthinae	Cyrtantheae	Cyrtantheae
Clivieae	Haemantheae	Haemantheae; Cliviinae	Haemantheae	Haemantheae; Cliviinae
Haemantheae	Haemantheae	Haemantheae; Haemanthinae	Haemantheae	Hemantheae; Haemanthinae
Gethylleae	Haemantheae	Gethyllideae	Gethyllideae	Hemantheae; Gethyllidinae
Strumarieae	Amaryllideae	Amaryllideae; Strumariinae	Amaryllideae; Amaryllidinae	Amaryllideae; Strumariinae
Infrafamily: Pancratioidinae; Pancratieae	Pancratieae	Pancratieae; Pancratiinae	Pancratieae	Pancratieae
Stenomessae	Stenomesseae	Eustephieae; Stenomessinae; Eustephiinae	Stenomesseae	Stenomesseae/Eucharideae; Eustephieae; Clinantheae
Euchareae	Eucharideae	Eucharideae; Eucharidinae; Hymenocallidinae; Hippeastreae; Griffiniinae; Calostemmateae	Eucharideae; Hymenocallideae; Hippeastreae	Stenomesseae/Eucharideae; Griffineae; Hymenocallideae; Calostemmateae
Eustephieae	Stenomesseae	Eustephieae; Stenomessinae; Eustephiinae; Hippeastreae; Hippeastrinae	Stenomesseae; Eustephieae; Hippeastreae	Stenomesseae/Eucharideae; Hippeastreae; Hippeastrinae; Traubiinae; Clinantheae; Eustephieae

The further application of molecular phylogenetics produced a complex picture that only partially related to the tribal structure considered up to that date, which had been based on morphology alone. Rather Amaryllidaceae resolved along biogeographical lines. A predominantly South African clade identified as Amaryllideae was a sister group to the rest of the family. The two other African tribes were Haemantheae and Cyrtantheae, and an Australasian tribe Calostemmateae was also identified, but a large clade could only be described as Eurasian and American, each of which were monophyletic sister clades to each other. The Eurasian clade was poorly resolved with the exception of Lycorideae (Central and East Asian). The American clade was better resolved identifying both Hippeastreae as a tribe (and Zephyranthinae as a subtribe within it). The American clade also included an Andean clade

Further investigation of the American clade suggested the presence of two groups, the Andean clade and a further "Hippeastroid" clade, in which Griffineae was sister to the rest of the clade (Hippeastreae). Similarly within the Andean clade four subclades were identified, including Eustephieae which appeared as sister to the remaining clade, including Hymenocallideae. Of the remaining taxa, two subclades emerged that did not correspond to existing tribal structure, namely Eucharideae (3 genera) and Stenomesseae (6 genera). Rather the taxa segregated on a morphological criterion, namely leaf shape. Stenomesseae was recognised as polyphyletic with two distinct types based on leaf shape (lorate-leafed and petiolate-leafed), while Eucharideae was petiolate, together with three Stenomesseae genera and a number of species of the type genus Stenomesson. Furthermore, the type species of Stenomesson, Stenomesson flavum is petiolate. The consequent petiolate Eucharideae/Stenomesseae subclade could not be further resolved into distinct monophyletic tribes. Subsequent treatment has been variable. Meerow et al. state here that this subclade should be called Stenomesseae because the type species of Stenomesson was petiolate and thus transferred from the former Stenomesseae into the new petiolate clade. Subsequently, Meerow (2004) treated the Andean clade as having four tribes with Eucharis in Stenomesseae.

However, since then the term Eucharideae has been used instead. For example, in a paper presented at Monocot IV (2008), a cladogram published in 2013, and in 2014 only Eucharideae is mentioned while in 2015 Meerow described new species of Stenomesson and Eucharis as being in Eucharideae. The combined clade would include Stenomessaea as the reduced Stenomesson (sensu stricto), Rauhia, Phaedranassa, and Eucrosia, together with Eucharideae as Eucharis, Caliphruria, and Urceolina.

Based on the oldest published name for the remaining lorate Stenomesson species, which is Clinanthus, the lorate subclade was designated tribe Clinantheae, and the remaining species transferred. In this redescription, Clinanthus luteus becomes the type species for tribe Clinantheae which includes Pamianthe, Paramongaia and Pucara. Although subsequent analysis resulted in submerging Pucara into Stenomesson (and hence Stenomesseae), rather than treating it as a separate genus.

The Eurasian clade was also further resolved (for historical treatment, see Table I Meerow et al. 2006) into four tribes, Pancratieae, Narcisseae, Galantheae and Lycorideae. This positioned Lycorideae as sister to the remaining Mediterranean tribes.

These relationships are summarised in the following cladogram:

Cladogram: Tribes of subfamily Amaryllidoideae

- Subfamily Amaryllidoideae
  - Africa
    Tribe Amaryllideae
  - - - Africa
        Tribe Cyrtantheae
      - - Africa
          Tribe Haemantheae
        - Australasia
          Tribe Calostemmateae
    - - Eurasian clade
        - Asia
          Tribe Lycorideae
        - Mediterranean
          - Tribe Galantheae
          - - Tribe Pancratieae
            - Tribe Narcisseae
      - American clade
        - Hippeastroid clade
          - Tribe Griffineae
          - Tribe Hippeastreae
        - Andean clade
          - - Tribe Eustephieae
          - - Petiolate
              Eucharideae/Stenomesseae
            - - - Tribe Clinantheae
                - Tribe Hymenocallideae

Publication of the third version of the APG classification and acceptance of Amaryllidaceae s.l. was accompanied by a listing of accepted subfamily and tribal names, since the change in rank from family to subfamily necessitated a revision of other lower ranks, as follows:

Family: Amaryllidaceae J.St.-Hil., Expos. Fam. Nat. 1: 134. Feb–Apr 1805, nom. cons.

- Subfamily: Amaryllidoideae Burnett, Outl. Bot.: 446. Feb 1835 (15 tribes)
  - Tribe Amaryllideae Dumort., Anal. Fam. Pl.: 58. 1829.
  - Tribe Calostemmateae D.Müll.-Doblies & U.Müll.Doblies, Feddes Repert. 107 (Short commun.): 7 December 1996.
  - Tribe Cyrtantheae Traub, Herbertia 5: 111. Nov 1938.
  - Tribe Eucharideae Hutch., Fam.Fl.Pl.2:130.20 Jul 1934.
  - Tribe Eustephieae Hutch., Fam.Fl.Pl.2:130.20 Jul 1934.
  - Tribe Galantheae Parl., Fl. Ital. 3: 75. 1858.
  - Tribe Gethyllideae Dumort., Anal. Fam. Pl.: 58. 1829.
  - Tribe Haemantheae Hutch., Fam. Fl. Pl. 2: 130. 20 July 1934.
  - Tribe Hippeastreae Herb. ex Sweet, Brit. Fl. Gard., ser. 2, 1: ad t. 14. 1 September 1829.
  - Tribe Hymenocallideae Small, Man. S.E. Fl.: 315. 30 November 1933.
  - Tribe Lycorideae Traub ex D.Müll.-Doblies & U.Müll.Doblies, Feddes Repert. 107 (Short commun.): 6. Dec. 1996.
  - Tribe Narcisseae Lam. & DC., Syn. Pl. Fl. Gall.: 165. 30 June 1806.
  - Tribe Pancratieae Dumort., Anal. Fam. Pl.: 58. 1829.
  - Tribe Stenomesseae Traub, Pl. Life 19: 60. Jan 1963.

This circumscription differs from the phylogenetic descriptions of Meerow and colleagues in several respects, as described above. Griffineae is recognised as a distinct tribe within the Hippeastroid clade, and Stenomesseae is recognised as polyphyletic with two distinct types based on leaf shape and subsequent creation of Clinanthieae as a separate grouping (see Cladogram), the remainder being submerged into Eucharideae.

Additional tribes:

  - Tribe Griffineae Ravenna, Pl. Life (Stanford) 30: 65 (1974).
  - Tribe Clinantheae Meerow

==== Genera ====
The subfamily includes about 70 genera arranged in tribes and subtribes.

== Bibliography ==
=== Books ===
- Engler, Adolf; Prantl, Karl, eds. (1888). Die Natürlichen Pflanzenfamilien nebst ihren Gattungen und wichtigeren Arten, insbesondere den Nutzpflanzen, unter Mitwirkung zahlreicher hervorragender Fachgelehrten 1887–1915 II(5) (in German). Leipzig: W. Engelmann.
- Byng, James W. (2014). The Flowering Plants Handbook: A Practical Guide to Families and Genera of the World. Plant Gateway Ltd. ISBN 978-0-9929993-0-8.
- Dahlgren, R.M.; Clifford, H.T.; Yeo, P.F. (1985). The families of the monocotyledons. Berlin: Springer-Verlag. ISBN 978-3-642-64903-5.
- Hickey, Michael; King, Clive (1997). Common families of flowering plants. Cambridge: Cambridge University Press. ISBN 978-0-521-57609-3. [http://www.cambridge.org/ca/academic/subjects/life-sciences/botanical-reference/common-families-flowering-plants?format=PB At C.U.P.
- Hutchinson, John (1934). The families of flowering plants, arranged according to a new system based on their probable phylogeny. 2 vols (1 ed.). Macmillan. Volume 1: Monocotyledonae 1926, Volume 2:Dicotyledonae 1934.
- Kubitzki, K., ed. (1998). The families and genera of vascular plants. Vol.3. Berlin, Germany: Springer-Verlag. ISBN 978-3-540-64060-8.
- Traub, H.P. (1963). Genera of the Amaryllidaceae. Genera of organisms. La Jolla, California: American Plant Life Society.
- Kamenetsky, Rina; Okubo, Hiroshi, eds. (2013). Ornamental Geophytes: From Basic Science to Sustainable Production. CRC Press. ISBN 978-1-4398-4924-8.

=== Symposia ===
- Rudall, P.J.; Cribb, P.J.; Cutler, D.F.; Humphries, C.J., eds. (1995). Monocotyledons: systematics and evolution (Proceedings of the International Symposium on Monocotyledons: Systematics and Evolution, Kew 1993). Kew: Royal Botanic Gardens. ISBN 978-0-947643-85-0.
- Wilson, K. L.; Morrison, D. A., eds. (19 May 2000). Monocots: Systematics and evolution (Proceedings of the Second International Conference on the Comparative Biology of the Monocotyledons, Sydney, Australia 1998). Collingwood, Australia: CSIRO. ISBN 978-0-643-06437-9. Excerpts
- Seberg, Ole; Petersen, Gitte; Barfod, Anders; Davis, Jerrold I., eds. (2010). Diversity, phylogeny, and evolution in the Monocotyledons: proceedings of the Fourth International Conference on the Comparative Biology of the Monocotyledons and the Fifth International Symposium on Grass Systematics and Evolution. Århus: Aarhus University Press. ISBN 978-87-7934-398-6.

=== Chapters ===
- Meerow, AW; Snijman, DA (1998). "Amaryllidaceae". Flowering Plants · Monocotyledons. pp. 83–110. doi:10.1007/978-3-662-03533-7_11. ISBN 978-3-642-08377-8. S2CID 240114483., in Kubitzki (1998). (additional excerpts)
- Meerow, Alan W.; Fay, Michael F.; Chase, Mark W.; Guy, Charles L.; Li, Qin-Bao; Snijman, Deirdre; Yang, Si-Lin (2000). Phylogeny of Amaryllidaceae: Molecules and morphology. Csiro. pp. 372–386. ISBN 978-0-643-09929-6., in Wilson & Morrison (2000)
- Meerow, Alan. Towards a phylogeny of the Amaryllidaceae. pp. 169–179., in Rudall et al. (1995)
- Meerow, Alan. Taxonomy and Phylogeny. pp. 17–55., in Kamenetsky (2013)
- Meerow, Alan. Convergence or Reticulation? Mosaic Evolution in the Canalized American Amaryllidaceae. pp. 145–168., in Seberg et al (2010)
- Pax, Ferdinand (17 October 1887). Amaryllidaceae. Vol. Teil 2, Abt. 1–6. W. Engelmann. pp. 97–124., in Engler & Prantl (1888)

=== Articles and theses ===
- Angiosperm Phylogeny Group (2009). "An update of the Angiosperm Phylogeny Group classification for the orders and families of flowering plants: APG III". Botanical Journal of the Linnean Society. 161 (2): 105–121. doi:10.1111/j.1095-8339.2009.00996.x. hdl:10654/18083.
- APG IV (2016). "An update of the Angiosperm Phylogeny Group classification for the orders and families of flowering plants: APG IV". Botanical Journal of the Linnean Society. 181 (1): 1–20. doi:10.1111/boj.12385.
- Chase, M.W.; Reveal, J.L.; Fay, M.F. (2009). "A subfamilial classification for the expanded asparagalean families Amaryllidaceae, Asparagaceae and Xanthorrhoeaceae". Botanical Journal of the Linnean Society. 161 (2): 132–136. doi:10.1111/j.1095-8339.2009.00999.x.
- Fay, Michael F.; Chase, Mark W. (August 1996). "Resurrection of Themidaceae for the Brodiaea alliance, and Recircumscription of Alliaceae, Amaryllidaceae and Agapanthoideae". Taxon. 45 (3): 441–451. Bibcode:1996Taxon..45..441F. doi:10.2307/1224136. JSTOR 1224136.
- García, Nicolás; Meerow, Alan W.; Soltis, Douglas E.; Soltis, Pamela S. (1 March 2014). "Testing Deep Reticulate Evolution in Amaryllidaceae Tribe Hippeastreae (Asparagales) with ITS and Chloroplast Sequence Data". Systematic Botany. 39 (1): 75–89. Bibcode:2014SysBo..39...75G. doi:10.1600/036364414X678099. S2CID 86117335.
- Meerow, A.W.; Fay, M.F.; Guy, C.L.; Li, Q.-B.; Zaman, F.Q.; Chase, M.W. (1999). "Systematics of Amaryllidaceae based on cladistic analysis of plastid rbcL and trnL-F sequence data". Am. J. Bot. 86 (9): 1325–1345. doi:10.2307/2656780. JSTOR 2656780. PMID 10487820.
- Meerow, A.W.; Guy, C.L.; Li, Q.-B.; Yang, S.-L. (2000). "Phylogeny of the American Amaryllidaceae Based on nrDNA ITS Sequences". Systematic Botany. 25 (4): 708–726. Bibcode:2000SysBo..25..708M. doi:10.2307/2666729. JSTOR 2666729. S2CID 20392462. Archived from the original on 2013-04-08.
- Meerow, Alan W.; Snijman, Deirdre A. (December 2001). "Phylogeny of Amaryllidaceae Tribe Amaryllideae Based on nrDNA ITS Sequences and Morphology". American Journal of Botany. 88 (12): 2321–2330. Bibcode:2001AmJB...88.2321M. doi:10.2307/3558392. JSTOR 3558392. PMID 21669663. (subscription required)
- Meerow, Alan W.; Clayton, Jason R. (1 February 2004). "Generic relationships among the baccate-fruited Amaryllidaceae (tribe Haemantheae) inferred from plastid and nuclear non-coding DNA sequences". Plant Systematics and Evolution. 244 (3–4): 141–155. Bibcode:2004PSyEv.244..141M. doi:10.1007/s00606-003-0085-z. S2CID 10245220.
- Meerow, Alan W.; Guy, Charles L.; Li, Qin-Bao; Clayton, Jason R. (2002). "Phylogeny of the Tribe Hymenocallideae (Amaryllidaceae) Based on Morphology and Molecular Characters". Annals of the Missouri Botanical Garden. 89 (3): 400–413. Bibcode:2002AnMBG..89..400M. doi:10.2307/3298600. JSTOR 3298600.
- Meerow, Alan W.; van der Werff, Henk (1 July 2004). "Pucara (Amaryllidaceae) Reduced to Synonymy with Stenomesson on the Basis of Nuclear and Plastid DNA Spacer Sequences, and a New Related Species of Stenomesson". Systematic Botany. 29 (3): 511–517. Bibcode:2004SysBo..29..511M. doi:10.1600/0363644041744400. S2CID 85742067.
- Meerow, AW; Francisco-Ortega, J; Schnell, RJ (2006). "Phylogenetic relationships and biogeography within the Eurasian clade of Amaryllidaceae based on plastid ndhF and nrDNA ITS sequences: lineage sorting in a reticulate area?". Systematic Botany. 31 (1): 42–60. Bibcode:2006SysBo..31...42M. doi:10.1600/036364406775971787. JSTOR 25064128. S2CID 85953035. Full text
- Meerow, Alan W.; Snijman, Deirdre A. (2006). "The never-ending story: multigene approaches to the phylogeny of Amaryllidaceae". Aliso. 22: 355–366. doi:10.5642/aliso.20062201.29.
- Meerow, Alan; Jost, Lou; Oleas, Nora (2 April 2015). "Two new species of endemic Ecuadorean Amaryllidaceae (Asparagales, Amaryllidaceae, Amarylloideae, Eucharideae)". PhytoKeys (48): 1–9. Bibcode:2015PhytK..48....1M. doi:10.3897/phytokeys.48.4399. PMC 4408727. PMID 25931969.
- —; Gardner, Elliot M.; Nakamura, Kyoko (5 November 2020). "Phylogenomics of the Andean Tetraploid Clade of the American Amaryllidaceae (Subfamily Amaryllidoideae): Unlocking a Polyploid Generic Radiation Abetted by Continental Geodynamics". Frontiers in Plant Science. 11 582422. Bibcode:2020FrPS...1182422M. doi:10.3389/fpls.2020.582422. PMC 7674842. PMID 33250911.
- Müller-Doblies, U.; Müller-Doblies, D. (1996). "Tribes and subtribes and some species combinations in Amaryllidaceae J St Hil R Dahlgren & al. 1985". Feddes Repertorium. 107 (5–6): S.c.1–S.c.9.
- Singh, V. (July 1972). "Floral morphology of the Amaryllidaceae. I. Subfamily Amaryllidioideae". Canadian Journal of Botany. 50 (7): 1555–1565. Bibcode:1972CaJB...50.1555S. doi:10.1139/b72-192.
- Weber, Odile; Wilkin, Paul (May 2007). "588. Stenomesson pearcei". Curtis's Botanical Magazine. 24 (2): 114–120. doi:10.1111/j.1467-8748.2007.00572.x.
- Strydom, Aéle (2005). Phylogenetic relationships in the family Amaryllidaceae (PDF). Department of Plant Sciences, University of the Free State. Archived from the original (PhD thesis) on 2011-04-30.
- Traub, Hamilton P. (November 1952). "Biosystematic Experiments Involving Zephyranthes, Habranthus and Amaryllis". Taxon. 1 (8): 121–123. Bibcode:1952Taxon...1..121T. doi:10.2307/1216549. JSTOR 1216549.

=== History ===
- Linnaeus, C. (1753). Species Plantarum: exhibentes plantas rite cognitas, ad genera relatas, cum differentiis specificis, nominibus trivialibus, synonymis selectis, locis natalibus, secundum systema sexuale digestas. Stockholm: Impensis Laurentii Salvii. see also Species Plantarum
- Adanson, Michel (1763). Familles des plantes. Paris: Vincent.
- "Linnaeus Sexual System". CronkLab. Biodiversity Research Centre, University of British Columbia.
- Jussieu, Antoine Laurent de (1789). Genera Plantarum, secundum ordines naturales disposita juxta methodum in Horto Regio Parisiensi exaratam. Paris: apud viduam Herissant et Theophilum Barrois.
- Jaume Saint-Hilaire, Jean Henri (1805). Exposition de familles naturales. Paris: Treutel et Würtz.
- Brown, Robert (1810). Prodromus florae Novae Hollandiae et Insulae Van-Diemen, exhibens characteres plantarum. London: Taylor.
- Candolle, A. P. de (1813). Théorie élémentaire de la botanique, ou exposition des principes de la classification naturelle et de l'art de décrire et d'etudier les végétaux (in French).
- Gray, Samuel Frederick (1821). A natural arrangement of British plants: according to their relations to each other as pointed out by Jussieu, De Candolle, Brown, &c. including those cultivated for use; with an introduction to botany, in which the terms newly introduced are explained. London: Baldwin.
- Lindley, John (1830). An introduction to the natural system of botany : or, A systematic view of the organisation, natural affinities, and geographical distribution, of the whole vegetable kingdom: together with the uses of the most important species in medicine, the arts, and rural or domestic economy. London: Longman.
- Lindley, John (1846). The Vegetable Kingdom: or, The structure, classification, and uses of plants, illustrated upon the natural system. London: Bradbury.
- Bentham, G.; Hooker, J.D. (1883). Genera plantarum ad exemplaria imprimis in herbariis kewensibus servata definita (3 vols. 1865–1883) (in Latin). London: L Reeve & Co.

=== Websites ===
- Stevens, P.F. (2016) [2001]. Angiosperm Phylogeny Website. Missouri Botanical Gardens.
- Vigneron, Pascal (2008). "Amaryllidaceae". Amaryllidaceae.org (in French). Archived from the original on 2015-01-04.
- "Pacific Bulb Society". Pacific Bulb Society. 2012.
- "Amaryllidaceae: A taxonomic tool for the Amaryllidaceae of the world". eMonocot. Archived from the original on 2016-03-04.
