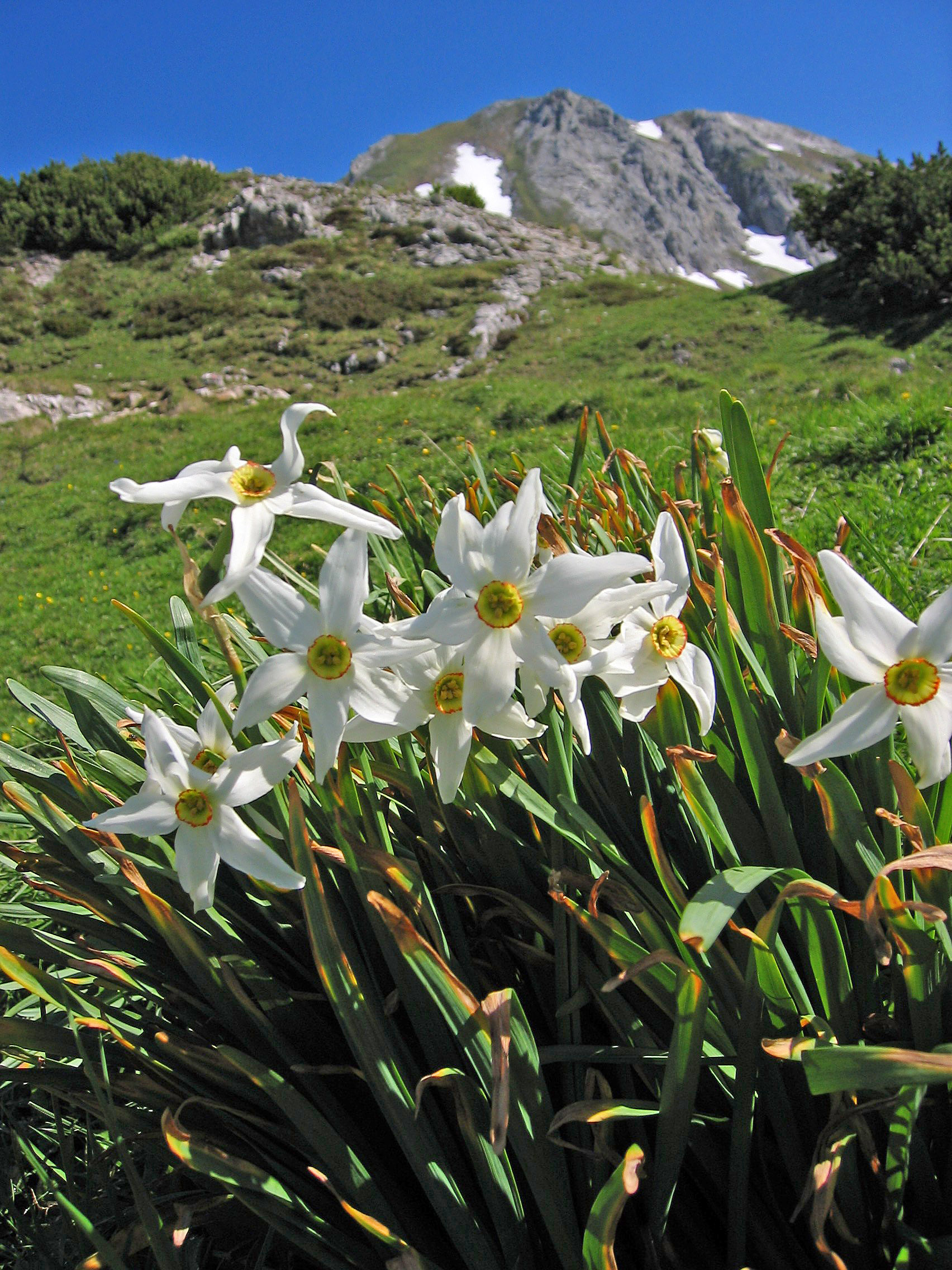
- Narcissus poeticus

Scientific classification
- Kingdom: Plantae
- Clade: Tracheophytes
- Clade: Angiosperms
- Clade: Monocots
- Order: Asparagales
- Family: Amaryllidaceae
- Subfamily: Amaryllidoideae
- Tribe: Narcisseae; Lamarck & de Candolle

Type genus
- Narcissus L.

Genera
- Narcissus; Sternbergia

Synonyms
- Narcissinae

= Narcisseae =

Tribe of flowering plants

Narcisseae is a small tribe of plants belonging to the subfamily Amaryllidoideae of the Amaryllis family (Amaryllidaceae), where it forms part of the Eurasian clade, and is one of three tribes in the European (Mediterranean) clade. It contains two genera (Narcissus and Sternbergia) and approximately 58 species, but probably also Lapiedra. The two genera are distinguished from each other by the presence of a paraperigonium in the former.

== Description ==
Characterised by a solid scape and spathaceous bracts fused into a floral tube (basally connate).

== Taxonomy ==
=== Phylogeny ===
The placement of Narcisseae within subfamily Amaryllidoideae is shown in the following cladogram, which demonstrates a sister group relationship with Pancratieae:

Cladogram: Tribes of subfamily Amaryllidoideae

- Subfamily Amaryllidoideae
  - Africa
    Tribe Amaryllideae
  - - - Africa
        Tribe Cyrtantheae
      - - Africa
          Tribe Haemantheae
        - Australasia
          Tribe Calostemmateae
    - - Eurasian clade
        - Asia
          Tribe Lycorideae
        - Mediterranean
          - Tribe Galantheae
          - - Tribe Pancratieae
            - Tribe Narcisseae
      - American clade
        - Hippeastroid clade
          - Tribe Griffineae
          - Tribe Hippeastreae
        - Andean clade
          - - Tribe Eustephieae
          - - Tribe Eucharideae/Stenomesseae
            - - - Tribe Clinantheae
                - Tribe Hymenocallideae

=== Subdivision ===
Genera:

- Narcissus L.
- Sternbergia Waldst. & Kitaibel
- (Lapiedra Lag.)

== Distribution ==
Western Mediterranean, extending east along the Silk Road to Asia Minor, Kashmir, China and Japan.

== Bibliography ==
- Stevens, P.F. (2016) [2001], Angiosperm Phylogeny Website, Missouri Botanical Gardens
- Gage, Ewan; Wilkin, Paul; Chase, Mark W.; Hawkins, Julie (June 2011). "Phylogenetic systematics of Sternbergia (Amaryllidaceae) based on plastid and ITS sequence data". Botanical Journal of the Linnean Society. 166 (2): 149–162. doi:10.1111/j.1095-8339.2011.01138.x. S2CID 84007862.
- Kubitzki, K., ed. (1998). The families and genera of vascular plants. Vol.3. Berlin, Germany: Springer-Verlag. ISBN 978-3-540-64060-8.
- Meerow, AW; Snijman, DA (1998). "Amaryllidaceae". Flowering Plants · Monocotyledons. pp. 83–110. doi:10.1007/978-3-662-03533-7_11. ISBN 978-3-642-08377-8. S2CID 240114483., in Kubitzki (1998). (additional excerpts)
- Meerow, A.W.; Fay, M.F.; Guy, C.L.; Li, Q.-B.; Zaman, F.Q.; Chase, M.W. (1999). "Systematics of Amaryllidaceae based on cladistic analysis of plastid rbcL and trnL-F sequence data". Am. J. Bot. 86 (9): 1325–1345. doi:10.2307/2656780. JSTOR 2656780. PMID 10487820.
- Meerow, AW; Francisco-Ortega, J; Schnell, RJ (2006). "Phylogenetic relationships and biogeography within the Eurasian clade of Amaryllidaceae based on plastid ndhF and nrDNA ITS sequences: lineage sorting in a reticulate area?". Systematic Botany. 31 (1): 42–60. doi:10.1600/036364406775971787. JSTOR 25064128. S2CID 85953035. Archived from the original on December 29, 2018. Full text
- Meerow, Alan W.; Snijman, Deirdre A. (2006). "The never-ending story: multigene approaches to the phylogeny of Amaryllidaceae". Aliso. 22: 355–366. doi:10.5642/aliso.20062201.29.
- "Amaryllidaceae: A taxonomic tool for the Amaryllidaceae of the world". eMonocot. Archived from the original on 2016-03-04.
