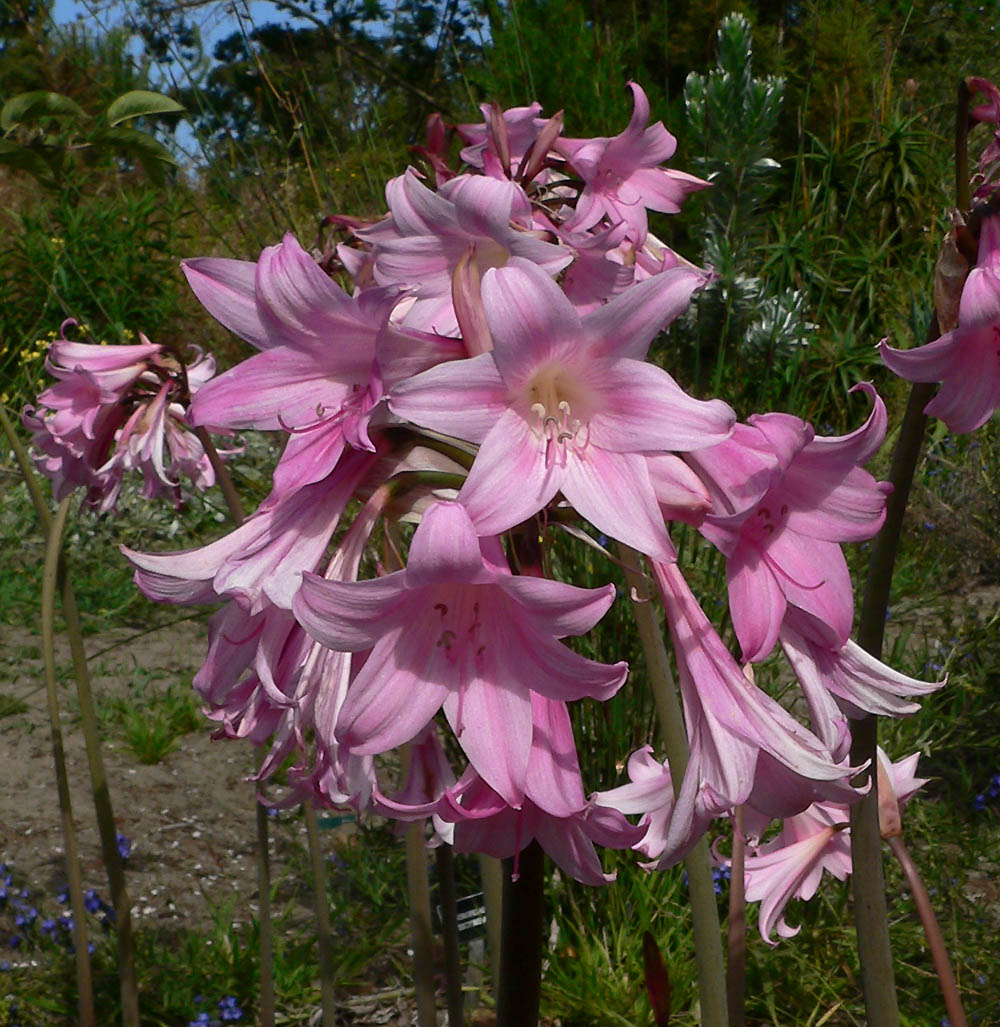
- Amaryllis belladonna

Scientific classification
- Kingdom: Plantae
- Clade: Tracheophytes
- Clade: Angiosperms
- Clade: Monocots
- Order: Asparagales
- Family: Amaryllidaceae
- Subfamily: Amaryllidoideae
- Tribe: Amaryllideae; Dumort.

Type genus
- Amaryllis L.

Subtribes
- Amaryllidinae; Boophoninae; Strumariinae; Crininae

Synonyms
- Amarylleae

= Amaryllideae =

Tribe of flowering plants

Amaryllideae are a tribe of subfamily Amaryllidoideae (family Amaryllidaceae). They are herbaceous monocot perennial flowering plants with a predominantly Southern African distribution, with the exception of the pantropical genus Crinum. They are generally treated as consisting of four subtribes. In addition to Crinum, other genera include Amaryllis, Boophone and Strumaria.

== Taxonomy ==
=== Phylogeny ===
The placement of Amaryllideae within subfamily Amaryllidoideae is shown in the following cladogram:

Cladogram: Tribes of subfamily Amaryllidoideae

- Subfamily Amaryllidoideae
  - Africa
    Tribe Amaryllideae
  - - - Africa
        Tribe Cyrtantheae
      - - Africa
          Tribe Haemantheae
        - Australasia
          Tribe Calostemmateae
    - - Eurasian clade
        - Asia
          Tribe Lycorideae
        - Mediterranean
          - Tribe Galantheae
          - - Tribe Pancratieae
            - Tribe Narcisseae
      - American clade
        - Hippeastroid clade
          - Tribe Griffineae
          - Tribe Hippeastreae
        - Andean clade
          - - Tribe Eustephieae
          - - Tribe Eucharideae/Stenomesseae
            - - - Tribe Clinantheae
                - Tribe Hymenocallideae

=== Subdivision ===
There are four subtribes:

- Amaryllidinae Pax
- Boophoninae D.Müll.-Doblies & U.Müll.-Doblies
- Crininae Baker
- Strumariinae Traub ex D.Müll.-Doblies & U.Müll.-Doblies

These are phylogenetically related as follows:

- Tribe Amaryllideae
  - Subtribe Amaryllidinae
  - - Subtribe Boophoninae
    - - Subtribe Strumariinae
      - Subtribe Crininae

Amaryllidinae: Type. Monogeneric subtribe for genus Amaryllis.

Boophoninae: Monogeneric subtribe for genus Boophone.

Crininae: Three genera including Crinum.

Strumariinae: Six genera including Strumaria and Nerine.

== Bibliography ==
- Du Mortier, Barthélemy-Charles (1829). Analyse des familles des plantes :avec l'indication des principaux genres qui s'y rattachent (in French). Tournay: Casterman.
- Meerow, Alan W.; Snijman, Deirdre A. (December 2001). "Phylogeny of Amaryllidaceae Tribe Amaryllideae Based on nrDNA ITS Sequences and Morphology". American Journal of Botany. 88 (12): 2321–2330. doi:10.2307/3558392. JSTOR 3558392. PMID 21669663. Archived from the original on 2019-02-26.
- Snijman, D. A.; Linder, H. P. (1996). "Phylogenetic Relationships, Seed Characters, and Dispersal System Evolution in Amaryllideae (Amaryllidaceae)". Annals of the Missouri Botanical Garden. 83 (3): 362–386. doi:10.2307/2399866. JSTOR 2399866.
- Vigneron, Pascal. "Amaryllidaceae". Amaryllidaceae.org (in French). Archived from the original on 4 January 2015.
- "Amaryllidaceae: A taxonomic tool for the Amaryllidaceae of the world". eMonocot. Archived from the original on 2016-03-04.
