= Hannonia =

Scientific classification
- Kingdom: Plantae
- Clade: Tracheophytes
- Clade: Angiosperms
- Clade: Monocots
- Order: Asparagales
- Family: Amaryllidaceae
- Subfamily: Amaryllidoideae
- Genus: Hannonia; Braun-Blanq. & Maire
- Species: H. hesperidum

Binomial name
- Hannonia hesperidum Braun-Blanq. & Maire

Genus of flowering plants

Hannonia is a genus of plants in the Amaryllis family. It contains only one known species, Hannonia hesperidum, endemic to Morocco and confined to Western Morocco, Promontory of Hercules. The specific epithet comes from Greek έσπερος, of evening, as the flowers open in the late afternoon.

== Description ==
The bulbs are 20-25x20 mm., with brown papery tunics; they have a long neck about 4 cm long. The species is hysteranthous. Scape about 10 cm high, 2-edged, a little twisted, hollow (according to; solid according to), terete; umbel two-flowered. Outermost leaf reduced to a scarious sheath with a very short blade, inner leaves 2 or 3, linear, fleshy, glaucous, flat, just 2 mm wide and 20 cm long. Spathe bracts two, free, but appressed to the scape below their middle. The pedicel is 1 cm, green; the perianth has a short green tube, 5 mm, much shorter than the tepal segments, spreading in six white tepals, 15 mm long and 2.5 mm wide, linear-lanceolate, a bit broadened below the apex, gradually attenuate (narrowing) towards the base, subequal (nearly equal), keeled green on the abaxial surface, keel formed by 3 closely spaced veins. The stamens are biseriate, free, inserted at the throat, 3 equaling the tepals, 3 shorter; filaments filiform; anthers dorsifixed (attached to the filaments at their middle), oblong, versatile, yellow; style white, filiform, and terete. Stigma captitate, obscurely 3-lobed. Ovary with 3 locules; ovules 5-6 per locule.

Flowering period: late summer. Each flower lasts just one day. No scent. Grows in rock-fissures, a very sandy-gritty soil is needed in cultivation. No water in summer and very little in winter. In areas which experience frost a frost-free bulb frame or a greenhouse have to be used. Full sun.

== Taxonomy ==
This genus was placed in tribe Galantheae by Traub on the basis of morphology only; molecular investigations are inconclusive.

The name Hannonia hesperidum var. legionariorum was coined in 1935 for a Moroccan plant initially thought to be a variety of Hannonia hesperidum. The name is, however, now considered a synonym of Vagaria ollivieri in the genus Vagaria.

== Bibliography ==
- Jimenez, H.J.; da Silva, A.D.F.; Martins, L.S.S.; de Carvalho, R.; de Moraes Filho, R. M. (2020). "Comparative genomics plastomes of the Amaryllidaceae family species". Scientia Plena. 16 (6): 1–10. doi:10.14808/sci.plena.2020.060202. Full text
- Meerow, Alan W.; Snijman, Deirdre A. (1998), "Amaryllidaceae", in Kubitzki, Klaus (ed.), The Families and Genera of Vascular Plants, vol. III, Springer-Verlag Berlin Heidelberg GmbH, pp. 83–110, doi:10.1007/978-3-662-03533-7, ISBN 978-3-642-08377-8, S2CID 30159571
- Meerow, A.W.; Fay, M.F.; Chase, M.F.; Guy, C.L.; Li, Q.-B.; Snijman, Deirdre; Yang, Si-Lin (2000). "Phylogeny of Amaryllidaceae: Molecules and morphology". In Wilson, K. L.; Morrison, D. A. (eds.). Monocots : Systematics and evolution (Proceedings of the Second International Conference on the Comparative Biology of the Monocotyledons, Sydney, Australia 1998). Collingwood, VIC, Australia: CSIRO. pp. 372–386. ISBN 978-0-643-06437-9. OCLC 52840686.Excerpts
- Traub, H.P. (1963). Genera of the Amaryllidaceae. Genera of organisms. La Jolla, California: American Plant Life Society.
