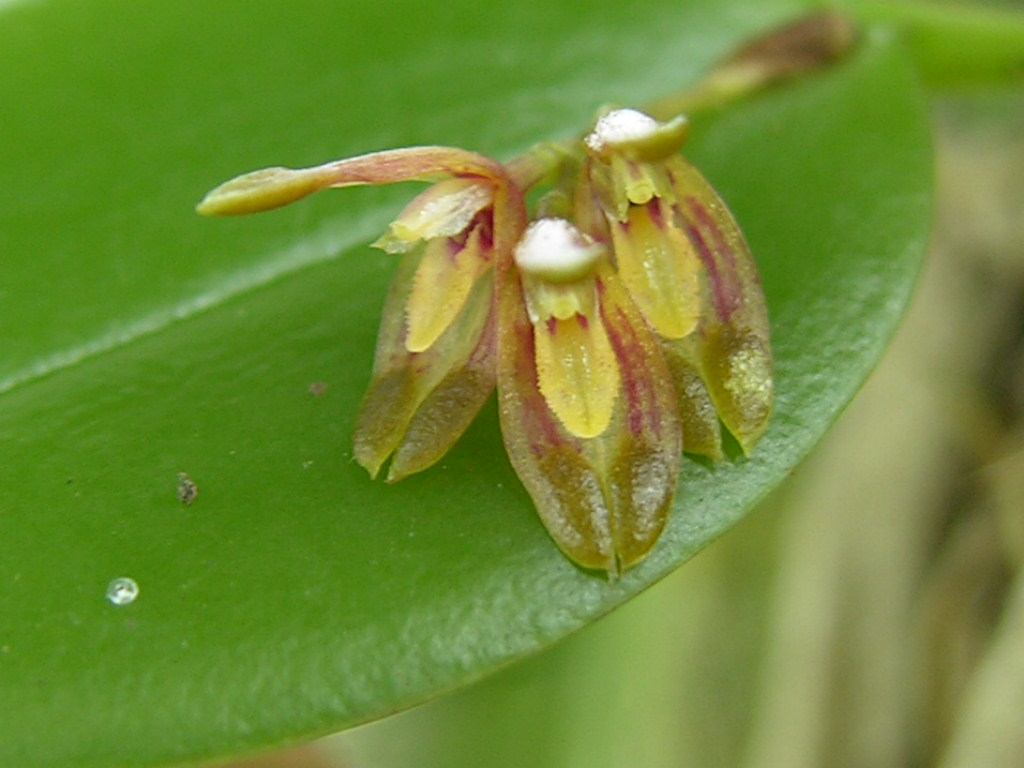

Scientific classification
- Kingdom: Plantae
- Clade: Embryophytes
- Clade: Tracheophytes
- Clade: Spermatophytes
- Clade: Angiosperms
- Clade: Monocots
- Order: Asparagales
- Family: Orchidaceae
- Subfamily: Epidendroideae
- Genus: Acianthera
- Species: A. agathophylla

Binomial name
- Acianthera agathophylla (Rchb.f.) Pridgeon & M.W.Chase

Synonyms
- Pleurothallis agathophylla Rchb.f.

= Acianthera agathophylla =

Species of plant

Acianthera agathophylla is a species of orchid plant native to Bolivia, Brazil, Ecuador, and Peru.
