= Acianthera antennata =

Scientific classification
- Kingdom: Plantae
- Clade: Tracheophytes
- Clade: Angiosperms
- Clade: Monocots
- Order: Asparagales
- Family: Orchidaceae
- Subfamily: Epidendroideae
- Genus: Acianthera
- Species: A. antennata

Binomial name
- Acianthera antennata (Garay) Pridgeon & M.W.Chase

Species of plant

Acianthera antennata is a species of orchid native to Brazil.

== Distribution ==
Its range is Southern Brazil. It is an epiphyte that grows in warm to cool habitats .

== Taxonomy ==
It was named by Alec Melton Pridgeon and Mark Wayne Chase, in 2001.
