= Amarylloidinae =

Amarylloidinae is a now obsolete informal name for an "infrafamily" within the Amaryllidaceae (Amaryllis) family, erected by Hamilton Traub. This grouping was designed to fill a perceived gap between the formal rank of subfamily and tribes. In his treatment of this family, he divided it first into four subfamilies. Within subfamily Amarylloideae he then divided his sixteen tribes into two infrafamilies, Amarylloidinae (12 tribes) and Pancratioidinae (4 tribes), both of which were subsequently demonstrated to be polyphyletic, and hence were abandoned by Dahlgren, who used no rank between family and tribe. On the other hand, he also used a much more restricted Amaryllidaceae corresponding to Traub's subfamily Amarylloideae. Thus Traub's Amarylloideae most closely resembles subfamily Amaryllidoideae sensu APGIII.

Of these infrafamilies, the smaller Pancratioidinae represents the Andean clade of Amaryllidoideae sensu APGIII, together with the Pancratieae from the Eurasian clade, hence the paraphyly. For a table of Traub's infrafamilies and tribes, and their subsequent disposition, see Subdivision of Amaryllidoideae.

== Bibliography ==
- Dahlgren, R.M.; Clifford, H.T.; Yeo, P.F. (1985). The families of the monocotyledons. Berlin: Springer-Verlag. ISBN 978-3-642-64903-5.
- Meerow, AW; Snijman, DA (1998). Flowering Plants · Monocotyledons. pp. 83–110. doi:10.1007/978-3-662-03533-7_11. ISBN 978-3-642-08377-8. S2CID 240114483., in Kubitzki (1998). (additional excerpts)
- Kubitzki, K., ed. (1998). The families and genera of vascular plants. Vol.3. Berlin, Germany: Springer-Verlag. ISBN 978-3-540-64060-8.
- Traub, H.P. (1963). Genera of the Amaryllidaceae. Genera of organisms. La Jolla, California: American Plant Life Society.
