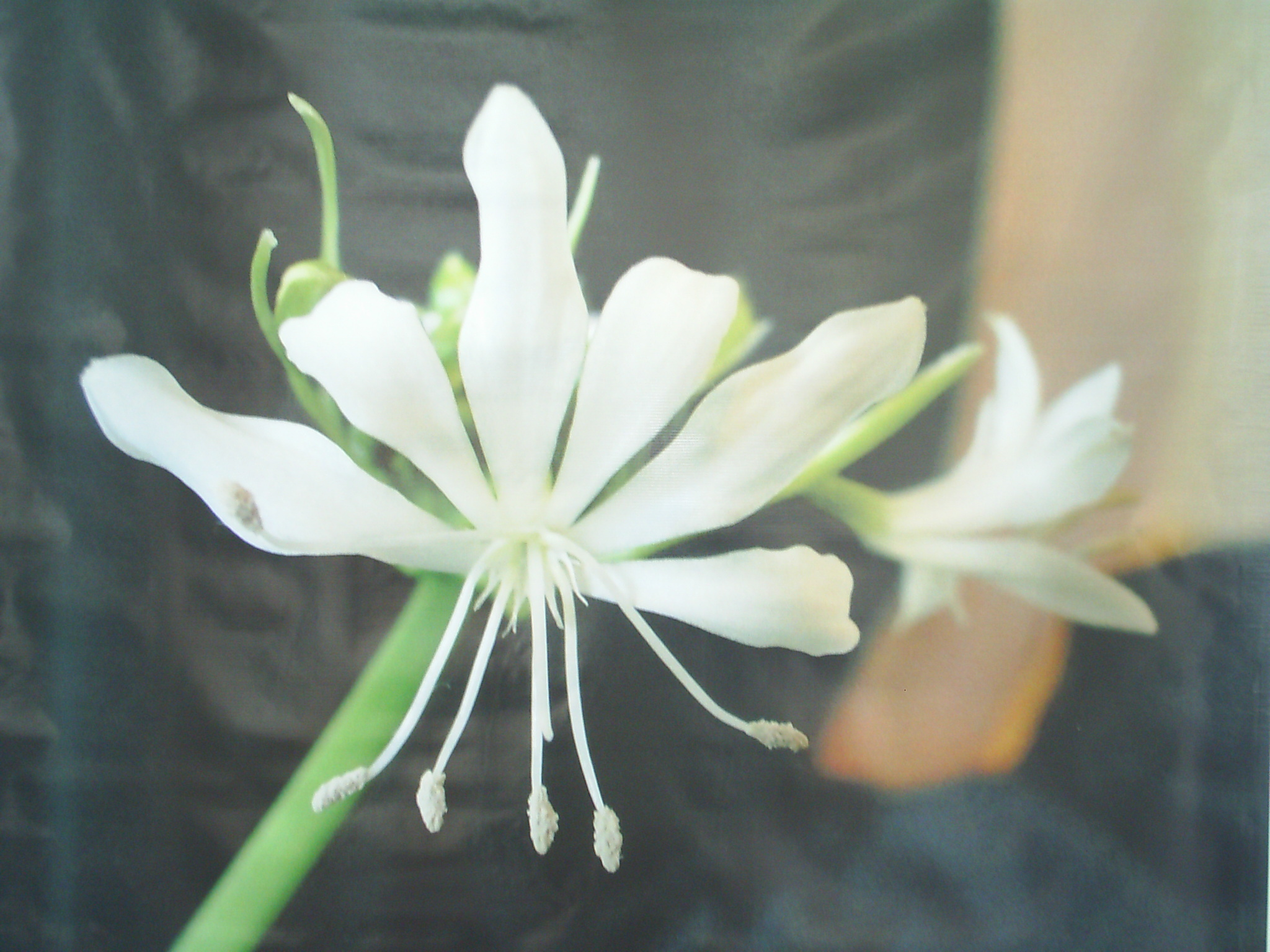

Scientific classification
- Kingdom: Plantae
- Clade: Tracheophytes
- Clade: Angiosperms
- Clade: Monocots
- Order: Asparagales
- Family: Amaryllidaceae
- Subfamily: Amaryllidoideae
- Tribe: Eucharideae
- Genus: Plagiolirion; Baker
- Species: P. horsmannii

Binomial name
- Plagiolirion horsmannii Baker
- Plagiolirion is endemic to Colombia

Synonyms
- Eucharis horsmannii (Baker) Traub; Urceolina horsmannii (Baker) Traub

= Plagiolirion =

Genus of plants

Plagiolirion is a monotypic genus in the family Amaryllidaceae endemic to Colombia. It has only one known species, Plagiolirion horsmannii, which is rare in the wild and was thought to be extinct until it was rediscovered in the Río Cauca Valley in 1989.

== Description ==
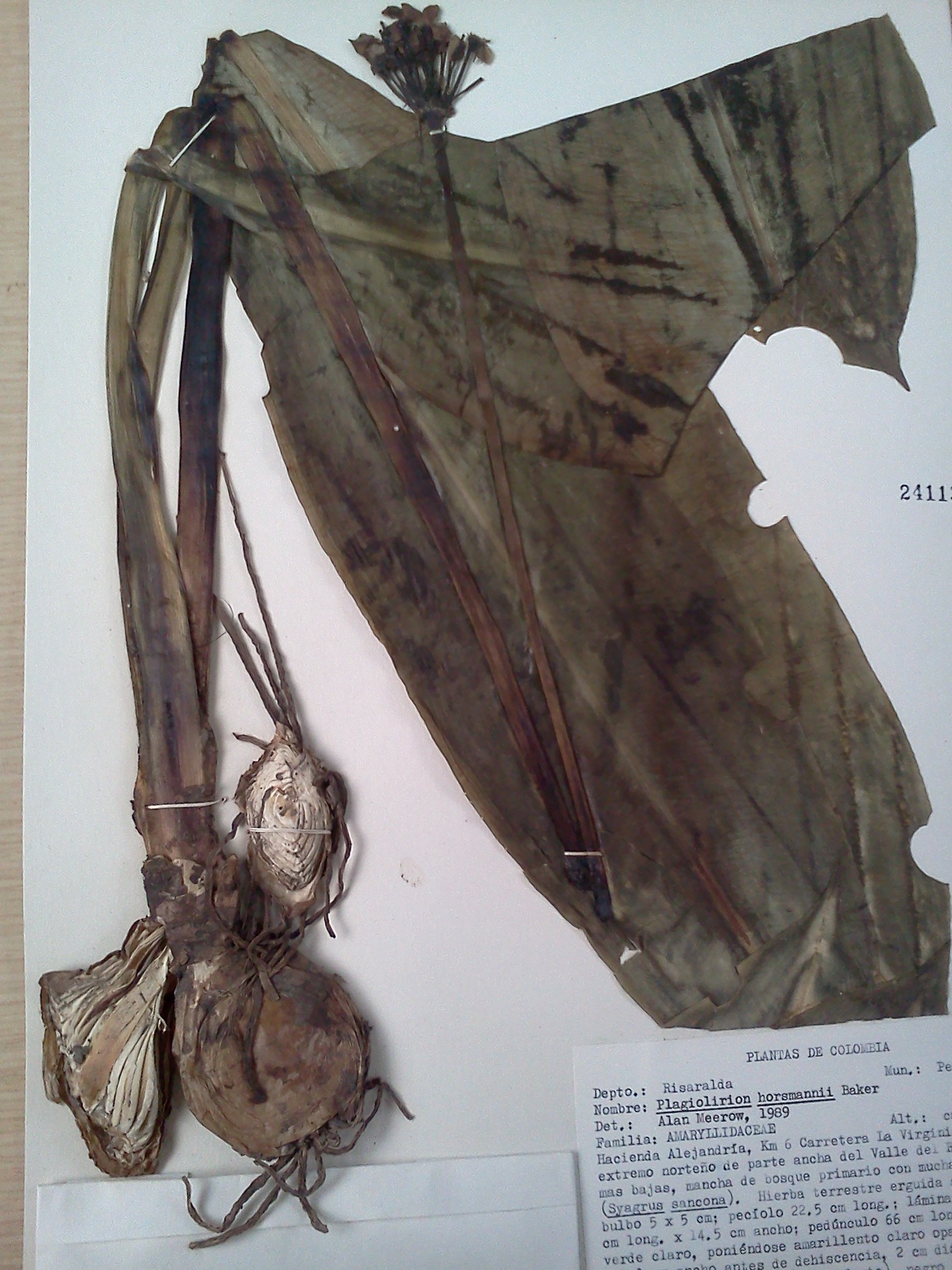
Herbarium specimen of Plagiolirion horsmanii

=== Vegetative characteristics ===
Plagiolirion horsmannii is a bulbous, perennial herb with subglobose or ovoid, tunicate, 5–6 cm long, and 5–5.5 cm wide bulbs with fleshy roots. The bulbs have offsets at the base.

=== Generative characteristics ===
The scapose, umbellate inflorescences with a terete, solid, erect, glaucous green, 49–66 cm long, and 0.5 cm wide scape, bears 10–41 white, zygomorphic, inodorous, protrandrous, pedicellate, 2.5–3 cm long, and 3–4 cm wide flowers. The thin pedicels are 1.5–2 cm long.

=== Cytology ===
The diploid chromosome number of Plagiolirion horsmannii is 2n = 46.

== Taxonomy ==
The genus and species were first described by John Gilbert Baker in 1883. The genus is placed in the tribe Eucharideae.

=== Etymology ===
The generic name Plagiolirion, from plagios meaning 'oblique' and leirion meaning 'lily', is derived from the floral morphology. The specific epithet horsmannii honours Fred Horsman, who imported the species to Colchester, United Kingdom.

== Ecology ==
=== Habitat ===
It occurs in the Colombian Andes.
