= Frederick Charles Newcombe =

American botanist (1858–1927)

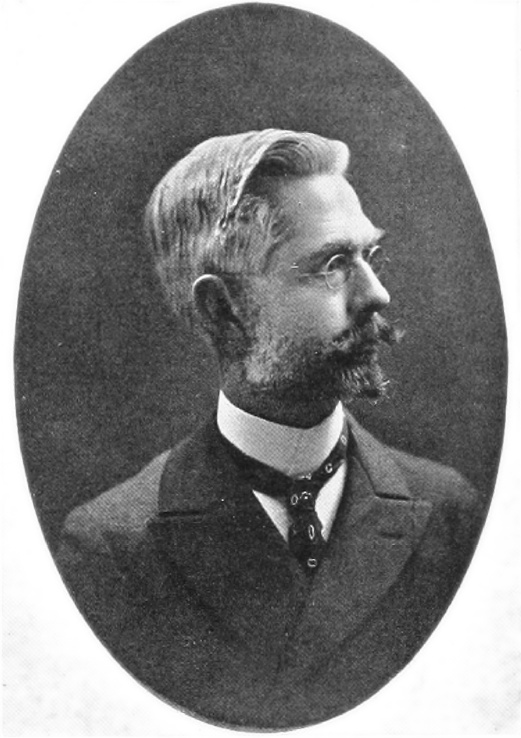

Frederick Charles Newcombe (1858–1927) was an American botanist, and the first editor-in-chief of the American Journal of Botany.

Newcombe was born in Flint, Michigan, May 11, 1858, to parents Thomas and Eliza (Gayton) Newcombe, who had emigrated from England in 1848. His early education was obtained in the public schools of Flint. From 1880 to 1887 he taught in the Michigan School for the Deaf at Flint. In 1887 he entered the University of Michigan, and was graduated Bachelor of Science in 1890. He was immediately appointed Instructor in Botany at the university. The year 1892-1893 was spent at the University of Leipzig, where he received the degree of Doctor of Philosophy at the end of the year. He returned to Ann Arbor to become Acting Assistant Professor of Botany in the university. Two years later he became assistant professor of botany, and in 1897 Junior Professor. In 1905 he was made Professor of Botany.

Newcombe was a fellow of the American Association for the Advancement of Science, of which he was one of the secretaries in 1899; a member of the Botanical Society of America and its 7th president; of the Society for Plant Morphology and Physiology, and its first vice-president in 1901; and of the Michigan Academy of Science. Of the last-named he was secretary in 1894, vice-president from 1894 to 1896, and president in 1903.
