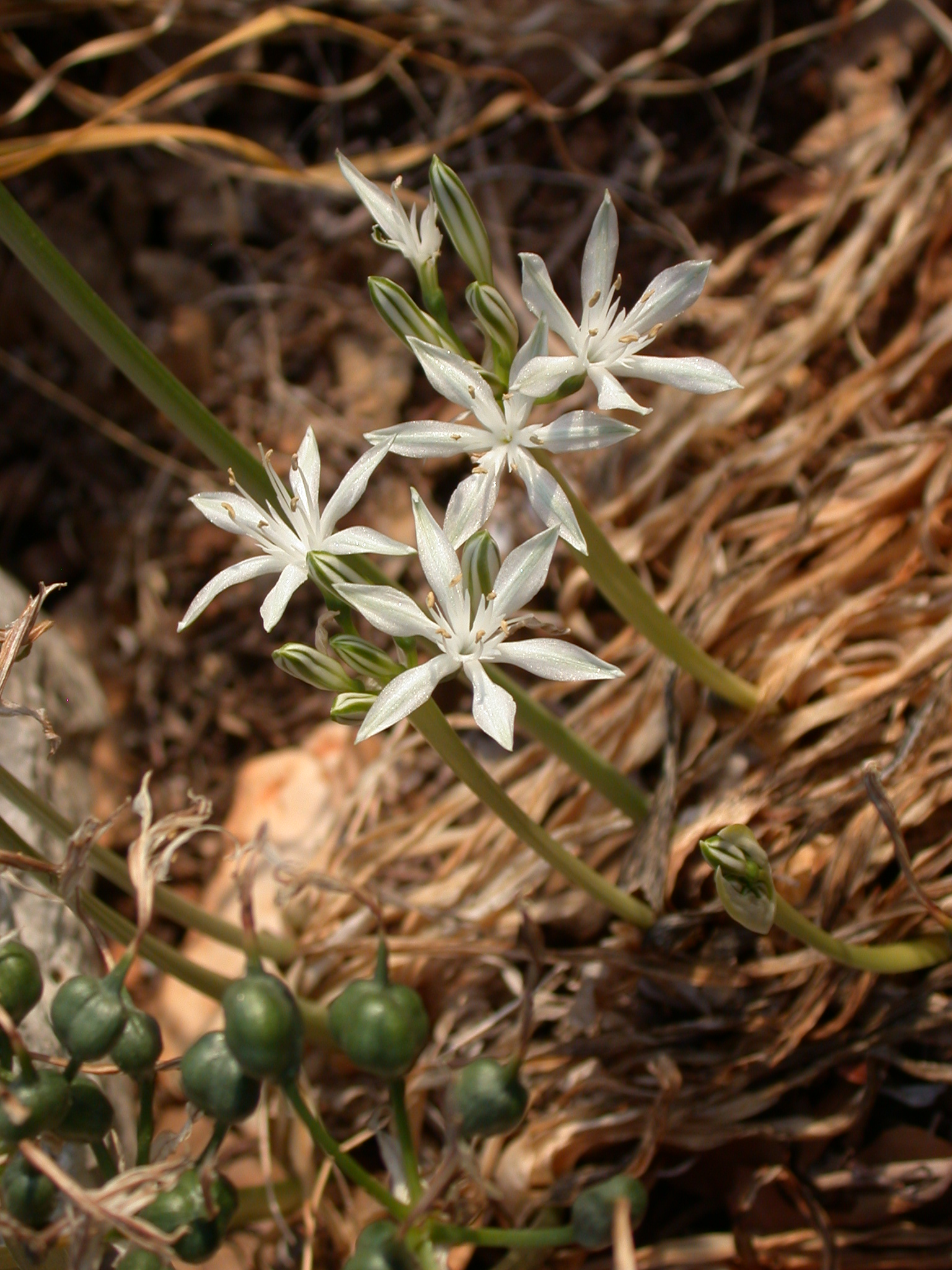
- Vagaria parviflora

Scientific classification
- Kingdom: Plantae
- Clade: Tracheophytes
- Clade: Angiosperms
- Clade: Monocots
- Order: Asparagales
- Family: Amaryllidaceae
- Subfamily: Amaryllidoideae
- Tribe: Pancratieae
- Genus: Vagaria; Herb.

Type species
- Vagaria parviflora (Desf. ex Delile) Herb.

= Vagaria =

Genus of flowering plants

Vagaria is a genus of Mediterranean plants in the Amaryllis family, widely cultivated as an ornamental because of its attractive white flowers.

Species

- Vagaria ollivieri Maire - Morocco
- Vagaria parviflora (Desf. ex Delile) Herb. - Turkey, Syria, Lebanon, Israel, Palestine
