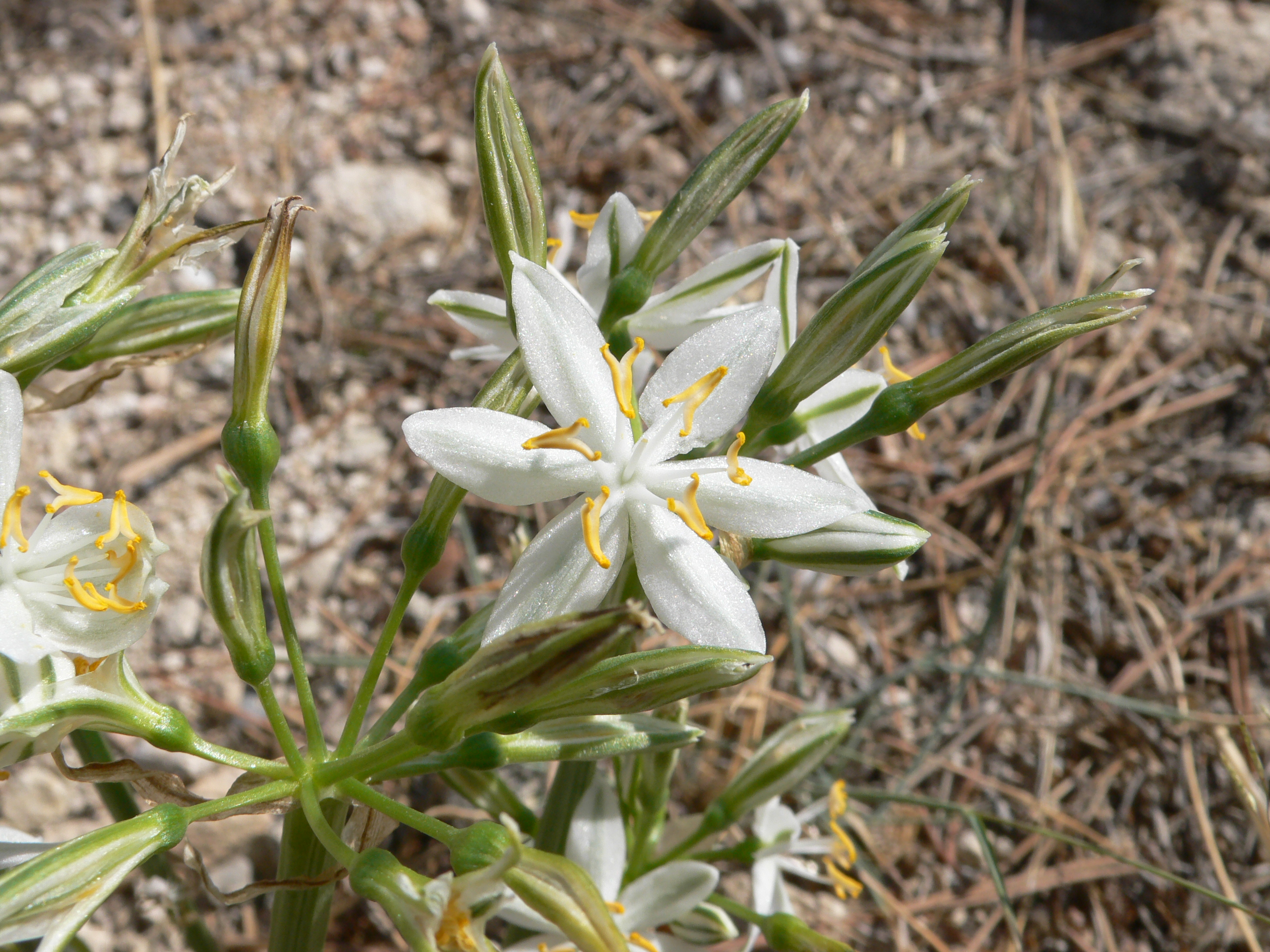

Scientific classification
- Kingdom: Plantae
- Clade: Tracheophytes
- Clade: Angiosperms
- Clade: Monocots
- Order: Asparagales
- Family: Amaryllidaceae
- Subfamily: Amaryllidoideae
- Tribe: Narcisseae
- Genus: Lapiedra; Lag.
- Species: L. martinezii

Binomial name
- Lapiedra martinezii Lag.

Synonyms
- Crinum martinezii (Lag.) Spreng.; Lapiedra placiana Herb.

= Lapiedra =

Genus of flowering plants

Lapiedra is a genus of Western Mediterranean plants in the Amaryllis family. It now contains only one known species, Lapiedra martinezii, native to Spain and Morocco.

Two other former species are considered members of other genera (Narcissus and Traubia).

- Lapiedra chilensis - Traubia modesta
- Lapiedra gracilis - Narcissus cavanillesii

== Etymology ==
The genus is named after María Josefa La Piedra (1775-1858), a Spanish botanist.

== Bibliography ==
- Rios et al. Biogeographical patterns and phenological changes in Lapiedra martinezii Lag. related to its alkaloid diversity. 2013
