= Aarhus University Press =

- Parent company: Aarhus University Research Foundation
- Founded: 1985
- Country of origin: Denmark
- Headquarters location: Aarhus
- Distribution: Gazelle Book Services (UK); ISD (United States)
- Publication types: Books, Journals
- Official website: unipress.dk

Aarhus University Press (Danish: Aarhus Universitetsforlag) is a commercial foundation, founded in 1985 by Aarhus University, Denmark. The main purpose of the press is to publish the scholarly works of researchers at the university, but many authors come from other Danish institutions of higher education and from abroad. The press not only publishes scholarly works, but also disseminates works of intellectual merit and general interest to a broad reader audience. Common to all titles is their strong scholarly base, since all books are peer-reviewed.

The University Press publishes approximately 70 new books per year and is particularly strong in archaeology, history, philosophy and literature as well as natural sciences. The press currently has more than 1,200 titles in stock of which 400 are in English and some few in German and French. The titles are sold and purposefully marketed abroad using distributors in the United Kingdom and the United States.

The press feels that the maintenance of a very high quality in graphic design, cover design, choice of paper and quality of printing, is crucial. Several press titles have been honored by the Association of Book Craftsmanship Forening for Boghaandværk and chosen to be part of their annual exhibition for the Best Book Craftsmanship Award, most recently in 2007 with the publications Sima Qian. Historiske optegnelser and Marinus. Karikaturtegner med kamera.

Additionally, a number of press titles are on commission from other publishers, among whom are: the Carlsberg Foundation (Carlsbergfondet), the National Museum (Nationalmuseet), the Centre for Alcohol and Drug Research (Center for Rusmiddelforskning), the Centre for Grundtvig Studies (Center for Grundtvigstudier), the Jutland Archaeological Society (Jysk Arkæologisk Selskab), the Historical Society of Jutland (Jysk Selskab for Historie), and the Danish Institute at Athens (Det Danske Institut i Athen).

The press is currently a member of the Association of University Presses.
