= Alan Meerow =

American botanist (born 1952)

Alan W. Meerow
- Born: 1952 (age 73–74); New York, New York, USA
- Known for: Contributions to the taxonomy of the Amaryllidaceae, horticulture of palms and tropical ornamentals
- Scientific career
- Fields: Botany, Horticulture
- Author abbrev. (botany): Meerow

Alan W. Meerow is an American botanist, born in New York City in 1952. He specializes in the taxonomy of the family Amaryllidaceae and the horticulture of palms and tropical ornamental plants. He also works on the population genetics and molecular systematics of cycads and palms.

He studied at the Bronx High School of Science and then at the University of New York. Dropping out after a year, aged 19, he moved to Santa Cruz, California. After living on a farm for four years, he decided to resume his studies in botany and horticulture at the University of California.

Initially his interest in botany was focused on trees, working for three years in the arboretum of the University. He graduated in December 1978 and continued his postgraduate study at the University of Florida, after working for two years at the Marie Selby Botanical Gardens in Sarasota, Florida, where his interest in Amaryllidaceae was stimulated. His master's thesis, in 1983, was on the taxonomy of the genus Eucharis. He continued with the same subject in his doctoral studies, producing his thesis "A Monograph of Eucharis and Caliphruria (Amaryllidaceae)" in 1986.

He then moved to the University of Florida's Fort Lauderdale Research and Education Center where he was a palm and tropical ornamental specialist. As well as carrying out research on the phylogeny and taxonomy of the Amaryllidaceae, he bred Hippeastrum and other ornamental species. In 1998 the International Bulb Society awarded him the Herbert Medal in recognition of his contributions to the knowledge of bulbous plants.

From October 1999 until July 2019, he was located at the National Germplasm Repository of the United States Department of Agriculture/Agricultural Research Service (USDA-ARS), based in Miami, working on the conservation, genetics, systematics, characterization, and breeding of species of subtropical and tropical ornamentals. In 2005, the American Society of Plant Taxonomists awarded him the Peter Raven Award for Scientific Outreach. In 2017, he was awarded the David Fairchild Medal for Plant Exploration by the National Tropical Botanical Garden. Upon retirement from USDA, Meerow became a Research Fellow of the Montgomery Botanical Center in Coral Gables, FL, and is an adjunct professor in the School of Life Sciences at Arizona State University.

== Selected publications ==
Meerow has published over 250 scientific papers, numerous magazine and university extension articles, and is the author or co-author of three popular books on palms.

- Meerow, Alan W (1986). A monograph of Eucharis and Caliphruria (Amaryllidaceae) (Ph. D. Thesis). University of Florida.
- Meerow, AW; Snijman, DA (1998). "Amaryllidaceae". Flowering Plants · Monocotyledons. pp. 83–110. doi:10.1007/978-3-662-03533-7_11. ISBN 978-3-642-08377-8. S2CID 240114483., in Kubitzki (1998). (additional excerpts)
- Meerow, Alan W.; Fay, Michael F.; Chase, Mark W.; Guy, Charles L.; Li, Qin-Bao; Snijman, Deirdre; Yang, Si-Lin (2000). Phylogeny of Amaryllidaceae: Molecules and morphology. Csiro. pp. 372–386. ISBN 9780643099296., in Wilson & Morrison (2000)
- García, Nicolás; Meerow, Alan W.; Soltis, Douglas E.; Soltis, Pamela S. (1 March 2014). "Testing Deep Reticulate Evolution in Amaryllidaceae Tribe Hippeastreae (Asparagales) with ITS and Chloroplast Sequence Data". Systematic Botany. 39 (1): 75–89. doi:10.1600/036364414X678099. S2CID 86117335.
- Meerow, A.W.; Fay, M.F.; Guy, C.L.; Li, Q.-B.; Zaman, F.Q.; Chase, M.W. (1999). "Systematics of Amaryllidaceae based on cladistic analysis of plastid rbcL and trnL-F sequence data". Am. J. Bot. 86 (9): 1325–1345. doi:10.2307/2656780. JSTOR 2656780. PMID 10487820.
- Meerow, A.W.; Guy, C.L.; Li, Q.-B.; Yang, S.-L. (2000). "Phylogeny of the American Amaryllidaceae Based on nrDNA ITS Sequences" (PDF). Systematic Botany. 25 (4): 708–726. doi:10.2307/2666729. JSTOR 2666729. S2CID 20392462. Archived from the original (PDF) on 23 September 2015.
- Meerow, Alan W.; Snijman, Deirdre A. (December 2001). "Phylogeny of Amaryllidaceae Tribe Amaryllideae Based on nrDNA ITS Sequences and Morphology". American Journal of Botany. 88 (12): 2321–2330. doi:10.2307/3558392. JSTOR 3558392. PMID 21669663. S2CID 28891491.
- Meerow, Alan W.; Guy, Charles L.; Li, Qin-Bao; Clayton, Jason R. (2002). "Phylogeny of the Tribe Hymenocallideae (Amaryllidaceae) Based on Morphology and Molecular Characters". Annals of the Missouri Botanical Garden. 89 (3): 400–413. doi:10.2307/3298600. JSTOR 3298600.
- Meerow, Alan W.; van der Werff, Henk (1 July 2004). "Pucara (Amaryllidaceae) Reduced to Synonymy with Stenomesson on the Basis of Nuclear and Plastid DNA Spacer Sequences, and a New Related Species of Stenomesson". Systematic Botany. 29 (3): 511–517. doi:10.1600/0363644041744400. S2CID 85742067.
- Meerow, AW; Francisco-Ortega, J; Schnell, RJ (2006). "Phylogenetic relationships and biogeography within the Eurasian clade of Amaryllidaceae based on plastid ndhF and nrDNA ITS sequences: lineage sorting in a reticulate area?". Systematic Botany. 31 (1): 42–60. doi:10.1600/036364406775971787. JSTOR 25064128. S2CID 85953035. Archived from the original on December 29, 2018. Full text
- Meerow, Alan W.; Snijman, Deirdre A. (2006). "The never-ending story: multigene approaches to the phylogeny of Amaryllidaceae". Aliso. 22: 355–366. doi:10.5642/aliso.20062201.29.
- Meerow, Alan W.; Reveal, James L.; Snijman, Deirdre A.; Dutilh, Julie H. (November 2007). "(1793) Proposal to conserve the name Amaryllidaceae against Alliaceae, a "superconservation" proposal". Taxon. 56 (4): 1299–1300. doi:10.2307/25065925. JSTOR 25065925.
- Meerow, Alan. Towards a phylogeny of the Amaryllidaceae. pp. 169–179., in Rudall et al. (1995)
- Meerow, A.W.; Jost, L.; Oleas, N. (2015). "Two new species of endemic Ecuadorean Amaryllidaceae (Asparagales, Amaryllidaceae, Amarylloideae, Eucharideae)". PhytoKeys (48): 1–9. doi:10.3897/phytokeys.48.4399. PMC 4408727. PMID 25931969.
- Roncal, J.; Couderc, M.; Baby, P.; Kahn, F.; Millán, B.; Meerow, A. W.; Pintaud, J-C. (2015). "Palm diversification in two geologically contrasting regions of western Amazonia". Journal of Biogeography. 42 (8): 1503–1513. doi:10.1111/jbi.12518. S2CID 83703325.
- Jestrow, B.; Peguero, B.; Jiménez, F.; Cinea, W.; Hass, M.; Reeve, A.; Meerow, A.W.; Griffith, M.P.; Maunder, M.; Francisco-Ortega, J. (2016). "Genetic diversity and differentiation of the Critically Endangered Hispaniolan palm Coccothrinax jimenezii MM Mejía & RG García based on novel SSR markers". Biochemical Systematics and Ecology. 66: 216–223. doi:10.1016/j.bse.2016.04.013.
- Leiva, S.; Meerow, A.W. (2016). "A new species of Clinanthus from northern Peru (Asparagales, Amaryllidaceae, Amarylloideae, Clinantheae)". PhytoKeys (63): 99–106. doi:10.3897/phytokeys.63.8895. PMC 4956931. PMID 27489481.
- Meerow, A.W.; Ayala-Silva, T.; Irish, B.M. (2015). "Lagerstroemia speciosa 'Big Pink': An Improved Pink-flowered Queen's Crape Myrtle". HortScience. 50 (10): 1593–1594. doi:10.21273/hortsci.50.10.1593.
- Noblick, L. R.; Meerow, A.W. (2015). "The transfer of the genus Lytocaryum to Syagrus". Palms. 59: 57–62.
- Richardson, J. E.; Whitlock, B. A.; Meerow, A. W.; Madriñán, S. (2015). "The Age of Chocolate: a biogeographic history of Theobroma and Malvaceae". Frontiers in Ecology and Evolution. 3: 120. doi:10.3389/fevo.2015.00120.
- Yeng, W. S.; Meerow, A. W.; Croat, T. B. (2016). "Resurrection and new species of the Neotropical genus Adelonema (Araceae: Philodendron Clade)" (PDF). Systematic Botany. 41: 32–48. doi:10.1600/036364416x690732. S2CID 87392060.
- Oleas, N.; Meerow, A. W.; Francisco-Ortega, J. (2016). "Genetic structure of the threatened Phaedranassa schizantha (Amaryllidaceae)". Botanical Journal of the Linnean Society. 182: 169–179. doi:10.1111/boj.12444.
- Freitas, C.; Meerow, A. W.; Pintaud, J-C.; Henderson, A.; Noblick, L.; Costa, F. R. C.; Barbosa, C. E.; Barrington, D. (2016). "Phylogenetic analysis of Attalea (Arecaceae): insights into the historical biogeography of a recently diversified Neotropical plant group". Bot. J. Linn. Soc. 182 (2): 287–302. doi:10.1111/boj.12466.
- Meerow, A. W.; Salas-Leiva, D.; Francisco-Ortega, J.; Griffith, P.; Calonje, M.; Stevenson, D.; Nakamura, K. (2017). "Phylogeography and conservation genetics of the Caribbean Zamia clade: an integrated systematic approach with SSRs and single copy nuclear genes". Memoirs of the New York Botanical Garden. 32: 309–322. doi:10.1111/1442-1984.12158.
- Meerow, A. W.; Gideon, M.; Nakamura, K. (2017). "Hybridization between ecotypes in a phenotypically and ecologically heterogeneous population of Iris savannarum (Iridaceae) in Florida". Plant Species Biology. 32 (4): 309–322. doi:10.1111/1442-1984.12158.
- Campos-Rocha, A.; Meerow, A.W.; Lopes, E.F.M.; Semir, J.; Mayer, J.L.S.; Dutilh, J.H.A. (2017). "Eithea lagopaivae, a new critically endangered species in the previously monotypic genus Eithea Ravenna (Amaryllidaceae)". PhytoKeys (85): 45–58. doi:10.3897/phytokeys.58.13369. PMC 5624176. PMID 29033659.
- Campos-Rocha, A.; Meerow, A.W.; Semir, J.; Dutilh, J.H.A. (2017). "A new species of Griffinia (Amaryllidaceae) from Espírito Santo state, Brazil, and reassessment of Griffinia concinna". Phytotaxa. 327 (2): 175–183. doi:10.11646/phytotaxa.327.2.6.
- Griffith, M.P.; Calonje, M.; Meerow, A.W.; Francisco-Ortega, J.; Knowles, L.; Aguilar, R.; Tut, F.; Sánchez, V.; Meyer, A.; Noblick, L.R.; Magellan, T.M. (2017). "Will the same ex situ protocols give similar results for closely related species?". Biodiversity and Conservation. 26 (12): 2951–2966. doi:10.1007/s10531-017-1400-2.
- Iglesias-Andreu, L.G.; Octavio-Aguilar, P.; Vovides, A.P.; Meerow, A.W.; de Cáceres-González, F.N.; Galván-Hernández, D.M. (2017). "Extinction risk of Zamia inermis (Zamiaceae): a genetic approach for the conservation of its single natural population". International Journal of Plant Sciences. 178 (9): 715–723. doi:10.1086/694080. S2CID 90842769.
- Jestrow, B., Peguero, B., Jiménez, F., Verdecia, R., González-Oliva, L., Moya, C.E., Cinea, W., Griffith, M.P., Meerow, A.W., Maunder, M. and Francisco-Ortega, J., 2017. A conservation framework for the Critically Endangered endemic species of the Caribbean palm Coccothrinax. Oryx, pp. 1–12. doi:10.1017/S0030605317000588..
- Meerow, A.W., Reed, S.T., Dunn, C. and Schnell, E., 2017. Fragrance analysis of two scented Hippeastrum species. HortScience 52: 1853–1860.
- Salas-Leiva, D. E.; Meerow, A. W.; Calonje, M.; Francisco-Ortega, J.; Griffith, M. P.; Nakamura, K.; Sánchez, V.; Knowles, L.; Knowles, D. (2017). "Shifting Quaternary migration patterns in the Bahamian archipelago: evidence from the Zamia pumila complex at the northern limits of the Caribbean island biodiversity hotspot". American Journal of Botany. 104 (5): 757–771. doi:10.3732/ajb.1700054. PMID 28515078.
- Campos-Rocha, A., A. W. Meerow & J. H. A. Dutilh. 2018. Two new critically endangered species of Hippeastrum (Amaryllidaceae) from the Brazilian Cerrado. Phytotaxa 360: 91–102.
- de Lima, N.E., Carvalho, A. A., Meerow, A. W. and Manfrin, M. H. 2018. A review of the palm genus Acrocomia: Neotropical green gold. Organism Diversity and Evolution 18: 151–161.

== Bibliography ==
- Kubitzki, K., ed. (1998). The families and genera of vascular plants. Vol.3. Berlin, Germany: Springer-Verlag. ISBN 978-3-540-64060-8.
- Wilson, K. L.; Morrison, D. A., eds. (19 May 2000). Monocots: Systematics and evolution (Proceedings of the Second International Conference on the Comparative Biology of the Monocotyledons, Sydney, Australia 1998). Collingwood, Australia: CSIRO. ISBN 978-0-643-06437-9. Excerpts
- Rudall, P.J.; Cribb, P.J.; Cutler, D.F.; Humphries, C.J., eds. (1995). Monocotyledons: systematics and evolution (Proceedings of the International Symposium on Monocotyledons: Systematics and Evolution, Kew 1993). Kew: Royal Botanic Gardens. ISBN 978-0-947643-85-0. Archived from the original on 5 January 2014.
