= Paula Rudall =

British botanist (1954- )

Paula J Rudall
- Born: 1954 (age 71–72)
- Education: University of London
- Known for: Botanical taxonomy, Comparative Plant Anatomy
- Spouse: Richard M. Bateman
- Awards: Linnaean Medal 2005; Corresponding Membership of the Botanical Society of America, 2007: Dahlgren Prizewinner in Botany, 2008; Corresponding Membership of the American Society of Plant Taxonomists (ASPT), 2012 • Distinguished Fellowship Medal from the European Society for Evolutionary Developmental Biology (EED), 2020
- Scientific career
- Fields: Botany
- Workplaces: Royal Botanic Gardens, Kew
- Author abbrev. (botany): Rudall

Paula J Rudall (born 1954) is a British botanist, who was Head of the Micromorphology Section (1999–2014) and Head of the Department of Comparative Plant and Fungal Biology at the Royal Botanic Gardens, Kew.

== Career ==
Paula Rudall has three degrees from the University of London – a BSc (Hons) in 1975, a PhD (1979) and DSc (2001). She was Head of the Micromorphology Section and subsequently Head of the Department of Comparative Plant and Fungal Biology at the Royal Botanic Gardens, Kew, based in the Jodrell Laboratory. She has received several awards, including the Linnean Medal (2005) and the Dahlgren Prize (2008). She is known for her work on the taxonomy and phylogeny of monocotyledons and was the lead organiser of the foundational international conference on Monocotyledons, systematics and evolution (Kew, 1993), which led to an ongoing international series of conferences and workshops. She is currently an Honorary Research Fellow at Royal Botanic Gardens, Kew.

Paula Rudall has published over 300 peer-reviewed papers and several books, including a textbook on the Anatomy of Flowering Plants.

Rudall featured in Sir David Attenborough’s 2000 documentary Lost Gods of Easter Island.

== Bibliography ==
https://orcid.org/0000-0002-4816-1212

- "Dr Paula J Rudall".
