= Ute Müller-Doblies =

German botanist

- Born: 1938 (age 87–88)
- Scientific career
- Fields: Botany
- Institutions: Technische Universität Berlin
- Author abbrev. (botany): U.Müll.-Doblies

Ute Müller-Doblies is a German botanist with an interest in the systematics of Amaryllidaceae. She is currently at the Herbarium of the Technische Universität Berlin in collaboration with Dietrich Müller-Doblies (D.Müll.-Doblies.).

== Selected publications ==
- K. Weichhardt-Kulessa; T. Börner; J. Schmitz; U. Müller-Doblies; D. Müller-Doblies (2000), "Controversial taxonomy of Strumariinae (Amaryllidaceae) investigated by nuclear rDNA (ITS) sequences", Plant Systematics and Evolution, 223 (1–2): 1–13, doi:10.1007/BF00985323, S2CID 34279825
- C. Neinhuis; U. Muller-Doblies; D. Muller-Doblies (1996), "Psammophora and other sand-coated plants from southern Africa", Feddes Repertorium, 107 (5–6): 549–555, doi:10.1002/fedr.19961070512
- U. Müller-Doblies; D. Müller-Doblies (2008), "A partial revision of the tribe Massonieae (Hyacinthaceae) 1. Survey, including three novelties from Namibia: A new genus, a second species in the monotypic Whiteheadia, and a new combination in Massonia", Feddes Repertorium, 108 (1–2): 49–96, doi:10.1002/fedr.19971080106
- U. Müller-Doblies; D. Müller-Doblies (1970), Über die Blütenstände und Blüten sowie zur Embryologie von Sparganium, Editor Naturwiss
