= Dietrich Müller-Doblies =

German botanist

Dietrich Müller-Doblies (born 1938) is a German systematic botanist. His main areas of interest are the Bryophyta, the Spermatophyta, the Monocotyledons, Amaryllidaceae, Colchicaceae and Hyacinthaceae. He is currently at the Herbarium of the Technische Universität Berlin Most of his botanical writings are in conjunction with Ute Müller-Doblies, whose author abbreviation is U.Müll.-Doblies, however most taxa named by them bear both names, signified by D.Müll.-Doblies & U.Müll.-Doblies or D. & U. M.-D. and sometimes D. et U. M.-D..

== Works ==
- Übersichtlicher Bestimmungsschlüssel der wichtigeren krautigen Blütenplanzenfamilien der mitteleuropäischen Flora, 1966
- Die Moose von Berlin und Montpellier : ein statistischer Vergleich zwischen mitteleuropäischem und mediterranem Florengebiet am Beispiel zweier Lokalfloren, 1976
