= Aliso (journal) =

- Discipline: Botany
- Language: English

Publication details
- History: 1948–present
- Publisher: Rancho Santa Ana Botanic Garden (United States)
- Open access: Delayed one year

Standard abbreviations
- ISO 4: Aliso

Indexing
- ISSN: 0065-6275 (print); 2327-2929 (web)

Links
- Journal homepage

Aliso: A Journal of Systematic and Evolutionary Botany is a peer-reviewed scientific journal that publishes original research on plant taxonomy and evolutionary botany with a worldwide scope, but with a particular focus on the floristics of the Western United States. Aliso, first published in 1948, is the scientific journal of the Rancho Santa Ana Botanic Garden. The journal is named for the western sycamore, Platanus racemosa, which was commonly called by its Spanish name aliso.

It is noted as the journal where Robert F. Thorne first published the Thorne system of flowering plant classification in 1968.
