= American Journal of Botany =

Peer-reviewed scientific journal

- Discipline: Botany
- Language: English
- Edited by: Pamela Diggle

Publication details
- History: 1914–present
- Publisher: Botanical Society of America (United States)
- Frequency: Monthly
- Impact factor: 3.325 (2021)

Standard abbreviations
- ISO 4: Am. J. Bot.

Indexing
- CODEN: AJBOAA
- ISSN: 0002-9122 (print); 1537-2197 (web)
- LCCN: 17005518
- JSTOR: 00029122
- OCLC no.: 475054649

Links
- Journal homepage

The American Journal of Botany is a monthly peer-reviewed scientific journal which covers all aspects of plant biology. It has been published by the Botanical Society of America since 1914. The journal has an impact factor of 3.038, as of 2019. As of 2018, access is available through the publisher John Wiley & Sons (Wiley). From 1951 to 1953, Oswald Tippo served as its editor; the current editor is Pamela Diggle.

== History ==
In the early 20th century, the field of botany was rapidly expanding, but the publications in which botanists could publish remained limited and heavily backlogged. By 1905, it was estimated that 250,000 contributions were generated in 8 or 9 languages. At the 1911 annual meeting of the society in Washington D.C., it was noted that at least 300 pages of American botanical contributions were sent abroad for publication, with a backlog resulting in a one-year delay in publication.

On 31 December 1907, the Botanical Society of America met in Chicago and formally recommended forming a committee as an "aid to publication". The original form of the unspecified publication was a pocket edition of the constitution of the society, but it soon turned to other endeavours. In 1908, it published special addresses on popular topics, as well as lectures given at the Darwin Memorial Session in 1909, in honor of the centenary of Charles Darwin's birth and the 50th anniversary of the publication of On the Origin of Species. It was also in 1909 that the committee was officially named as the "Committee on Botanical Publication". Its task was to determine the need for a formal journal, published by the society, and how the journal would be published. However, at the subsequent annual meeting in Minneapolis, the committee failed to file a report, and was discharged.

At the same meeting, a new committee of three members, headed by Frederick Charles Newcombe, a professor of botany at the University of Michigan, was formed. Newcombe had trained in Germany, given the limited educational opportunities in the United States at the time, and founded the Botanical Journal Club at the University of Michigan. He had expressed concerns, as early as 1895, about the dearth of high-quality American botanical journals that could compare to German ones such as Botanische Zeitung (published 1843-1910). In 1910, Newcombe began an extensive letter-writing campaign to drum up support of the proposed journal among botanist colleagues.
