= EMonocot =

English database of biodiversity data

eMonocot
- Website type: Botanical resource
- Available in: English
- Owners: Royal Botanical Gardens, Kew; University of Oxford; Natural History Museum; Natural Environment Research Council
- Website: e-monocot.org/about
- Commercial: No
- Launched: 2010

eMonocot was a collaborative global, online, biodiversity information resource provided by a number of botanical organisations to create a database on Monocotyledons (20% of all flowering plants).

== History ==
Participating institutions, all in England, included the Royal Botanical Gardens at Kew, the University of Oxford, the Natural History Museum and the Natural Environment Research Council (NERC). The project was led by Kew with a £1 million grant by the NERC.

Funding of the project, which included information on over 250,000 taxa, was provided through NERC. Taxonomists from around the world contributed data, although the backbone of the resource was the World Checklist of Selected Plant Families. Data was imported and compiled from a large number of international databases and resources. By 2017, 70,000 monocotyledons were collected in the database. In 2017, Plants of the World Online superseded eMonocot, which built on the project's work.

== See also ==
- Plants of the World Online
