= Systematic Botany =

Peer-reviewed scientific journal

- Discipline: Botany
- Language: English
- Edited by: James F. Smith

Publication details
- History: 1976–present
- Publisher: American Society of Plant Taxonomists (United States)
- Frequency: Quarterly
- Impact factor: 1.897 (2010)

Standard abbreviations
- ISO 4: Syst. Bot.

Indexing
- CODEN: SYBODA
- ISSN: 0363-6445 (print); 1548-2324 (web)
- LCCN: 76646396
- JSTOR: 03636445
- OCLC no.: 2531771

Links
- Journal homepage; Online access at BioOne; Online access at IngentaConnect

Systematic Botany is a peer-reviewed scientific journal covering the study of systematic botany. It is published quarterly by the American Society of Plant Taxonomists. According to the Journal Citation Reports, the journal has a 2010 impact factor of 1.897.

Systematic Botany was established in spring 1976 under founding editor-in-chief William Louis Culberson (Duke University). The current editor-in-chief is James F. Smith (Boise State University).

The American Society of Plant Taxonomists also publishes the peer-reviewed taxonomic monograph series, Systematic Botany Monographs since 1980.

== Abstracting and indexing ==
Systematic Botany is abstracted and indexed in Agricola, Agris, BioOne, PubMed, Scirus, and Science Citation Index Expanded.
