= Mark Wayne Chase =

British botanist (born 1951)

Mark Wayne Chase FRS (born 1951) is a US-born British botanist. He is noted for work in plant classification and evolution, and one of the instigators of the Angiosperm Phylogeny Group-classification for flowering plants which is partly based on DNA studies. In particular he has researched orchids, and currently investigates ploidy and hybridization in Nicotiana.

In 1984, he received 'The George H.M. Lawrence Memorial Award', in the amount of $2,000, presented by the Hunt Institute for Botanical Documentation, Carnegie Mellon University and presented at the annual banquet of the Botanical Society of America.

In 1998 he shared the Linnean Medal with Colin Patterson. In 2008 he was one of thirteen recipients of the Darwin-Wallace Medal, which was given every 50 years by the Linnean Society of London. He was the Keeper of the Jodrell Laboratory; he is now retired but still an honorary research associate at the Royal Botanic Gardens, Kew. He is a Fellow of the Royal Society.

He was awarded the Veitch Memorial Medal of the Royal Horticultural Society in 2014.

== Selected publications ==
- Mark W. Chase; Steven Dodsworth; Maarten J. M. Christenhusz (14 August 2021). "989. NICOTIANA WALPA: Solanaceae". Curtis's Botanical Magazine (in Spanish). 38 (3): 298–308. doi:10.1111/CURT.12396. ISSN 1355-4905. Wikidata Q110857857.
- Mark W. Chase; Rachel A. Przeslawski; Liam E. Falvey; Michael F. Fay; Maarten J. M. Christenhusz (14 August 2021). "997. NICOTIANA MURCHISONICA: Solanaceae". Curtis's Botanical Magazine (in Spanish). 38 (3): 383–393. doi:10.1111/CURT.12405. ISSN 1355-4905. Wikidata Q110857861.
- Victoria Sosa; Mark W Chase (2003). "Phylogenetics of Crossosomataceae Based on rbcL Sequence Data". Systematic Botany. 28: 96–105. ISSN 0363-6445. JSTOR 3093940. Wikidata Q95467154.
- M. F. Fay; R. G. Olmstead; J. E. Richardson; E. Santiago; G. T. Prance; M. W. Chase (1998). "Molecular Data Support the Inclusion of Duckeodendron cestroides in Solanaceae". Kew Bulletin. 53 (1): 203. doi:10.2307/4110460. ISSN 0075-5974. JSTOR 4110460. Wikidata Q93617623.
- Ovidiu Paun; Félix Forest; Michael F Fay; Mark W Chase (11 February 2008). "Hybrid speciation in angiosperms: parental divergence drives ploidy". New Phytologist. 182 (2): 507–518. doi:10.1111/J.1469-8137.2009.02767.X. ISSN 0028-646X. PMC 2988484. PMID 19220761. Wikidata Q41711070.
- Yanis Bouchenak-Khelladi; Nicolas Salamin; Vincent Savolainen; Felix Forest; Michelle van der Bank; Mark W Chase; Trevor R Hodkinson (9 February 2008). "Large multi-gene phylogenetic trees of the grasses (Poaceae): progress towards complete tribal and generic level sampling". Molecular Phylogenetics and Evolution. 47 (2): 488–505. doi:10.1016/J.YMPEV.2008.01.035. ISSN 1055-7903. PMID 18358746. Wikidata Q34764053.

== Taxa named by Mark Chase ==
See Taxa named by Mark Wayne Chase.
