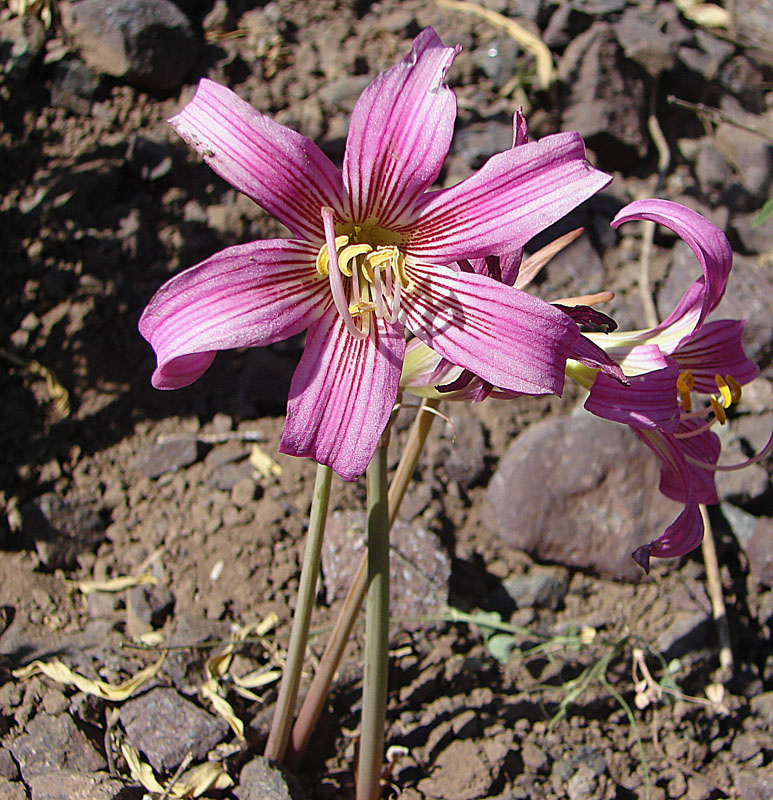
- Rhodolirium montanum

Scientific classification
- Kingdom: Plantae
- Clade: Tracheophytes
- Clade: Angiosperms
- Clade: Monocots
- Order: Asparagales
- Family: Amaryllidaceae
- Subfamily: Amaryllidoideae
- Subtribe: Traubiinae
- Genus: Rhodolirium; Phil.

Type species
- Rhodolirium montanum Phil.

Species
- Rhodolirium andicola; Rhodolirium chilense; Rhodolirium fulgens; Rhodolirium laetum; Rhodolirium montanum; Rhodolirium speciosum

Synonyms
- Rhodophiala C.Presl; Rhodolirion

= Rhodolirium =

Genus of flowers

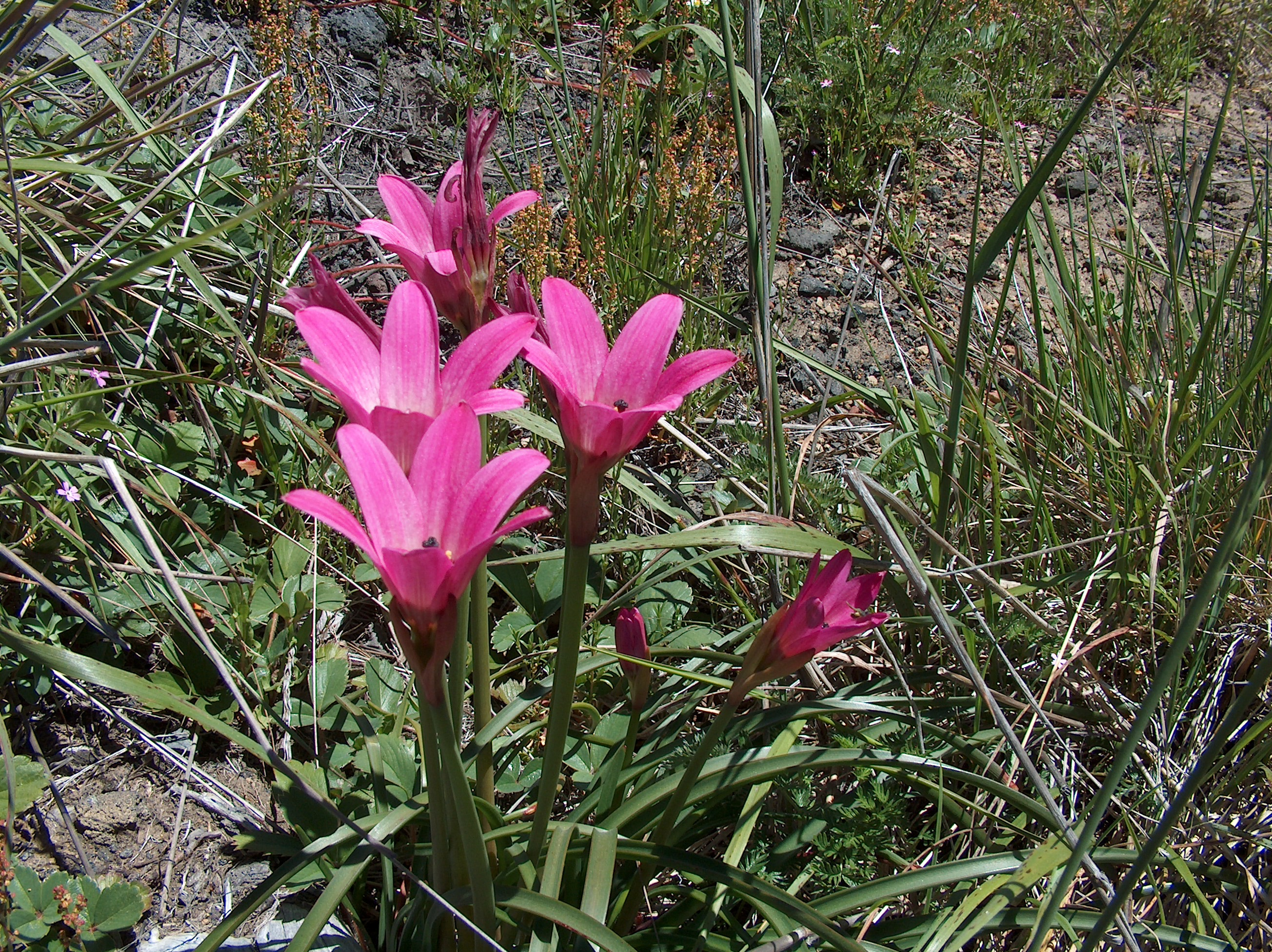
Rhodolirium andicola

Rhodolirium is a small South American genus in the tribe Hippeastreae of the family Amaryllidaceae. Although originally described by Philippi in 1858 it has long remained buried in other taxa, principally Hippeastrum and more recently Rhodophiala. Only in recent years has it been rehabilitated.

Restoring the genus was first proposed by Naranjo & Poggio (2000), and accepted by Ravenna in 2003, although he used the name Rhodolirion, originally used by Baker (1878) in his very broad construction of Hippeastrum including both Rhodophiala and "Rhodolirion". He also renamed Rhodolirium andinum as Hippeastrum rhodolirion. Later he elevated Rhodolirion to the status of subgenus, with H. rhodolirion (subsequently Rhodophiala rhodolirion) as the type species . Subsequently, the genus has been treated as part of Rhodophiala.

== Description ==
Flowers single or pluriflor, perigone infundibular (funnel shaped) with elongated floral tube. Paraperigonium, if present, has free segments. Stigma capitate.

== Taxonomy ==
For early treatment of Rhodolirium, see Taxonomy of Hippeastrum. The rehabilitation has yet (as of February 2016) to be recognised by the World Checklist of Selected Plant Families, but is by the Missouri Botanical Gardens, with six species. The ability to resolve phylogenetic relationships based solely on morphological data is limited in the Amaryllidaceae, necessitating the use of molecular methods in addition. In their study of the American amaryllidaceae, Meerow et al. (2000) noted that Rhodophiala was polyphyletic.

Subsequently, Munoz et al. undertook a detailed study of Rhodophiala/Rhodolirium species and related genera and confirmed the genus as circumscribed was indeed polyphyletic with three species segregating as a sister group to Phycella which they proposed to resurrect as genus Rhodolirium, while the remainder of the species segregated in a separate clade more closely associated with Hippeastrum, which they proposed as Rhodophiala sensu stricto. When the morphology of the two groups thus identified was examined they were distinguishable by Rodophiala having a trifid stigma compared to capitate for Rhodolirium, by the nature of the paraperigon segments, and by their chromosome numbers (2n=18 for Rhodophiala and 16 for Rhodolirium) and their chromosome symmetry. Both groups appeared to be monophyletic and their differences sufficient to justify separation into two distinct genera. Rhodophiala and Hippeastrum appeared sufficiently close to explain their treatment as a single genus in older classifications, but their separation was consistent with the study by Meerow et al.

The proposal to separate the two genera supports Ravenna's morphological studies, with Rhodolirium montanum (formerly Rhodophiala rhodolirion) as the type species for the new genus. Subsequent phylogenetic analysis by Garcia et al. (2014) confirmed this distinction between the genera and proposed dividing Hipppeastrea into two subtribes, Hippeastrinae and Traubiinae, placing Rhodophiala in the first and Rhodolirium in the second.

=== Subdivision ===
Five to six species.

- Rhodolirium andicola (Poepp.) Ravenna syn. Rhodophiala andicola (Chile to Argentina (Neuquén))
- Rhodolirium chilense (L'Hér.) Ravenna syn. Rhodophiala chilensis (Chile)
- Rhodolirium fulgens
- Rhodolirium laetum (Phil.) Ravenna syn. Rhodophiala pratensis (Northern and Central Chile)
- Rhodolirium montanum Phil. syn. Rhodophiala rhodolirion (Chile to Argentina (Mendoza))
- Rhodolirium speciosum (Herb.) Ravenna

== Distribution and habitat ==
From northern Chile, in coastal vegetation zones to Osorno province in the south, at altitudes of 150–2500 m. Also in Argentina.

== Bibliography ==
- Philippi, R.A. (1858). "Plantarum novarum chilensium. Centuria quinta". Linnaea. 29: 65–66.
- García, Nicolás; Meerow, Alan W.; Soltis, Douglas E.; Soltis, Pamela S. (1 March 2014). "Testing Deep Reticulate Evolution in Amaryllidaceae Tribe Hippeastreae (Asparagales) with ITS and Chloroplast Sequence Data". Systematic Botany. 39 (1): 75–89. doi:10.1600/036364414X678099. S2CID 86117335.
- —; Meerow, Alan W.; Arroyo-Leuenberger, Silvia; Oliveira, Renata S.; Dutilh, Julie H.; Soltis, Pamela S.; Judd, Walter S. (June 2019). "Generic classification of Amaryllidaceae tribe Hippeastreae". Taxon. 68 (3): 481–498. doi:10.1002/tax.12062. S2CID 202854432.(With corrections published 2020)
- Muñoz, Manuel; Riegel, Ricardo; Seemann, Peter; Peñailillo, Patricio; Schiappacasse, Flavia; Núñez, José (2011). "Relaciones filogenéticas de Rhodolirium montanum Phil. y especies afines, basadas en secuencias nucleotídicas de la región ITS y análisis cariotípico". Gayana. Botánica. 68 (1): 40–48. doi:10.4067/S0717-66432011000100005.
- Naranjo, C.A.; Andrada, B. (1975). "El cariotipo fundamental del género Hippeastrum Herb. (Amaryllidaceae)". Darwiniana. 19: 556–582.
- Ravenna, P. (2003). "Elucidation and systematics of the Chilean genera of Amaryllidaceae". Botanica Australis. 2: 1–20.
- Baker, J.G. (1878). Trimen, Henry (ed.). "An enumeration and classification of the species of Hippeastrum". Journal of Botany, British and Foreign. 16. London: West, Newman & Company: 79–85.
- Baker, John Gilbert (1888). "Hippeastrum". Handbook of the Amaryllideæ including the Alstrœmerieæ and Agaveæ. London: Bell. p. 41.
- "Tropicos". Missouri Botanical Garden. 2015.
- "World Checklist of Selected Plant Families". Royal Botanic Gardens, Kew.
- Meerow, A.W.; Guy, C.L.; Li, Q.-B.; Yang, S.-L. (2000). "Phylogeny of the American Amaryllidaceae Based on nrDNA ITS Sequences" (PDF). Systematic Botany. 25 (4): 708–726. doi:10.2307/2666729. JSTOR 2666729. S2CID 20392462. Archived from the original (PDF) on 23 September 2015.
