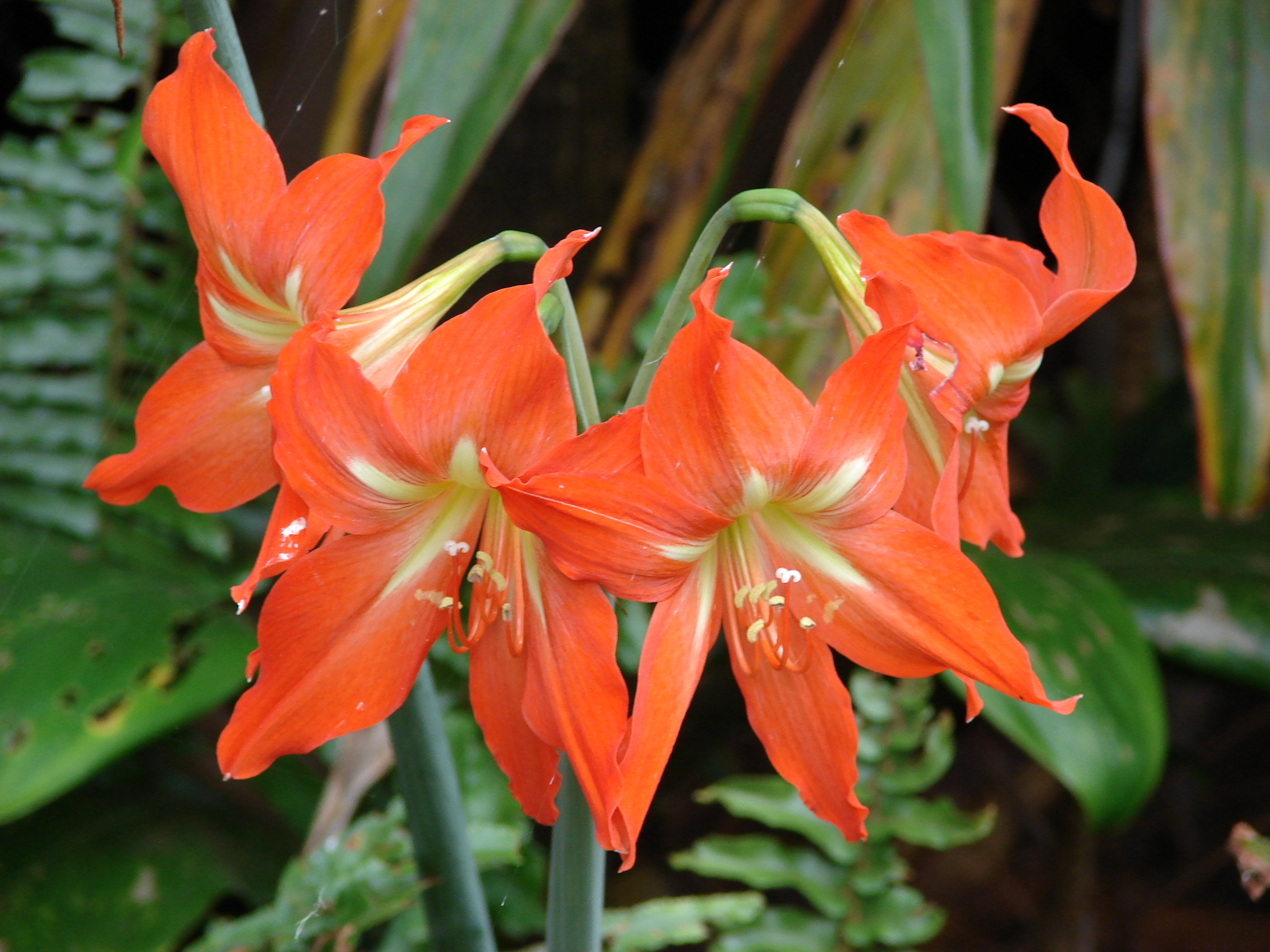
- Hippeastrum striatum

Scientific classification
- Kingdom: Plantae
- Clade: Tracheophytes
- Clade: Angiosperms
- Clade: Monocots
- Order: Asparagales
- Family: Amaryllidaceae
- Subfamily: Amaryllidoideae
- Tribe: Hippeastreae; Herb. ex Sweet

Type genus
- Hippeastrum (L.) Herb.

Subtribes
- Hippeastrinae Walp.; Traubiinae D. & U. Müll.-Doblies

= Hippeastreae =

Tribe of flowering plants

Hippeastreae is a tribe of plants belonging to the subfamily Amaryllidoideae of the Amaryllis family (Amaryllidaceae). Species in this tribe are distributed in South America. Flowers are large and showy, zygomorphic, with the stamens in varying lengths, inflorescence bracts are often fused basally (along one side). The seeds are flattened, winged or D-shaped. Reported basic chromosome numbers are x= 8-13, 17, and higher. All the species in this tribe present a remarkable aesthetic interest and horticultural value.

== Taxonomy ==
Meerow et al. (1999) provide a history of the treatment of the genera of Amaryllidaceae, including Hippeastreae, from the mid-twentieth century. While morphological phylogeny has been frustrated by the perversive homoplasy typical of the Amaryllidaceae, application of molecular phylogenetics to the Amaryllidaceae did not indicate clear tribal divisions but rather broad biogeographical clades. However the American clade resolved the tribe Hippeastreae. A later examination of the deeper relationships of the American genera suggested the two subclades, Andean and hippeastroid and within the latter separated the Brazilian Griffineae as sister to the remaining hippeastroids. The larger and more diverse grouping of hippeastroids formed two smaller monophyletic groups. The smaller contained Hippeastrum (with the exception of Hippeastrum blumenavium), (Note: Hippeastrum blumenavium, or Hippeastrum blumenavia, was earlier known as Griffinia blumenavia and is an unusual species more closely resembling Rhodophiala. Ultimately Meerow et al. recommended reassigning it to a monotypic genus, where it is now known as Eithea.) but also a Rhodophiala. With the exception of Rodophilia (Brazil) all specimens were from Chile and Argentina. The second group corresponded to those genera variously included in tribe Zephyrantheae (Traub) or subtribe Zephyranthinae (Müller-Doblies), but only including some Zephyranthes species. The hippeastroid clade is predominantly diploid and extra-Andean by comparison to the Andean clade which is predominantly tetraploid, and contain those genera traditionally included in Hippeastreae. The precise position of Griffineae remained unresolved since its sister status to Hippeastrae was weak, leaving the possibility that it could be sister to the whole American clade. The tribe consists of 10–13 genera and about 180 species.

=== Phylogeny ===
The placement of Hippeastreae within subfamily Amaryllidoideae is shown in the following cladogram, where this tribe is shown as a sister group to the Griffineae, forming the Hippeastroid subclade, of two American clades:

Cladogram: Tribes of subfamily Amaryllidoideae

- Subfamily Amaryllidoideae
  - Africa
    Tribe Amaryllideae
  - - - Africa
        Tribe Cyrtantheae
      - - Africa
          Tribe Haemantheae
        - Australasia
          Tribe Calostemmateae
    - - Eurasian clade
        - Asia
          Tribe Lycorideae
        - Mediterranean
          - Tribe Galantheae
          - - Tribe Pancratieae
            - Tribe Narcisseae
      - American clade
        - Hippeastroid clade
          - Brazil
            Tribe Griffineae
          - Tribe Hippeastreae
        - Andean clade
          - - Tribe Eustephieae
          - - Petiolate
              Tribe Eucharideae/Stenomesseae
            - - - Tribe Clinantheae
                - Tribe Hymenocallideae

=== Subdivision ===
The genera of the tribe Hippeastreae have been treated in a number of different ways over the years. Traub (1963) in his monograph on the Amaryllidacea distributed those genera now considered in this tribe over a number of other tribes (see Table, below), while Dahlgren et al. included them all under Hippeastrae for the first time. The concept of subtribes came from the Müller-Doblies' (1996), who had three subtribes, Griffinineae, Hippeastrinae and Zephyranthinae.

Consequently, it has been customary to describe the tribe Hippeastreae as consisting of two subtribes:

- subtribe Hippeastrinae - includes species of medium height and often with many flowers in each inflorescence and inflorescence bracts are different in size and fused basally. Genera that have been placed in this subtribe include Placea, Hippeastrum, Phycella (includes Famatina), Eithea, Rhodophiala, and Traubia. (Some authors use the spelling Hippeastrineae)
- subtribe Zephyranthinae - includes species of small height with solitary flowers. Inflorescence bracts are fused forming a tube surrounding the pedicel of the flower. Genera in this subtribe are Sprekelia, Habranthus, Cooperia, and Zephyranthes. (Some authors use the spelling Zephyranthinea)

In the study of Meerow et al. (2000) based on molecular markers Zephyranthinae (Zephyranthae of Traub) were clearly polyphyletic, largely due to the polyphyly of Zephyranthes itself. This subgroup has been broadly characterised as having a chromosome number, x=6, but with considerable variation. Other polyphyletic genera included Rodophiala and Habranthus. Hippeastreae also include Haylockia, Rhodolirion and Tocantinia.

A more focused study of Hippeastreae alone in 2014, resolved two major clades:

- Clade A: Traubia, Placea, Phycella, Rhodolirium, and Famatina maulensis (now Phycella maulensis)
- Clade B: Rhodophiala, Habranthus, Haylockia, Hippeastrum, Sprekelia, Zephyranthes, and the remainder of Famatina.

However it also showed that of the 13 genera, two are monotypic (Haylockia and Traubia). Of the remaining 11 genera, based on Internal transcribed spacer (ITS) sequences the only monophyletic non-monotypic genera were Hippeastrum (about 60 species) and Sprekelia (2 species). But on chloroplast DNA (cpDNA) analysis, not even these genera were monophyletic. This brings into question the existing generic classification within Hippeastreae. Consequently, the authors proposed the following nomenclature:

- Subtribe Traubiinae (Clade A) D.Müll.-Doblies & U.Müll.-Doblies
- Subtribe Hippeastrinae (Clade B)

A major generic recircumscription was published in 2019, although the basic subdivision into the two above subtribes remained unchanged.

==== Subtribes ====
Subtribe Traubiinae D. & U. Müll.-Doblies (Clade A) includes about 20 endemic Chilean taxa, but only about 10% of the species within tribe Hippeastreae. Characterisation includes a haploid chromosome number, x=8, lack of polyploidy and a capitate stigma. This subtribe has 4 genera.

Subtribe Hippeastrinae Walp. (Clade B), by contrast has a variable chromosome number, x=6–11, with frequent aneuploidy and polyploidy. Although there are no unique synapomorphies, most taxa exhibit a trifid or trilobed stigma, although in a few it is capitate. This subtribe has 2 genera.

==== Historical circumscription ====
Tribe Hippeastreae has included various numbers of genera over the years, some of which were monotypic.

Historical distribution of Hippeastreae (sensu Meerow 1999) genera by tribes and subtribes
Genus (alphabetical)	Traub 1963	Dahlgren 1985	Müller-Doblies 1996	Meerow 1998	Garcia 2014	Species
Eithea formerly Hippeastrum blumenavium					Hippeastreae; Hippeastrinae	1–2
Famatina =Rhodophiala, Phycella						4
Griffinia	Euchareae		Hippeastreae; Griffiniinae	Hippeastreae	Griffineae	21
Habranthus	Zephyrantheae	Hippeastreae	Hippeastreae; Zephyranthinae	Hippeastreae	Hippeastreae; Hippeastrinae	40
Haylockia	Zephyrantheae		Hippeastreae; Zephyranthinae	=Zephyranthes	=Zephyranthes	1
Hippeastrum	=Amaryllis	Hippeastreae	Hippeastreae; Hippeastrinae	Hippeastreae	Hippeastreae; Hippeastrinae	60
Phycella	Eustephieae			Hippeastreae	Hippeastreae; Traubiinae	6
Placea	Amarylleae	Hippeastreae	Hippeastreae; Hippeastrinae	Hippeastreae	Hippeastreae; Traubiinae	6
Sprekelia	Zephyrantheae	Hippeastreae	Hippeastreae; Zephyranthinae	Hippeastreae	Hippeastreae; Hippeastrinae	2
Rhodolirium	=Rhodophiala				Hippeastreae; Traubiinae	5
Rhodophiala	Zephyrantheae	Hippeastreae	Hippeastreae; Hippeastrinae	Hippeastreae	Hippeastreae; Hippeastrinae	8
Tocantinia					Hippeastreae; Hippeastrinae	1–2
Traubia	Traubieae		Hippeastreae; Traubiinae	Hippeastreae	Hippeastreae; Traubiinae	1
Worsleya	Amarylleae	Hippeastreae		Hippeastreae	Griffineae	1
Zephyranthes	Zephyrantheae	Hippeastreae	Hippeastreae; Zephyranthinae	Hippeastreae	Hippeastreae; Hippeastrinae	50

==== Genera ====
As of March 2022, the Angiosperm Phylogeny Website (APweb) accepted only six genera in the tribe Hippeastrae: shown here as amended by Garcia et al 2019.

- Subtribe Traubiinae:
  - Eremolirion Nic.Garcia (now Paposoa)
  - Phycella Lindlley
  - Pyrolirion Herbert (now part of a separate tribe, Eustephieae)
  - Rhodolirium s.str. Phil.
  - Traubia Moldenke
- Subtribe Hippeastrinae
  - Hippeastrum Herbert
  - Zephyranthes Herbert

Genera that have been synonymized with other genera in the tribe according to APweb include:

- Cooperia Herbert = Zephyranthes
- Famatina Ravenna = Zephyranthes
- Habranthus Herbert = Zephyranthes
- Haylockia Herbert = Zephyranthes
- Placea Miers = Phycella
- Rhodolirium Philippi = Phycella
- Rhodophiala C. Presl = Phycella
- Sprekelia Heister = Zephyranthes
- Tocantina Ravenna = Hippeastrum

== Distribution and habitat ==
Hippeastreae have a major center of diversification in central Chile and western (Andean) Argentina, together with minor centres in eastern Brazil, the north east of Argentina and with more distant centers in Mexico, the Greater Antilles and southern United States (Habranthus, Zephyranthes).

== Uses ==
The economic significance of the tribe lies in its horticultural usage.

== Bibliography ==
=== Books ===
- Dahlgren, R.M.; Clifford, H.T.; Yeo, P.F. (1985). The families of the monocotyledons. Berlin: Springer-Verlag. ISBN 978-3-642-64903-5.
- García Berguecio, Nicolás (2015). Systematics and evolution of Amaryllidaceae tribe Hippeastreae (Asparagales) (PDF) (PhD Thesis). University of Florida. Archived from the original (PDF) on 2015-09-07.
- Hutchinson, John. The families of flowering plants, arranged according to a new system based on their probable phylogeny (1st ed.). Macmillan.
  - Volume 1: Monocotyledonae (1926)
  - Volume 2: Dicotyledonae (1934)
- Kubitzki, K., ed. (1998). Flowering Plants · Monocotyledons: Lilianae (except Orchidaceae). The families and genera of vascular plants. Vol. 3. Berlin: Springer-Verlag. ISBN 978-3-540-64060-8.
- Meerow, A.W.; Snijman, D.A. "Amaryllidaceae". In Kubitzki (1998), pp. 83–110. doi:10.1007/978-3-662-03533-7_11 (excerpts)
- Traub, H.P. (1963). Genera of the Amaryllidaceae. La Jolla, California: American Plant Life Society.

=== Articles ===
- García, Nicolás; Meerow, Alan W.; Soltis, Douglas E.; Soltis, Pamela S. (1 March 2014). "Testing Deep Reticulate Evolution in Amaryllidaceae Tribe Hippeastreae (Asparagales) with ITS and Chloroplast Sequence Data". Systematic Botany. 39 (1): 75–89. Bibcode:2014SysBo..39...75G. doi:10.1600/036364414X678099. S2CID 86117335.
- —; Folk, Ryan A.; Meerow, Alan W.; Chamala, Srikar; Gitzendanner, Matthew A.; Oliveira, Renata Souza de; Soltis, Douglas E.; Soltis, Pamela S. (June 2017). "Deep reticulation and incomplete lineage sorting obscure the diploid phylogeny of rain-lilies and allies (Amaryllidaceae tribe Hippeastreae)". Molecular Phylogenetics and Evolution. 111: 231–247. Bibcode:2017MolPE.111..231G. doi:10.1016/j.ympev.2017.04.003. PMID 28390909.
- —; Meerow, Alan W.; Arroyo-Leuenberger, Silvia; Oliveira, Renata S.; Dutilh, Julie H.; Soltis, Pamela S.; Judd, Walter S. (June 2019). "Generic classification of Amaryllidaceae tribe Hippeastreae". Taxon. 68 (3): 481–498. Bibcode:2019Taxon..68..481G. doi:10.1002/tax.12062. S2CID 202854432.(With corrections published 2020)
- Meerow, A.W.; Fay, M.F.; Guy, C.L.; Li, Q.-B.; Zaman, F.Q.; Chase, M.W. (1999). "Systematics of Amaryllidaceae based on cladistic analysis of plastid rbcL and trnL-F sequence data". Am. J. Bot. 86 (9): 1325–1345. doi:10.2307/2656780. JSTOR 2656780. PMID 10487820.
- —; Guy, C.L.; Li, Q.-B.; Yang, S.-L. (2000). "Phylogeny of the American Amaryllidaceae Based on nrDNA ITS Sequences" (PDF). Systematic Botany. 25 (4): 708–726. Bibcode:2000SysBo..25..708M. doi:10.2307/2666729. JSTOR 2666729. S2CID 20392462. Archived from the original (PDF) on 2015-09-23.
- —; Gardner, Elliot M.; Nakamura, Kyoko (5 November 2020). "Phylogenomics of the Andean Tetraploid Clade of the American Amaryllidaceae (Subfamily Amaryllidoideae): Unlocking a Polyploid Generic Radiation Abetted by Continental Geodynamics". Frontiers in Plant Science. 11 582422. Bibcode:2020FrPS...1182422M. doi:10.3389/fpls.2020.582422. PMC 7674842. PMID 33250911.
- Müller-Doblies, U.; Müller-Doblies, D. (1996). "Tribes and subtribes and some species combinations in Amaryllidaceae J St Hil R Dahlgren & al. 1985". Feddes Repertorium. 107 (5–6): S.c.1–S.c.9.

=== Websites ===
- Stevens, P.F. (2001–2012), Angiosperm Phylogeny Website: Amaryllidoideae
- Vigneron, Pascal (2008). "Amaryllidaceae". Amaryllidaceae.org (in French). Archived from the original on 2015-01-04.
- GRIN (2016). "GRIN Taxonomy for Plants". Germplasm Resources Information Network.
- "Amaryllidaceae: A taxonomic tool for the Amaryllidaceae of the world". eMonocot. Archived from the original on 2016-03-04.
