= Zephyrantheae =

Obsolete taxonomical tribe

Zephyrantheae Salisb. is a now obsolete tribe within the American clade of family Amaryllidaceae (subfamily Amaryllidoideae), containing five genera (Habranthus, Pyrolirion, Rhodophiala, Sprekelia, Zephyranthes).

== Description ==
corona absent, stem leafless, ovules many, perianth tube present, flowers solitary or paired.

== Taxonomy ==
Richard Anthony Salisbury in his original description in 1866, defined the Zephyrantheae as an 'Order' with two sections and a number of subgroups, such as Omphalissa.

The composition has varied, given the considerable rearrangements of the Amaryllidaceae that have taken place. For instance Hickey and Clive (1997) describe the Zephyrantheae as being one of ten tribes by which the Amaryllidaceae are divided, allocating Zephyranthes and Sternbergia to this tribe, while Traub (1952) included Habranthus. Other genera that have been placed in this tribe include Cooperia, Haylockia, Apodolirion, and Gethyllis.

In his 1963 monograph on Amaryllidaceae, Traub lists six species, Rhodophiala, Haylockia, Pyrolirion, Zephyranthes, Habranthus and Sprekelia. Meerow et al. (1999) provides an account (Table 1) of the subsequent rearrangement of Traub's genera, and of the modern molecular based phylogeny (see also Taxonomy of Amaryllidoideae).

== Bibliography ==
- Meerow, A.W.; Fay, M.F.; Guy, C.L.; Li, Q.-B.; Zaman, F.Q.; Chase, M.W. (1999). "Systematics of Amaryllidaceae based on cladistic analysis of plastid rbcL and trnL-F sequence data". Am. J. Bot. 86 (9): 1325–1345. doi:10.2307/2656780. JSTOR 2656780. PMID 10487820.
- Meerow, A.W.; Guy, C.L.; Li, Q.-B.; Yang, S.-L. (2000). "Phylogeny of the American Amaryllidaceae Based on nrDNA ITS Sequences". Systematic Botany. 25 (4): 708–726. doi:10.2307/2666729. JSTOR 2666729. S2CID 20392462. Archived from the original on April 8, 2013.
- Traub, Hamilton P. (November 1952). "Biosystematic Experiments Involving Zephyranthes, Habranthus and Amaryllis". Taxon. 1 (8): 121–123. doi:10.2307/1216549. JSTOR 1216549.
- Traub, H.P. (1963). Genera of the Amaryllidaceae. Genera of organisms. La Jolla, California: American Plant Life Society.

=== Walter Samuel Flory ===
Florey Papers

- Chromosome Diversity in Species, and in Hybrids, of the Tribe Zephyrantheae. The Nucleus, (1968)
- Chromosome Diversity and Variation in Species, and in Hybrids, of the Tribe Zephyrantheae. Abstract, (1968.)
- Chromosomes of Interspecific and Intergeneric Hybrids in Zephyrantheae. Abstract, (1968.)
- High Chromosome Numbers in Several Zephyrantheae Texa. Plant Life, Vol. 36, (1980)
- New Chromosomes in Hybrids in Tribe Zephyrantheae. Abstract, (1969)
- The Origins of Three Recently Described Taxa in Tribe Zephyrantheae. Abstract, (1964.)
- Parthenogenesis in Zephyrantheae. Herbertia, Vol. 6, (1939.)
