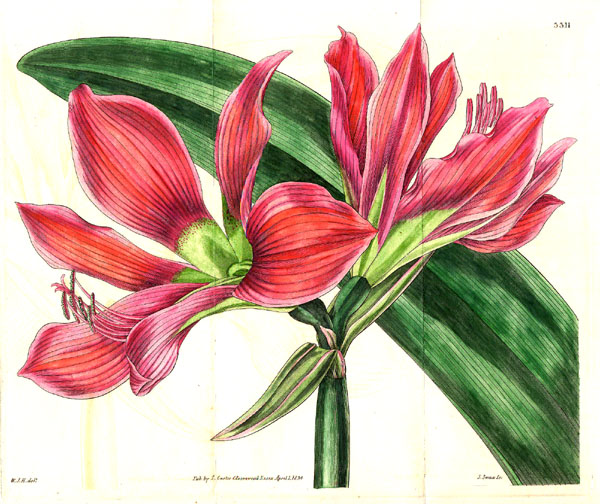
- Hippeastrum aulicum

Scientific classification
- Kingdom: Plantae
- Clade: Tracheophytes
- Clade: Angiosperms
- Clade: Monocots
- Order: Asparagales
- Family: Amaryllidaceae
- Subfamily: Amaryllidoideae
- Tribe: Hippeastreae
- Subtribe: Hippeastrinae; Walp.

Type genus
- Hippeastrum (L.) Herb.

Genera
- See text

Synonyms
- Zephyranthinae Baker; Sprekelieae Nakai, Chosakuronbun Mokuroku; Habranthinae Traub; Tocantinieae Ravenna

= Hippeastrinae =

Subtribe of flowering plants

Hippeastrinae is a subtribe of plants classified under the tribe Hippeastreae. It belongs to the subfamily Amaryllidoideae of the Amaryllis family (Amaryllidaceae).

== Description ==
Terrestrial bulbous perennial herbaceous plants, although three species of Hippeastrum are epiphytic. The leaf shape is linear, lorate, or lanceolate (Eithea has oblanceolate-petioled leaves). The leaf growth pattern is annual or persistent, and often histeranthous. Their texture is firm, and they are moderately canaliculated internally. The scape is hollow and the spathe has two bracts which may be fused or free.

The inflorescence may have between one and thirteen flowers. The flowers, which may be sessile or pedicellate have a perigone that is actinomorphic to highly zygomorphic, and is tubular, campanulate or infundibulorm in shape. The tepal-tube may vary from obsolete to being more than half the length of the perigone. When a paraperigone is present it consists of basal appendages that are diminutive, membranous, bristle-like, and forming a fimbriate-lacerate or callose ring, partly adnate to the throat of the perigone, surrounding the fascicle of the stamen.

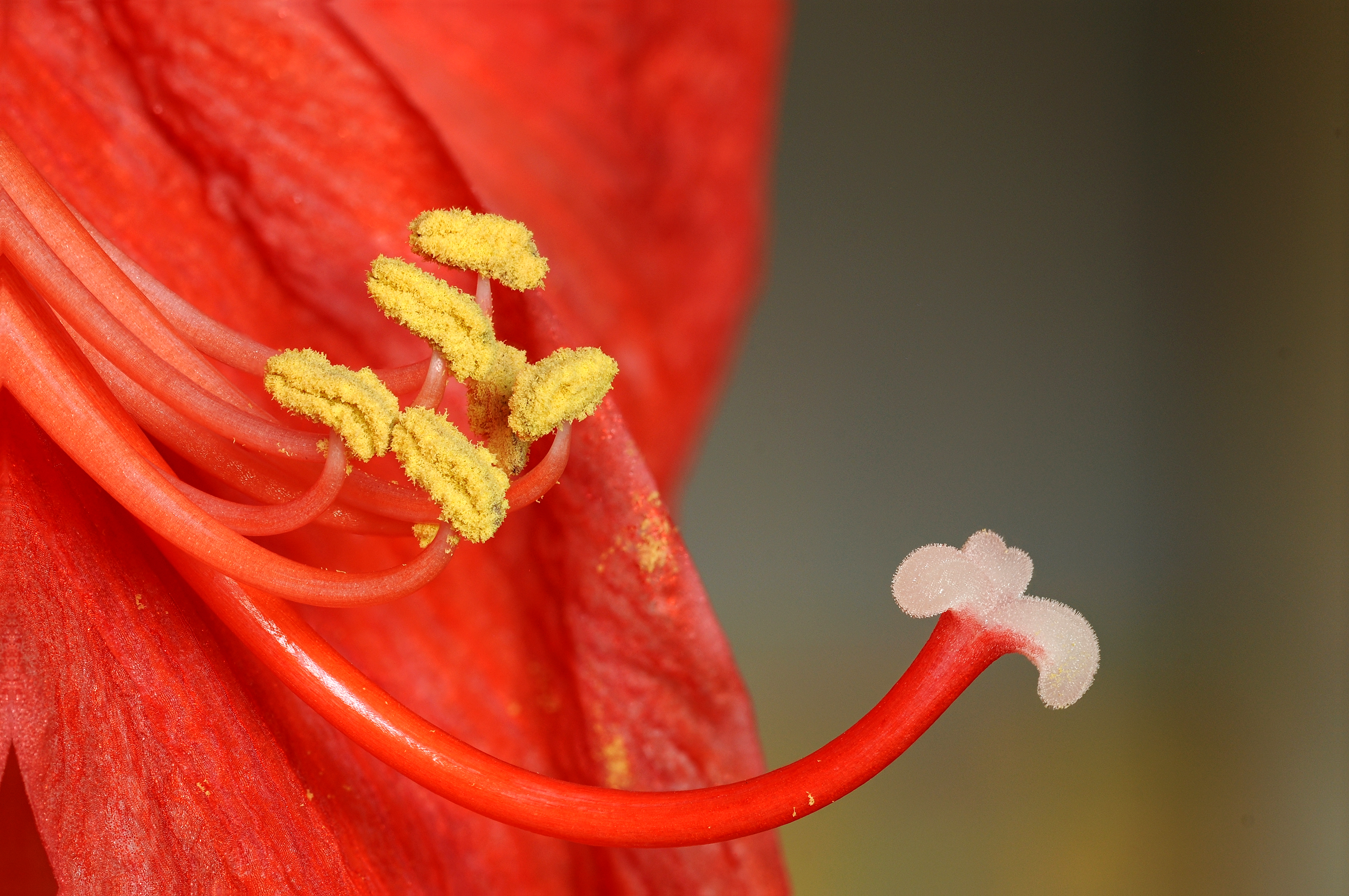
Hippeastrum flower with trifid stigma

The stamen filaments are filiform and either declinate-ascending or straight and arranged in two to four series (2- or 4-seriate). The stigma is usually either trifid or obscurely trilobed, but some taxa (Famatina herbertiana, and certain Hippeastrum species) have a capitate stigma. The style is either declinate or straight. Chromosome number: 2n = 12–60.

== Taxonomy ==
As formulated on morphological grounds alone it included six genera: This included species of medium height and often with many flowers in each inflorescence and inflorescence bracts are different in size and fused basally. The alternative spelling Hippeastrineae was also used by some authors.

As reformulated using molecular phylogenetics it included seven to eight genera (Famatina is uncertain). In this redistribution the four species of Famatina were polyphyletic and F. maulensis segregated with Phycella and was consequently placed in Traubiinae, while the remaining three segregated with Rhodophiala and are considered here. However, none of the identified genera were monophyletic. Some subclades were supported, such as the core-Rhodophiala (Rhodophiala excluding R. bifida but including some Famatina).

Historical distribution of genera: The genera and (number of species) were as follows:

- Eithea (1) (now included in Zephyranthes)
- Famatina s.s. (extiguished)
- Habranthus (86) (now included in Zephyranthes)
- Hippeastrum
- Rhodophiala (27) (now included in Zephyranthes)
- Sprekelia (2) (now included in Zephyranthes)
- Tocantinia (1) (now included in Hippeastrum subgenus Tocantinia)
- Zephyranthes (107)

Formerly included, now subtribe Traubiinae:

- Placea
- Phycella (includes Famatina maulensis)
- Traubia

Following a decision to include Tocantinia within Hippeastrum as a subgenus, a major recircumscription of the Hippeastrae was undertaken in 2019, resulting in recognition of only two genera in Hippeastrinae, most of the remainder being submerged into various subgenera of Zephyranthes;

- Hippeastrum Herb. 2 subgenera:
  - Tocantinia (Ravenna) Nic.García (3)
  - Hippeastrum (~100)
- Zephyranthes Herb. 5 subgenera:
  - Eithea (Ravenna) Nic.García (2)
  - Zephyranthes (~150)
  - Habranthus (Herb.) Nic.García (3)
  - Neorhodophiala Nic.García & Meerow (1)
  - Myostemma (Salisb.) Nic.García (17)

== Distribution ==
Mainly subtropical and tropical regions of South America, the Greater Antilles, Mexico, and the southern United States. Core-Rhodophiala species are distributed in Mediterranean Chile, including the lowlands and high-Andes as well as high Andean areas of Argentina, and also the Atacama Desert.

== Bibliography ==
- Christenhusz, M.M.; Fay, M.; Byng, J.W. (2018). The global flora: Special edition: GLOVAP nomenclature part 1 (Vol. 4). Plant Gateway Ltd.
- Walpers, Wilhelm Gerhard (1848–1868). Annales botanices systematicae (7 vols.) (in Latin). Leipzig.
- García, Nicolás; Meerow, Alan W.; Soltis, Douglas E.; Soltis, Pamela S. (1 March 2014). "Testing Deep Reticulate Evolution in Amaryllidaceae Tribe Hippeastreae (Asparagales) with ITS and Chloroplast Sequence Data". Systematic Botany. 39 (1): 75–89. doi:10.1600/036364414X678099. S2CID 86117335.
- —; Meerow, Alan W.; Arroyo-Leuenberger, Silvia; Oliveira, Renata S.; Dutilh, Julie H.; Soltis, Pamela S.; Judd, Walter S. (June 2019). "Generic classification of Amaryllidaceae tribe Hippeastreae". Taxon. 68 (3): 481–498. doi:10.1002/tax.12062. S2CID 202854432.(With corrections published 2020)
- Meerow, A.W.; Fay, M.F.; Guy, C.L.; Li, Q.-B.; Zaman, F.Q.; Chase, M.W. (1999). "Systematics of Amaryllidaceae based on cladistic analysis of plastid rbcL and trnL-F sequence data". Am. J. Bot. 86 (9): 1325–1345. doi:10.2307/2656780. JSTOR 2656780. PMID 10487820.
- Meerow, A.W.; Guy, C.L.; Li, Q.-B.; Yang, S.-L. (2000). "Phylogeny of the American Amaryllidaceae Based on nrDNA ITS Sequences" (PDF). Systematic Botany. 25 (4): 708–726. doi:10.2307/2666729. JSTOR 2666729. S2CID 20392462. Archived from the original (PDF) on 23 September 2015.
- Vigneron, Pascal (2008). "Amaryllidaceae". Amaryllidaceae.org (in French). Archived from the original on 4 January 2015.
- "Amaryllidaceae: A taxonomic tool for the Amaryllidaceae of the world". eMonocot. Archived from the original on 2016-03-04.
