= Hippeastrum mirum =

Scientific classification
- Kingdom: Plantae
- Clade: Tracheophytes
- Clade: Angiosperms
- Clade: Monocots
- Order: Asparagales
- Family: Amaryllidaceae
- Subfamily: Amaryllidoideae
- Subtribe: Hippeastrinae
- Genus: Hippeastrum
- Subgenus: Hippeastrum subg. Tocantinia
- Species: H. mirum

Binomial name
- Hippeastrum mirum (Ravenna) Christenh. & Byng

Synonyms
- Tocantinia mira Ravenna

Species of bulb

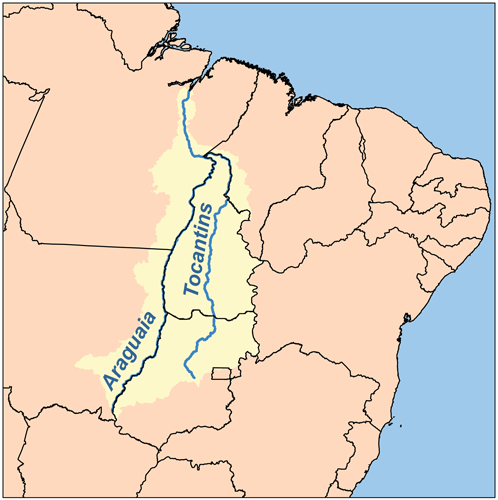
Watershed of Araguaia and Tocantins river systems (yellow), through Tocantins State (outlined), Brazil

Hippeastrum mirum is a species of herbaceous perennial bulbous flowering plants in the amaryllis family, Amaryllidaceae, subfamily Amaryllidoideae. It was formerly treated as Tocantinia mira.

== Description ==
The flowers are single, the stigma capitate. Spathe bracts are lanceolate, with a single valve.

== Distribution and habitat ==
Tocantinia mira grows in a dry forest of Brazil between the rivers Araguaia and Tocantins.

== Bibliography ==
- "The Plant List: a working list of all known plant species. Version: 1.1". Royal Botanic Gardens, Kew and Missouri Botanical Garden. September 2013.
- "World Checklist of Selected Plant Families". Royal Botanic Gardens, Kew.
- García, Nicolás; Meerow, Alan W.; Soltis, Douglas E.; Soltis, Pamela S. (1 March 2014). "Testing Deep Reticulate Evolution in Amaryllidaceae Tribe Hippeastreae (Asparagales) with ITS and Chloroplast Sequence Data". Systematic Botany. 39 (1): 75–89. doi:10.1600/036364414X678099. S2CID 86117335.
- Ravenna, P. F. (2000). "Tocantinia and Cearanthes, two new genera, and Tocantinieae new tribe, of Brazilian Amarylidaceae". Onira. 5 (3): 9–43.
- Byng, James W. (2014). The Flowering Plants Handbook: A Practical Guide to Families and Genera of the World. Plant Gateway Ltd. ISBN 978-0992999308.
- "Pacific Bulb Society". Pacific Bulb Society. 2012.
