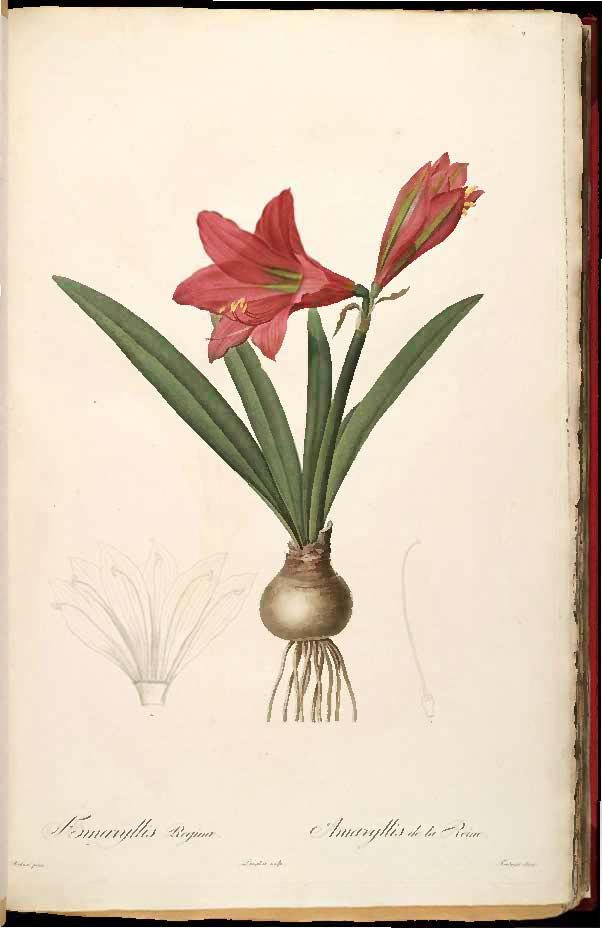
- Amaryllis reginae

Scientific classification
- Kingdom: Plantae
- Clade: Tracheophytes
- Clade: Angiosperms
- Clade: Monocots
- Order: Asparagales
- Family: Amaryllidaceae
- Subfamily: Amaryllidoideae
- Subtribe: Hippeastrinae
- Genus: Hippeastrum
- Subgenus: Hippeastrum subg. Hippeastrum
- Species: H. reginae

Binomial name
- Hippeastrum reginae (L.) Herb.

Synonyms
- Amaryllis reginae L.; Aschamia reginae (L.) Salisb.

= Hippeastrum reginae =

Mexican Lily

Species of flowering plant

Hippeastrum reginae, the mexican lily, is a flowering perennial herbaceous bulbous plant, in the family Amaryllidaceae, native to Venezuela, Bolivia, Peru and Brazil.

== Description ==
H. reginae grows to 60 cm in height, and has flowers of 12 cm in size.

== Taxonomy ==
Described by Carl Linnaeus in 1759, as Amaryllis reginae, it was the type species for the genus. It was transferred to Hippeastrum by William Herbert.

== Sources ==
- The Plant List (2012). "Hippeastrum reginae".
- GBIF: Hippeastrum reginae
- Pacific Bulb Society: Hippeastrum reginae
- "Hippeastrum reginae". Tropicos. Missouri Botanical Garden.
- International Bulb Society: Hippeastrum reginae (image)
