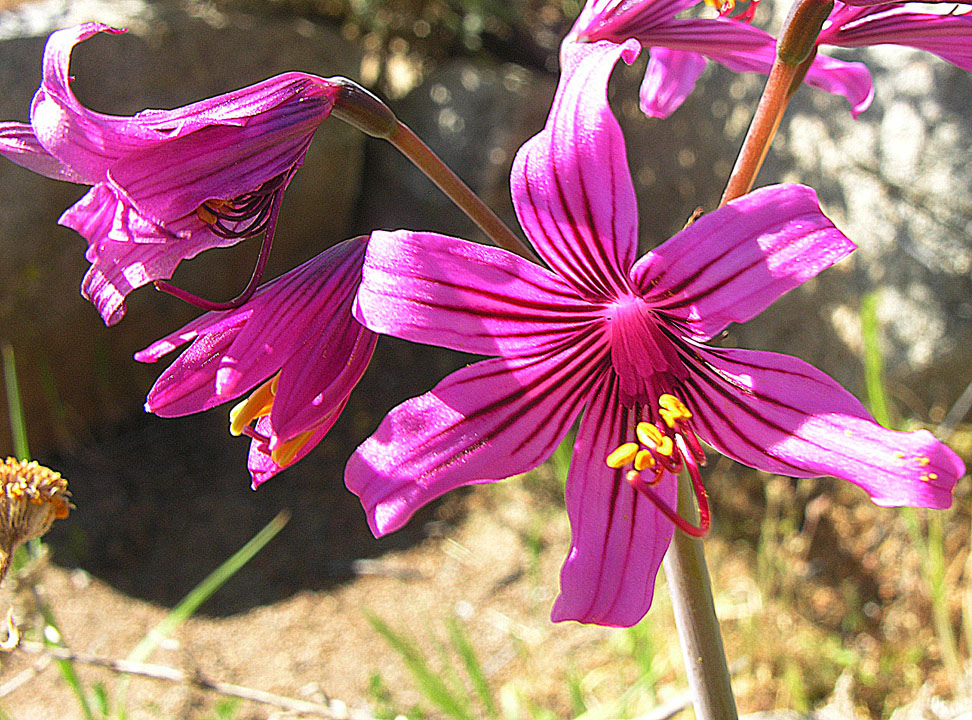
- Phycella amoena

Scientific classification
- Kingdom: Plantae
- Clade: Tracheophytes
- Clade: Angiosperms
- Clade: Monocots
- Order: Asparagales
- Family: Amaryllidaceae
- Subfamily: Amaryllidoideae
- Tribe: Hippeastreae
- Subtribe: Traubiinae; D.Müll.-Doblies & U.Müll.-Doblies

Type genus
- Traubia Moldenke

Genera
- See text

Synonyms
- Traubieae

= Traubiinae =

Subtribe of flowering plants

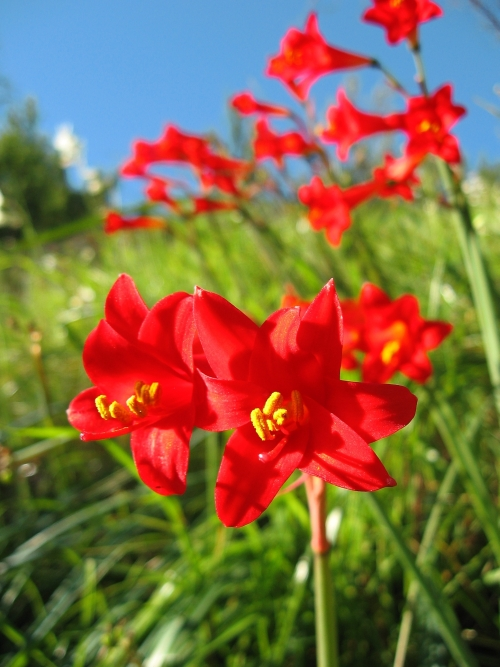
Phycella cyrtanthoides

Traubiinae is a subtribe of plants classified under the tribe Hippeastreae. It belongs to the subfamily Amaryllidoideae of the Amaryllis family (Amaryllidaceae).

== Description ==
Bulbous perennial herbaceous plants, terrestrial in habitat. Leaves linear or lorate, annual, sometimes hysteranthous.

== Taxonomy ==
The term was originally used by the Müller-Doblies' in 1996 as a monotypic subtribe of Hippeastreae, to include Traubia, based on Traub's original use of Traubeae for the same purpose.

Created from a redistribution of genera of Hippeastreae following a molecular phylogenetic study it is composed of the following genera, based on the presence of lorate-leaves rather than petiolate, which form the remaining genera of the tribe Hippeastreae, i.e. Hippeastrinae. In this redistribution the four species of Famatina were polyphyletic and F. maulensis segregated with Phycella and was consequently transferred:

The generic distribution here is based on Garcia et al 2019.

- [Placea previous genus]
- Phycella (~13 species)
- Rhodolirium (2 species)
- Traubia (monotypic for T. modesta)
- Paposoa (monotypic for P. laeta)

The tribe Hippeastreae underwent a major recircumscription in 2019 and 2020. As a result a new genus, Eremolirion Nic.García (for Rhodolirium laetum and monotypic as Eremolirion laetum), leaving a more restricted Rhodolirium s. str.. In addition, Placea was absorbed into Phycella. The genus name Eremolirion was subsequently changed to Paposoa to avoid confusion with Eremiolirion.

== Bibliography ==
- García Berguecio, Nicolás (2015). Systematics and evolution of Amaryllidaceae tribe Hippeastreae (Asparagales) (PhD Thesis). University of Florida.
- Traub, H.P. (1963). Genera of the Amaryllidaceae. La Jolla, California: American Plant Life Society.
- García, Nicolás; Meerow, Alan W.; Soltis, Douglas E.; Soltis, Pamela S. (1 March 2014). "Testing Deep Reticulate Evolution in Amaryllidaceae Tribe Hippeastreae (Asparagales) with ITS and Chloroplast Sequence Data". Systematic Botany. 39 (1): 75–89. doi:10.1600/036364414X678099. S2CID 86117335.
- —; Meerow, Alan W.; Arroyo-Leuenberger, Silvia; Oliveira, Renata S.; Dutilh, Julie H.; Soltis, Pamela S.; Judd, Walter S. (June 2019). "Generic classification of Amaryllidaceae tribe Hippeastreae". Taxon. 68 (3): 481–498. doi:10.1002/tax.12062. S2CID 202854432.(With corrections published 2020)
- Meerow, A.W.; Fay, M.F.; Guy, C.L.; Li, Q.-B.; Zaman, F.Q.; Chase, M.W. (1999). "Systematics of Amaryllidaceae based on cladistic analysis of plastid rbcL and trnL-F sequence data". Am. J. Bot. 86 (9): 1325–1345. doi:10.2307/2656780. JSTOR 2656780. PMID 10487820.
- Meerow, A.W.; Guy, C.L.; Li, Q.-B.; Yang, S.-L. (2000). "Phylogeny of the American Amaryllidaceae Based on nrDNA ITS Sequences" (PDF). Systematic Botany. 25 (4): 708–726. doi:10.2307/2666729. JSTOR 2666729. S2CID 20392462.
- Müller-Doblies, U.; Müller-Doblies, D. (1996). "Tribes and subtribes and some species combinations in Amaryllidaceae J St Hil R Dahlgren & al. 1985". Feddes Repertorium. 107 (5–6): S.c.1–S.c.9.
- Urbina-Casanova, Rafael; Saldivia, Patricio; Scherson, Rosa A. (December 2015). "Consideraciones sobre la sistemática de las familias y los géneros de plantas vasculares endémicos de Chile". Gayana. Botánica (in Spanish). 72 (2): 272–295. doi:10.4067/S0717-66432015000200011.
- Vigneron, Pascal (2008). "Amaryllidaceae". Amaryllidaceae.org (in French). Archived from the original on 4 January 2015.
