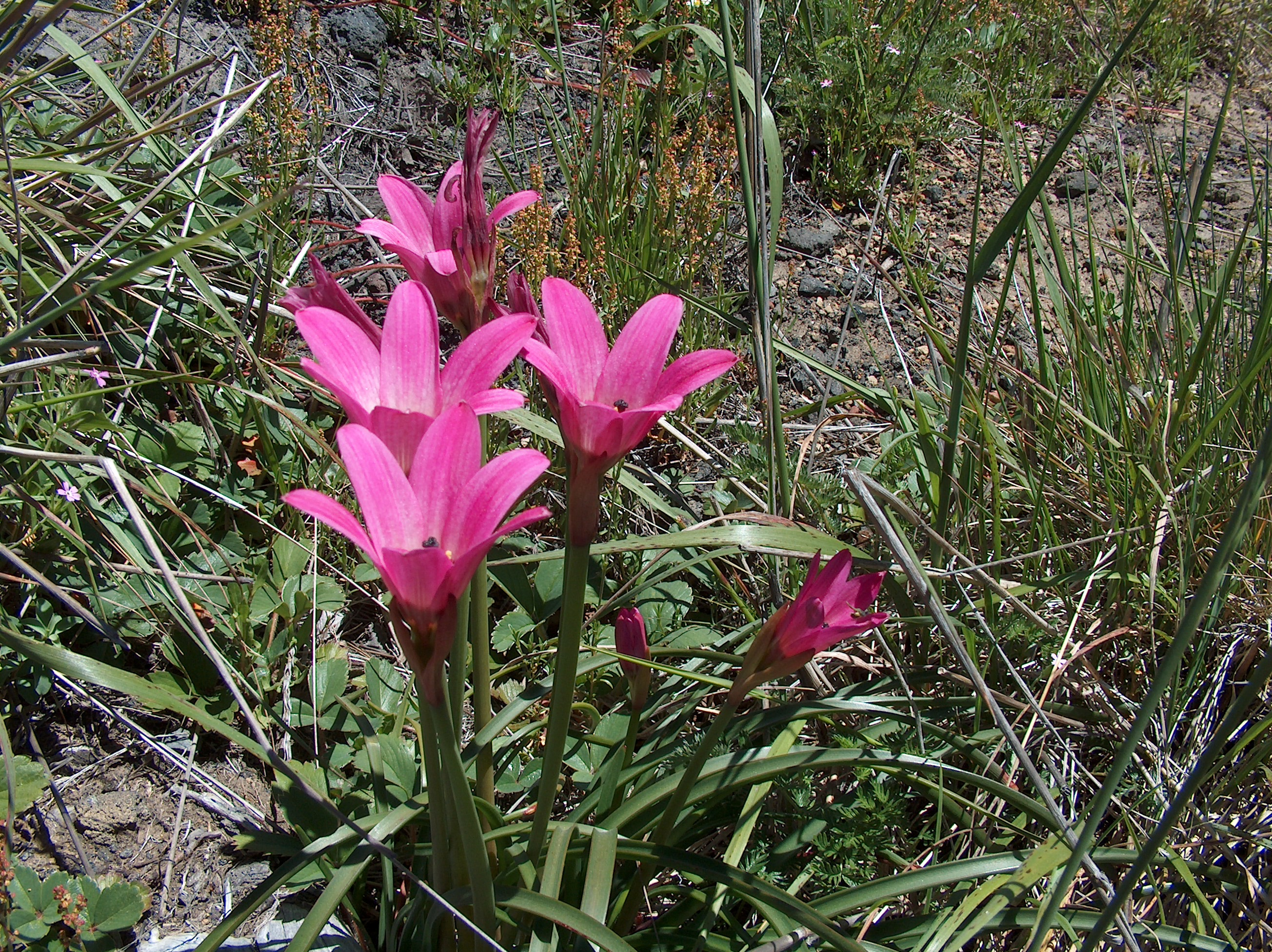

Scientific classification
- Kingdom: Plantae
- Clade: Tracheophytes
- Clade: Angiosperms
- Clade: Monocots
- Order: Asparagales
- Family: Amaryllidaceae
- Subfamily: Amaryllidoideae
- Genus: Rhodolirium
- Species: R. andicola

Binomial name
- Rhodolirium andicola (Poepp.) Ravenna

= Rhodolirium andicola =

Species of plant

Rhodolirium andicola is a species of flowering plant in the family Amaryllidaceae. It is a perennial herb native to Chile and Argentina. In Chile, it is distributed between the Maule and Los Lagos regions.
