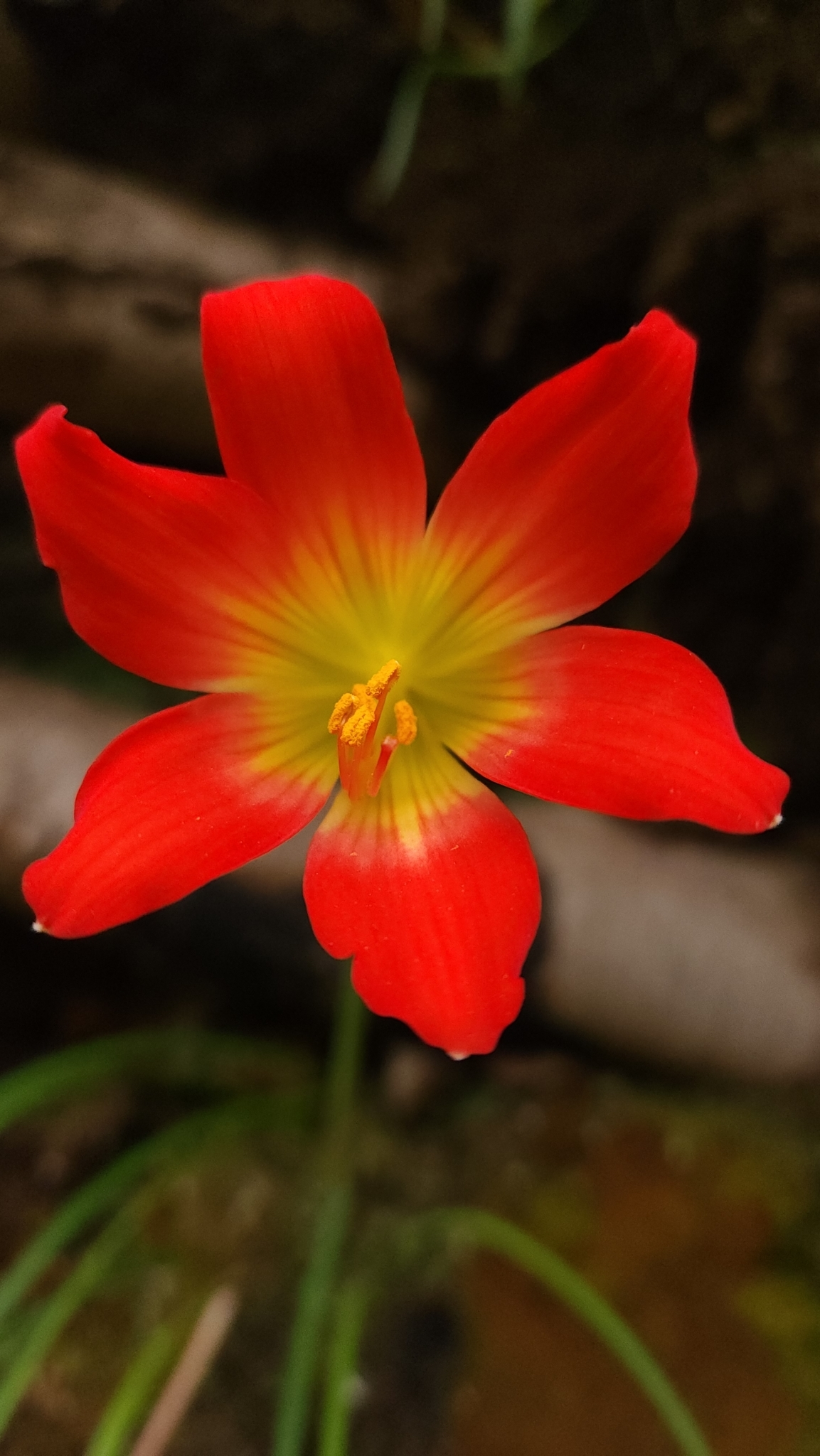

Scientific classification
- Kingdom: Plantae
- Clade: Tracheophytes
- Clade: Angiosperms
- Clade: Monocots
- Order: Asparagales
- Family: Amaryllidaceae
- Subfamily: Amaryllidoideae
- Genus: Phycella
- Species: P. chilensis

Binomial name
- Phycella chilensis (L'Hér.) Grau ex Nic.García

= Phycella chilensis =

Species of plant

Phycella chilensis is a species of flowering plant in the family Amaryllidaceae. It is a bulbous geophyte endemic to central Chile.
