= Famatina (plant) =

Genus of flowering plants

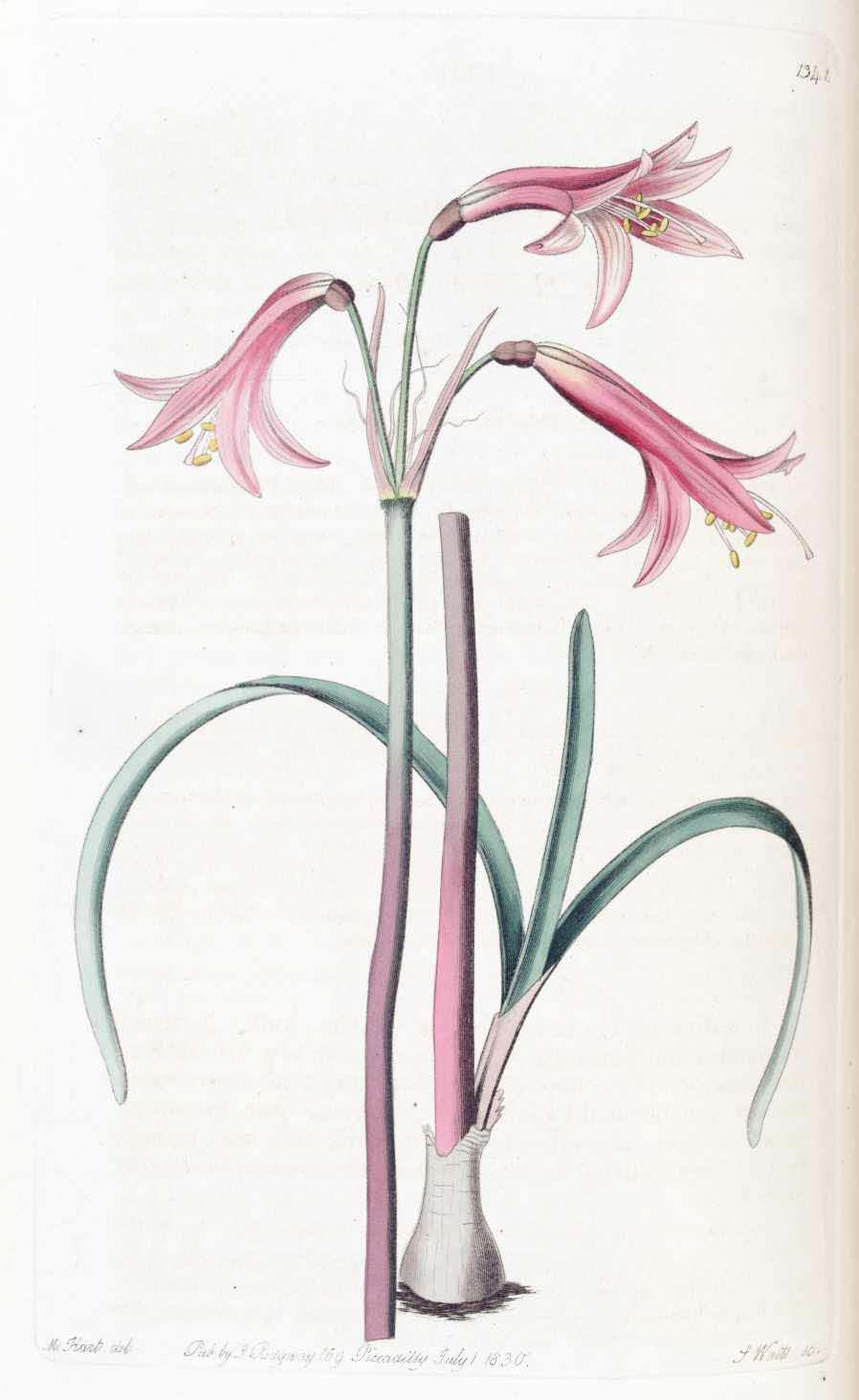
Famatina herbertiana (Zephyranthes graciliflora)

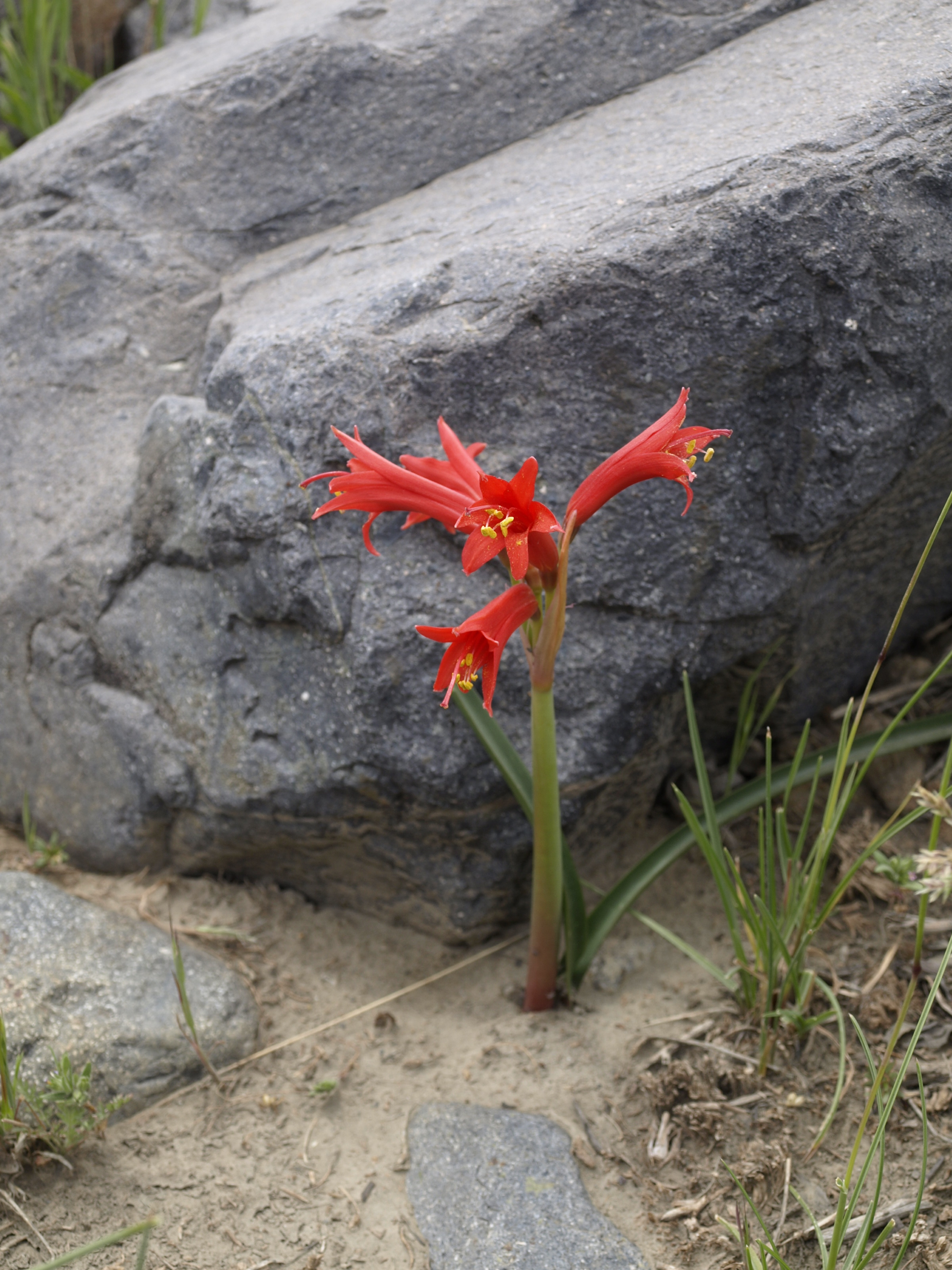
Famatina andina (Zephyranthes tenuiflora)

Famatina was a small genus of South American bulbous plants identified by the Chilean botanist Ravenna in 1972. Five species have been described. Molecular phylogenetic studies suggested the genus was polyphyletic, and species have been moved to other genera.

== Taxonomy ==
Molecular phylogenetic studies suggested the genus was polyphyletic. Of four species examined, one (F. maulensis) segregated in a clade together with members of the Traubiinae subtribe, while the remaining three (F. andina, F. cisandina, and F. herbertiana) segregated with members of subtribe Hippeastrinae. The first species is now placed in the genus Phycella, the others in the genus Zephyranthes.

=== Subdivision ===
Described species:

- Famatina andina (Phil.) Ravenna – synonym of Zephyranthes tenuiflora
- Famatina cisandina Ravenna – syn. of Zephyranthes cisandina
- Famatina herbertiana (Lindl.) Ravenna – syn. of Zephyranthes graciliflora
- Famatina maulensis Ravenna – syn. of Phycella maulensis
- Famatina saxatilis Ravenna – syn. of Zephyranthes graciliflora

== Distribution and habitat ==
Chile and Argentinean Andes in Mediterranean zones. Moreira-Muñoz considers 2 of the five species endemic to Chile.

== Bibliography ==
- Moreira-Muñoz, Andrés (2011). Plant geography of Chile. Dordrecht: Springer. ISBN 9789048187485.
- García, Nicolás; Meerow, Alan W.; Soltis, Douglas E.; Soltis, Pamela S. (1 March 2014). "Testing Deep Reticulate Evolution in Amaryllidaceae Tribe Hippeastreae (Asparagales) with ITS and Chloroplast Sequence Data". Systematic Botany. 39 (1): 75–89. doi:10.1600/036364414X678099. S2CID 86117335.
- Ravenna, P (1972). "Famatina gen. nov., Amaryllidaceae". Plant Life. 28: 55–62.
- Ravenna, P (1981). "Contributions to South American Amaryllidaceae VII". Plant Life. 37: 57–83.
- Ravenna, P. (2003a). "Elucidation and systematics of the Chilean genera of Amaryllidaceae". Botanica Australis. 2: 1–20.
- Urbina-Casanova, Rafael; Saldivia, Patricio; Scherson, Rosa A. (December 2015). "Consideraciones sobre la sistemática de las familias y los géneros de plantas vasculares endémicos de Chile". Gayana. Botánica (in Spanish). 72 (2): 272–295. doi:10.4067/S0717-66432015000200011.
- "Search for 'Famatina'". World Checklist of Selected Plant Families. Royal Botanic Gardens, Kew.
- "Tropicos". Missouri Botanical Garden. 2015.
