= Hippeastrum subg. Hippeastrum =

- Flowering Hippeastrum striatum

Scientific classification
- Kingdom: Plantae
- Clade: Tracheophytes
- Clade: Angiosperms
- Clade: Monocots
- Order: Asparagales
- Family: Amaryllidaceae
- Subfamily: Amaryllidoideae
- Genus: Hippeastrum
- Subgenus: Hippeastrum subg. Hippeastrum (autonym)

Type species
- Hippeastrum reginae (L.) Herb.

Species
- See here

Subgenus of flowering plants

Hippeastrum subg. Hippeastrum is a subgenus of the genus Hippeastrum native to South America.

== Description ==
=== Vegetative characteristics ===
Hippeastrum subg. Hippeastrum are bulbous, (15–)30–100 cm tall plants with globose bulbs bearing usually annual leaves.

=== Generative characteristics ===
The scapose, (1–)2–4(–8)-flowered inflorescence with a 2–30 cm long, and 1–6 mm wide scape bears pedicellate, zygomorphic flowers.

=== Cytology ===
Various chromosome counts have been observed: 2n = 22, 33, 44, 55, 66, 77.

== Taxonomy ==
It is an autonym.

=== Species ===
It has about 100 species:

- Hippeastrum lavrense (Ravenna) R.S.Oliveira & Dutilh
- Hippeastrum reginae (L.) Herb.
- Hippeastrum stapfianum (Kraenzl.) R.S.Oliveira & Dutilh

== Distribution and habitat ==
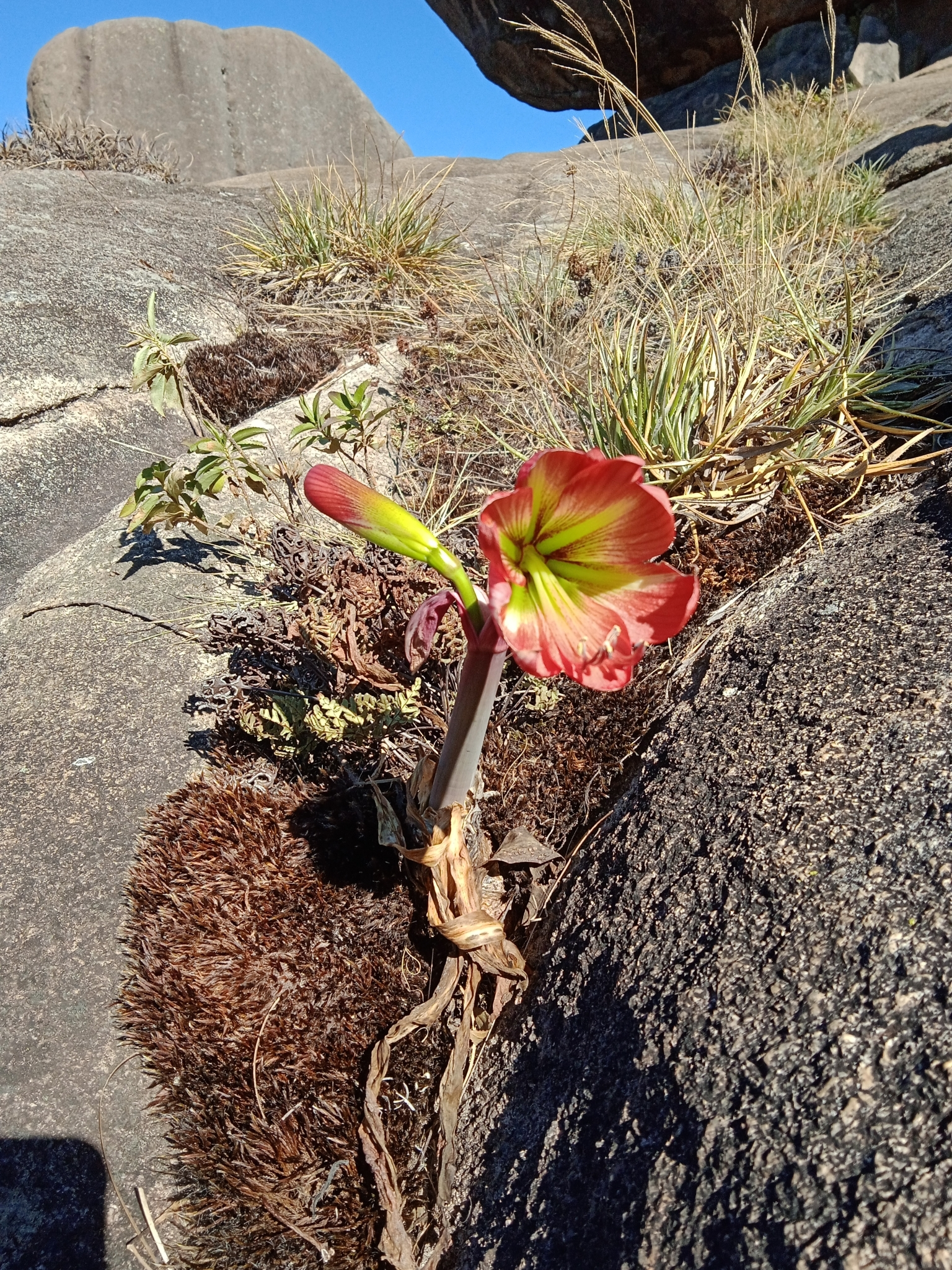
Hippeastrum morelianum in its natural habitat in Brazil

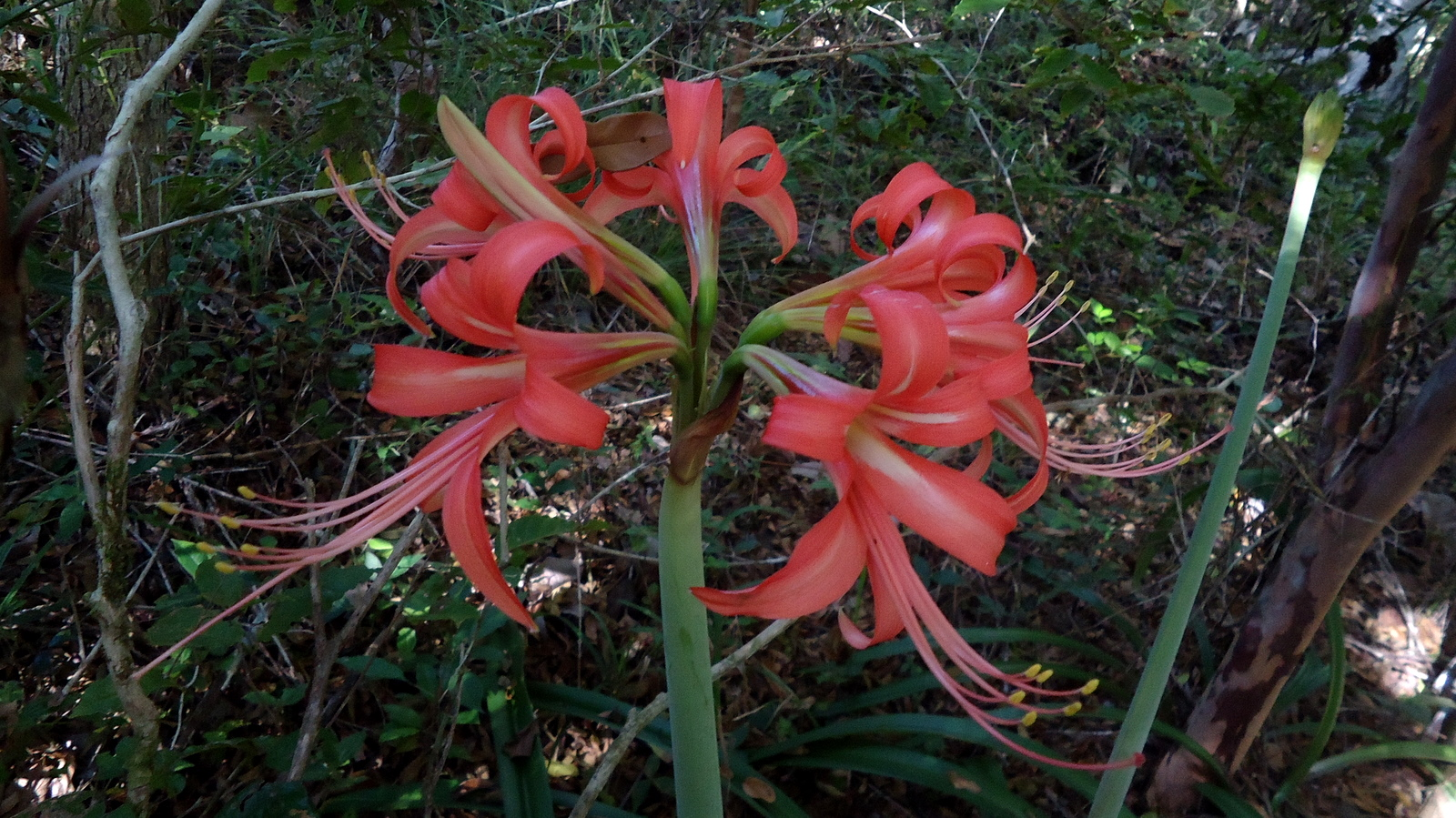
Hippeastrum stylosum in Bahia, Brazil

Species of Hippeastrum subg. Hippeastrum occur in South America in the region spanning from central Argentina to Colombia. The centre of diversity is eastern Brazil, as well as the Peruvian and Bolivian Andes.
