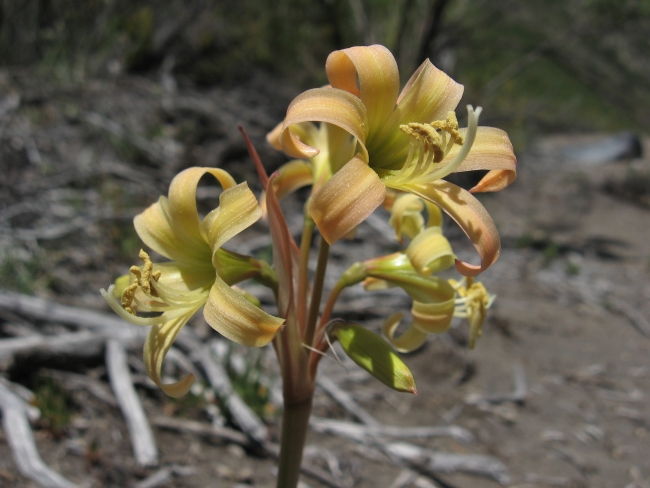
- Rhodophiala montana

Scientific classification
- Kingdom: Plantae
- Clade: Tracheophytes
- Clade: Angiosperms
- Clade: Monocots
- Order: Asparagales
- Family: Amaryllidaceae
- Subfamily: Amaryllidoideae
- Subtribe: Hippeastrinae
- Genus: Rhodophiala; C.Presl.

Type species
- Rhodophiala amarylloides C.Presl

Species
- See text

= Rhodophiala =

Former genus of flowering plants

Rhodophiala was a genus of herbaceous, perennial and bulbous plants in the Amaryllis family (Amaryllidaceae, subfamily Amaryllidoideae). It consisted of about 30 South American species distributed in southern Brazil, Argentina, and, specially, in Chile. Most of the species are known colloquially as añañuca. It has now been submerged in Zephyranthes.

== Description ==
Rhodophiala species resemble small-flowered Hippeastrum or multiflowered Habranthus species. Their narrow parallel-sided leaves are unlike that of Hippeastrum, more closely resembling that of Habranthus or Zephyranthes.

== Taxonomy ==
=== Taxonomic history ===
At one stage, Rhodophiala was considered a subgenus of the closely related Hippeastrum.

Although as of February 2016 not yet accepted by the World Checklist of Selected Plant Families a number of species of Rhodophiala have been rehabilitated as Rhodolirium.

=== Former species ===
This genus does not have any accepted species, since it is a synonym of Phycella Lindl. Former species include:

- Rhodophiala advena (Ker Gawl.) Traub – Central Chile
- Rhodophiala ananuca (Phil.) Traub – Northern Chile
- Rhodophiala andina Phil. – Central Chile
- Rhodophiala araucana (Phil.) Traub – distributed Chile to Southern Argentina
- Rhodophiala bagnoldii (Herb.) Traub – Northern and Central Chile
- Rhodophiala bakeri (Phil.) Traub – Central Chile
- Rhodophiala berteroana (Phil.) Traub – Central Chile
- Rhodophiala bifida (Herb.) Traub – distributed Southern Brazil to Argentina (Buenos Aires)
- Rhodophiala biflora Phil. – Chile
- Rhodophiala colonum (Phil.) Traub – Southern Chile
- Rhodophiala consobrina (Phil.) Traub – Central Chile
- Rhodophiala flava (Phil.) Traub – Southern Chile
- Rhodophiala fulgens (Hook.f.) Traub – Central Chile
- Rhodophiala gilliesiana (Herb.) ined. – distributed Chile to Southern Argentina
- Rhodophiala lineata (Phil.) Traub – Chile
- Rhodophiala maculata (L'Hér.) Ravenna – Chile
- Rhodophiala moelleri (Phil.) Traub – Southern Chile
- Rhodophiala montana (Phil.) Traub – Chile
- Rhodophiala phycelloides (Herb.) Hunz. – Chile
- Rhodophiala popetana (Phil.) Traub – Central Chile
- Rhodophiala rosea (Sweet) Traub – Chile
- Rhodophiala splendens (Renjifo) Traub – Central Chile
- Rhodophiala tiltilensis (Traub & Moldenke) Traub – Central Chile
- Rhodophiala andicola (Poepp.) Traub
- Rhodophiala chilensis (L'Hér.) Traub
- Rhodophiala pratensis (Poepp.) Traub
- Rhodophiala rhodolirion (Baker) Traub

== Bibliography ==
- García, Nicolás; Meerow, Alan W.; Soltis, Douglas E.; Soltis, Pamela S. (1 March 2014). "Testing Deep Reticulate Evolution in Amaryllidaceae Tribe Hippeastreae (Asparagales) with ITS and Chloroplast Sequence Data". Systematic Botany. 39 (1): 75–89. doi:10.1600/036364414X678099. S2CID 86117335.
- —; Meerow, Alan W.; Arroyo-Leuenberger, Silvia; Oliveira, Renata S.; Dutilh, Julie H.; Soltis, Pamela S.; Judd, Walter S. (June 2019). "Generic classification of Amaryllidaceae tribe Hippeastreae". Taxon. 68 (3): 481–498. doi:10.1002/tax.12062. S2CID 202854432.(With corrections published 2020)
- Muñoz, Manuel; Riegel, Ricardo; Seemann, Peter; Peñailillo, Patricio; Schiappacasse, Flavia; Núñez, José (2011). "Relaciones filogenéticas de Rhodolirium montanum Phil. y especies afines, basadas en secuencias nucleotídicas de la región ITS y análisis cariotípico". Gayana. Botánica. 68 (1): 40–48. doi:10.4067/S0717-66432011000100005.
- Letelier, Patricia; Cabello, Ángel (December 2013). "Descripción de bulbos y hojas de Rhodophiala tiltilensis (Traub & Moldenke) Traub, y propagación vegetativa" (PDF). Revista del Jardín Botánico Chagual (in Spanish). 11 (11): 72–78.
