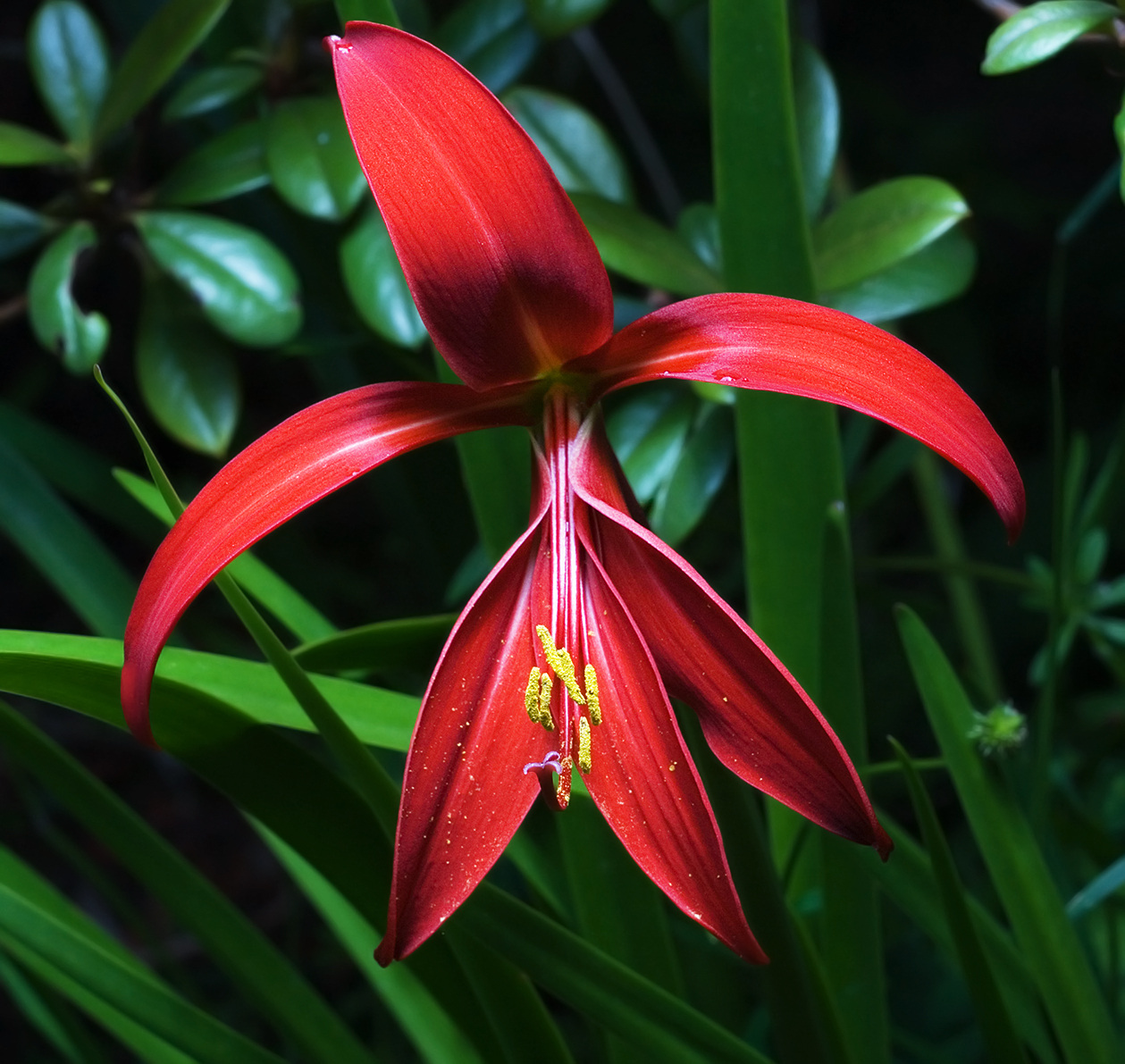

Scientific classification
- Kingdom: Plantae
- Clade: Tracheophytes
- Clade: Angiosperms
- Clade: Monocots
- Order: Asparagales
- Family: Amaryllidaceae
- Subfamily: Amaryllidoideae
- Tribe: Hippeastreae
- Subtribe: Hippeastrinae
- Genus: Zephyranthes
- Species: Z. formosissima

Binomial name
- Zephyranthes formosissima (L.) Z.H.Feng
- It is endemic to Mexico

Synonyms
- List: Amaryllis formosa Salisb., nom. superfl.; Amaryllis formosissima L.; Amaryllis karwinskii Zucc.; Hippeastrum formosissimum (L.) P.J.S.Cramer, nom. illeg.; Hippeastrum glaucum (Lindl.) Christenh. & Byng; Narcissus jacobaea G.Edwards; Sprekelia clintiae Traub; Sprekelia glauca Lindl.; Sprekelia heisteri Trew ex Kunth; Sprekelia karwinskii (Zucc.) M.Roem.; Sprekelia ringens C.Morren; Sprekelia stenopetala Lem.

= Zephyranthes formosissima =

Species of plant

Zephyranthes formosissima (formerly Sprekelia formosissima), also known as Aztec lilies or Jacobean lilies, is a species of bulbous perennial herb in the family Amaryllidaceae endemic to Mexico. After its former genus Sprekelia has been merged into the genus Zephyranthes in 2019, it was formally transferred to Zephyranthes in 2024.

== Description ==
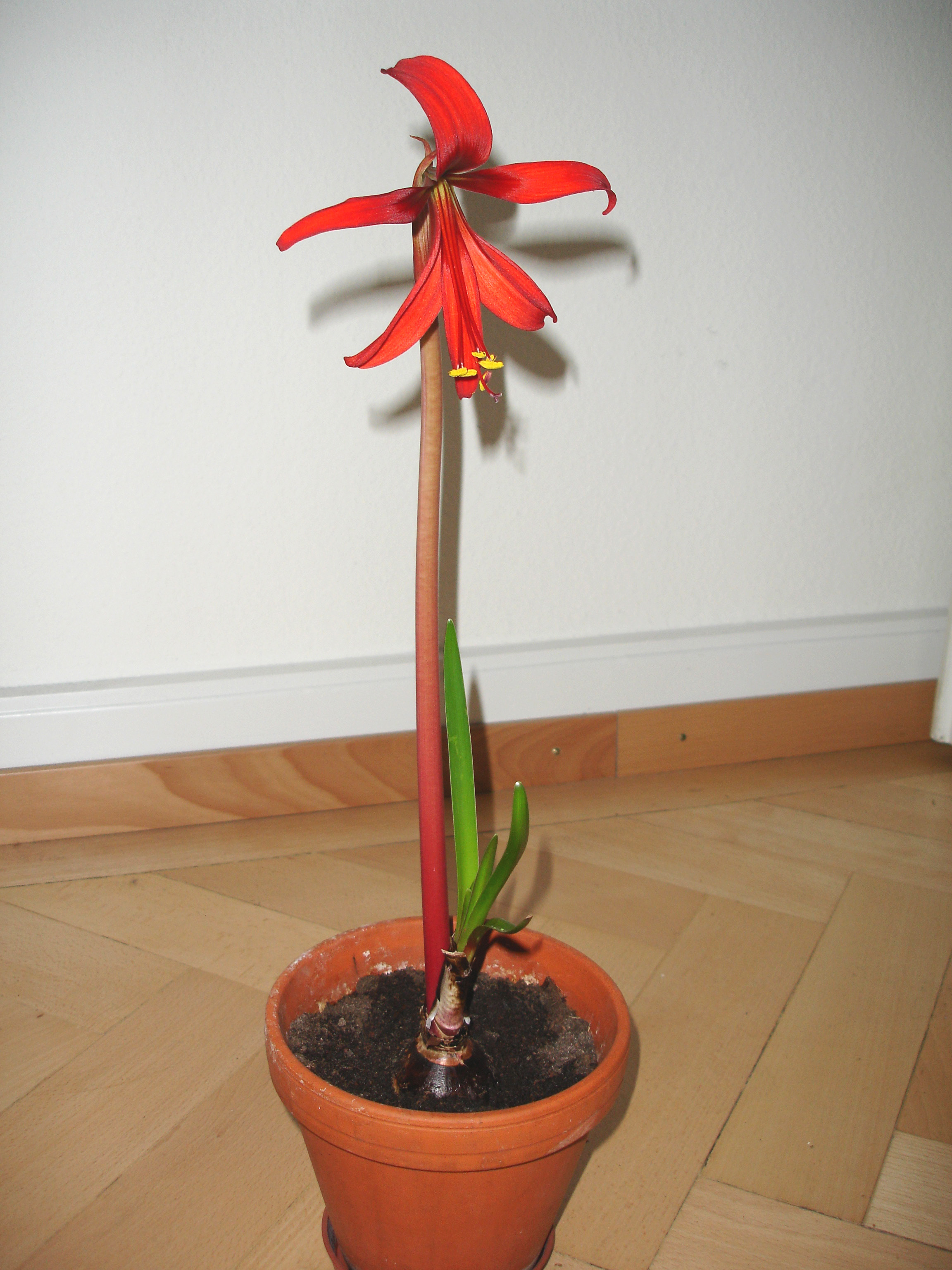
Flowering Zephyranthes formosissima cultivated in a pot

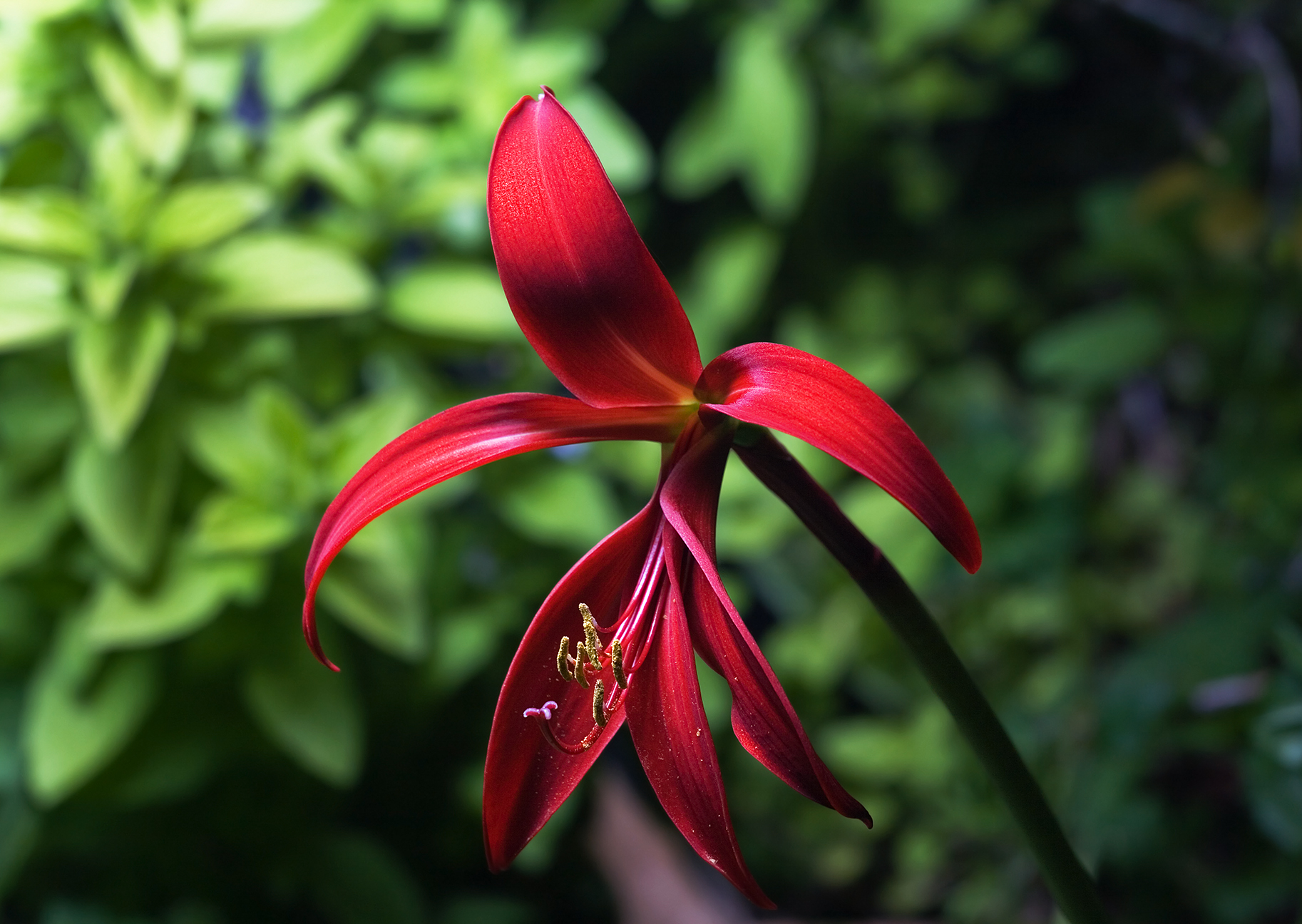
Zephyranthes formosissima flower

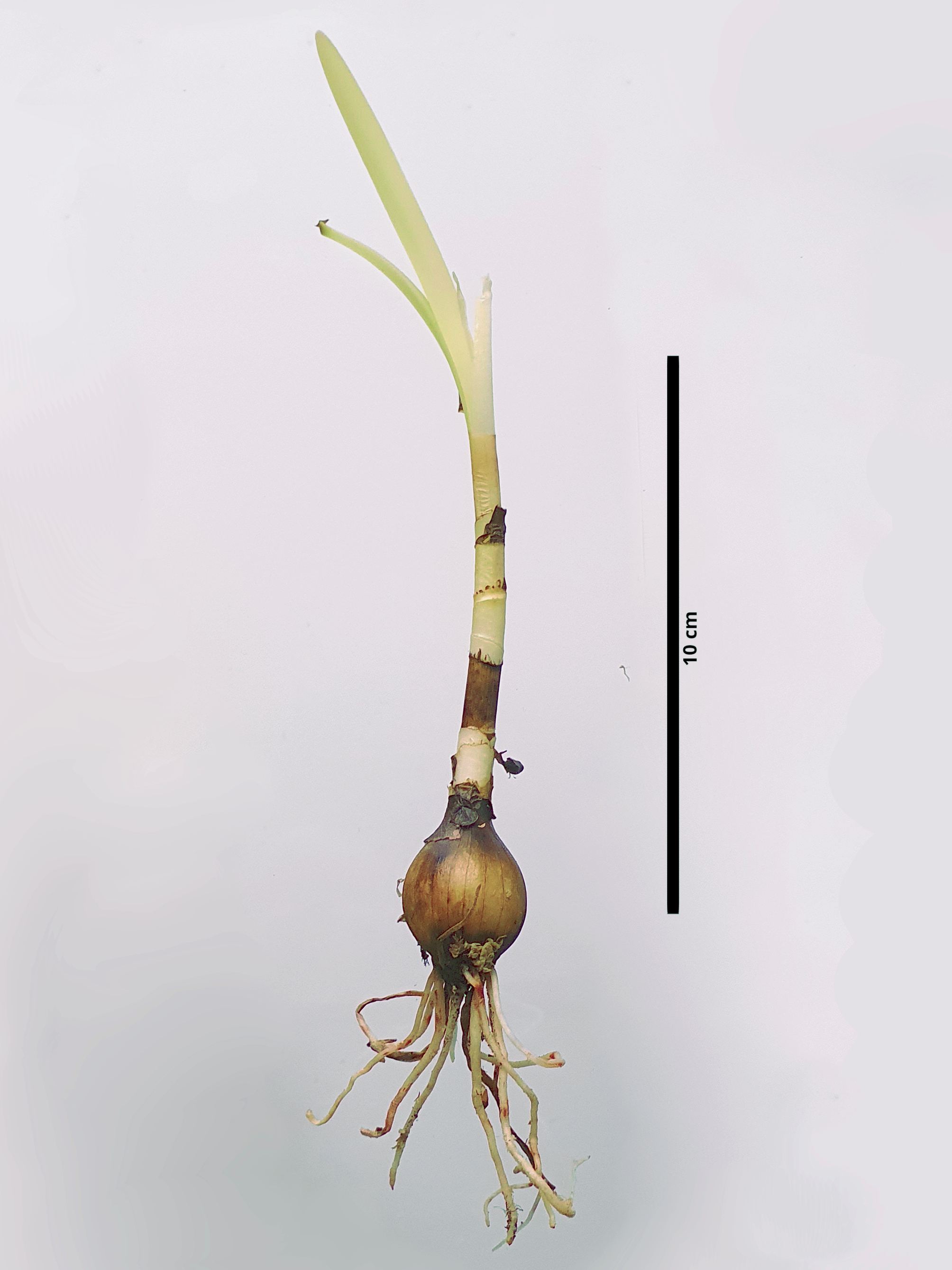
Zephyranthes formosissima bulb with scale bar (10 cm)

=== Vegetative characteristics ===
Zephyranthes formosissima is a bulbous, perennial herb with ovate to globose, up to 5 cm wide, long-necked bulbs, bearing 3–6 annual, strap-shaped, linear, bright green, sometimes glaucous, up to 50 cm long, and 2 cm wide leaves. The bulbs produce offsets. The roots are fibrous.

=== Generative characteristics ===
The 1–2 flowered, but usually solitary inflorescence with a hollow, 40–70(–90) cm tall scape has zygomorphic, bright red flowers. The flowers has 6 tepals. The androecium consists of 6 stamens. The gynoecium consists of 3 carpels. The stigma is trifid. The triangular 1.5–2.7 cm wide capsule fruit bears black, flat, winged, 9–11 mm long, and 6.5–8 mm wide seeds.

=== Cytology ===
Various chromosome counts have been observed: 2n = 60, 120, 150, 180.

== Taxonomy ==
It was first published as Amaryllis formosissima L. by Carl Linnaeus in 1753. A new genus Sprekelia Heist. was created by Lorenz Heister in 1748, honouring Johann Heinrich von Spreckelsen (1691–1764), who supplied the plants to Lorenz Heister. Heister however did not transfer any species to the new genus. It was placed into the genus Sprekelia Heist. as Sprekelia formosissima (L.) Herb. by William Herbert in 1821. The genus Sprekelia Heist. was merged into Zephyranthes Herb., due to genetic analyses. As Sprekelia Heist. is the earlier name than Zephyranthes Herb., it was proposed to conserve Zephyranthes Herb. against Sprekelia Heist.. Upon acceptance of this proposal, Sprekelia formosissima (L.) Herb. was merged into Zephyranthes Herb. as Zephyranthes formosissima (Linnaeus) Z.H. Feng published by Zhen-Hao Feng in 2024. It is placed in the tribe Hippeastreae.

=== Etymology ===
The specific epithet formosissima means "most beautiful" or "best formed".

=== Hybridisation ===
There are crosses between the genera Hippeastrum and Sprekelia, referred to as "x Hippeastrelia", as well as at least one cross between the three genera Hippeastrum, Sprekelia, and Zephyranthes, x Howardara.

== Distribution and habitat ==
Zephyranthes formosissima is endemic to Mexico. It has been introduced to the Mariana Islands. It occurs in various habitats, ranging from hot and xeric to temperate and humid conditions. It grows in rocky, loamy, or sandy soils on rocky slopes and outcrops.

== Ecology ==
=== Pollination ===
The flowers are adapted to hummingbird pollination.

== Cultivation ==
Zephyranthes formosissima is common in cultivation, planted in warm climates or raised in pots in colder climates, or planted and lifted, much as the gladiolus. Even when well grown, bulbs often do not bloom every year. The Royal Horticultural Society recommends it as an interesting choice for heated conservatories or greenhouses.
