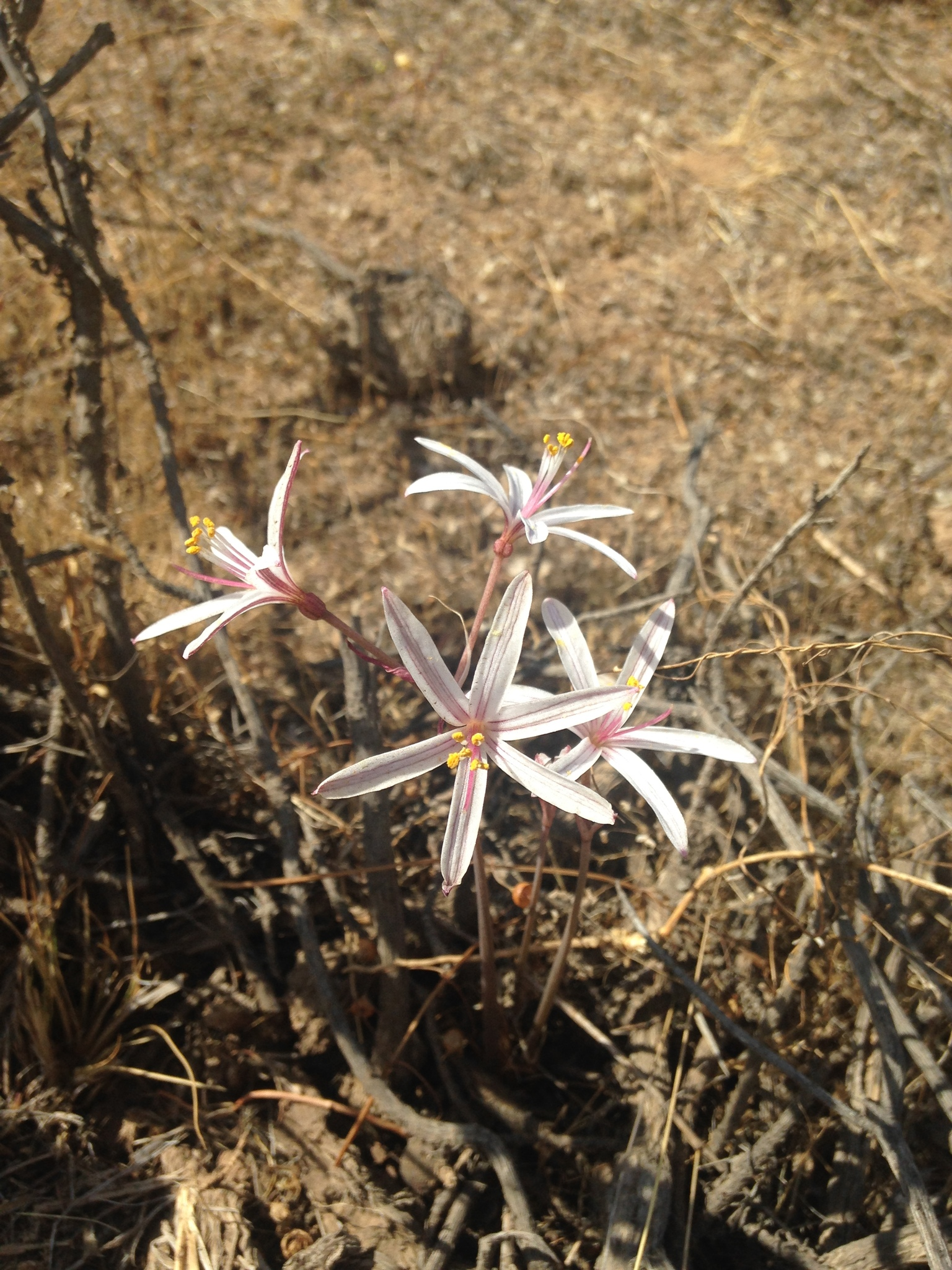
- Traubia modesta

Scientific classification
- Kingdom: Plantae
- Clade: Tracheophytes
- Clade: Angiosperms
- Clade: Monocots
- Order: Asparagales
- Family: Amaryllidaceae
- Subfamily: Amaryllidoideae
- Tribe: Hippeastreae
- Subtribe: Traubiinae
- Genus: Traubia; Moldenke
- Species: T. modesta

Binomial name
- Traubia modesta (F.Phil. ex Phil.) Ravenna

Synonyms
- Rhodophiala modesta Phil.; Hippeastrum modestum (Phil.) Baker; Amaryllis modesta (Phil.) Traub & Uphof; Lapiedra chilensis F.Phil. ex Phil.; Traubia chilensis (F.Phil. ex Phil.) Moldenke

= Traubia =

Species of plant

Traubia is a genus of Chilean plants in the Amaryllis family. Only one species is recognized, Traubia modesta, native to northern and central Chile.

== Description ==
=== Vegetative characteristics ===
Traubia modesta is a bulbous plant with small, ovoid, brown bulbs bearning linear, 8–12 cm long, and 2–3 mm wide leaves.

=== Generative characteristics ===
The inflorescence with a hollow, cylindrical, 35–50 cm long scape bears 1–5 zygomorphic, white flowers. The capsule fruit bears black, round, and flat seeds.

== Taxonomy ==
Within the tribe Hippeastreae, it is placed in the subtribe Traubiinae.

=== Etymology ===
The specific epithet modesta, from the Latin modestus, means modest moderate, or unassuming.

== Distribution and habitat ==
It occurs in the coastal regions of Coquimbo to O'Higgins Region, Chile.
