= Hippeastrum subg. Tocantinia =

Scientific classification
- Kingdom: Plantae
- Clade: Tracheophytes
- Clade: Angiosperms
- Clade: Monocots
- Order: Asparagales
- Family: Amaryllidaceae
- Subfamily: Amaryllidoideae
- Genus: Hippeastrum
- Subgenus: Hippeastrum subg. Tocantinia (Ravenna) Nic.García

Type species
- Hippeastrum mirum (Ravenna) Christenh. & Byng

Species
- See here
- It is endemic to Brazil

Subgenus of flowering plants

Hippeastrum subg. Tocantinia is a subgenus of the genus Hippeastrum endemic to Brazil.

== Description ==
=== Vegetative characteristics ===
Hippeastrum subg. Tocantinia are bulbous, 30–70 cm tall perennial herbs with globose bulbs bearing 3–8 annual leaves.

=== Generative characteristics ===
The single-flowered inflorescence with a hollow or solid, 15–70 cm long, and 2–7 mm wide scape bears a fragrant, zygomorphic flower.

=== Cytology ===
The chromosome count is 2n = 22.

== Taxonomy ==
It was first published as Tocantinia Ravenna by Ravenna in 2000 with Tocantinia mira Ravenna as the type species. It was merged into the genus Hippeastrum Herb. as Hippeastrum subg. Tocantinia (Ravenna) Nic.García by Nicolás García Berguecio in 2019.

=== Species ===
It has three species:

- Hippeastrum dutilhianum (Büneker, R.E.Bastian & C.M.Costa) Christenh. & Byng
- Hippeastrum mirum (Ravenna) Christenh. & Byng
- Hippeastrum stigmovittatum (Büneker, R.E.Bastian & C.M.Costa) Christenh. & Byng

=== Etymology ===
The subgeneric name Tocantinia refers to Tocantins, Brazil.

== Distribution and habitat ==
It is endemic to Brazil, where it occurs in the states of Bahia, Minas Gerais, and Tocantins.
