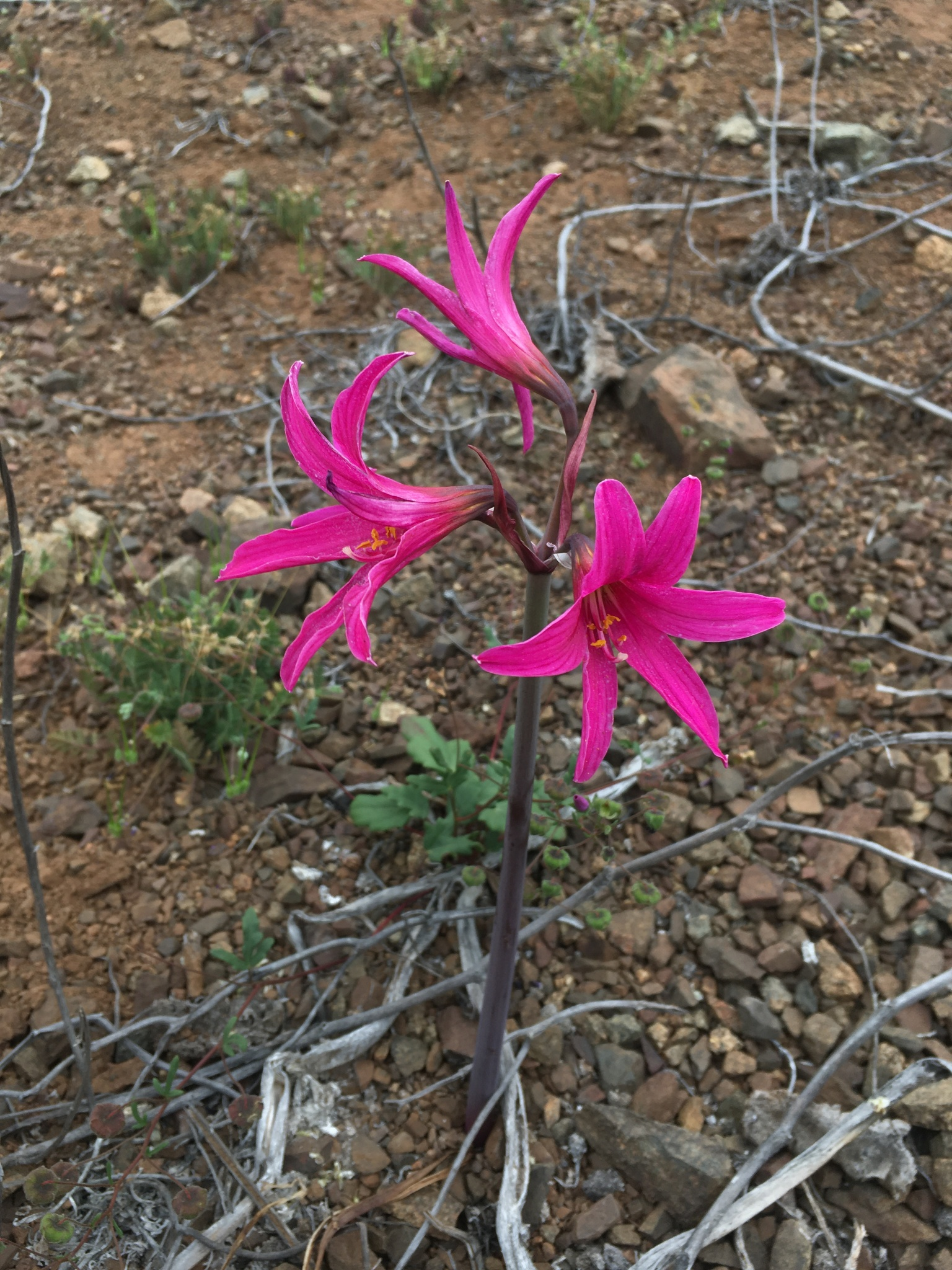

Scientific classification
- Kingdom: Plantae
- Clade: Tracheophytes
- Clade: Angiosperms
- Clade: Monocots
- Order: Asparagales
- Family: Amaryllidaceae
- Subfamily: Amaryllidoideae
- Tribe: Hippeastreae
- Subtribe: Traubiinae
- Genus: Paposoa; Nic.García
- Species: P. laeta

Binomial name
- Paposoa laeta (Phil.) Nic.García
- It is endemic to Chile

Synonyms
- List: Amaryllis atacamensis Traub & Uphof; Eremolirion laetum (Phil.) Nic.García; Rhodolirium laetum (Phil.) Ravenna; Rhodophiala laeta Phil.; Amaryllis uniflora (Phil.) Traub & Uphof; Habranthus pratensis var. quadriflorus Herb.; Hippeastrum uniflorum (Phil.) Baker; Rhodophiala uniflora Phil.

= Paposoa =

Species of plant

Paposoa laeta is the only species of the monotypic genus Paposoa in the family Amaryllidaceae endemic to northern and central Chile.

== Description ==
=== Vegetative characteristics ===
Paposoa laeta is a bulbous, over 10 cm tall plant with ovoid, tunicate bulbs bearing flat, linear, 30–60 cm long, and 5–9 mm wide leaves.

=== Generative characteristics ===
The inflorescence with a hollow, 10–30 cm long, and 2–4 mm wide scape bears 1–7 violet to purple, zygomorphic flowers. The flowers have 6 tepals. The androecium consists of 6 stamens. The gynoecium consists of 3 carpels. The trilocular capsule fruit bears flat, shiny, black seeds.

=== Cytology ===
The chromosome count is 2n = 16.

== Taxonomy ==
It was described as Rhodophiala laeta Phil. by Rodolfo Amando Philippi in 1860. A new genus Eremolirion Nic.García was described by Nicolás García Berguecio in 2019, but due to confusion with the similarly named Eremiolirion J.C.Manning & F.Forest (Tecophilaeaceae), a new genus Paposoa Nic.García and species Paposoa laeta (Phil.) Nic.García was required and published by García in 2020. Within the tribe Hippeastreae, it is placed in the subtribe Traubiinae.

=== Etymology ===
The generic name Paposoa refers to Paposo, Chile. The specific epithet laeta means bright,

== Distribution and habitat ==
It occurs in the Atacama and Antofagasta regions, where it is found in desert and desert fog oases (Lomas).

== Conservation ==
It has a restricted habitat and distribution.
