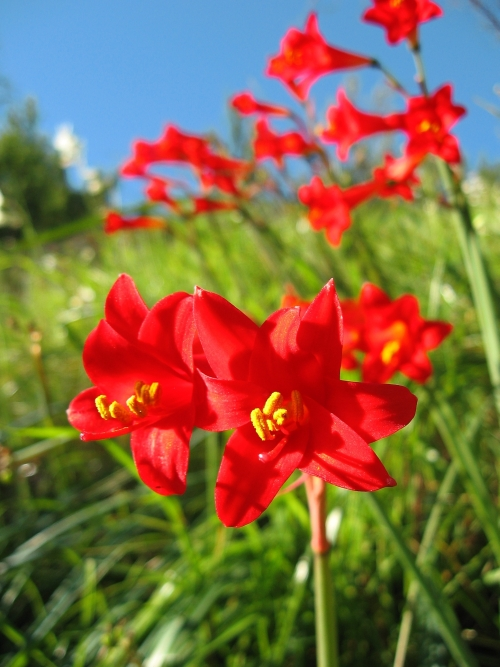
- Phycella cyrtanthoides

Scientific classification
- Kingdom: Plantae
- Clade: Tracheophytes
- Clade: Angiosperms
- Clade: Monocots
- Order: Asparagales
- Family: Amaryllidaceae
- Subfamily: Amaryllidoideae
- Subtribe: Traubiinae
- Genus: Phycella; Lindl.

Type species
- Phycella cyrtanthoides (Sims) Lindl.

Species
- See text

Synonyms
- Amaryllis ignea Lindl.; Famatina maulensis Ravenna; Miltinea Ravenna

= Phycella =

Genus of flowering plants

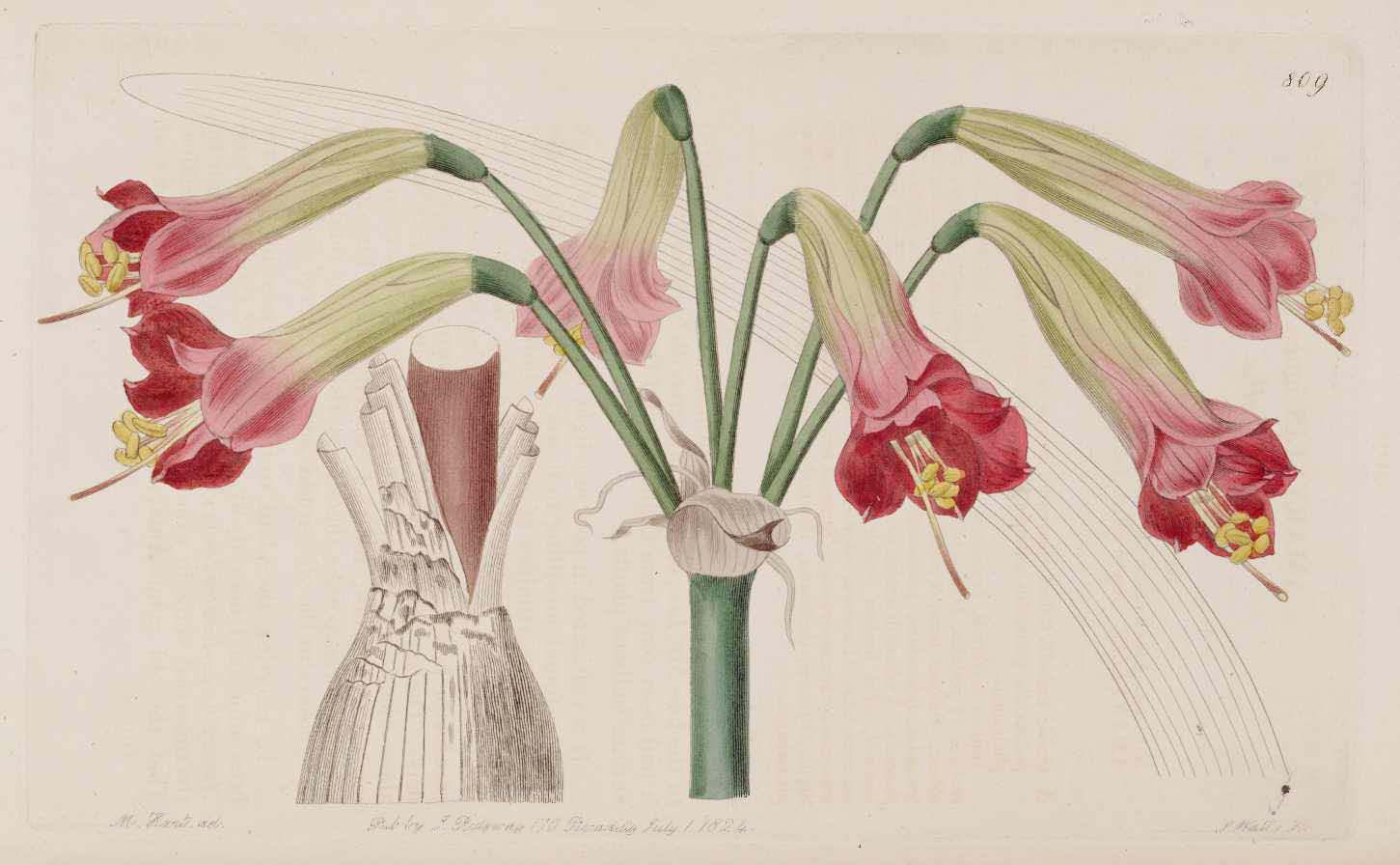
Phycella cyrtanthoides, original specimen, described as Amaryllis ignea, 1824

Phycella is a genus of herbaceous, perennial bulbous flowering plants belonging to the family Amaryllidaceae, subfamily Amaryllidoideae. The genus consists of five species distributed from central Chile to northwestern Argentina.

The type species, P. cyrtanthoides, is commonly known as añañuca in Chile, and the star Gliese 367 is named after it.

== Taxonomy ==
The genus was described by John Lindley in 1825. After further examining specimens of Amaryllis ignea (see illustration) that he had described the previous year as Amaryllis, with some reservation, Lindley concluded they were a separate genus, naming two species, P. ignea, and P. cyrtanthoides (previously A. cyrtanthoides). Subsequently, it was considered these were the same plant, and P. ignea was reassigned to a synonym for P. cyrtanthoides.

=== Phylogeny ===
Phycella is located in the American (Hippeastroid) clade of the Amaryllidoideaetribe, where it is placed in tribe Hippeastreae, subtribe Traubiinae. In molecular phylogenetic analysis, Phycella forms a sister group to the remainder of the Hippeastreae. In 1996 the Müller-Doblies' had situated it in subtribe Hippeastrinae based on morphological criteria, by submerging it in Hippeastrum. A detailed study of in-depth relations within Hippeastreae revealed a more complicated situation with regard to the Chilean-Argentinian taxa which had not been well represented in earlier studies. There was strong support for two major clades, representing two subtribes, with Phycella and three other genera (but not Hippeastrum) forming the Traubiinae. This study also showed that one species of Famatina (F. maulensis) segregated with Phycella, and was therefore submerged in it as Phycella herbertiana. By contrast the remaining three Famatina species segregated with Rhodophiala and were therefore grouped in Hippeastrinae together with Hippeastrum. Consequently, Famatina has been extinguished as separate genus. The genus Placea was also submerged in Phycella, resulting in about 13 species in total.

=== Subdivision ===
13–14 species are described:

- Phycella amoena Nic.García syn. Placea amoena
- Phycella arzae (Phil.) Nic.García syn. Placea arzae
- Phycella australis Ravenna
- Phycella brevituba Herb.
- Phycella chilensis (L’Hér.) Grau ex Nic.García syn. Amaryllis chilensis L’Hér.
- Phycella cyrtanthoides (Sims) Lindl.
- Phycella davidii (Ravenna) Nic.García syn. Placea davidii
- Phycella fulgens (Hook.f.) Nic.García, syn. Habranthus fulgens Hook.f.
- Phycella germainii (Phil.) Nic.García syn. Placea germainii Phil.
- Phycella herbertiana Lindl. syn. Famatina maulensis Ravenna
- Phycella lutea (Phil.) Nic.García Placea lutea Phil.
- Phycella maulensis (Ravenna) Nic.García & J.M.Watson syn. Famatina maulensis Ravenna
- Phycella ornata (Miers) Nic.García syn. Placea ornata Miers
- Phycella scarlatina Ravenna

== Bibliography ==
- The International Plant Names Index Phycella.
- "World Checklist of Selected Plant Families". Royal Botanic Gardens, Kew.
- Lindley, John (1824). "Amaryllis ignea". The Botanical Register. 10: 809.
- Lindley, John (1825). "Note upon Amaryllis ignea Supra vol. 10. fol. 809". The Botanical Register. 11: ad 928.
- Müller-Doblies, U.; Müller-Doblies, D. (1996). "Tribes and subtribes and some species combinations in Amaryllidaceae J St Hil R Dahlgren & al. 1985". Feddes Repertorium. 107 (5–6): S.c.1–S.c.9.
- Meerow, A.W.; Guy, C.L.; Li, Q.-B.; Yang, S.-L. (2000). "Phylogeny of the American Amaryllidaceae Based on nrDNA ITS Sequences" (PDF). Systematic Botany. 25 (4): 708–726. doi:10.2307/2666729. JSTOR 2666729. S2CID 20392462. Archived from the original (PDF) on 23 September 2015.
- García, Nicolás; Meerow, Alan W.; Soltis, Douglas E.; Soltis, Pamela S. (1 March 2014). "Testing Deep Reticulate Evolution in Amaryllidaceae Tribe Hippeastreae (Asparagales) with ITS and Chloroplast Sequence Data". Systematic Botany. 39 (1): 75–89. doi:10.1600/036364414X678099. S2CID 86117335.
- —; Meerow, Alan W.; Arroyo-Leuenberger, Silvia; Oliveira, Renata S.; Dutilh, Julie H.; Soltis, Pamela S.; Judd, Walter S. (June 2019). "Generic classification of Amaryllidaceae tribe Hippeastreae". Taxon. 68 (3): 481–498. doi:10.1002/tax.12062. S2CID 202854432.(With corrections published 2020)
- "The Plant List: a working list of all known plant species. Version: 1.1". Royal Botanic Gardens, Kew and Missouri Botanical Garden. September 2013.
- "Tropicos". Missouri Botanical Garden. 2015.
- Media related to Phycella at Wikimedia Commons
