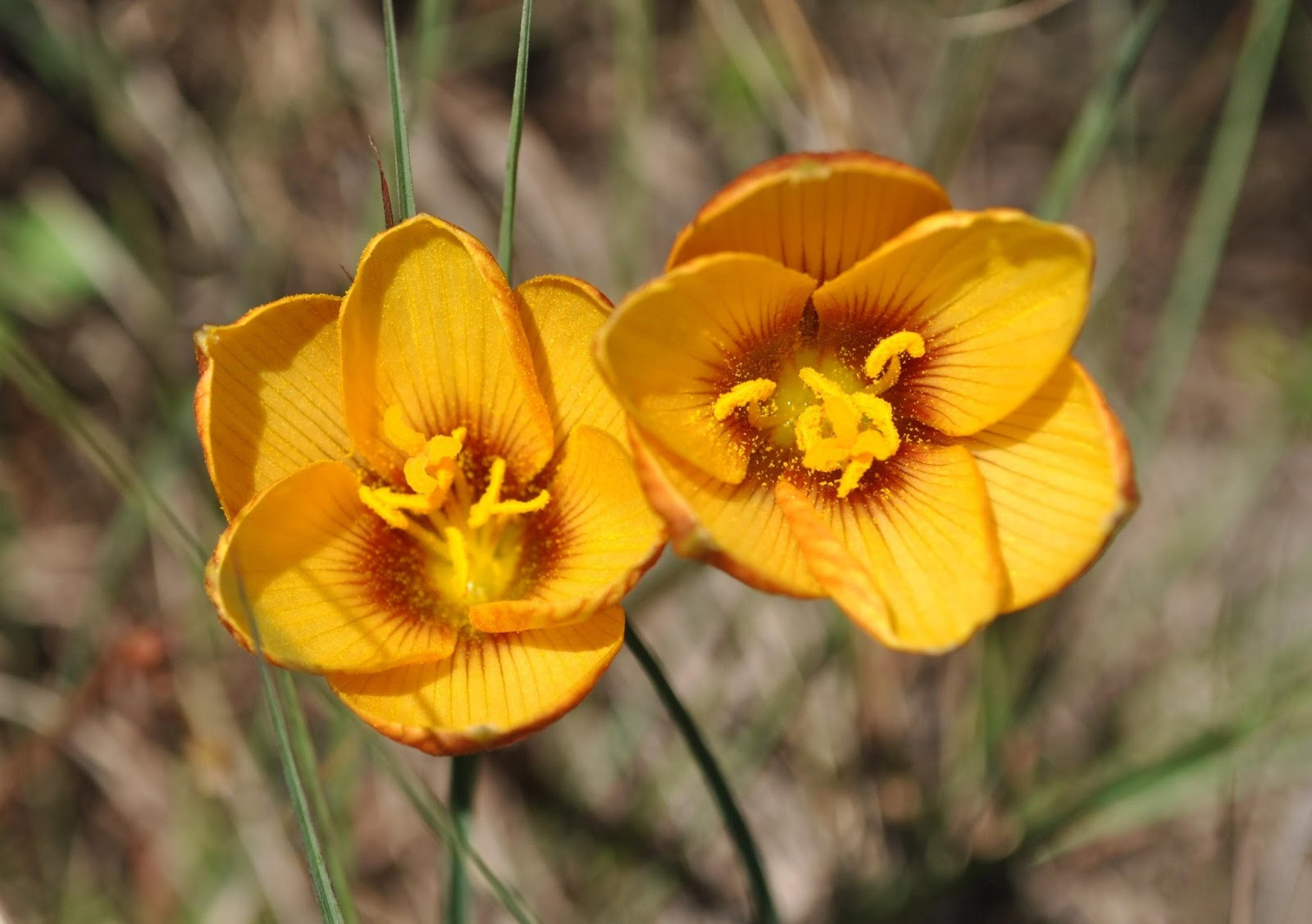
- Zephyranthes tubispatha flowers

Scientific classification
- Kingdom: Plantae
- Clade: Tracheophytes
- Clade: Angiosperms
- Clade: Monocots
- Order: Asparagales
- Family: Amaryllidaceae
- Subfamily: Amaryllidoideae
- Genus: Zephyranthes
- Subgenus: Zephyranthes subg. Habranthus (Herb.) Nic.García

Type species
- Zephyranthes gracilifolia (Herb.) G.Nicholson

Species
- See here

Synonyms
- Habranthus Herb.

= Zephyranthes subg. Habranthus =

Subgenus of flowering plants

Zephyranthes subg. Habranthus is a subgenus within the genus Zephyranthes in the family Amaryllidaceae. It was a formerly recognized as the separate genus Habranthus. It contains tender herbaceous flowering bulbs in the subfamily Amaryllidoideae of the family Amaryllidaceae. It is now included within a more broadly circumscribed genus Zephyranthes. The genus was first identified by pioneering bulb enthusiast William Herbert in 1824.

== Description ==
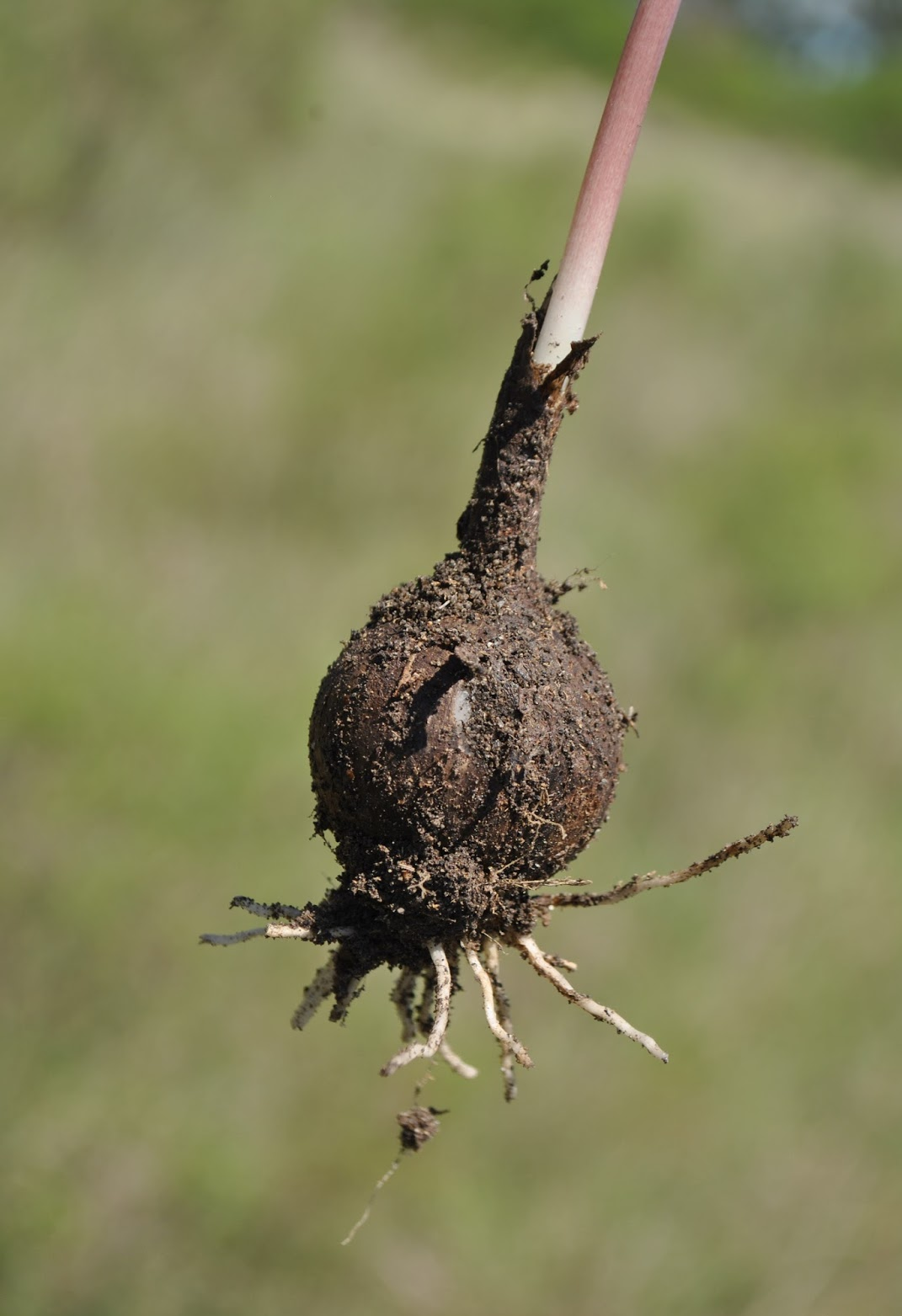
Zephyranthes tubispatha bulb

=== Vegetative characteristics ===
Zephyranthes subg. Habranthus are bulbous, 10–30 cm tall plants with oblong to globose bulbs and annual, linear to filiform, 15–30 cm long, and 3–10 mm wide leaves.

=== Generative characteristics ===
The 1–4-flowered inflorescence bears pedicellate, zygomorphic flowers.

== Taxonomy ==
It was first published as Habranthus Herb. by William Herbert in 1824 with Habranthus gracilifolius Herb. as the type species. Habranthus was formerly regarded separate from Zephyranthes; distinctive features included holding its flowers at an angle rather than upright, and possessing unequal stamens. It was merged into the genus Zephyranthes Herb. as Zephyranthes subg. Habranthus (Herb.) Nic. García published by Nicolás García Berguecio in 2019. At one stage, Habranthus was considered a subgenus of the closely related Hippeastrum. It was later treated as a full genus in the tribe Hippeastreae. However, molecular phylogenetic studies from 2000 onwards showed that although Hippeastreae was monophyletic, many of the genera placed in the tribe were not; in particular, Habranthus, Zephyranthes and Sprekelia formed a complex in which traditionally placed species were intermingled. Accordingly, in 2019, a broad circumscription of Zephyranthes was proposed, including the former genus Habranthus. This proposal has been accepted by Plants of the World Online, among other taxonomic databases.

== Cultivation ==
In the United States, species formerly placed in Habranthus, like other rain lilies, are regarded as "heirloom plants", although not widely used in mainstream landscapes, perhaps because their bloom time, dependent on rain, is erratic. Nevertheless, the bulbs are rugged and easy to grow in USDA Hardiness Zones 8-10 and are recognized among bulb specialists as possessing distinct landscape value in appropriate areas of the world. In colder regions they may be grown in sheltered sites, or in pots kept frost-free in winter.

The most commonly grown species are the pink-flowered Zephyranthes robusta (formerly Habranthus robustus) and the yellow-flowered Zephyranthes tubispatha (formerly Habranthus tubispathus).

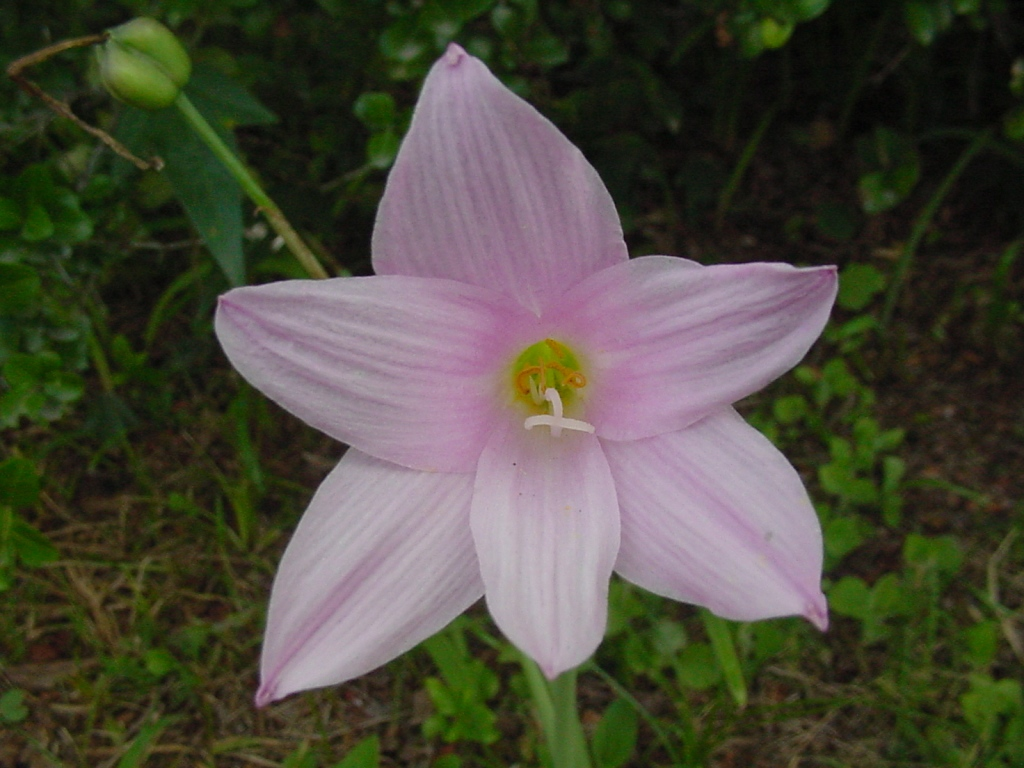
Zephyranthes robusta (syn. H. robustus)

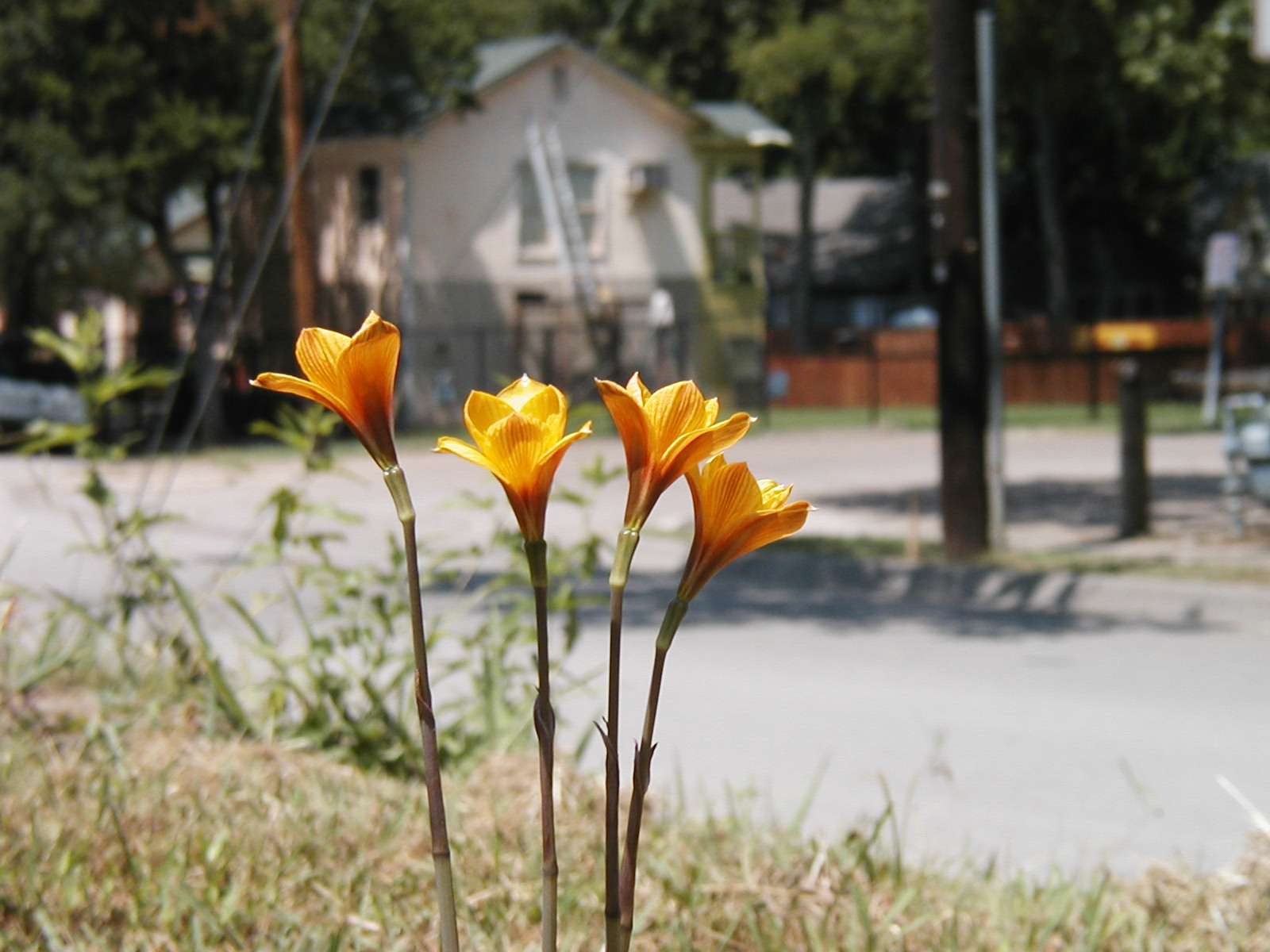
Zephyranthes tubispatha (syn. H. tubispathus), Denton, Texas

== See also ==
- List of plants known as lily
