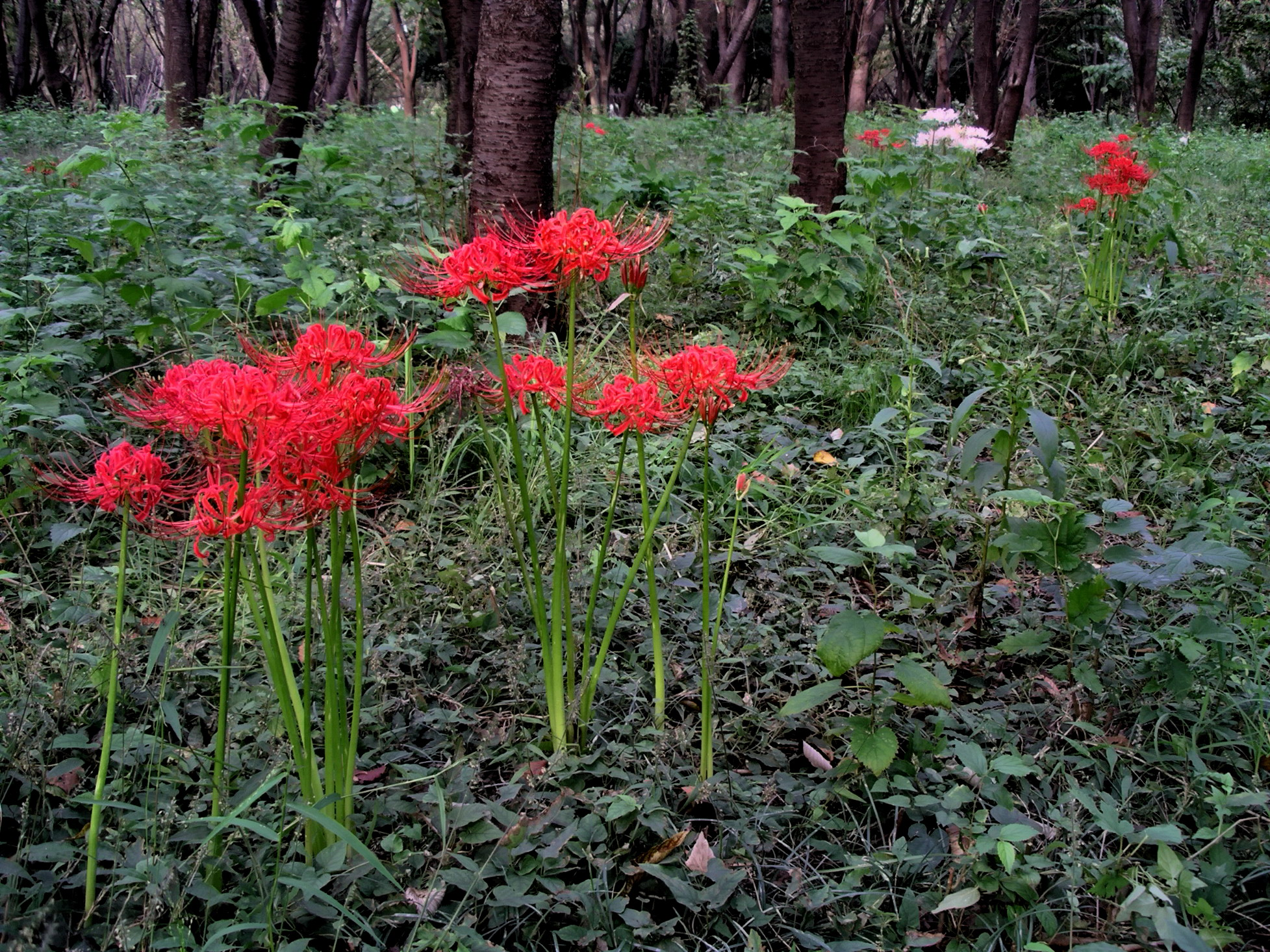
- Lycoris radiata a species with long stamens

Scientific classification
- Kingdom: Plantae
- Clade: Tracheophytes
- Clade: Angiosperms
- Clade: Monocots
- Order: Asparagales
- Family: Amaryllidaceae
- Subfamily: Amaryllidoideae
- Tribe: Lycorideae
- Genus: Lycoris; Herb.

Synonyms
- Pleurastis Raf.; Orexis Salisb.

= Lycoris (plant) =

Genus of flowering plants

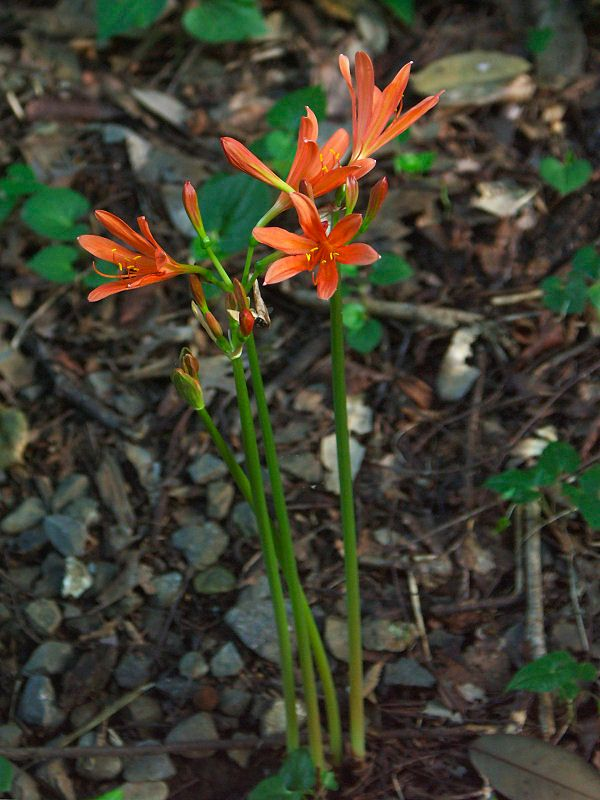
Lycoris sanguinea, a species with short stamens

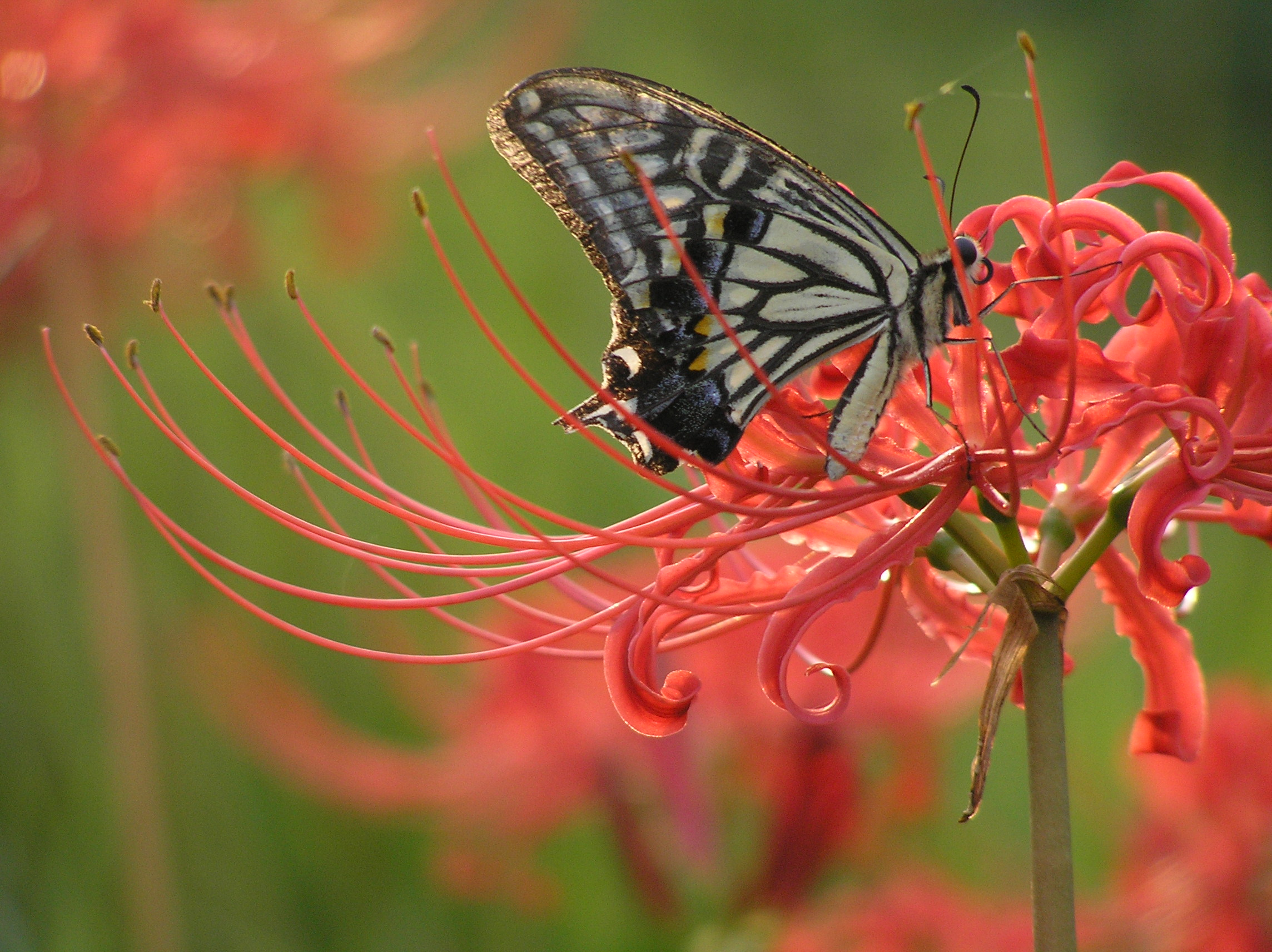
Lycoris and butterfly (Papilio xuthus) in Japan

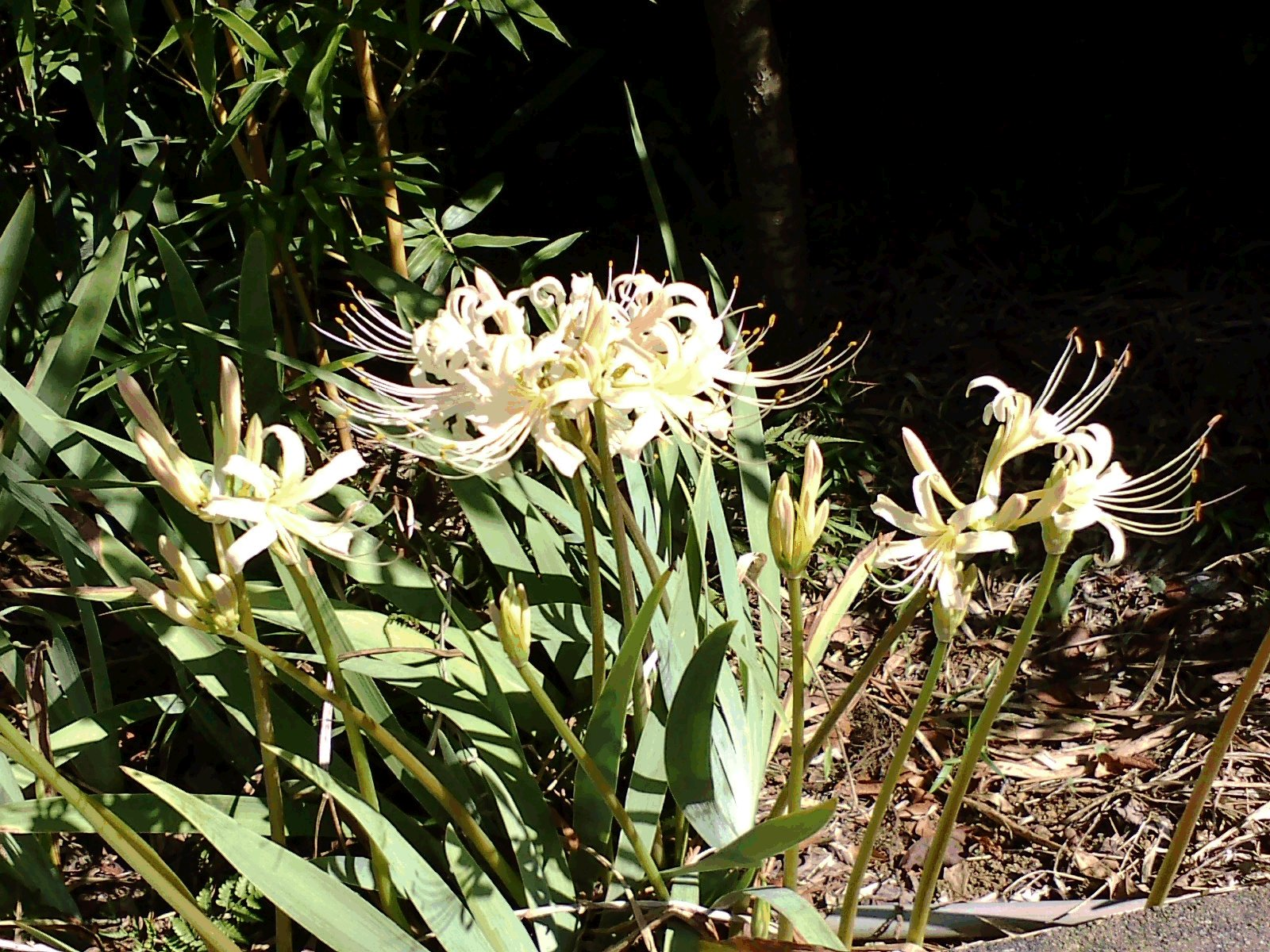
Lycoris × albiflora in Chiba, Japan

Lycoris is a genus of about 20 species of flowering plants in the family Amaryllidaceae, subfamily Amaryllidoideae. They are native to eastern and southern Asia in China, Japan, southern Korea, northern Vietnam, northern Laos, northern Thailand, northern Myanmar, Nepal, northern Pakistan, Afghanistan, and eastern Iran. In English they are also called hurricane lilies or cluster amaryllis. The genus shares the English name spider lily with two other related genera.

== Description ==
They are bulb-producing perennial plants. The leaves are long and slender, 30–60 cm long and only 0.5–2 cm broad. The scape is erect, 30–70 cm tall, bearing a terminal umbel of four to eight flowers, which can be white, yellow, orange, or red. The flowers divide into two types, those with very long, filamentous stamens two or three times as long as the tepals (subgenus Lycoris; e.g. Lycoris radiata), and those with shorter stamens not much longer than the tepals (subgenus Symmanthus Traub & Moldenke; e.g. Lycoris sanguinea). The fruit is a three-valved capsule containing several black seeds. Many of the species are sterile, reproducing only vegetatively, and are probably of hybrid origin; several additional known hybrids occur.

== Selected species ==
As of April 2015, the World Checklist of Selected Plant Families recognizes 22 species and one hybrid:

- Lycoris albiflora Koidz. (treated as the hybrid L. × albiflora by some sources) – white spider lily - Jiangsu, Korea, Kyushu
- Lycoris anhuiensis Y.Xu & G.J.Fan - Anhui, Jiangsu
- Lycoris argentea Worsley - Myanmar
- Lycoris aurea (L'Hér.) Herb. (syn. Nerine aurea) – golden spider lily - China, Japan incl Ryukyu Is, Indochina, Taiwan
- Lycoris caldwellii Traub – magic lily - Jiangsu, Jiangxi, Zhejiang
- Lycoris chinensis Traub – yellow surprise lily - Henan, Jiangsu, Shaanxi, Sichuan, Zhejiang, Korea
- Lycoris flavescens M.Kim & S.Lee - Korea
- Lycoris guangxiensis Y.Xu & G.J.Fan - Guangxi
- Lycoris haywardii Traub - Japan
- Lycoris houdyshelii Traub - Jiangsu, Zhejiang, Matsu Islands, Japan
- Lycoris incarnata Comes ex Sprenger – peppermint surprise lily - Hubei, Yunnan
- Lycoris josephinae Traub - Sichuan
- Lycoris koreana Nakai - Korea, †Japan
- Lycoris longituba Y.C.Hsu & G.J.Fan – long tube surprise lily - Jiangsu
- Lycoris radiata (L'Hér.) Herb. – spider lily, red spider lily - China, Korea, Japan, Matsu Islands, Nepal; naturalized in Seychelles and in scattered places in United States
- Lycoris rosea Traub & Moldenke - Jiangsu, Zhejiang
- Lycoris sanguinea Maxim. – orange spider lily - Japan
- Lycoris shaanxiensis Y.Xu & Z.B.Hu - Sichuan, Shaanxi
- Lycoris sprengeri Comes ex Baker – tie dye surprise lily - Anhui, Hubei, Jiangsu, Zhejiang, Matsu Islands
- Lycoris squamigera Maxim. – naked lady, surprise lily, magic lily, resurrection lily - Jiangsu, Shandong, Zhejiang, Japan, Korea; naturalized in Ohio, Tennessee
- Lycoris straminea Lindl. - Jiangsu, Zhejiang
- Lycoris uydoensis M.Kim - Korea

formerly included

A few names have been coined using the name Lycoris but referring to species now considered better suited to other genera (Griffinia and Ungernia). Here are links to help you find appropriate information.

- Lycoris hyacinthina - Griffinia hyacinthina
- Lycoris radiata - Ungernia trisphaera
- Lycoris severzowii - Ungernia severzowii

Hybrids

- Lycoris × chejuensis chejuensis K.H.Tae & S.C.Ko - Korea

In phylogenetic analyses based on chloroplast genes, Hori et al. found that all species of Lycoris they examined were nested within L. radiata. They suggest that the species of Lycoris presently recognized may not be distinct.

== Cultivation and uses ==
Lycoris are extensively cultivated as ornamental plants in China and Japan, and also in other warm temperate regions of the world. In Japan, they are widely used at the edges of rice paddy fields to provide a strip of bright flowers in the summer, and over 230 cultivars have been selected for garden use. They are locally naturalised in the southeastern United States, where they are often called hurricane flowers, due to their blooming period coinciding with the peak of hurricane season. In China, people often use them as decorations in festivals or celebrations.

== Legends ==
Since these scarlet flowers usually bloom near cemeteries around the autumnal equinox, they are described in Chinese and Japanese translations of the Lotus Sutra as ominous flowers that grow in Diyu (also known as Hell), or pinyin: Huángquán (traditional Chinese: 黃泉; simplified Chinese: 黄泉), and guide the dead into the next reincarnation.

By the time the flowers of Lycoris bloom, their leaves have long since withered and died back. Likewise, when their leaves are in full growth, the flowers are absent. This distinctive growth habit (shared by the closely-relates genus Ungernia) has given rise to a number of legends. A famous one concerns two elves: Mañju (曼珠; Mànzhū), who guarded the flower, and Saka (沙華; 沙华; Shāhuá), who guarded the leaves. Out of curiosity, they defied their fate of guarding the herb alone and managed to meet each other. At first sight, they fell in love with each other. God, exasperated by their waywardness, separated the miserable couple, and laid a curse on them as a punishment: the flowers of Mañju shall never meet the leaves of Saka again.

It was said that when the couple met after death in Diyu, they vowed to meet each other after reincarnation. However, neither of them could keep their word.

In commemoration of the couple, some call the herbs "mañjusaka" (曼珠沙華; 曼珠沙华), a compound of "mañju" and "saka", instead of their standard name, shísuàn (石蒜). The same kanji name is used in Japanese, where it is pronounced manju-shage.

Some other legends have it that when a person sees someone that they may never meet again, these flowers would bloom along the path. Perhaps because of these sorrowful legends, Japanese people often used these flowers in funerals. The common Japanese name for Lycoris, higanbana (彼岸花), is literally "higan (the far shore of the Sanzu River) flower", or a decorative flower of the afterlife in Sukhavati (極楽浄土, Gokuraku Jyōdo).

== Gallery ==
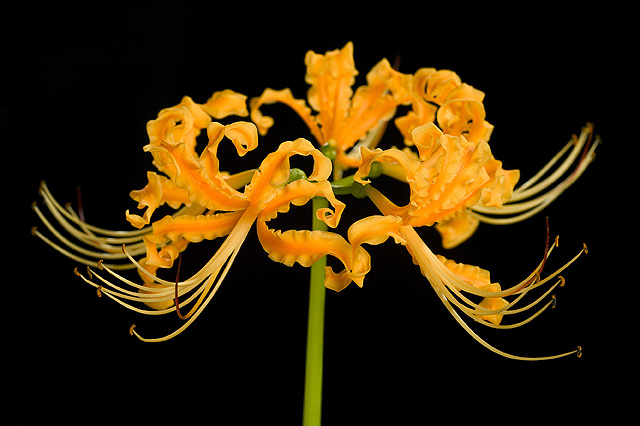
Lycoris aurea, a species with long stamens

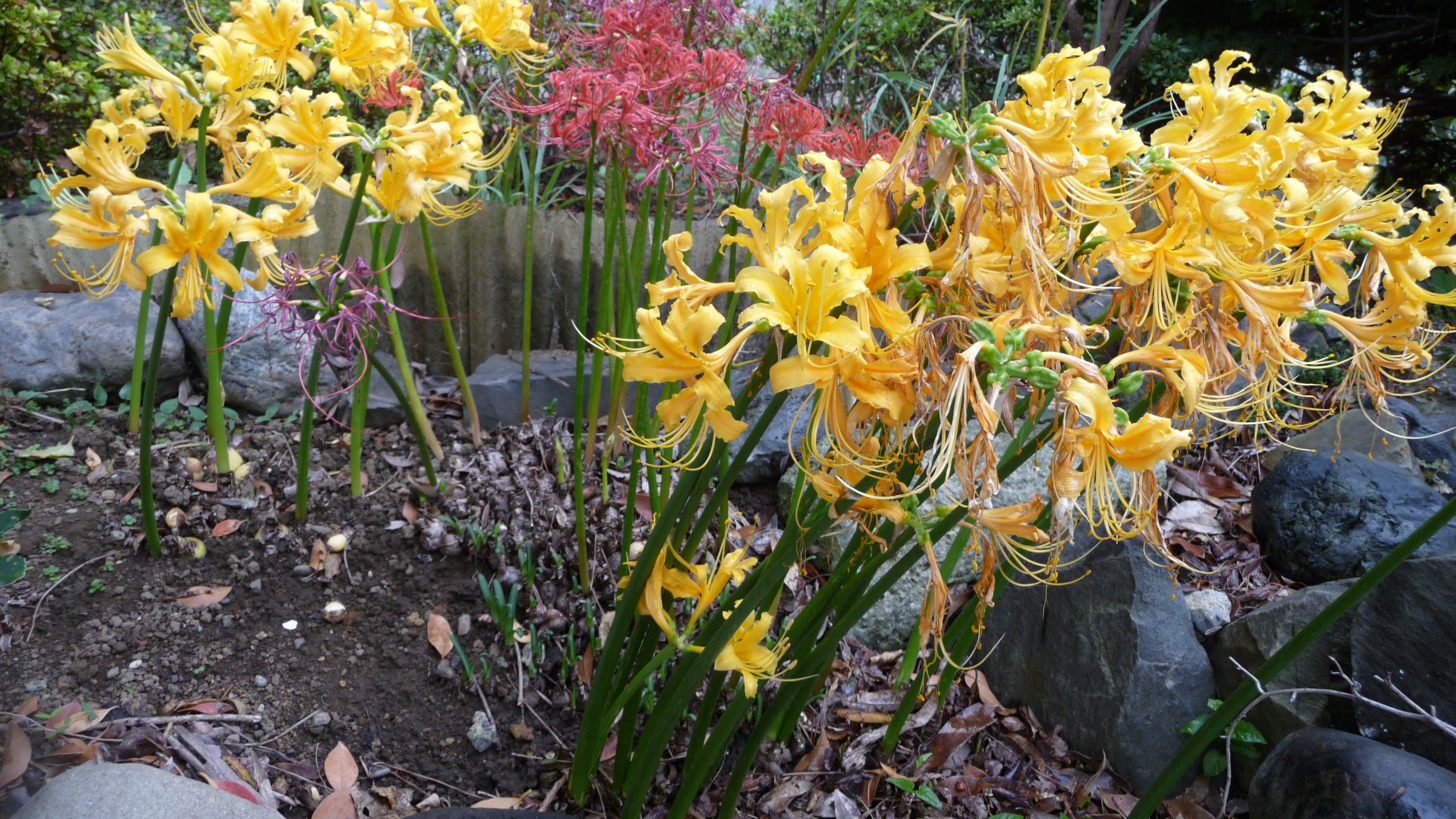
Lycoris aurea (yellow) and Lycoris radiata (red) in Chiba Japan

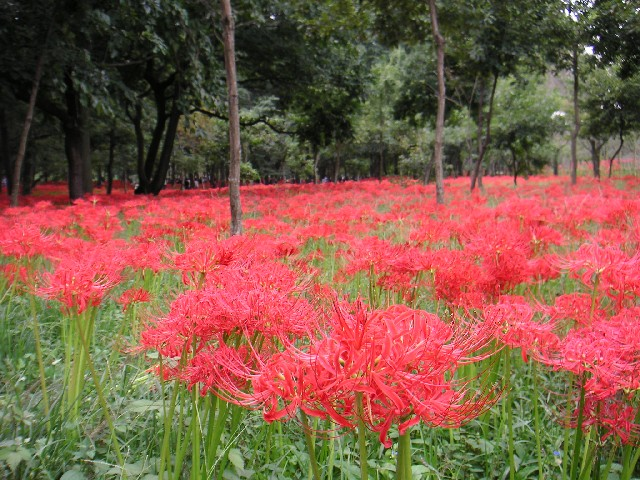
Lycoris radiata is an important cultural icon in Japan

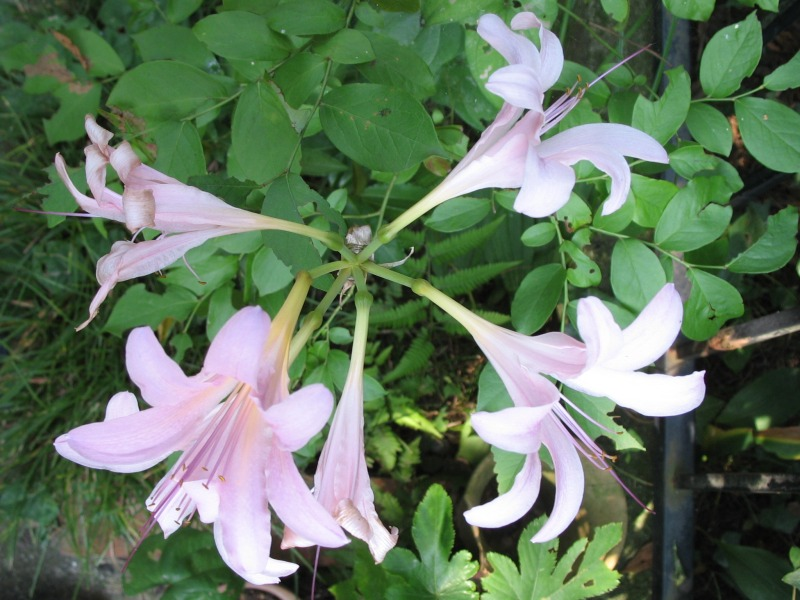
Lycoris squamigera, a species with short stamens

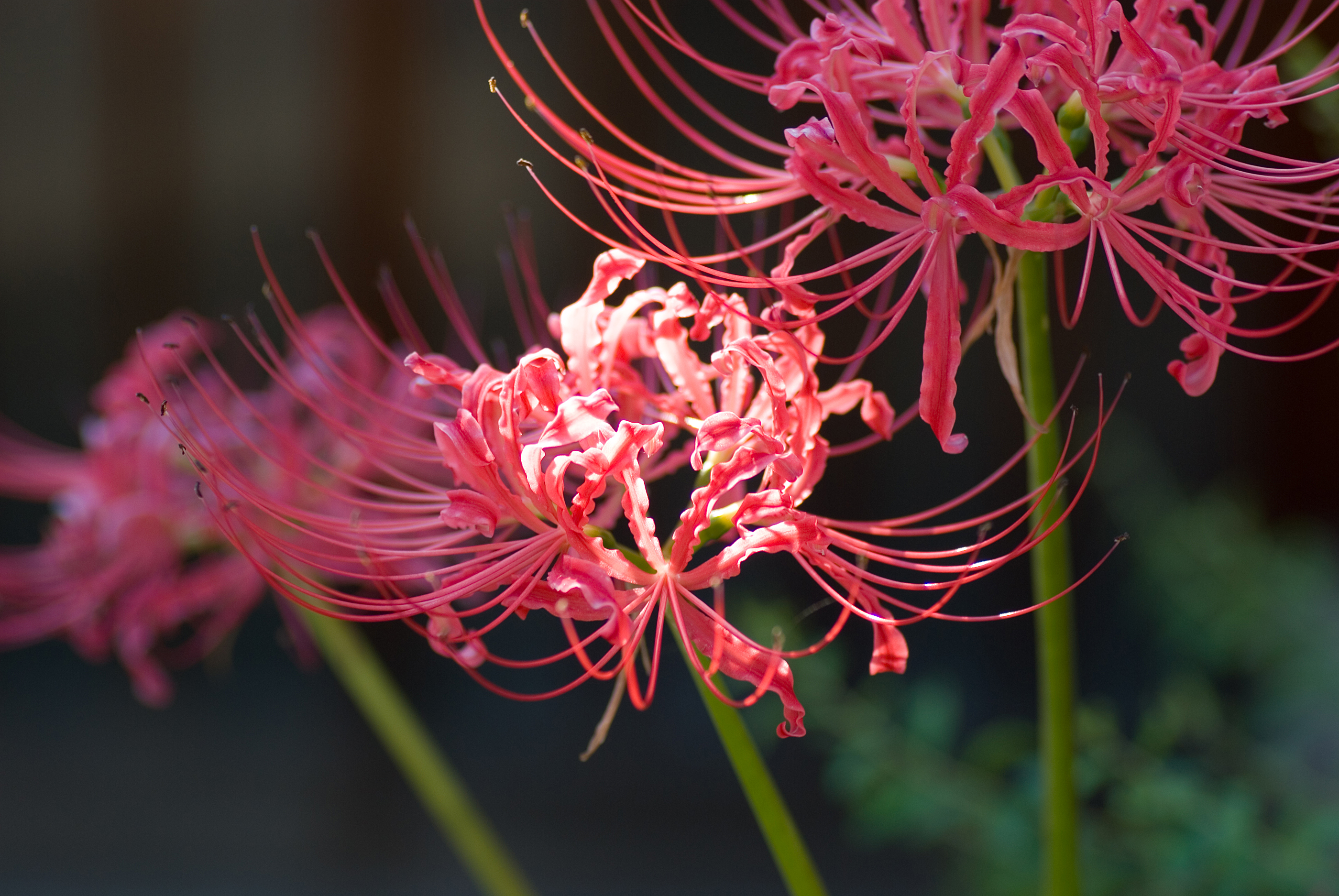
Lycoris radiata, Red spider lily

== See also ==
- List of plants known as lily
