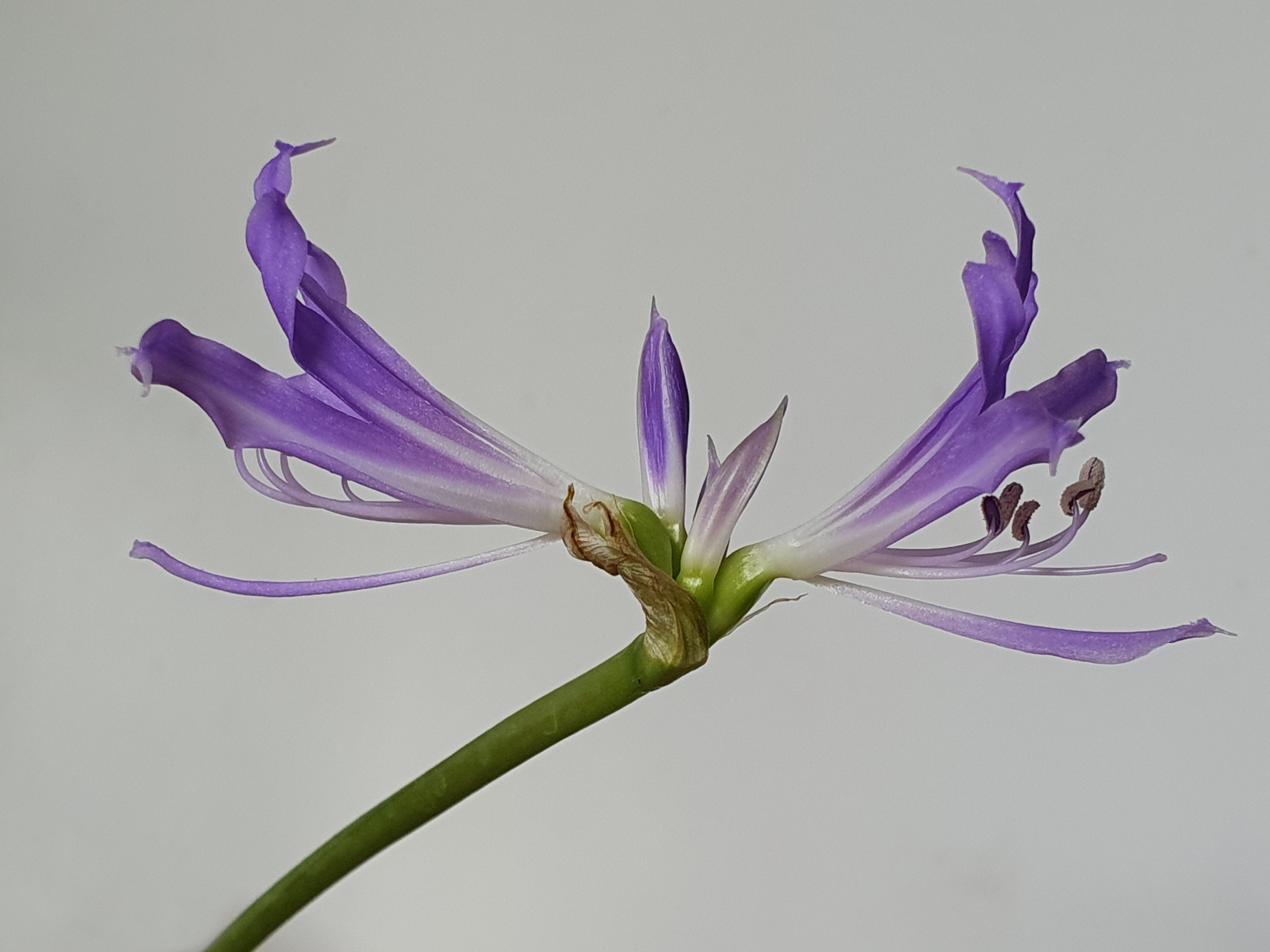
- Lateral view of Griffinia espiritensis var. ituberae inflorescence

Scientific classification
- Kingdom: Plantae
- Clade: Tracheophytes
- Clade: Angiosperms
- Clade: Monocots
- Order: Asparagales
- Family: Amaryllidaceae
- Subfamily: Amaryllidoideae
- Genus: Griffinia
- Subgenus: Griffinia subg. Griffinia

Species
- See here
- It is endemic to Brazil

= Griffinia subg. Griffinia =

Subgenus of flowering plants

Griffinia subg. Griffinia is a subgenus of the genus Griffinia endemic to Brazil.

== Description ==
The species of Griffinia subg. Griffinia have up to 6 cm wide bulbs with up to 20(–30) cm long, attractive, petiolate, symmetrical, narrowly elliptic to broadly ovate leaves often with white spotting. The 4–20-flowered inflorescence with 1–2 free or basally fused bracts bears highly zygomorphic, 1.5–11 cm long, diurnal, inodorous, lilac to almost blue, or rarely white flowers. In the blue-flowered species, the perigonal tube is reduced. The tepals are arranged in 2 groups in a 5 + 1 pattern. The 6 stamens with white, greyish, or very rarely yellowish pollen are arranged in 2 groups of 5 + 1, where five stamens of variable length are declinate, and the sixth is assurgent or sometimes absent. The positioning of the episepalous, upwardly reflexed stamens grouped apart from the others, as well as the occasional absence of the 6th stamen are a unique condition for the family Amaryllidaceae. The chromosome count is 2n = 20, but some individuals are triploid. The triploid individuals show reduced pollen fertility.

== Taxonomy ==
The subgenus Griffinia subg. Hyline (Herb.) Ravenna was described by Pedro Felix Ravenna in 1969 and as a result the autonymous Griffinia subg. Griffinia was created.

== Distribution and habitat ==
The species of Griffinia subg. Griffinia, which are adapted to very low light levels, are found in coastal Atlantic Rainforest and its inland extensions, Brazil.

== Conservation ==
These species are endangered by habitat destruction.

== Uses ==
The plants have great unexploited horticultural potential as ornamental plants.
