= Xanthopastis moctezuma =

Scientific classification
- Kingdom: Animalia
- Phylum: Arthropoda
- Clade: Pancrustacea
- Class: Insecta
- Order: Lepidoptera
- Superfamily: Noctuoidea
- Family: Noctuidae
- Genus: Xanthopastis
- Species: X. moctezuma

Binomial name
- Xanthopastis moctezuma Dyar, 1913

Species of moth

Xanthopastis moctezuma is a moth of the family Noctuidae. It is found from Mexico north to Brownsville, Texas, but appears to be replaced by Xanthopastis regnatrix elsewhere in Texas.
