= Griffinia nocturna =

Scientific classification
- Kingdom: Plantae
- Clade: Tracheophytes
- Clade: Angiosperms
- Clade: Monocots
- Order: Asparagales
- Family: Amaryllidaceae
- Subfamily: Amaryllidoideae
- Tribe: Griffineae
- Genus: Griffinia
- Subgenus: Griffinia subg. Hyline
- Species: G. nocturna

Binomial name
- Griffinia nocturna Ravenna

Synonyms
- Hyline nocturna

Species of flowering plant

Griffinia nocturna is a bulbous species of flowering plant which is endemic to Brazil. Together with another closely related species, Griffinia gardneriana, it forms its own subgenus in the genus Griffinia named Griffinia subg. Hyline. A distinguishing feature of G. nocturna is that the flowers are white while almost all of the other members of the genus have lilac or blue flowers. They are scented, collected into an umbel. The plant blooms during the night and the flowers have already faded by the next day. The leaves are green and oblanceolate. Endemic to Brazil, it grows in arid or semi-arid regions from central to northern Brazil, in zones known as caatingas.
