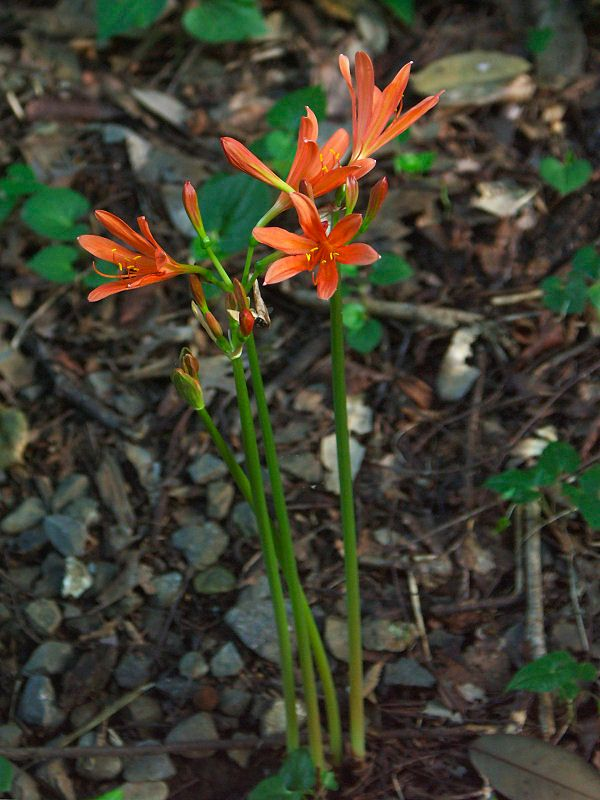
- Lycoris sanguinea

Scientific classification
- Kingdom: Plantae
- Clade: Tracheophytes
- Clade: Angiosperms
- Clade: Monocots
- Order: Asparagales
- Family: Amaryllidaceae
- Subfamily: Amaryllidoideae
- Tribe: Lycorideae; Herb.

Type genus
- Lycoris L.

Genera
- Lycoris; Shoubiaonia; Ungernia

Synonyms
- Lycoreae

= Lycorideae =

Tribe of flowering plants

Lycorideae are a small tribe of subfamily Amaryllidoideae (family Amaryllidaceae). They are herbaceous monocot perennial flowering plants endemic to Asia, and consisting of three genera including the type genus, Lycoris.

== Taxonomy ==
=== Phylogeny ===
The placement of Lycorideae within subfamily Amaryllidoideae is shown in the following cladogram:

Cladogram: Tribes of subfamily Amaryllidoideae

- Subfamily Amaryllidoideae
  - Africa
    Tribe Amaryllideae
  - - - Africa
        Tribe Cyrtantheae
      - - Africa
          Tribe Haemantheae
        - Australasia
          Tribe Calostemmateae
    - - Eurasian clade
        - Asia
          Tribe Lycorideae
        - Mediterranean
          - Tribe Galantheae
          - - Tribe Pancratieae
            - Tribe Narcisseae
      - American clade
        - Hippeastroid clade
          - Tribe Griffineae
          - Tribe Hippeastreae
        - Andean clade
          - - Tribe Eustephieae
          - - Tribe Eucharideae/Stenomesseae
            - - - Tribe Clinantheae
                - Tribe Hymenocallideae

=== Subdivision ===
There are two genera:

- Lycoris
- Ungernia
- Shoubiaonia

== Bibliography ==
- Meerow, Alan W.; Snijman, Deirdre A. (2006). "The never-ending story: multigene approaches to the phylogeny of Amaryllidaceae". Aliso. 22: 355–366. doi:10.5642/aliso.20062201.29.
- Vigneron, Pascal. "Amaryllidaceae". Amaryllidaceae.org (in French). Archived from the original on 4 January 2015.
- "Amaryllidaceae: A taxonomic tool for the Amaryllidaceae of the world". eMonocot. Archived from the original on 2016-03-04.
- https://nsojournals.onlinelibrary.wiley.com/doi/abs/10.1111/njb.02703
