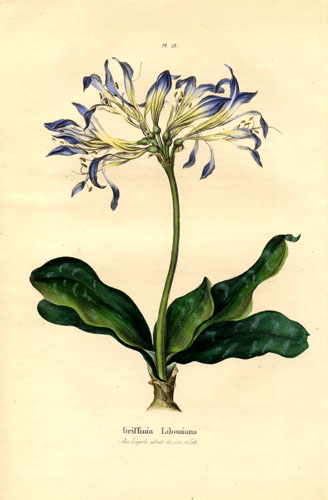
- Griffinia liboniana

Scientific classification
- Kingdom: Plantae
- Clade: Tracheophytes
- Clade: Angiosperms
- Clade: Monocots
- Order: Asparagales
- Family: Amaryllidaceae
- Subfamily: Amaryllidoideae
- Tribe: Griffineae; Ravenna

Type genus
- Griffinia Ker-Gawl.

Genera
- Griffinia Ker Gawl.; Worsleya (Traub) Traub; Cearanthes Ravenna
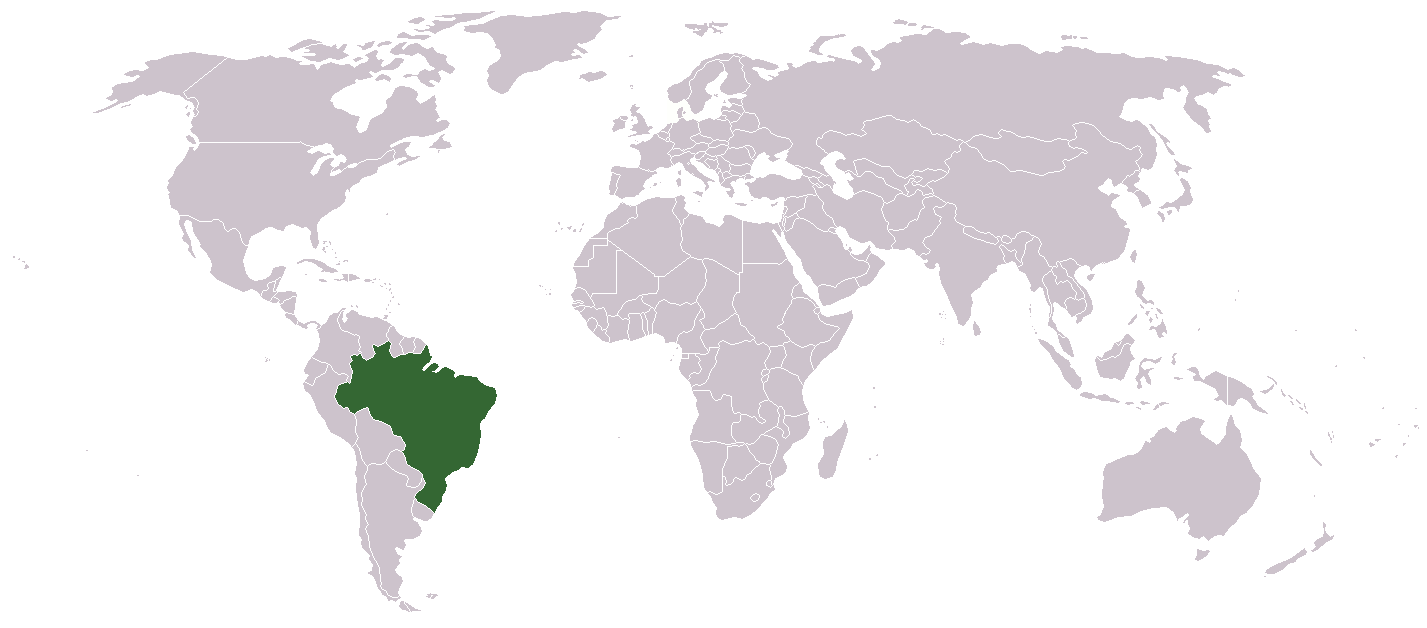
- The tribe Griffineae is endemic to Brazil

Synonyms
- Griffiniinae D. & U. M.-D.

= Griffineae =

Tribe of flowering plants

The Griffineae is a tribe in the family Amaryllidaceae, subfamily Amaryllidoideae. It includes 3 genera with 22 species endemic to Brazil in South America. A typical character of the representatives of the tribe are the flowers - They are blue or lilac and collected into an umbel. Only the members of this tribe and the genus Lycoris are able to form flowers with such color in the whole subfamily Amaryllidoideae of Amaryllidaceae. The species in this group are typically perennial and produce bulbs. The leaves are green, with elliptical form in most of the cases but in some members, as in Worsleya, they are sword-shaped.

== Taxonomy ==
The Müller-Doblies' (1996) placed Griffinia in its own subtribe Griffiniinae (of tribe Hippeastreae) and did not recognise Worsleya, which they submerged in Phycella. In contrast, Meerow and Snijman (1998) resurrected it, placing both genera within Hippeastreae. Subsequently, molecular phylogenetic studies demonstrated that Griffineae was a distinct and separate tribe. The type genus is Griffinia Ker Gawl.

=== Phylogeny ===
The placement of Griffineae within subfamily Amaryllidoideae is shown in the following cladogram, where this tribe is shown as a sister group to the Hippeastreae, forming the Hippeastroid subclade, of two American clades:

Cladogram: Tribes of subfamily Amaryllidoideae

- Subfamily Amaryllidoideae
  - Africa
    Tribe Amaryllideae
  - - - Africa
        Tribe Cyrtantheae
      - - Africa
          Tribe Haemantheae
        - Australasia
          Tribe Calostemmateae
    - - Eurasian clade
        - Asia
          Tribe Lycorideae
        - Mediterranean
          - Tribe Galantheae
          - - Tribe Pancratieae
            - Tribe Narcisseae
      - American clade
        - Hippeastroid clade
          - Tribe Griffineae
          - Tribe Hippeastreae
        - Andean clade
          - - Tribe Eustephieae
          - - Tribe Eucharideae/Stenomesseae
            - - - Tribe Clinantheae
                - Tribe Hymenocallideae

=== Subdivision ===
The tribe Griffineae includes the following three genera:

- Griffinia Ker Gawl.
- Worsleya (Traub) Traub
- Cearanthes Ravenna

== Bibliography ==
- "Amaryllidaceae: A taxonomic tool for the Amaryllidaceae of the world". eMonocot. Archived from the original on 2016-03-04.
- Kubitzki, K., ed. (1998). The Families and Genera of Vascular Plants. Vol.3; Flowering Plants. Monocotyledons. Berlin, Germany: Springer-Verlag. ISBN 978-3-540-64060-8.
- Meerow, Alan. "Towards a phylogeny of the Amaryllidaceae". In Rudall et al. (1995), pp. 169–179.
- Meerow, AW; Snijman, DA. "Amaryllidaceae". In Kubitzki (1998), pp. 83–110.. (additional excerpts)
- Meerow, Alan W.; Snijman, Deirdre A. (2006). "The never-ending story: multigene approaches to the phylogeny of Amaryllidaceae". Aliso. 22: 355–366. doi:10.5642/aliso.20062201.29.
- Müller-Doblies, U.; Müller-Doblies, D. (1996). "Tribes and subtribes and some species combinations in Amaryllidaceae J St Hil R Dahlgren & al. 1985". Feddes Repertorium. 107 (5–6): S.c.1–S.c.9.
- Rudall, P.J.; Cribb, P.J.; Cutler, D.F.; Humphries, C.J., eds. (1995). Monocotyledons: systematics and evolution (Proceedings of the International Symposium on Monocotyledons: Systematics and Evolution, Kew 1993). Kew: Royal Botanic Gardens. ISBN 978-0-947643-85-0.
- Stevens, P.F. (2001–2012). "Angiosperm Phylogeny Website: Amaryllidoideae".
- Vigneron, Pascal (2008). "Amaryllidaceae". Amaryllidaceae.org (in French). Archived from the original on 4 January 2015.
- Meerow, A.W.; Fay, M.F.; Guy, C.L.; Li, Q.-B.; Zaman, F.Q.; Chase, M.W. (1999). "Systematics of Amaryllidaceae based on cladistic analysis of plastid rbcL and trnL-F sequence data". Am. J. Bot. 86 (9): 1325–1345. doi:10.2307/2656780. JSTOR 2656780. PMID 10487820.
- Meerow, A.W.; Guy, C.L.; Li, Q.-B.; Yang, S.-L. (2000). "Phylogeny of the American Amaryllidaceae Based on nrDNA ITS Sequences". Systematic Botany. 25 (4): 708–726. doi:10.2307/2666729. JSTOR 2666729. S2CID 20392462.
