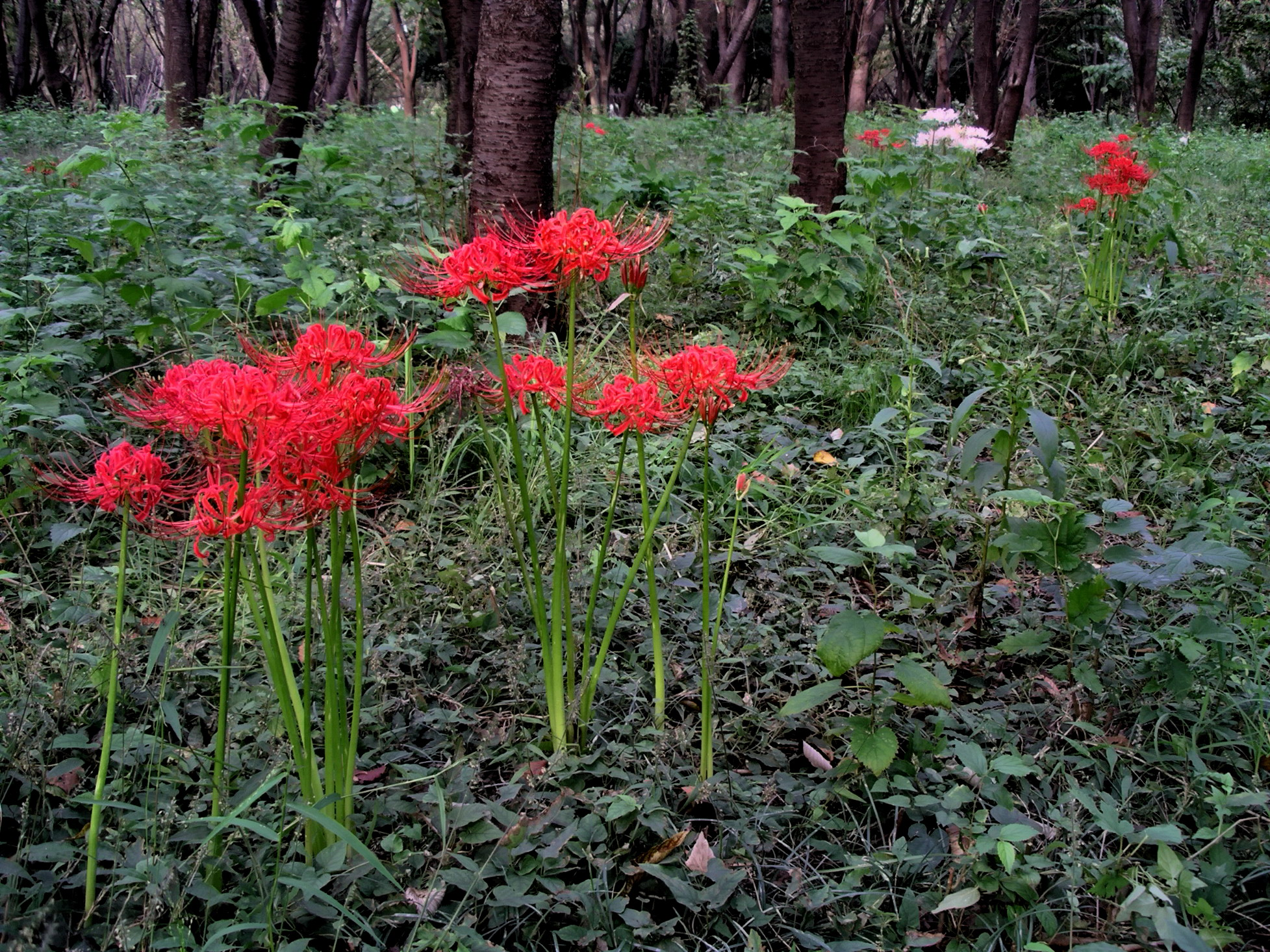

Scientific classification
- Kingdom: Plantae
- Clade: Tracheophytes
- Clade: Angiosperms
- Clade: Monocots
- Order: Asparagales
- Family: Amaryllidaceae
- Subfamily: Amaryllidoideae
- Genus: Lycoris
- Species: L. radiata

Binomial name
- Lycoris radiata (L'Hér.) Herb.

Synonyms
- Amaryllis radiata L'Hér.; Lycoris terracianii Dammann; Nerine japonica Miq.; Nerine radiata (L'Hér.) Sweet; Orexis radiata (L'Hér.) Salisb.

= Lycoris radiata =

Red spider lily

Species of plant

Lycoris radiata, known as the red spider lily, red magic lily, corpse flower, or equinox flower, is a plant in the amaryllis family, Amaryllidaceae, subfamily Amaryllidoideae. It is originally from China, Japan, Korea and Nepal and spread from there to the United States and elsewhere. It is considered naturalized in Seychelles and in the Ryukyu Islands. It flowers in the late summer or autumn, often in response to heavy rainfall. The common name hurricane lily refers to this characteristic, as do other common names, such as resurrection lily; these may be used for the genus as a whole.

== Description ==
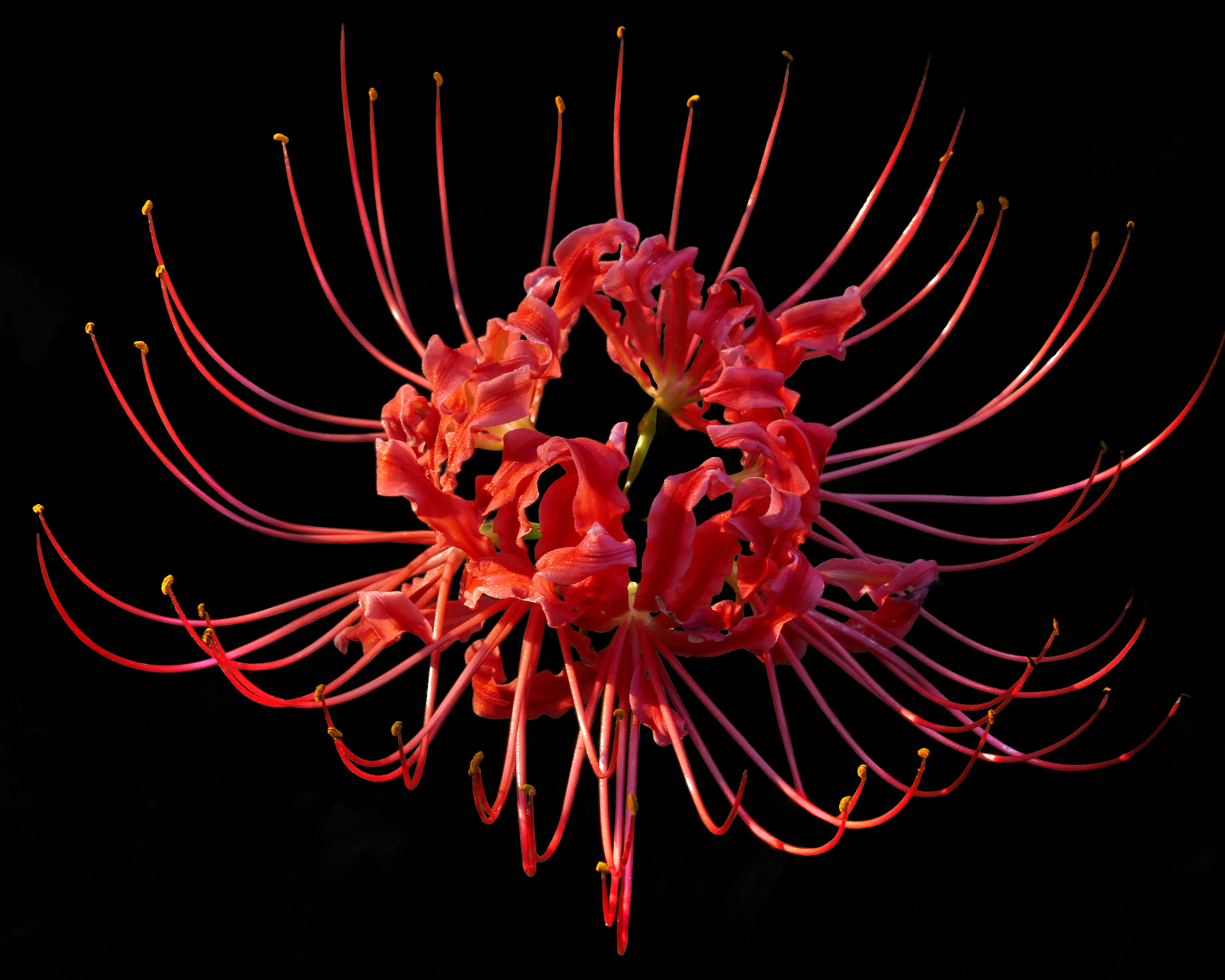
A red spider lily flower in full-bloom

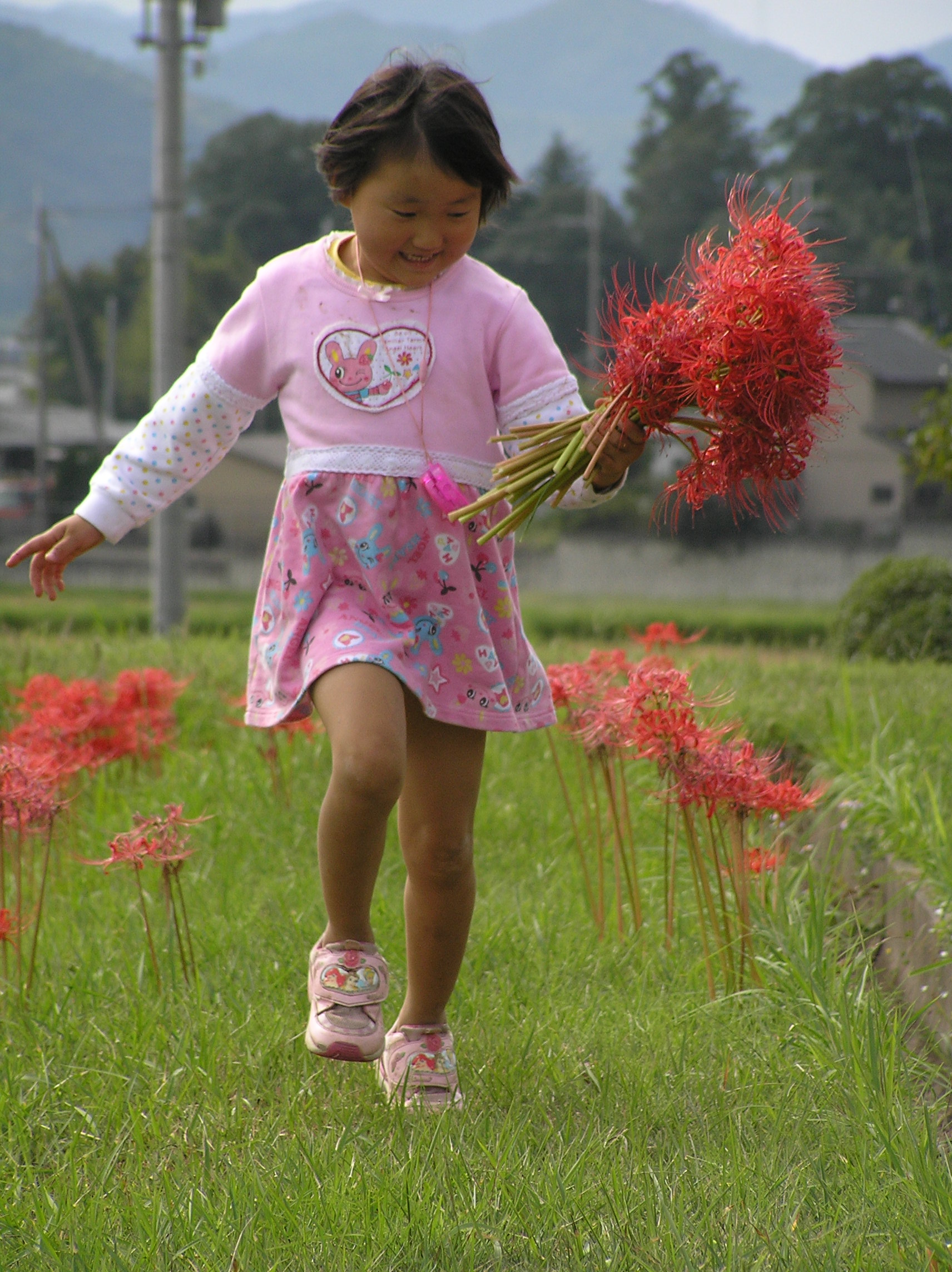
A girl with a bouquet of red spider lily flowers

Lycoris radiata is a bulbous perennial with showy, bright-red flowers. When in full bloom, spindly stamens, likened to the image of spider legs, extend slightly upward and outward from the flower's center. The flowers of the plant generally appear around late August to early September, before the leaves fully develop, on scapes rising 30–70 centimetres (12–28 in) from the ground. Four to six 2-inch long flowers, arranged in umbels, perch atop each plant stalk. Individual flowers are irregular, with narrow segments which curve backwards. The leaves, which tend to emerge in October, are a greyish-green color, parallel-sided, 0.5–1 cm (1/4–3/8 in) wide and feature a paler central stripe. The plant retains its leaves throughout the winter season, but will begin to shed them away as temperatures start to warm in late spring.

== Taxonomy ==
The presumed original form of Lycoris radiata, known as L. radiata var. pumila, occurs only in China. It is a diploid, with 11 pairs of chromosomes (2N = 22), and is able to reproduce by seed. Triploid forms, with 33 chromosomes, are known as L. radiata var. radiata. These are widespread in China and also in Japan, from where the species was introduced into cultivation in America and elsewhere. The triploid forms are sterile, and reproduce only vegetatively, via bulbs. The Japanese triploids are genetically uniform. It has been suggested that they were introduced into Japan from China along with rice cultivation.

In phylogenetic analyses based on chloroplast genes, Hori et al. found that all the other species of Lycoris they examined were nested within Lycoris radiata. They suggest that the "species" of Lycoris presently recognized may not be distinct.

== Cultivation ==
All plant species belonging to the genus Lycoris, including L. radiata, are native to East Asia. The plant was first introduced into the United States in 1854 following the signing of the Treaty of Kanagawa, a peace treaty brokered between the United States of America and Japan which effectively opened up Japanese ports for trade with the U.S. It is alleged that Captain William Roberts, a botany enthusiast and an ally of Commodore Matthew Calbraith Perry of the U.S Navy, returned to the U.S with only three bulbs of the red spider lily from this travels abroad. The bulbs were then planted by his niece who found that they did not bloom until after the first good rain in the fall season. L. radiata has since become naturalized in North Carolina, Texas, Oklahoma, and many other southern states of the US. Since the Japanese variety of L. radiata is a sterile triploid, the introduced plants were also sterile and could only reproduce via bulb division. Today, red spider lilies are appreciated as ornamental and medicinal plants in various countries all across Asia, Europe and in the United States.

Before being placed into the ground, L. radiata bulbs should be stored in a dry environment between 7–13 °C (45–55 °F). The bulbs are ideally planted during the spring in rich, well-drained soil (e.g. sandy with some clay), 20 cm (8 in) deep and 15–30 cm (6–12 in) apart from one another. When possible L. radiata ought to be placed in plots that either receive ample sunlight or are partially shaded. Once planted, the bulbs are best left undisturbed. Lycoris radiata is not frost-hardy in countries like England, and so can only be grown under glass or in a very sheltered environment. In warm-summer climates such as the U.S. east of the Rocky Mountains, where there is sufficient summer heat to harden off the bulbs, the plants are hardy to around −18 °C (0 °F). Like other plants in the genus Lycoris, L. radiata remains dormant during the summer season, flowering on leafless scapes once the summer begins to transition into the fall. Red spider lilies are sometimes referred to as magic lilies because it is said that the radiant red flowers appear to bloom "magically" from their unremarkably bare stalks. Furthermore, in the environments in which they are commonly grown, L. radiata tend to bloom in step with the coming of the rainy season, and or the coming of the hurricane season, as well as the fall equinox. As such, spider lilies are also known as hurricane lilies or equinox lilies.

== Toxicity and medicinal applications ==
Like all members of the genus Lycoris, the bulbs of Lycoris radiata are poisonous, mostly due to the presence of the toxic alkaloid lycorine. If ingested, bulbs can cause diarrhea, vomiting, convulsions, and - in severe cases - even death.

L. radiata plants also contain the alkaloid galantamine, which has been approved by the United States Food and Drug Administration (USDA) for the treatment of Alzheimer's disease. The plant is cultivated in China for galantamine extraction. Plants of the amaryllis family are all known to contain varying quantities of naturally occurring galantamine, and the compound can be extracted in trace amounts from the leaves and roots of L. radiata, but is most abundant within the bulbs. L. radiata has also shown promise in preliminary studies of cytotoxic effects on cancer cells, though further research is required.

== In East Asian culture ==
=== Japan ===
The Japanese common name for Lycoris radiata, higanbana (ヒガンバナ; 彼岸花), literally means "flower of higan (Buddhist holiday around the autumnal equinox, which itself literally means "the other shore", or "the distant shore".)" Another popular Japanese name is manjushage (曼珠沙華) (or manjushake,) taken from the name of a mythical flower described in Chinese translation of the Lotus Sutra. It is called by over 50 other local names in Japan. The Lycoris radiata first came to Japan from China around 700 A.D. The flower has since become a cultural symbol, representing the arrival of fall. Red spider lilies are frequently seen in Japan growing along roadways and around the perimeters of rice fields and houses. The lilies are purposefully planted near rice fields in order to deter mice and other animals from invading the rice paddies; the poisonous bulbs are thought to keep the unwanted critters away.

The most common Japanese name, higanbana (彼岸花), means "the flower of the higan". The term higan (彼岸) itself means "the other shore" or "the distant shore". Originally in Buddhist teachings, this term (pāram) describes "Nirvana on the other shore" after one has traversed and overcome the turbulent currents of worldly desires. However, in popular Japanese culture, this term has been taken to simply mean "the other side of the Sanzu River (三途川, which is the Japanese equivalent of the Styx, the realm of the dead), also pointing to the Buddhist concept of heavenly paradise ("gokuraku jyōdo" / 極楽浄土) where the good souls reside in afterlife. Consequently, this term has a heavy connotation to death and afterlife. In accordance with established traditions, many practitioners of Buddhism in Japan will celebrate the arrival of fall with a ceremony during the autumn higan festival, at the tombs of their ancestors. In order to pay tribute to the dead, red spider lilies, which blooms around this time, are commonly planted on and around grave sites as a part of this ceremonial practice. Japanese people also often use these flowers in funerals. Because of these superstitions and negative connotations, there is a belief in Japan that one should never gift a bouquet of these flowers. Japanese Buddhists attribute the "Lycoris radiata" with the "manjushake" (from Sanskrit's Manjusaka, described in the Lotus Sutra as ominous flowers that grow in Hell, and guide the dead into the next reincarnation); although this usage is more limited in the general society. As such, in Japan, Lycoris radiata, most commonly in the name of higanbana, often appears in Japanese literary works, anime and mangas with connotations symbolizing death, hell, and afterlife. Less commonly, when they appear in these works as the Buddhist Manjushake, they are used with connotations symbolizing purity and reincarnation.

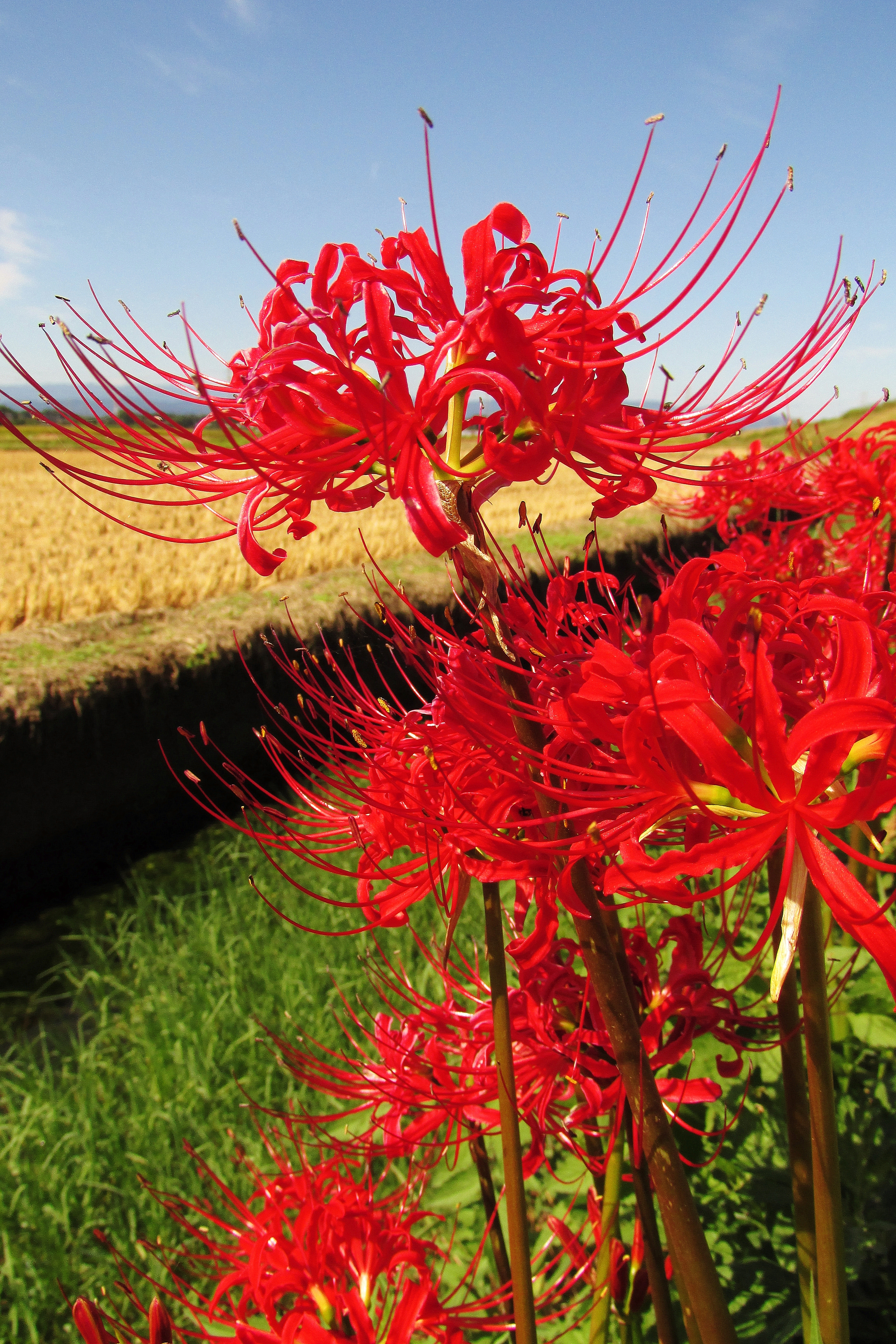
Clusters of red spider lilies grow in a rural area with autumn rice ears in the background (Saitama Prefecture, Japan)

=== Korea ===
In Korean culture, the Lycoris Radiata is called "상사화" (Sangsahwa), meaning "the flower of unrealized love". It has a connotation of "eternal separation". This is believed to originate from its characteristic that its flower only grow in autumn after all the leaves fall, and its leaves only grow after the flower withers in winter; the two never appearing at the same time.

=== China, Taiwan, Hong Kong ===
Although the flower originated in China before it spread to the rest of Asia, it has not achieved wide ranged cultural connotation of its own in the Chinese speaking societies. The Chinese common name for "Lycoris radiata" is simply "stone garlic" (石蒜). Some say that the Lycoris radiata is an auspicious symbol that represents beauty in the Chinese connotation. However, in recent years, with the popularity of Japanese anime and Korean drama influences in the Chinese societies, the flower has largely taken on the Japanese connotation with death and afterlife, and the Korean connotation of unrealized love.
