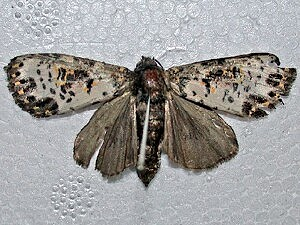
- Xanthopastis timais

Scientific classification
- Kingdom: Animalia
- Phylum: Arthropoda
- Clade: Pancrustacea
- Class: Insecta
- Order: Lepidoptera
- Superfamily: Noctuoidea
- Family: Noctuidae
- Tribe: Glottulini
- Genus: Xanthopastis; Hübner, 1821

Synonyms
- Euthisanotia; Philochrysa

= Xanthopastis =

Genus of moths

Xanthopastis is a genus of moths of the family Noctuidae.

== Species ==
- Xanthopastis moctezuma Dyar, 1913
- Xanthopastis regnatrix (Grote, 1863)
- Xanthopastis timais (Cramer, [1780])
