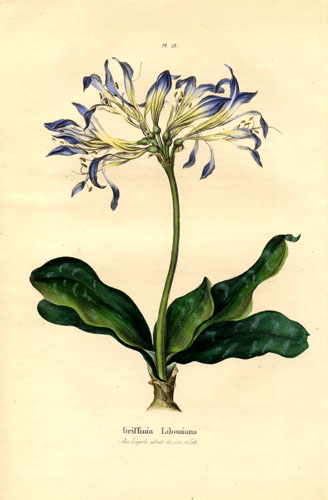
- Griffinia liboniana

Scientific classification
- Kingdom: Plantae
- Clade: Tracheophytes
- Clade: Angiosperms
- Clade: Monocots
- Order: Asparagales
- Family: Amaryllidaceae
- Subfamily: Amaryllidoideae
- Tribe: Griffineae
- Genus: Griffinia; Ker-Gawl.

Type species
- Griffinia hyacinthina (Ker Gawl.) Ker Gawl.
- Griffinia is endemic to Brazil

Synonyms
- Hyline Herb.; Libonia Lem.

= Griffinia =

Genus of flowering plants

Griffinia is a genus of Brazilian plants in the Amaryllis family, subfamily Amaryllidoideae. It includes 23 known species which are endemic to Brazil. The most closely related genus to it is the monotypic Worsleya.

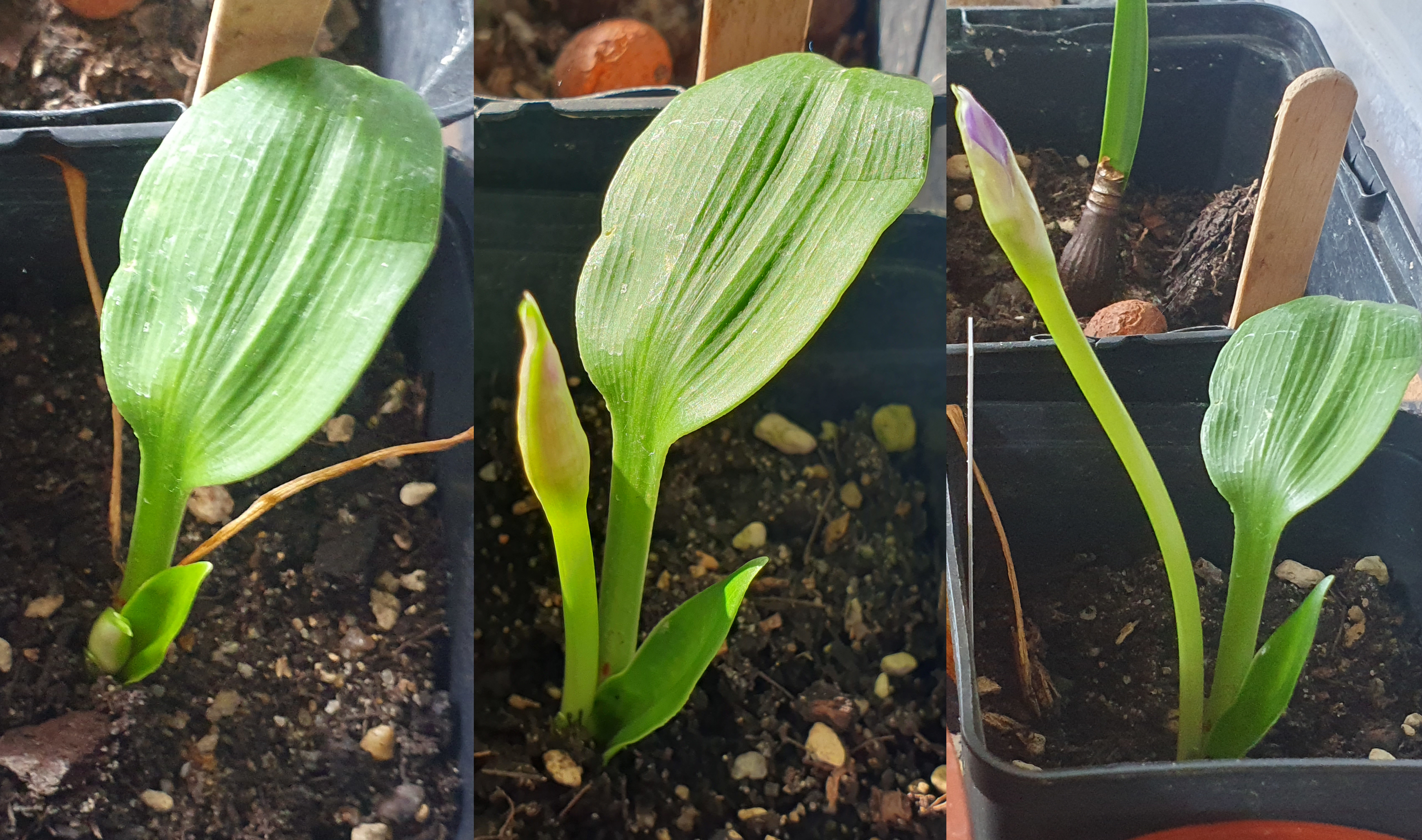
Development of inflorescence of Griffinia espiritensis var. ituberae

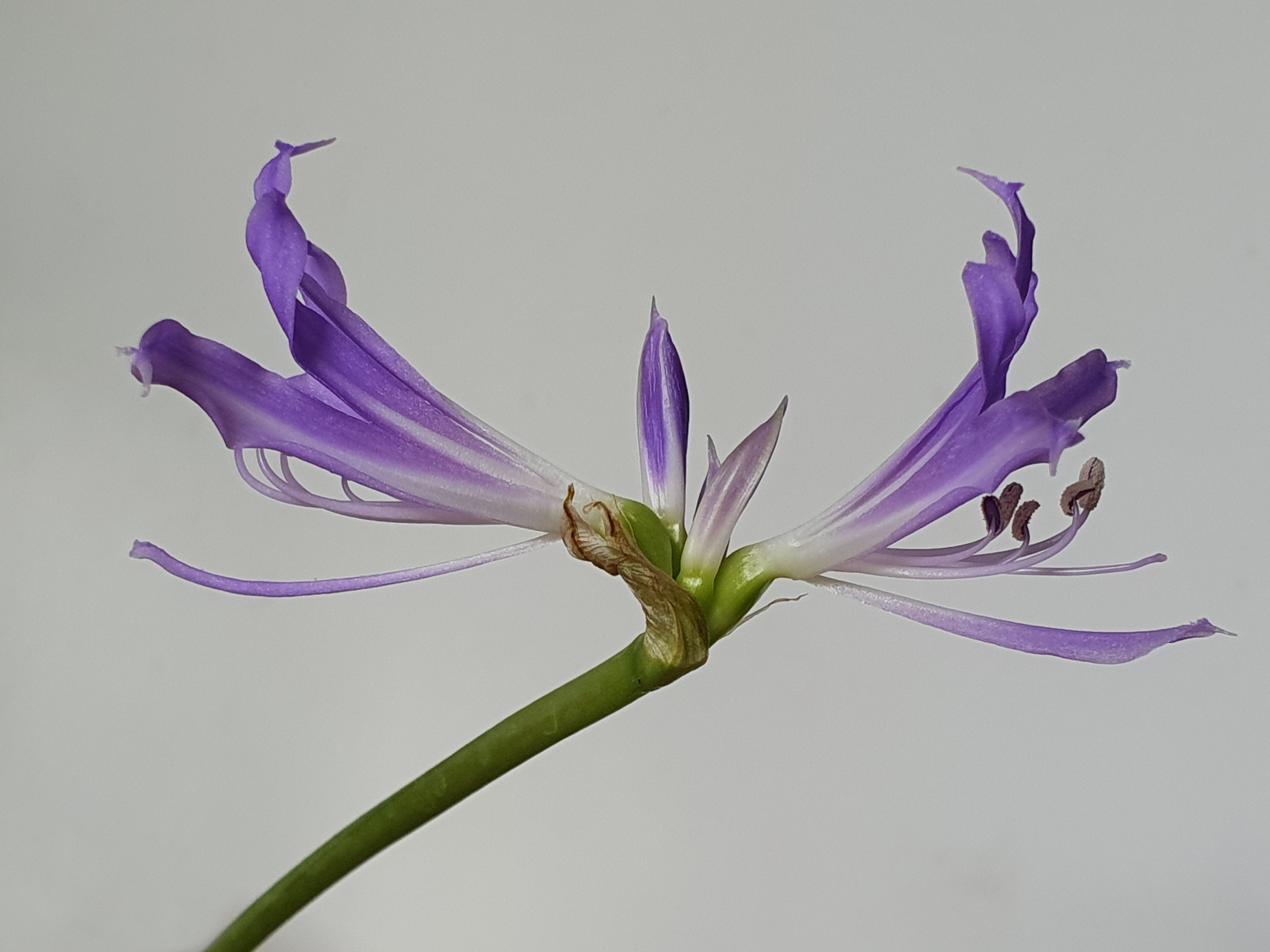
Lateral view of inflorescence of Griffinia espiritensis var. ituberae

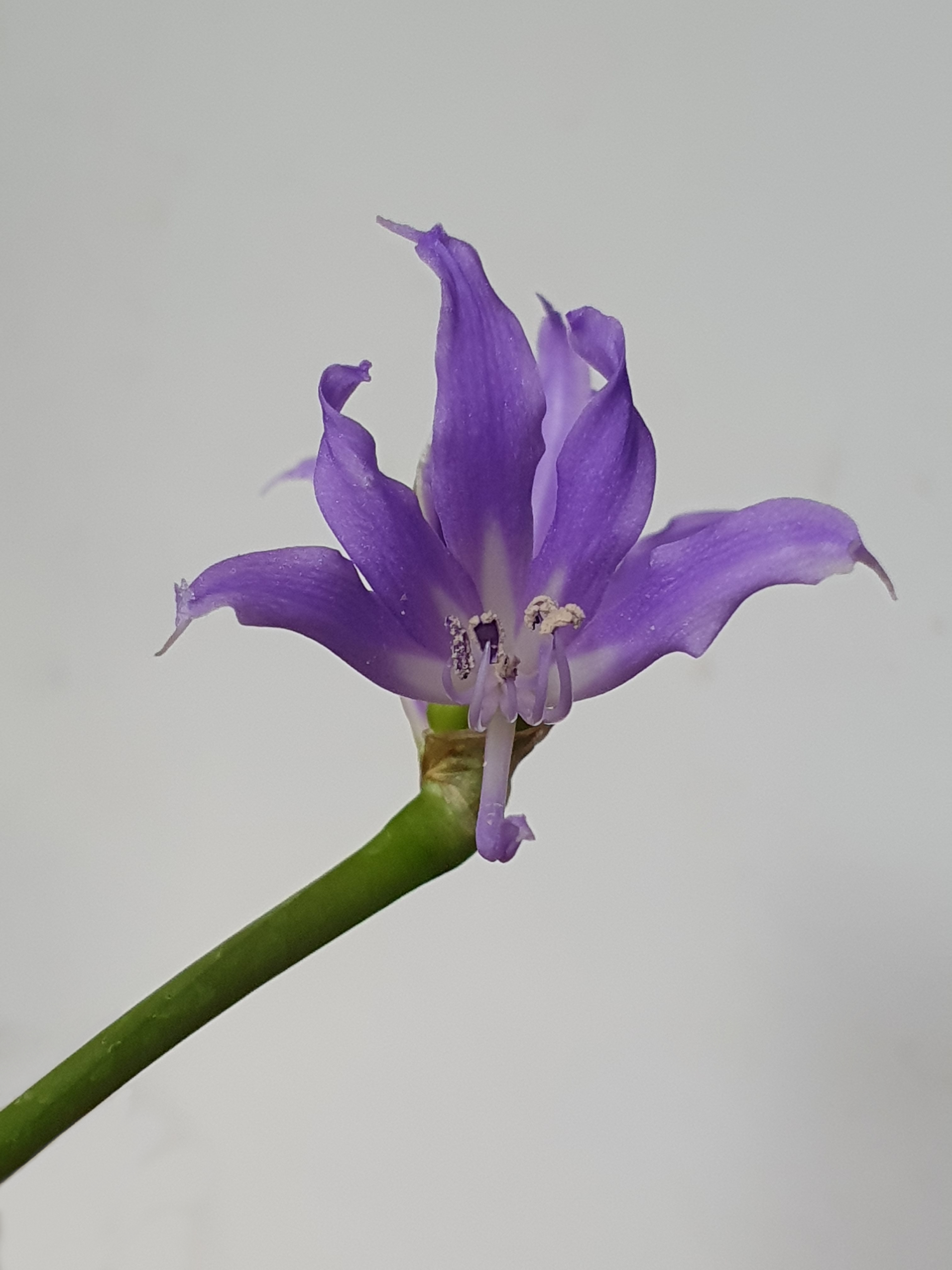
Detail of flower of Griffinia espiritensis var. ituberae

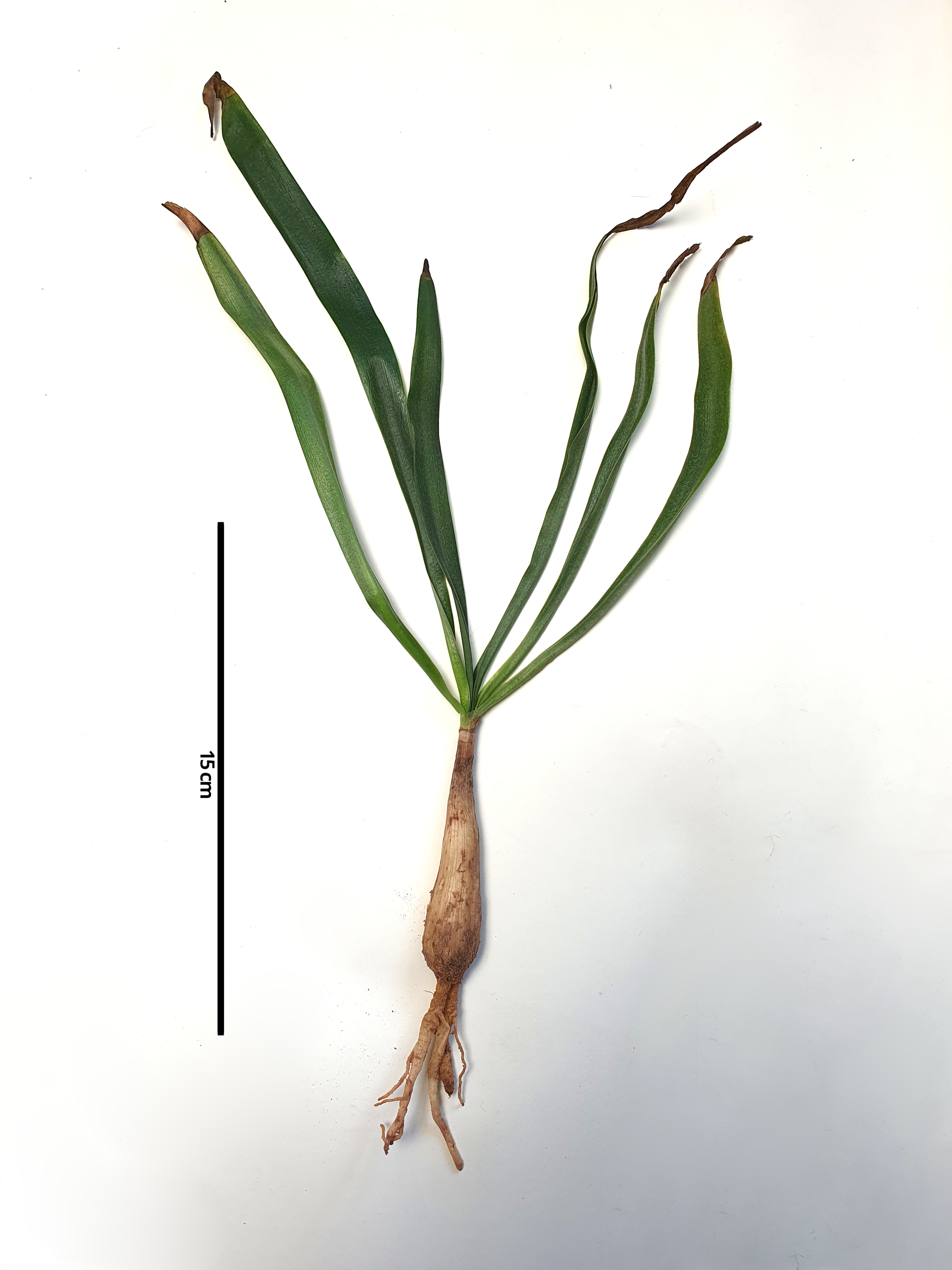
Immature bulb of Griffinia gardneriana

The members of the genus Griffinia are tropical, bulbous plants which grow in high levels of humidity. The leaves are green, petiolate, elliptical, sometimes with white speckles on them. The flowers are typical for the tribe - lilac or blue colored (although there are also white - colored species) and collected into an umbel. Many of the members in this genus are endangered because of the deforestation of their habitat.

== Taxonomy ==
Griffinia Ker Gawl. was published by John Bellenden Ker in 1820 with Griffinia hyacinthina (Ker Gawl.) Ker Gawl. as the type species. The genus Hyline Herb. published by William Herbert in 1840 is now a synonym of Griffinia Ker Gawl., but it was retained on the subgeneric level as the subgenus Griffinia subg. Hyline Rav. published by Pedro Felix Ravenna in 1969. The genus Libonia Lem. published by Charles Antoine Lemaire in 1852 is a synonym of Griffinia Ker Gawl.

=== Subgenera ===
The genus Griffinia is divided into Griffinia subg. Hyline Ravenna, in which only Griffinia gardneriana (Herb.) Ravenna and Griffinia nocturna Ravenna are placed, as well as the autonymous subgenus Griffinia subg. Griffinia, which includes all other species.

=== Species ===
As of June 2023, the genus comprises 23 species:

- Griffinia alba K.D.Preuss & Meerow
- Griffinia albolineata Campos-Rocha
- Griffinia angustifolia Campos-Rocha, Dutilh & Semir
- Griffinia aracensis Ravenna
- Griffinia arifolia Ravenna
- Griffinia capixabae Campos-Rocha & Dutilh
- Griffinia colatinensis Ravenna
- Griffinia concinna (Mart. ex Schult. & Schult.f.) Ravenna
- Griffinia espiritensis Ravenna
- Griffinia gardneriana (Herb.) Ravenna
- Griffinia hyacinthina (Ker Gawl.) Ker Gawl.
- Griffinia ilheusiana Ravenna
- Griffinia intermedia Lindl.
- Griffinia itambensis Ravenna
- Griffinia liboniana É.Morren
- Griffinia meerowiana Campos-Rocha & M.Peixoto
- Griffinia mucurina Ravenna
- Griffinia nocturna Ravenna
- Griffinia ornata T.Moore
- Griffinia parviflora Ker Gawl.
- Griffinia paubrasilica Ravenna
- Griffinia rochae G.M.Morel
- Griffinia rostrata Ravenna

Several unplaced names exist:

- Hyline itaobina Ravenna was published by Pedro Felix Ravenna in 2003.
- Hyline paraensis Ravenna was published by Pedro Felix Ravenna in 2003.

== Conservation ==
Griffinia intermedia is categorized as endangered (EN) by the IUCN Red List of Threatened Species. It is only known from two locations, in which the species, as well as its habitat is continually declining. An initiative has been taken to replicate the fragrance of Griffinia gardneriana, which is threatened with extinction, for the creation of a perfume. The sale of the perfume is meant to financially contribute to the conservation effort for this species.
