= Shoubiaonia =

Scientific classification
- Kingdom: Plantae
- Clade: Tracheophytes
- Clade: Angiosperms
- Clade: Monocots
- Order: Asparagales
- Family: Amaryllidaceae
- Subfamily: Amaryllidoideae
- Tribe: Lycorideae
- Genus: Shoubiaonia; W.H.Qin, W.Q.Meng & Kun Liu
- Species: S. yunnanensis

Binomial name
- Shoubiaonia yunnanensis W.H.Qin, W.Q.Meng & Kun Liu

Genus of flowering plants

Shoubiaonia is a monotypic genus of flowering plants in the family Amaryllidaceae. It includes a single species, Shoubiaonia yunnanensis, which is endemic to Yunnan province in south-central China.
