= Cearanthes =

Scientific classification
- Kingdom: Plantae
- Clade: Tracheophytes
- Clade: Angiosperms
- Clade: Monocots
- Order: Asparagales
- Family: Amaryllidaceae
- Subfamily: Amaryllidoideae
- Tribe: Griffineae
- Genus: Cearanthes; Ravenna
- Species: C. fuscoviolacea

Binomial name
- Cearanthes fuscoviolacea Ravenna
- Cearanthes fuscoviolacea is endemic to Northeast Brazil

Genus of flowering plants

Cearanthes is a monotypic genus of flowering plants belonging to the family Amaryllidaceae. The only species in this genus is Cearanthes fuscoviolacea Ravenna, which is endemic to Northeastern Brazil.

== Description ==
=== Vegetative characteristics ===
Cearanthes fuscoviolacea is a terrestrial herb with 3-4.5 cm long bulbs.

=== Generative characteristics ===
The androecium consists of 6 stamens.

== Taxonomy ==
=== Publication ===
The genus Cearanthes Ravenna, as well as its sole species Cearanthes fuscoviolacea Ravenna, was first published by Pierfelice Ravenna in 2000.

=== Tribe ===
Cearanthes is included in the tribe Griffineae.

== Etymology ==
The generic name Cearanthes means "flower of Ceará". The specific epithet fuscoviolacea, from the Latin fuscus meaning dark, and violaceus meaning violet, means dark purple. It refers to the floral colouration.

== Conservation ==
It is an endangered species.
