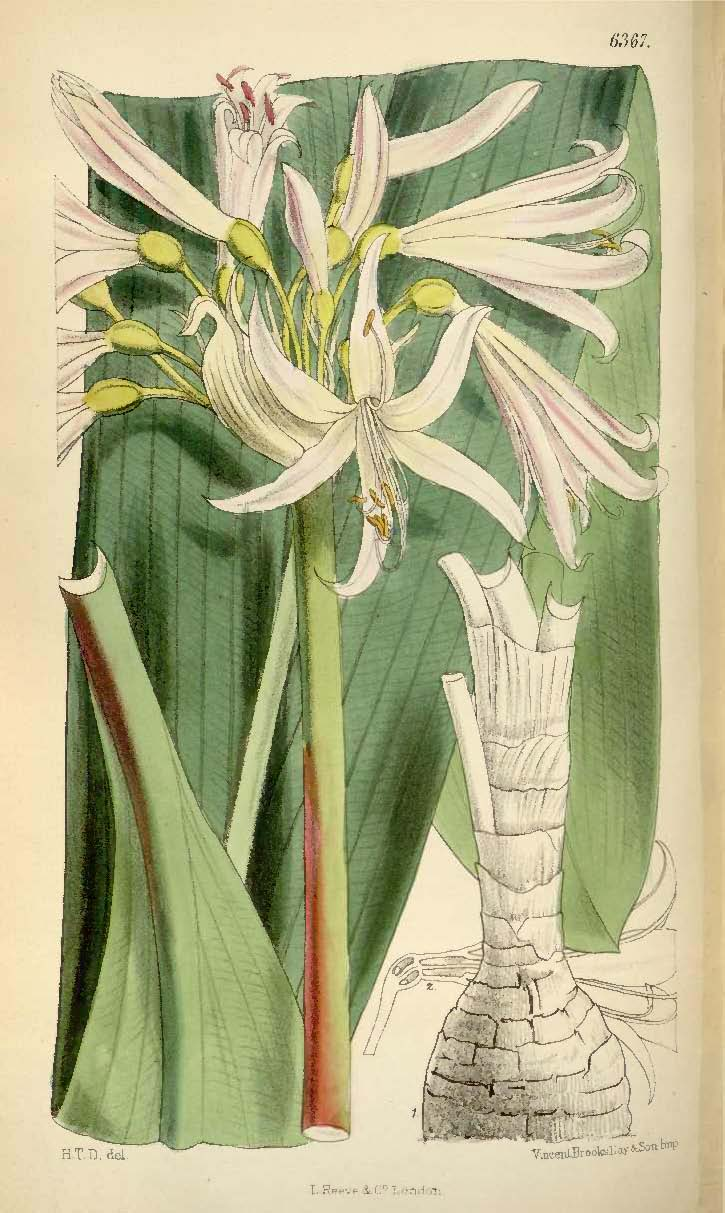
- Botanical illustration of Griffinia ornata

Scientific classification
- Kingdom: Plantae
- Clade: Tracheophytes
- Clade: Angiosperms
- Clade: Monocots
- Order: Asparagales
- Family: Amaryllidaceae
- Subfamily: Amaryllidoideae
- Genus: Griffinia
- Species: G. ornata

Binomial name
- Griffinia ornata T.Moore
- Griffinia ornata is endemic to Brazil

= Griffinia ornata =

Species of flowering plant

Griffinia ornata is a species of flowering plant in the family Amaryllidaceae. It is a bulbous plant that is endemic to southeast Brazil.

== Description ==
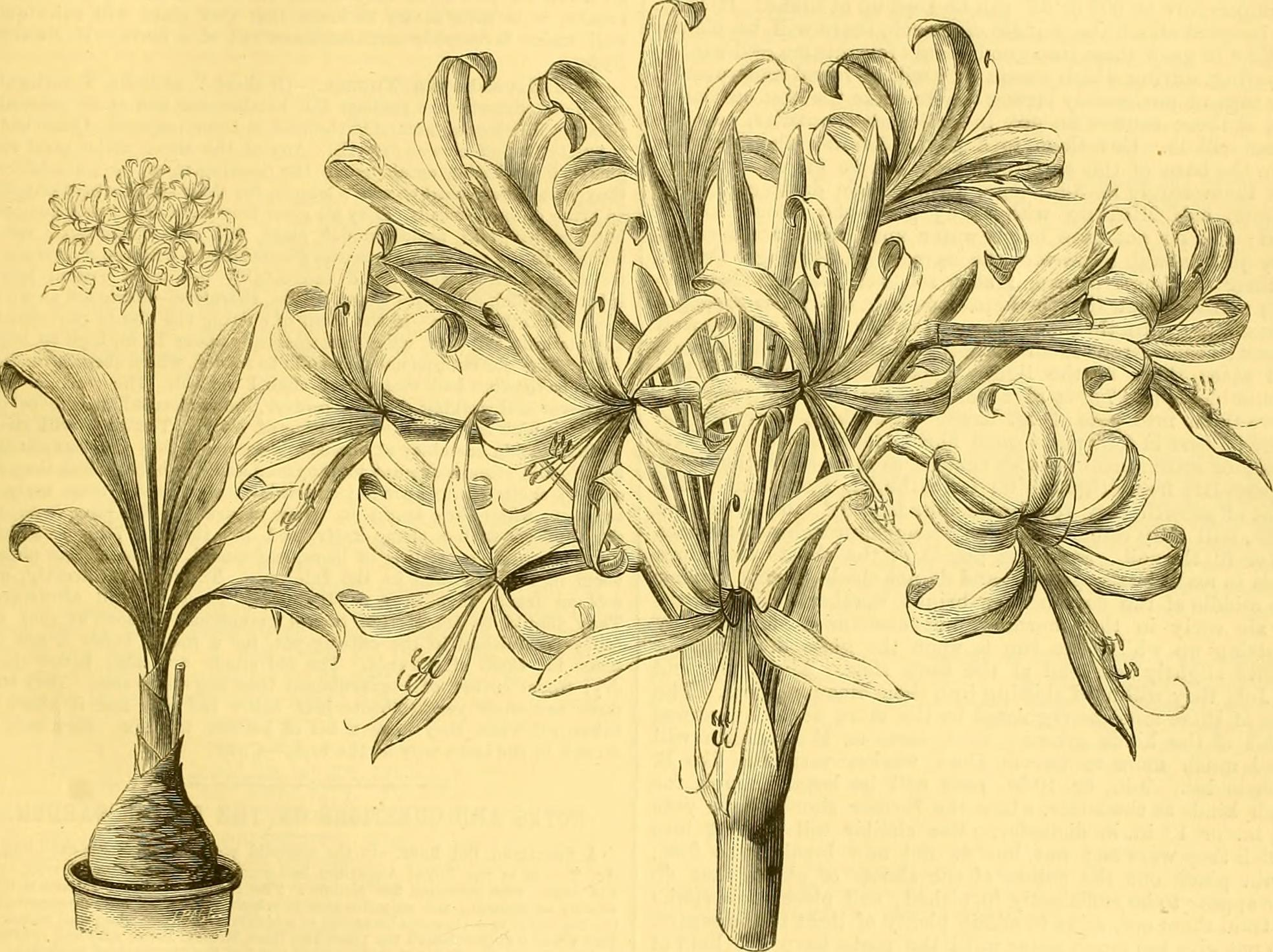
Botanical illustration of Griffinia ornata

=== Vegetative characteristics ===
Griffinia ornata is a bulbous, up to 1 m tall plant with ovate, 7–10 cm wide bulbs bearing 6–8 elliptic-oblong leaves, which are among the largest leaves of its genus.

=== Generative characteristics ===
The 18–24 pedicellate, white to lilac flowers are produced on 30–45 cm tall scapes. The inflorescence is 20–23 cm wide.

== Taxonomy ==
It was published by Thomas Moore in 1876. One source regards it as a synonym of Griffinia intermedia Lindl.

=== Etymology ===
The specific epithet ornata, from the Latin adjective ornatus, means ornate, decorated, or beautiful.

== Conservation ==
It is a rare species threatened with extinction.

== Ecology ==
=== Habitat ===
It occurs in lowland forests.

=== Herbivory ===
The larvae of the moth species Xanthopastis timais feeds on Griffinia ornata.
