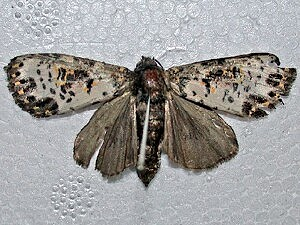

Scientific classification
- Kingdom: Animalia
- Phylum: Arthropoda
- Clade: Pancrustacea
- Class: Insecta
- Order: Lepidoptera
- Superfamily: Noctuoidea
- Family: Noctuidae
- Genus: Xanthopastis
- Species: X. timais

Binomial name
- Xanthopastis timais (Cramer, 1780)

Synonyms
- Phalaena timais Cramer, [1780]; Phalaena Noctua timais Cramer, [1780]; Glottula timais; Euthisanotia timais; Phalaena amaryllidis Sepp, [1840]; Glottula heterocampa Guenée, 1852; Philochrysa regnatrix Grote, [1864]; Xanthopastis antillium Dyar, 1913; Xanthopastis timias f. molinoi Dyar, 1919

= Xanthopastis timais =

Species of moth

Xanthopastis timais is a moth of the family Noctuidae. It is found throughout the lowland areas of South and Central America and in the Caribbean. In the south, it ranges to northern Argentina. It was previously also recorded from North America, but these records refer to Xanthopastis regnatrix.

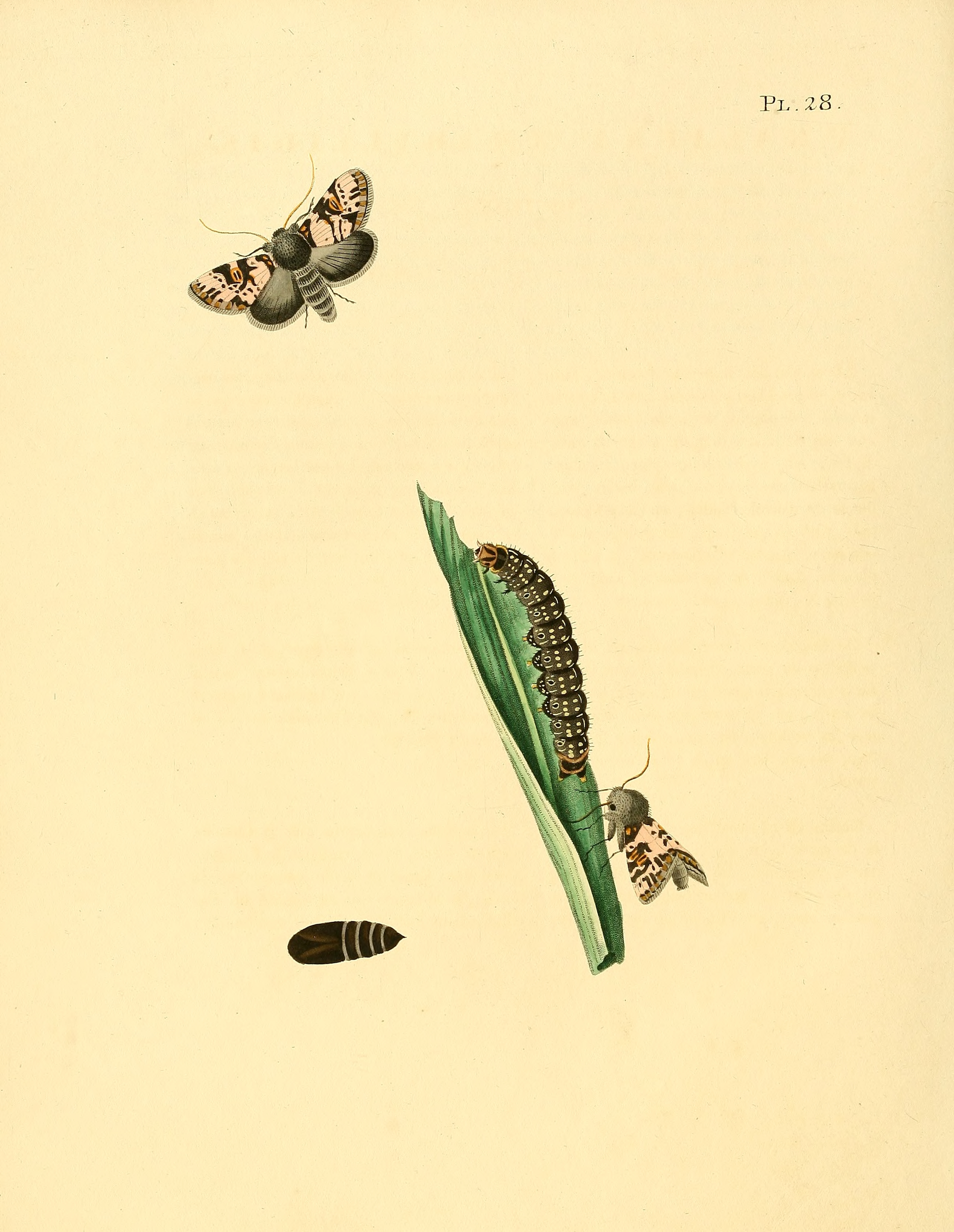
Illustration from Sepp’s Surinaamsche vlinders

== Ecology ==
=== Herbivory ===
The larvae of Xanthopastis timais feeds on Griffinia ornata.
