= Higan =

Buddhist holiday exclusively during both the Spring and Autumnal Equinox

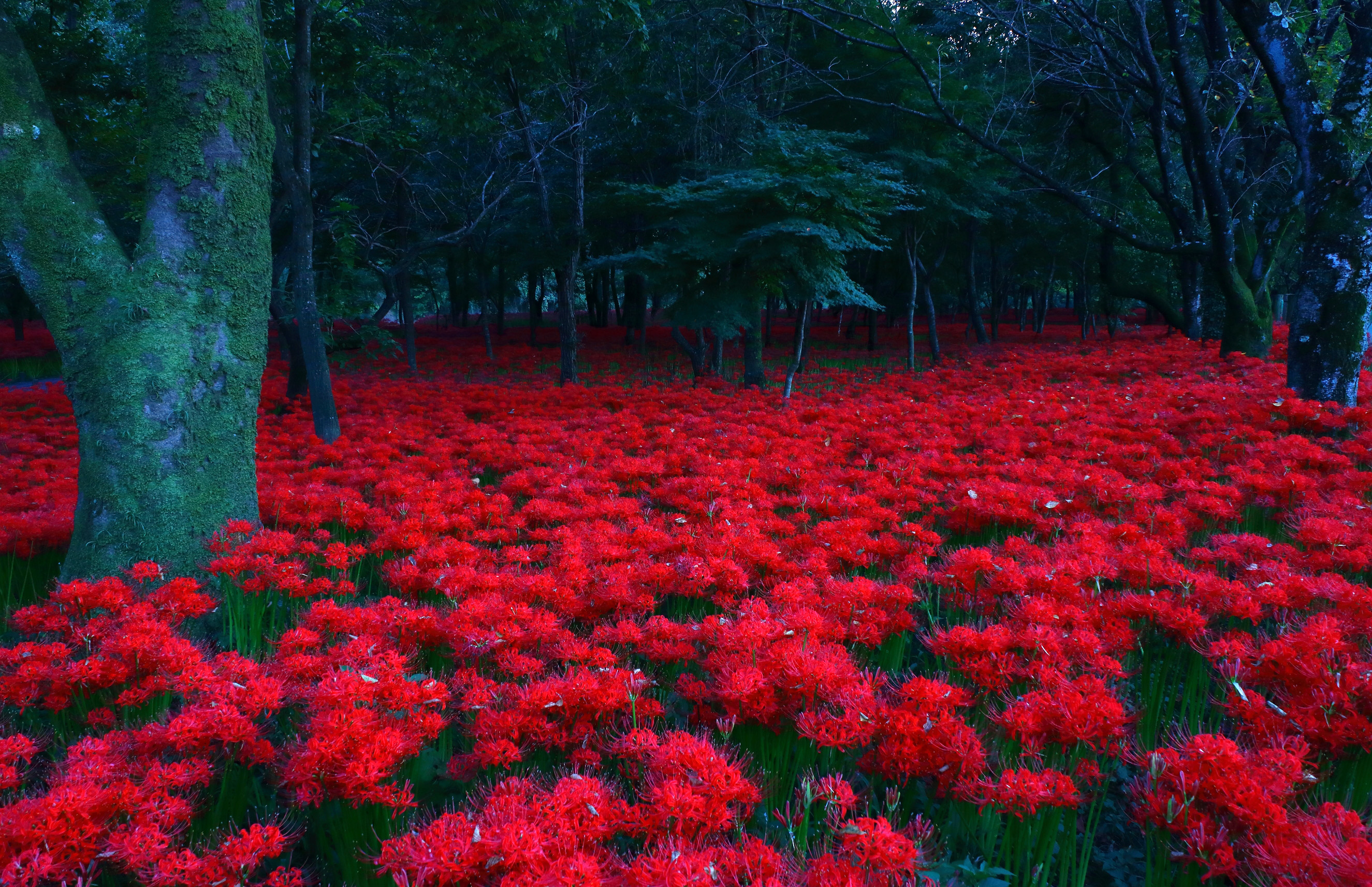
In Japan the red spider lily signals shūbun, the arrival of fall. Many Buddhists will use it to celebrate the arrival of fall with a ceremony at the tomb of one of their ancestors.

Higan (彼岸; lit. "distant shore") is a Buddhist holiday exclusively celebrated by Japanese sects for seven days; three days before and after both the Spring equinox (shunbun) and Autumnal equinox (shūbun). It is observed by nearly every Buddhist school in Japan. The tradition extends from mild weather that occurs during the time of equinoxes, though the origin of the holiday dates from Emperor Shōmu in the 8th century. People who normally worked in the fields had more leisure time to evaluate their own practices, and to make a renewed effort to follow Buddhism. The seasons beginning to change is a symbol that Buddhists should change their lives in order to reach enlightenment. Today, special services are usually observed in Japanese Buddhist temples, and Japanese temples abroad, based on the particular Buddhist tradition or sect.

== Origin ==
Higan is the Japanese pronunciation of the Chinese translation of the Sanskrit term for "the Other Shore". The cycle of death and rebirth (saṃsāra) is "this shore", and in Buddhism, crossing to the other shore is used to refer to the attainment of nirvana.

In Pure Land Buddhism, the Pure Land of Amida Buddha is seen as being located in the west, and the length of day and night are the same twice a year at the vernal and autumnal equinoxes, when the sun rises due east and sets due west. The sun rises in the true East and sets in the true West during the Spring and Autumn Equinoxes, when the length of day and night are the same twice a year, so practitioners would revere the sun setting in the West and ponder the far-off Pure Land. It has been said that the gate to the other world opens during the equinoxes, when day and night, East and West, are parallel. Nowadays, Higan is often explained as a Buddhist event in this way. Eventually, the purpose of the event changed to that of an ancestor memorial service, and it became firmly established.

However, since Higan is uniquely Japanese and not found in Indian or Chinese Buddhism, folklorists estimate that it may have originally originated in ancient Japanese folk beliefs in the sun and ancestral spirits. Shigeru Gorai states that the word Higan, a word from the sun worship to pray to the sun for a good harvest, was later combined with Buddhism. He points out that the combination of folk customs, the name of Higan, and its timing became a Buddhist event, and became a major part of daily life as a seasonal custom.

== History ==
In the 25th year of the Enryaku era (806), the first Buddhist Higan-e ceremony was held in Japan. In an entry from the 17th day of the 3rd month of that year in the Nihon Kōki, it is written that "every year, for seven days around the spring and autumn equinoxes, the 'Kongo Hannya Paramita Sutra' was recited for Prince Sawara to appease his grudge." On that day, the Great Council of State of the Imperial Court issued an order to have monks of the provincial temples in the "Five Kinai and Seven Provinces" recite the Kongo Hannya Paramita Sutra for seven days around the spring and autumn equinoxes . The document that issued this order made it a regular event, which later became the Higan-e ceremony. In the first year of the Bun'o era (1260), Emperor Kameyama banned killing on the six austerity days and during the Spring and Autumn Equinoxes.

== Ancestral veneration ==
Similar to Obon, Japanese citizens will often return to their hometowns during the holiday season to pay respects to their ancestors. Ohigan is a public holiday, thus many businesses are closed.

== See also ==
- Lycoris radiata (Red spider lily) - In Japanese, higan-bana (higan-flower)
