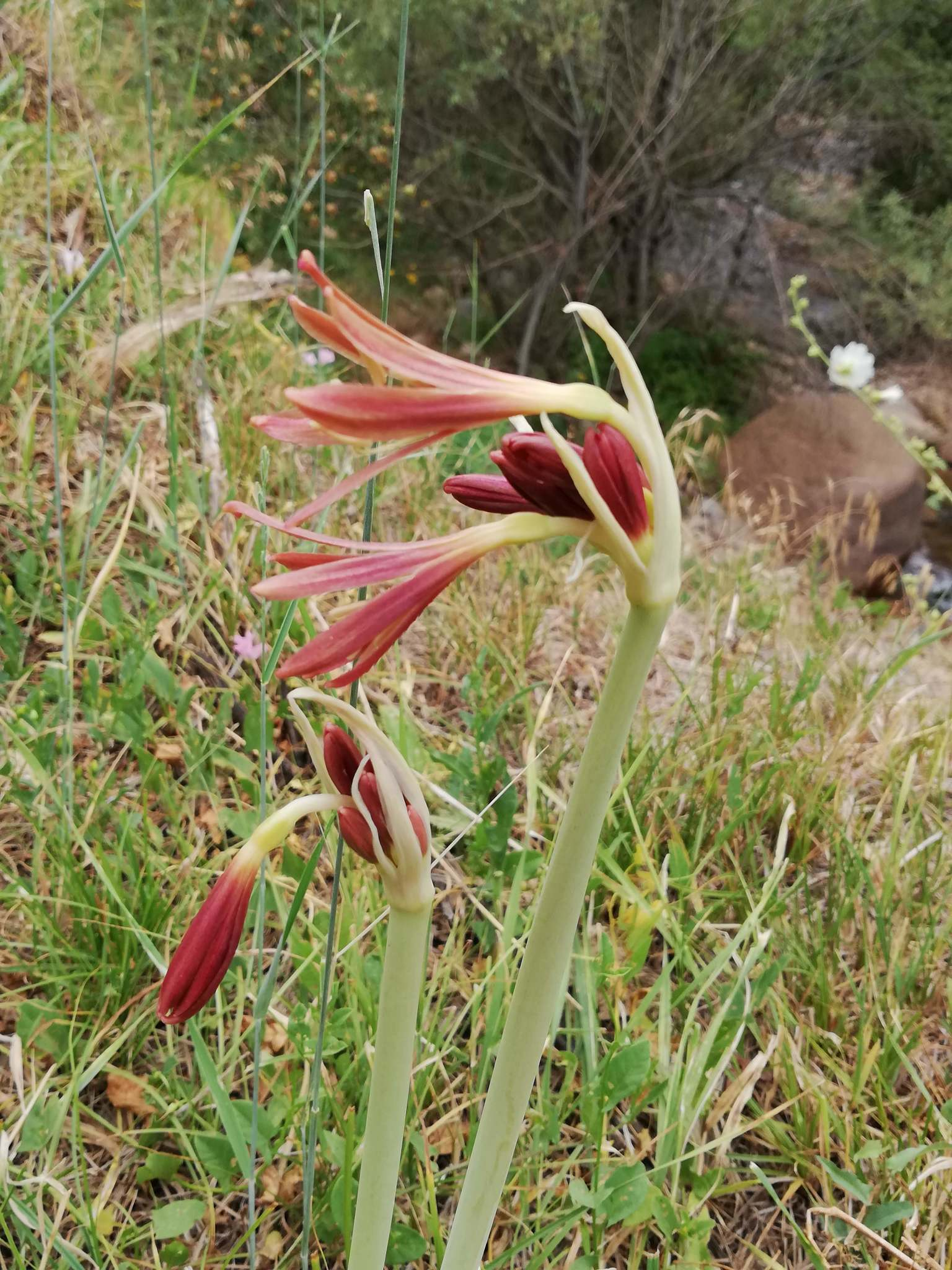
- Ungernia sewerzowii

Scientific classification
- Kingdom: Plantae
- Clade: Tracheophytes
- Clade: Angiosperms
- Clade: Monocots
- Order: Asparagales
- Family: Amaryllidaceae
- Subfamily: Amaryllidoideae
- Tribe: Lycorideae
- Genus: Ungernia; Bunge

Type species
- Ungernia trisphaera Bunge

= Ungernia =

Genus of flowering plants

Ungernia is a genus of bulb-forming plants in the Amaryllis family, native to central and south-central Asia Asia (Iran, Afghanistan, Kazakhstan, Uzbekistan, Turkmenistan, Kyrgyzstan, and Tajikistan).

Species

- Ungernia badghysi Botsch. - Turkmenistan
- Ungernia ferganica Vved. ex Artjush. - Kyrgyzstan
- Ungernia flava Boiss. & Hausskn. - Iran
- Ungernia oligostroma Popov & Vved. - Uzbekistan, Kyrgyzstan, Tajikistan
- Ungernia sewerzowii (Regel) B.Fedtsch. - Kazakhstan, Uzbekistan, Kyrgyzstan
- Ungernia spiralis Proskor. - Turkmenistan
- Ungernia tadschicorum Vved. ex Artjushenko - Tajikistan
- Ungernia trisphaera Bunge - Iran, Afghanistan, Turkmenistan
- Ungernia victoris Vved. ex Artjush. - Kyrgyzstan, Tajikistan
- Ungernia vvedenskyi Khamidch. - Kazakhstan
