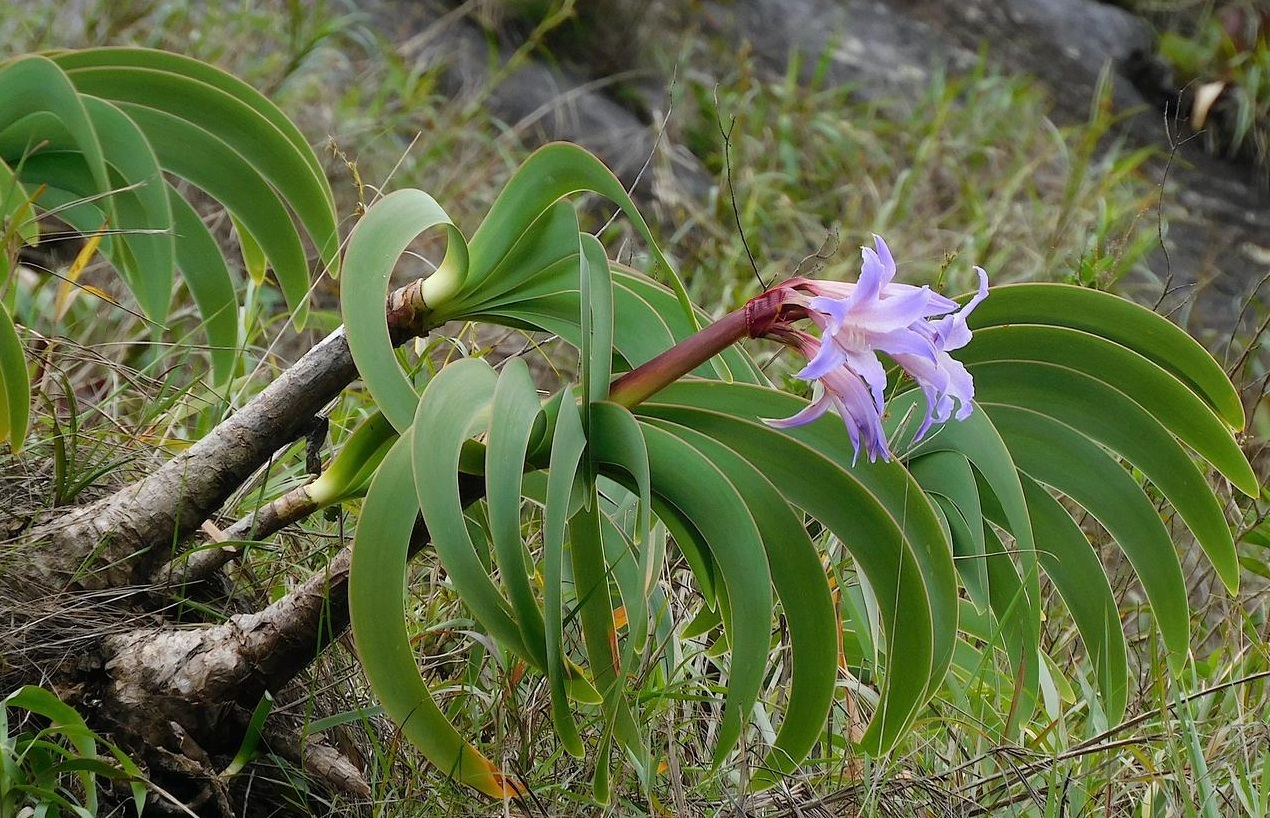
- Worsleya procera near Petrópolis, Brazil

Conservation status
- Critically Endangered (IUCN 3.1)

Scientific classification
- Kingdom: Plantae
- Clade: Tracheophytes
- Clade: Angiosperms
- Clade: Monocots
- Order: Asparagales
- Family: Amaryllidaceae
- Subfamily: Amaryllidoideae
- Tribe: Griffineae
- Genus: Worsleya (W.Watson ex Traub) Traub
- Species: W. procera

Binomial name
- Worsleya procera (Lem.) Traub

Synonyms
- Amaryllis subg. Worselya W.Watson ex Traub; Hippeastrum procerum Lem.; Amaryllis procera Duch. 1863, illegitimate homonym not Salisb. 1796; Amaryllis rayneri Hook.f.; Worsleya rayneri (Hook.f.) Traub & Moldenke

= Worsleya =

Genus of flowering plants

Worsleya is a genus of Brazilian plants in the amaryllis family Amaryllidaceae, cultivated as an ornamental because of its showy, pale violet flowers, often with a yellow stripe down the middle of each tepal. There is only one known species, Worsleya procera, native to eastern Brazil. It is endemic to the mountains around Petrópolis, about 40–50 km (25–31 mi) north of Rio de Janeiro. Here the sickle-shaped leaves curve northward. When grown in the northern hemisphere, the leaves curve southward. It has one of the largest bulbs, around 1.5 m (4 ft 11 in) high by up to 30 cm (12 in) thick near the base) and also rarest members of the subfamily Amaryllidoideae (family Amaryllidaceae).

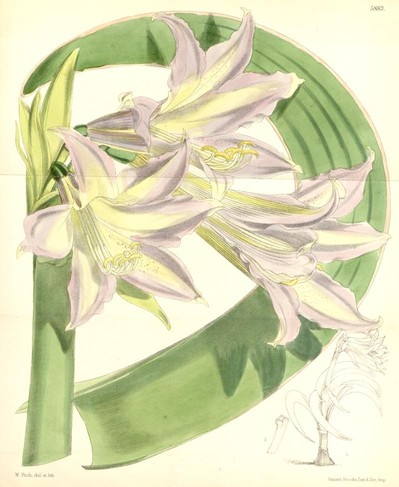
Botanical illustration of Worsleya procera

This species is also known as the Empress of Brazil because of its origin in South America and in reference to Teresa Cristina, the wife of Emperor Dom Pedro II. It grows in very extreme and moist environments, and is commonly found near waterfalls in rich soil situated on granite rocks (which is why it is sometimes considered to be a lithophyte) and sunny places. However, it can be difficult to cultivate. It has plenty of needs, though it can exhibit great hardiness. It also has many ornamental traits.

== Description ==
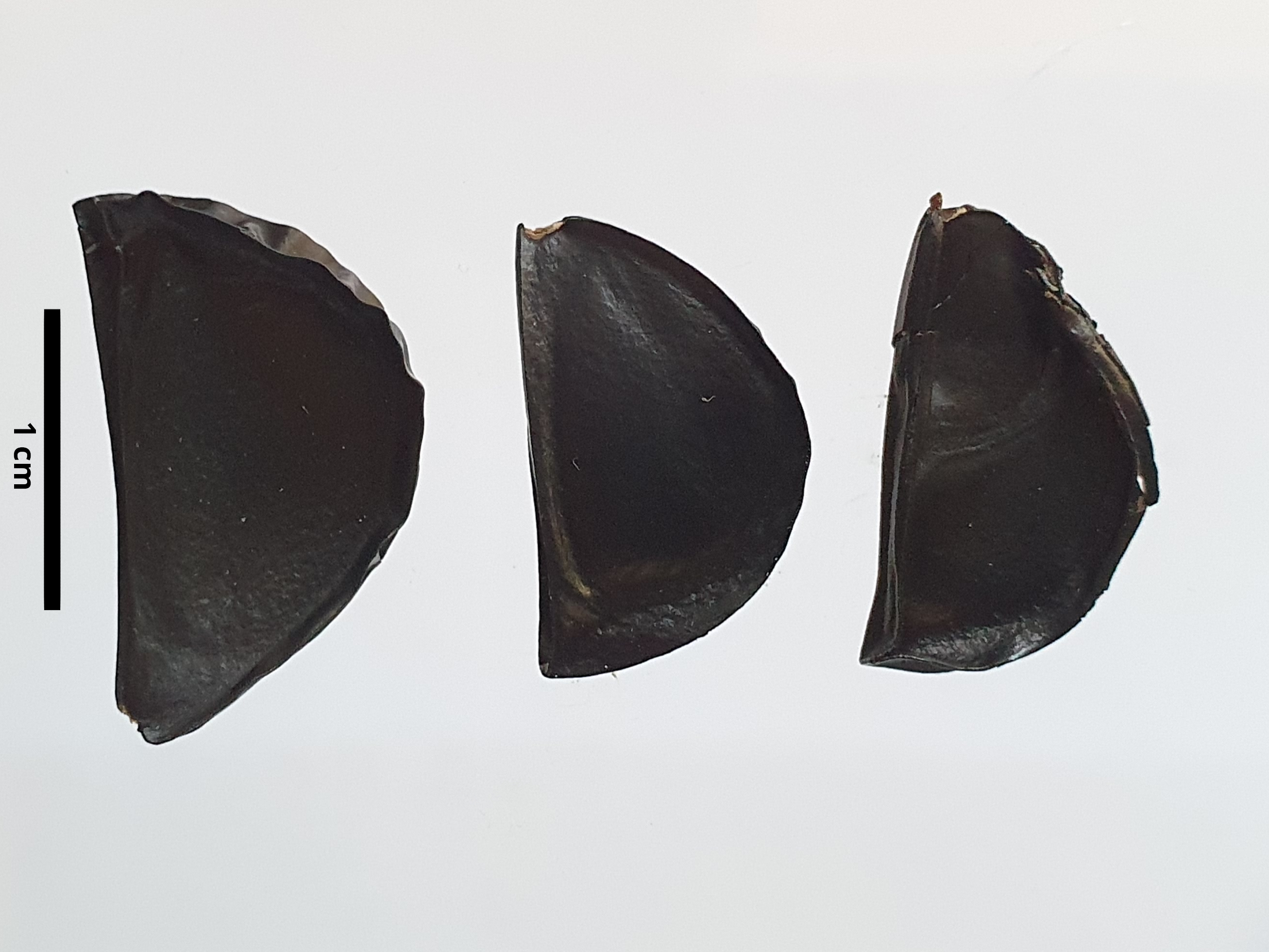
Seeds of Worsleya procera (Lem.) Traub with scale bar (1 cm)

The plant has a large bulb that produces a high stem with green recurved leaves. Worsleya produces spectacular and beautiful blooms. They are large, lilac to blue, with small freckles on them. The seeds are black and semicircular, and (when cultivated) are usually sown in pumice or sometimes Sphagnum, although with Sphagnum the threat of decay is higher.

== Conservation ==
It is critically endangered, and it is included in the Brazilian official list of endangered species.

== Etymology ==
It is named after Arthington Worsley (1861-1943).

== Cytology ==
The diploid chromosome count is 2n = 42 unlike its sister group Griffinia with 2n = 20.
