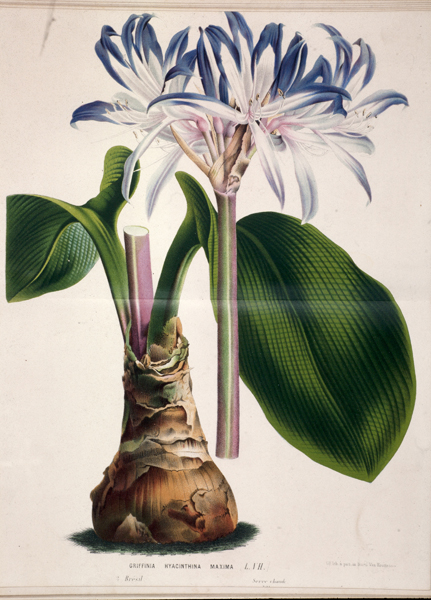

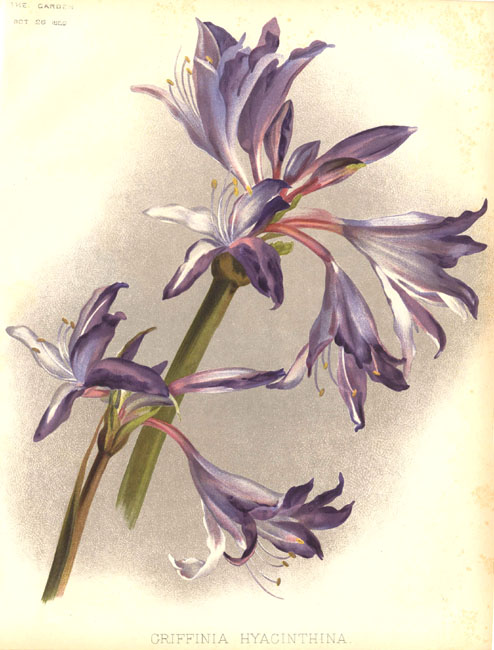
- Botanical illustrations of Griffinia hyacinthina

Scientific classification
- Kingdom: Plantae
- Clade: Tracheophytes
- Clade: Angiosperms
- Clade: Monocots
- Order: Asparagales
- Family: Amaryllidaceae
- Subfamily: Amaryllidoideae
- Genus: Griffinia
- Species: G. hyacinthina

Binomial name
- Griffinia hyacinthina (Ker Gawl.) Ker Gawl.
- Griffinia hyacinthina is endemic to Brazil

Synonyms
- Amaryllis hyacinthina Ker Gawl.; Lycoris hyacinthina (Ker Gawl.) Herb.; Amaryllis dryades Vell.; Griffinia dryades (Vell.) M.Roem.; Griffinia hookeri Kraenzl.; Hippeastrum dryades (Vell.) Kraenzl.

= Griffinia hyacinthina =

Species of flowering plant

Griffinia hyacinthina is a bulbous species of flowering plant which is endemic to Brazil.

== Description ==
=== Vegetative characteristics ===
It is a bulbous, perennial, terrestrial herb with ovate, tunicate, up to 7.5 cm wide bulbs bearing 5-7, dark green, oblong, glabrous, petiolate 20 cm long, and 5-7 cm wide leaves with an acute or acuminate apex. The leaves have a lattice-like venation. The midrib of the leaf is prominent on the underside of the leaf.

=== Generative characteristics ===
The up to 60 cm long umbellate inflorescence, which exceeds the leaves in its height, bears up to seventeen blue-violet flowers lacking fragrance. The cylindric scape is unstreaked and turns red towards the base. The flowers have 6 7 cm long, lanceolate tepals with an acute apex. The tepals are blue to violet towards the apex, but they are white at the base. The flower has 6 stamens with whitish anthers, which are shorter than the tepals. The upper stamen is erect and the other five are pointing downwards. The trilocular ovary is subglobose. The stigma is simple. The ovoid or obovoid, trivalvular capsule fruit bears 1–3 rounded, dark brown, large and fleshy seeds. Within Griffinia subgenus Griffinia, it has the largest flowers. Flowering occurs in the period of March through April. Up to five flowers may be open at the same time and they last for approximately one week.

== Reproduction ==
=== Generative reproduction ===
Flower and fruit formation in its natural habitat occurs in March to April. Infructescences with 1-7 fruits are formed. Each pear-shaped fruit contains 1-3 seeds. Germination occurs within a period of 1-3 months and the seedlings reach maturity within 3-4 years.

=== Vegetative reproduction ===
Vegetative reproduction occurs through bulbils, which form clusters around the mother plant.

== Taxonomy ==
This species was first described in 1817 as Amaryllis hyacinthina Ker Gawl. by John Bellenden Ker Gawler. Three years later he transferred it to Griffinia as Griffinia hyacinthina (Ker Gawl.) Ker Gawl. It is the type species of its genus.

== Etymology ==
The specific epithet hyacinthina means blue-coloured. The flowers are hyacinthine blue.

== Distribution and habitat ==
Like related species, Griffinia hyacinthina is endemic to Brazil. It is native to the south-eastern part of the country, specifically the Atlantic Forest. It grows in a very specific habitat. It requires the warmth, deep shade and high humidity of the tropical rainforest where the floor is covered with large quantities of organic matter.

== Conservation ==
This species is endangered. It is threatened by extinction, due to habitat destruction.

== Cultivation ==
It should be cultivated in well draining soils with a high proportion of organic material. It is a slowly growing species.
