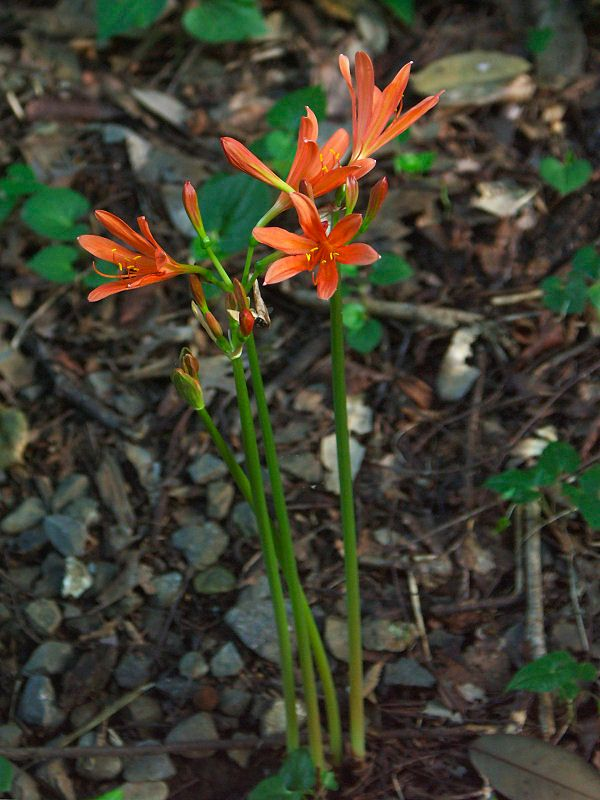
- Flowers appear without leaves in August

Scientific classification
- Kingdom: Plantae
- Clade: Embryophytes
- Clade: Tracheophytes
- Clade: Angiosperms
- Clade: Monocots
- Order: Asparagales
- Family: Amaryllidaceae
- Subfamily: Amaryllidoideae
- Genus: Lycoris
- Species: L. sanguinea

Binomial name
- Lycoris sanguinea Maxim.

Synonyms
- List: Hippeastrum sanguineum (Maxim.) H.Lév.; Lycoris kiushiana Makino; Lycoris koreana Nakai; Lycoris sanguinea f. albiflora Honda; Lycoris sanguinea f. albiflora Y.N.Lee; Lycoris sanguinea f. albovirescens E.Doi ex Akasawa; Lycoris sanguinea var. cyrtanthiflora Worsley; Lycoris sanguinea f. palensflos Konta; Lycoris sanguinea f. plena T.Yamaz.; Ungernia oldhamii Maxim.

= Lycoris sanguinea =

- Close-up of flowers

Species of plant

Lycoris sanguinea, the orange spider lily or orange surprise lily, is a species of flowering plant in the family Amaryllidaceae. It is native to Korea and to central and southern Japan. An erect bulbous geophyte, it is hardy in USDA zones 6 to 10, and is recommended as a bedding or border plant.

== Subtaxa ==
The following varieties are accepted:

- Lycoris sanguinea var. kiushiana Makino ex T.Koyama – Central and southern Japan
- Lycoris sanguinea var. koreana (Nakai) T.Koyama – Korea, Kyushu
- Lycoris sanguinea var. sanguinea – Central and southern Japan
