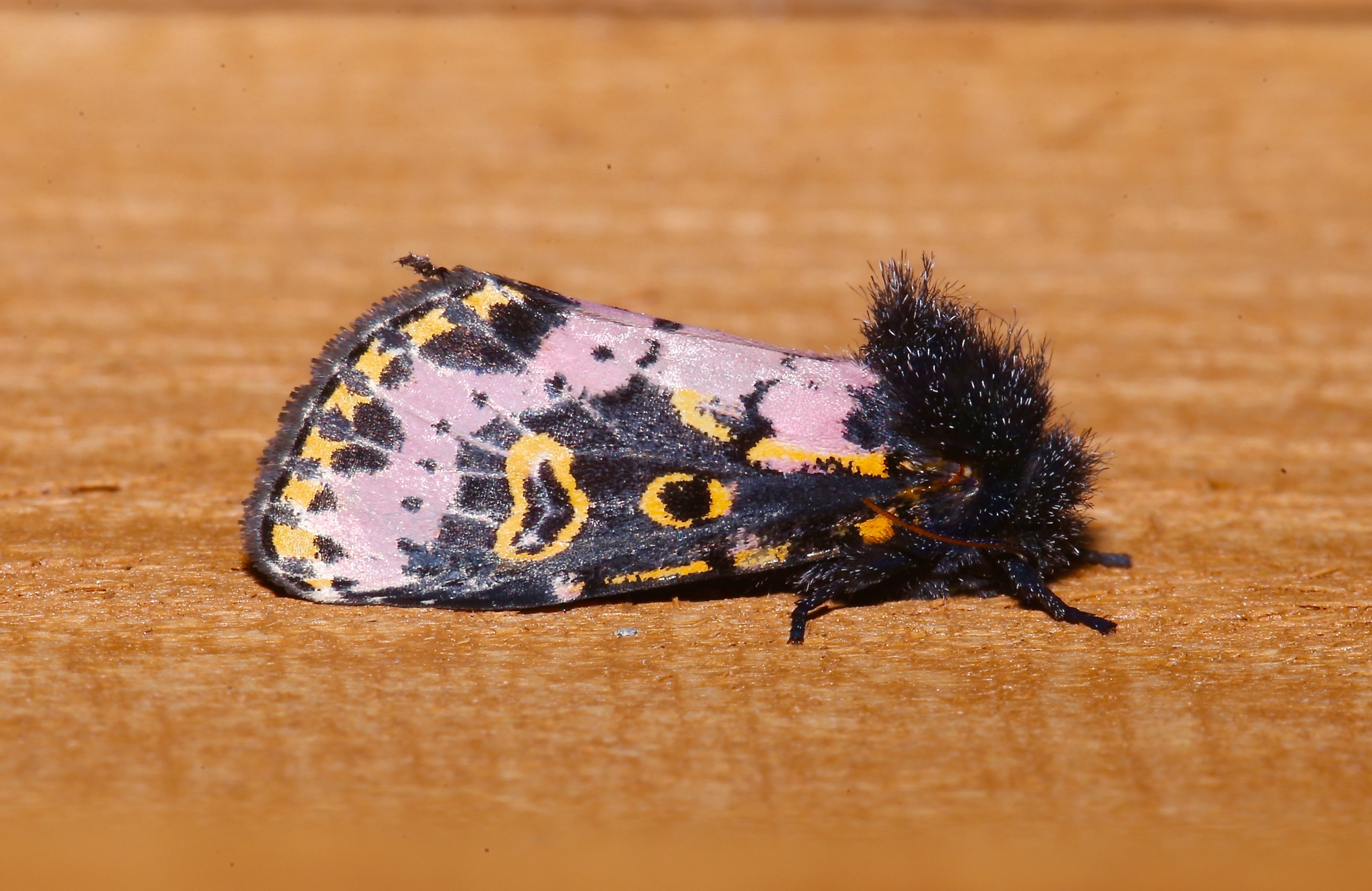

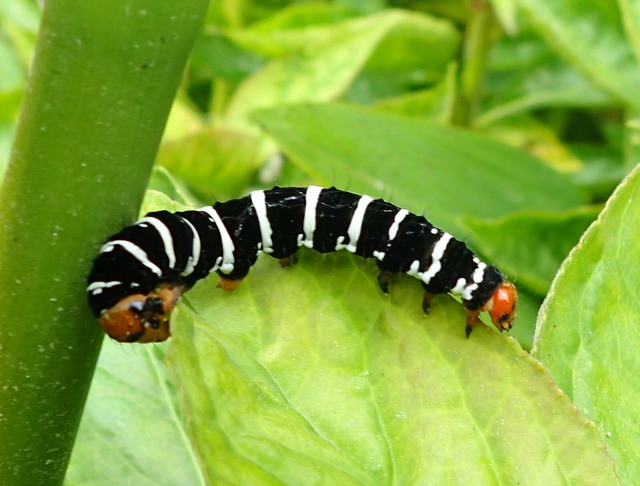
- Adult (top), and larva (lower)

Scientific classification
- Kingdom: Animalia
- Phylum: Arthropoda
- Clade: Pancrustacea
- Class: Insecta
- Order: Lepidoptera
- Superfamily: Noctuoidea
- Family: Noctuidae
- Genus: Xanthopastis
- Species: X. regnatrix

Binomial name
- Xanthopastis regnatrix (Grote, 1863)

Synonyms
- Philochrysa regnatrix Grote, [1864]

= Xanthopastis regnatrix =

Species of moth

Xanthopastis regnatrix, the Spanish moth or convict caterpillar, is a moth of the family Noctuidae. It occurs in the United States, where it is found from North Carolina to Texas and south to Florida. Strays have been recorded as far north as coastal New York, and inland as far north as Kentucky.

== Taxonomy ==
The species known as Xanthopastis timais is now recognized as a species complex. The name for the species in eastern United States is Xanthopastis regnatrix (Type locality: Pennsylvania).
