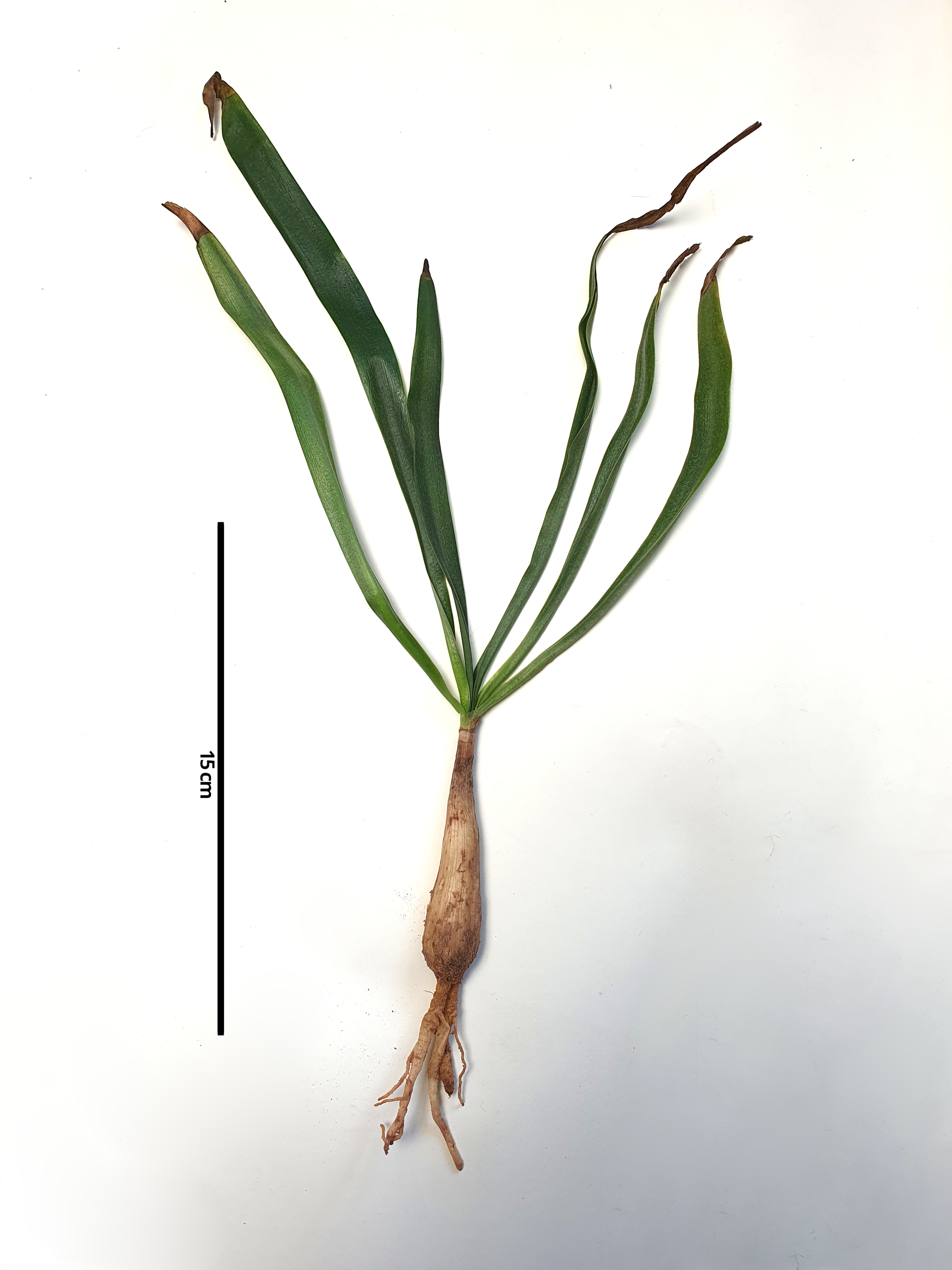
- Griffinia gardneriana bulb

Scientific classification
- Kingdom: Plantae
- Clade: Tracheophytes
- Clade: Angiosperms
- Clade: Monocots
- Order: Asparagales
- Family: Amaryllidaceae
- Subfamily: Amaryllidoideae
- Genus: Griffinia
- Subgenus: Griffinia subg. Hyline

Type species
- Griffinia gardneriana (Herb.) Ravenna

Species
- See here
- It is endemic to Brazil

= Griffinia subg. Hyline =

Subgenus of flowering plants

Griffinia subg. Hyline is a subgenus of the genus Griffinia endemic to Brazil.

== Description ==
The species of Griffinia subg. Hyline have nocturnal flowers with long narrow tepals. The 6 stamens are closely fascicled and declined. There are many ovules per cell in the ovary.

== Taxonomy ==
It was first published as Hyline Herb. by William Herbert in 1840. It was merged into the genus Griffinia Ker Gawl. as Griffinia subg. Hyline (Herb.) Ravenna by Pedro Felix Ravenna in 1969. The type species is Griffinia gardneriana (Herb.) Ravenna.

=== Species ===
It has two species:

- Griffinia gardneriana (Herb.) Ravenna
- Griffinia nocturna Ravenna

== Distribution and habitat ==
Griffinia gardneriana is native of the Brazilian states of Ceará, Pernambuco and Piauí, and Griffinia nocturna is native to southern Goiás.
