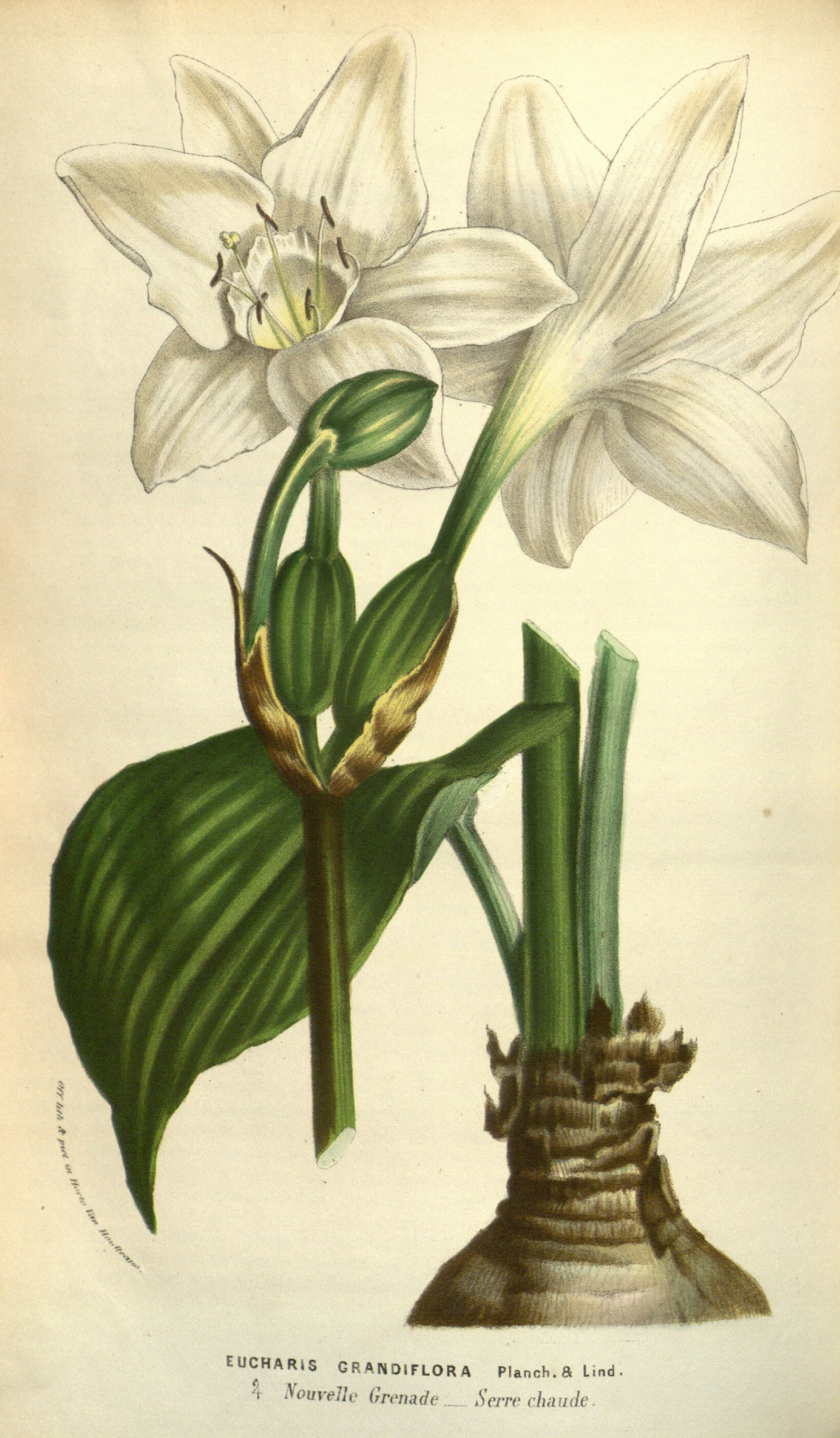
- The illustration of Urceolina × grandiflora in the original publication. The green lines below the staminal cup are filamental traces along the perianth tube.

Scientific classification
- Kingdom: Plantae
- Clade: Tracheophytes
- Clade: Angiosperms
- Clade: Monocots
- Order: Asparagales
- Family: Amaryllidaceae
- Subfamily: Amaryllidoideae
- Genus: Urceolina
- Species: U. × grandiflora

Binomial name
- Urceolina × grandiflora (Planch. & Linden) Traub

Synonyms
- Eucharis × grandiflora Planch. & Linden; Eucharis × lowii Baker; Eucharis × mastersii Baker; Urceolina × lowii (Baker) Traub; Urceolina × mastersii (Baker) Traub

= Urceolina × grandiflora =

Species of flowering plant

Urceolina × grandiflora, formerly known as Eucharis × grandiflora, is a natural hybrid putatively between U. moorei and U. sanderi of the family Amaryllidaceae, native to western Colombia and western Ecuador.

The aneutriploid species U. amazonica is often misidentified as U. × grandiflora. Both of them are sterile plants with large fragrant white flowers, but they differ in leaf length, free filament shape, and staminal cup length:

- U. × grandiflora has shorter leaf blades (20–33 cm × (10–)13–16 cm), linear or narrowly subulate free filaments (1–1.5 mm wide at the base), and staminal cups (5–7 mm long to the apex of teeth) shorter than free filaments (7–8.5(–10) mm long).
- U. amazonica has longer leaf blades ((20–)30–40(–50) cm × (10–)12–18 cm), subulate free filaments (2.8–3.4 mm wide at the base), and staminal cups (11.2–13.8 mm long to the apex of teeth) longer than free filaments (6.5–8(–10) mm long).
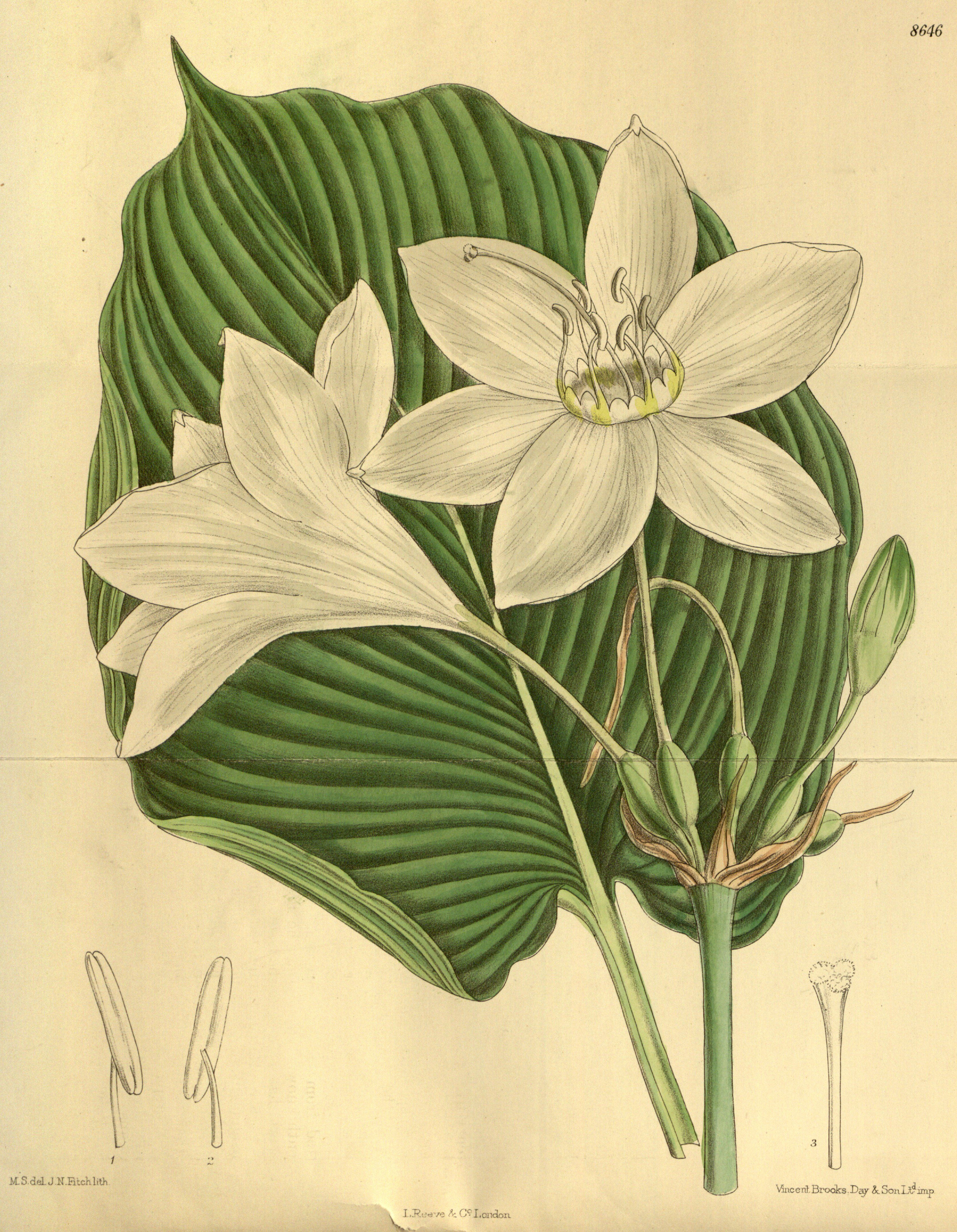
U. × grandiflora has shorter leaf blades, slender free filaments, and staminal cups shorter than free filaments.

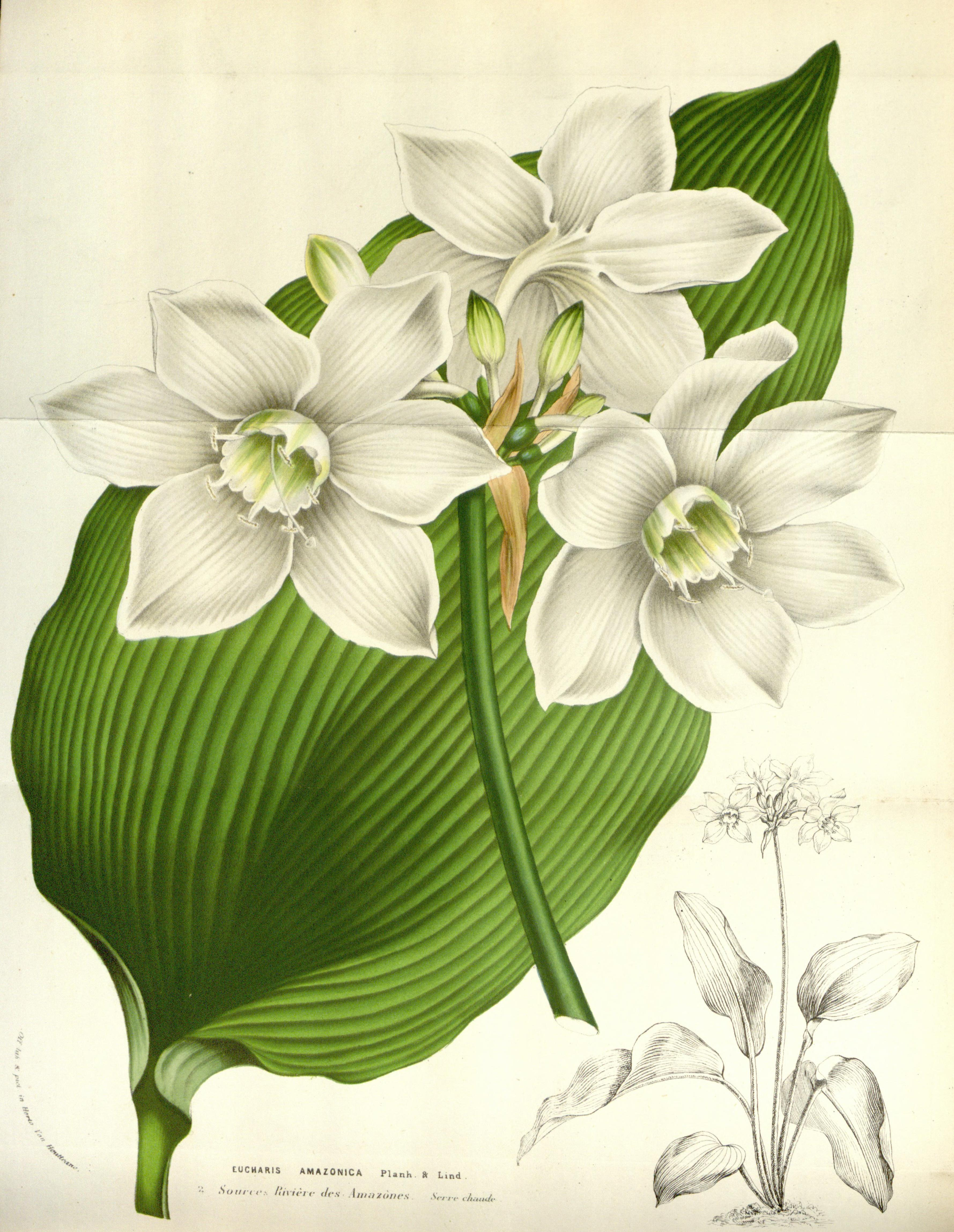
U. amazonica has longer leaf blades, flat free filaments, and staminal cups longer than free filaments.

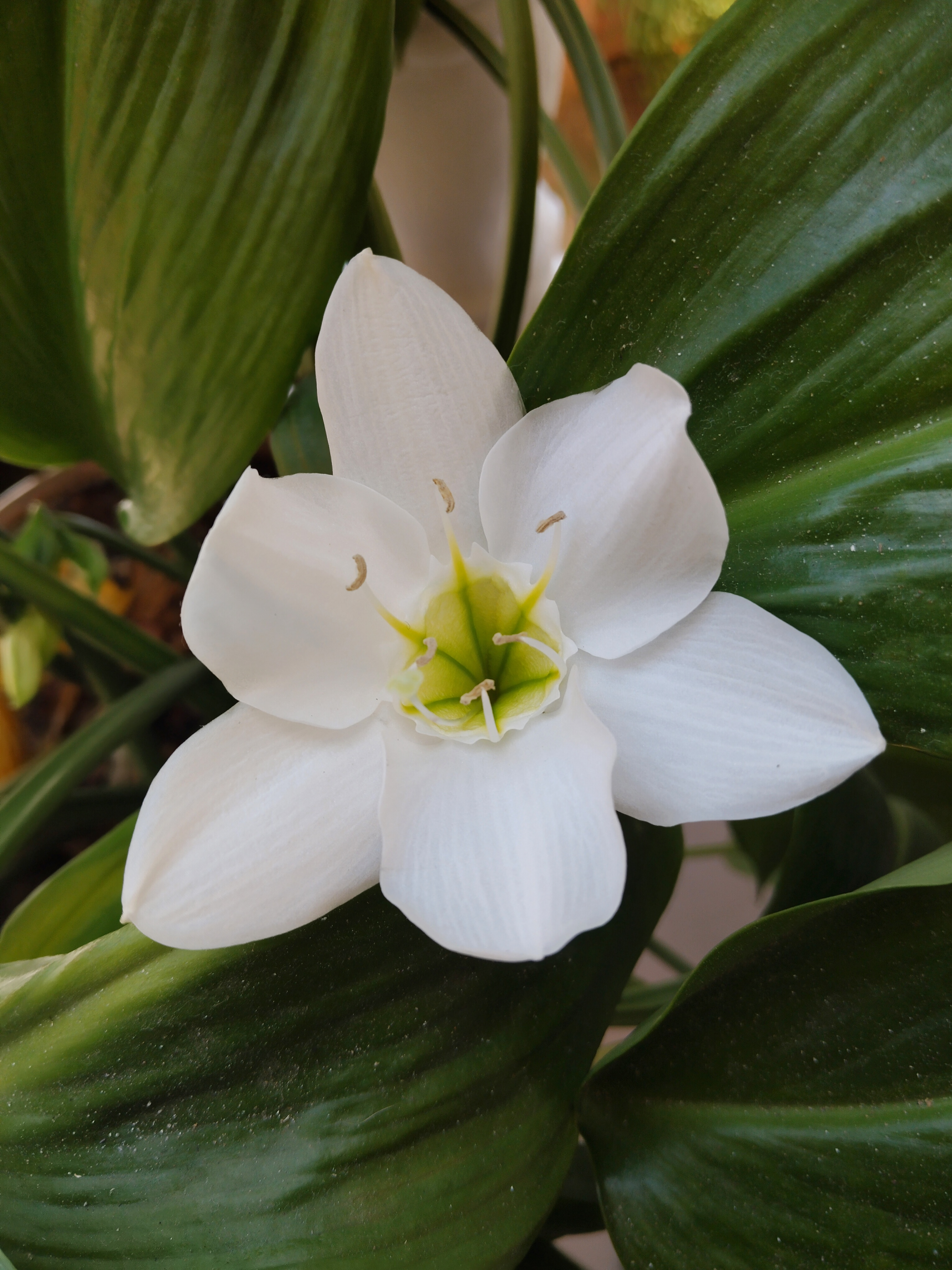
Flower of U. × grandiflora

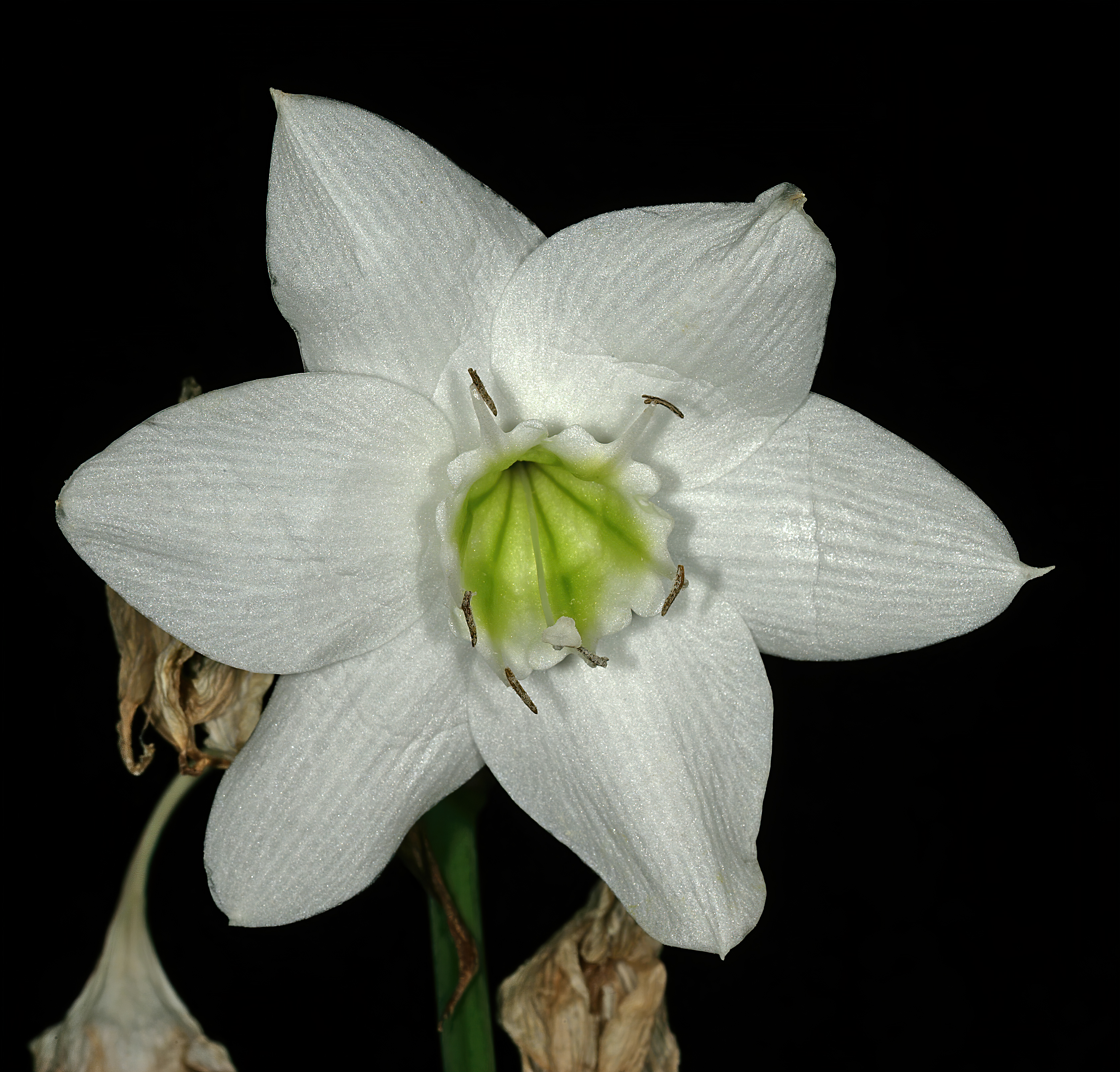
Flower of U. amazonica
