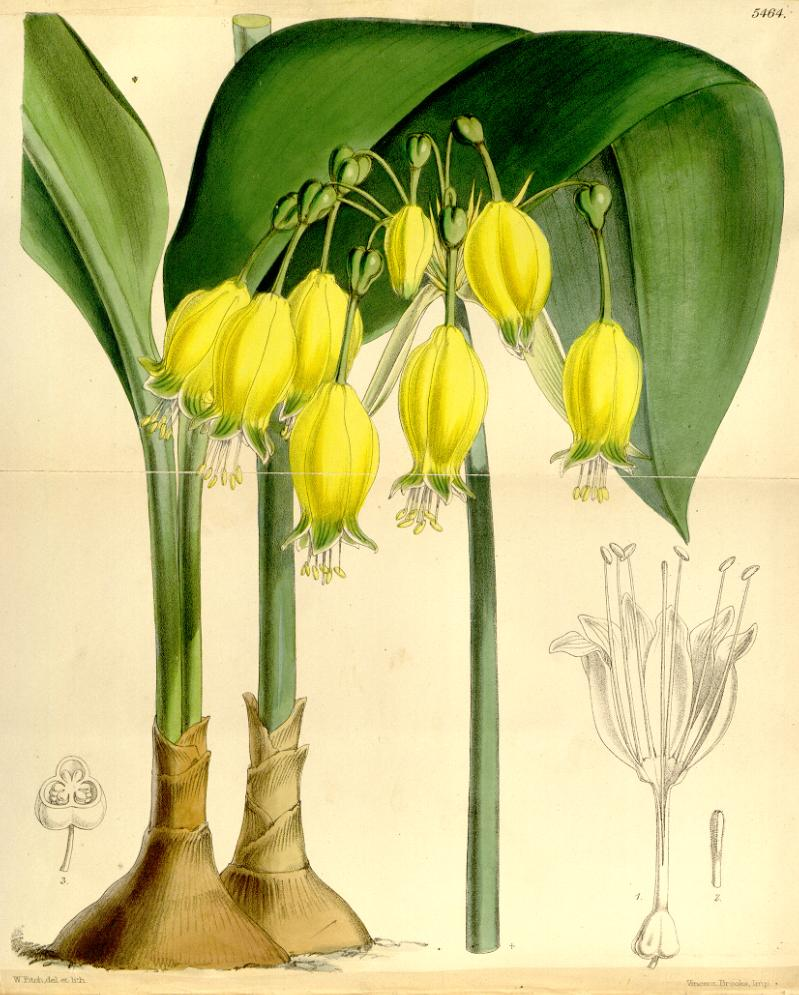

Scientific classification
- Kingdom: Plantae
- Clade: Tracheophytes
- Clade: Angiosperms
- Clade: Monocots
- Order: Asparagales
- Family: Amaryllidaceae
- Subfamily: Amaryllidoideae
- Genus: Urceolina
- Species: U. urceolata

Binomial name
- Urceolina urceolata (Ruiz & Pav.) Asch. & Graebn.
- It is endemic to Peru

Synonyms
- Collania urceolata (Ruiz & Pav.) Schult. & Schult.f.; Crinum urceolatum Ruiz & Pav.; Leperiza urceolata (Ruiz & Pav.) Kuntze; Collania aurea (Lindl.) Rollisson; Urceolaria pendula Herb.; Urceolina aurea Lindl.; Urceolina pendula (Herb.) Herb.

= Urceolina urceolata =

Species of plant

Urceolina urceolata is a perennial plant species in the family Amaryllidaceae. The species is native to Peru.

Plants can reach up to 20 or 30 centimeters in height.

The species was first described and named by Hipólito Ruiz López and José Antonio Pavon, but it was later revised and reclassified by Mary Letitia Green in 1930.
