= Urceolina dodsonii =

Conservation status
- Vulnerable (IUCN 3.1)

Scientific classification
- Kingdom: Plantae
- Clade: Tracheophytes
- Clade: Angiosperms
- Clade: Monocots
- Order: Asparagales
- Family: Amaryllidaceae
- Subfamily: Amaryllidoideae
- Genus: Urceolina
- Species: U. dodsonii

Binomial name
- Urceolina dodsonii (Meerow & Dehgan) Meerow

Synonyms
- Eucrosia dodsonii Meerow & Dehgan

Species of flowering plant

Urceolina dodsonii, formerly known as Eucrosia dodsonii, is a species of flowering plant in the family Amaryllidaceae. It is endemic to Ecuador. Its natural habitat is subtropical or tropical moist montane forests. It is threatened by habitat loss.

It grows from bulbs 2.5–5 cm in diameter. The stalked (petiolate) leaves have blades (laminae) 20 cm long by 12 cm wide. The zygomorphic flowers are yellow, produced in an umbel on a 60 cm tall stem (scape); the stamens have prominent long filaments. Unlike most species in the genus, U. dodsonii does not have nectaries.

In cultivation, plants should be kept warm and dry when the leaves wither, and watered only when the flowers or leaves begin to grow again, when a sunny position is required for about half the day.
