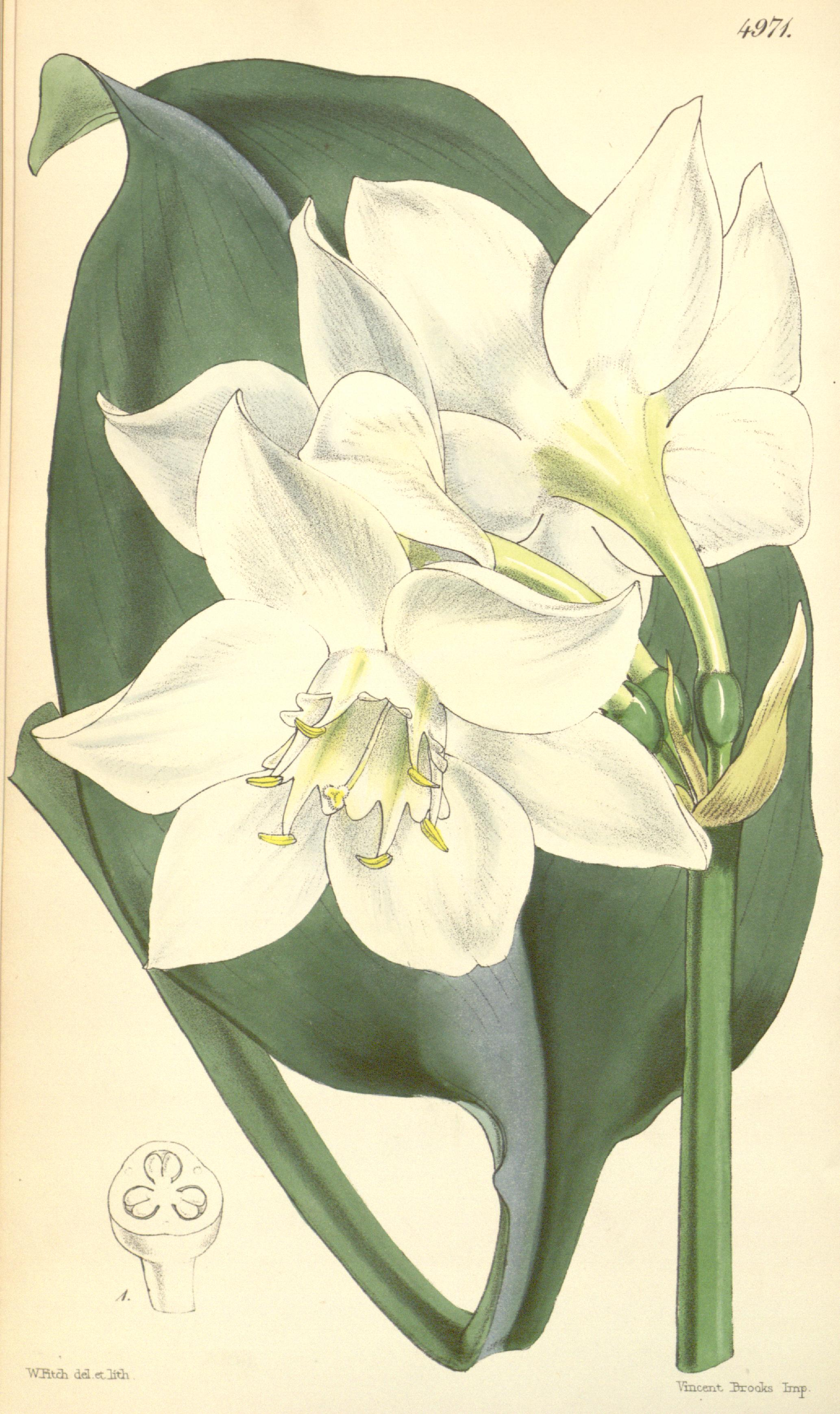
- The first illustration of Urceolina amazonica, from Curtis's Botanical Magazine of 1857, misidentified as Eucharis × grandiflora by William Jackson Hooker

Scientific classification
- Kingdom: Plantae
- Clade: Tracheophytes
- Clade: Angiosperms
- Clade: Monocots
- Order: Asparagales
- Family: Amaryllidaceae
- Subfamily: Amaryllidoideae
- Genus: Urceolina
- Species: U. amazonica

Binomial name
- Urceolina amazonica (Linden ex Planch.) Christenh. & Byng

Synonyms
- Eucharis amazonica Linden ex Planch.

= Urceolina amazonica =

Species of plant

Urceolina amazonica, formerly known as Eucharis amazonica, is a species of flowering plant in the family Amaryllidaceae, native to Peru. It is cultivated as an ornamental in many countries and naturalized in Venezuela, Mexico, the West Indies, Ascension Island, Sri Lanka, Fiji, the Solomon Islands and the Society Islands. The English name Amazon lily is used for this species, but is also used for some other species of the genus Urceolina.

== Description ==
An evergreen bulbous perennial, Urceolina amazonica grows to 75 cm (30 in) tall by 50 cm (20 in) broad, with long narrow dark leaves and umbels of fragrant white flowers with six tepals. The stamens are fused at their bases forming a staminal cup in the center of the perianth. The free parts of filaments are subulate and flat. It is a sterile aneutriploid (2n=3x−1=68).

== Taxonomy ==
The species was introduced to Europe in the summer of 1855 by Marius Porte who discovered it on the banks of the Amazon River near Moyobamba, Peru. Jean Jules Linden named it Eucharis amazonica in his greenhouse catalogue of 1856. The Veitch Nurseries followed Linden and labelled their plants of this species as E. amazonica, but William Jackson Hooker mistook this nomen nudum as an unpublished invention and misidentified the Veitch's plants as E. grandiflora (namely Urceolina × grandiflora) in 1857. Later in the same year, Jules Émile Planchon formally described E. amazonica as a new species and ascribed the name to Linden, but he thought E. amazonica and E. grandiflora might be conspecific and agreed with Hooker's identification.

Hooker's misidentification and Planchon's ambiguous opinion led the subsequent botanists to treat E. amazonica as a synonym of E. grandiflorum. Although Alan Meerow and Bijan Dehgan in 1984 corrected this mistake, the long-time confusion between the two species has persisted and U. amazonica is still frequently misidentified as U. × grandiflora. They differ in leaf length, free filament shape, staminal cup length:

- U. amazonica has longer leaf blades ((20–)30–40(–50) cm × (10–)12–18 cm), subulate free filaments (2.8–3.4 mm wide at the base), and staminal cups (11.2–13.8 mm long to the apex of teeth) longer than free filaments (6.5–8(–10) mm long).
- U. × grandiflora has shorter leaf blades (20–33 cm × (10–)13–16 cm), linear or narrowly subulate free filaments (1–1.5 mm wide at the base), and staminal cups (5–7 mm long to the apex of teeth) shorter than free filaments (7–8.5(–10) mm long).
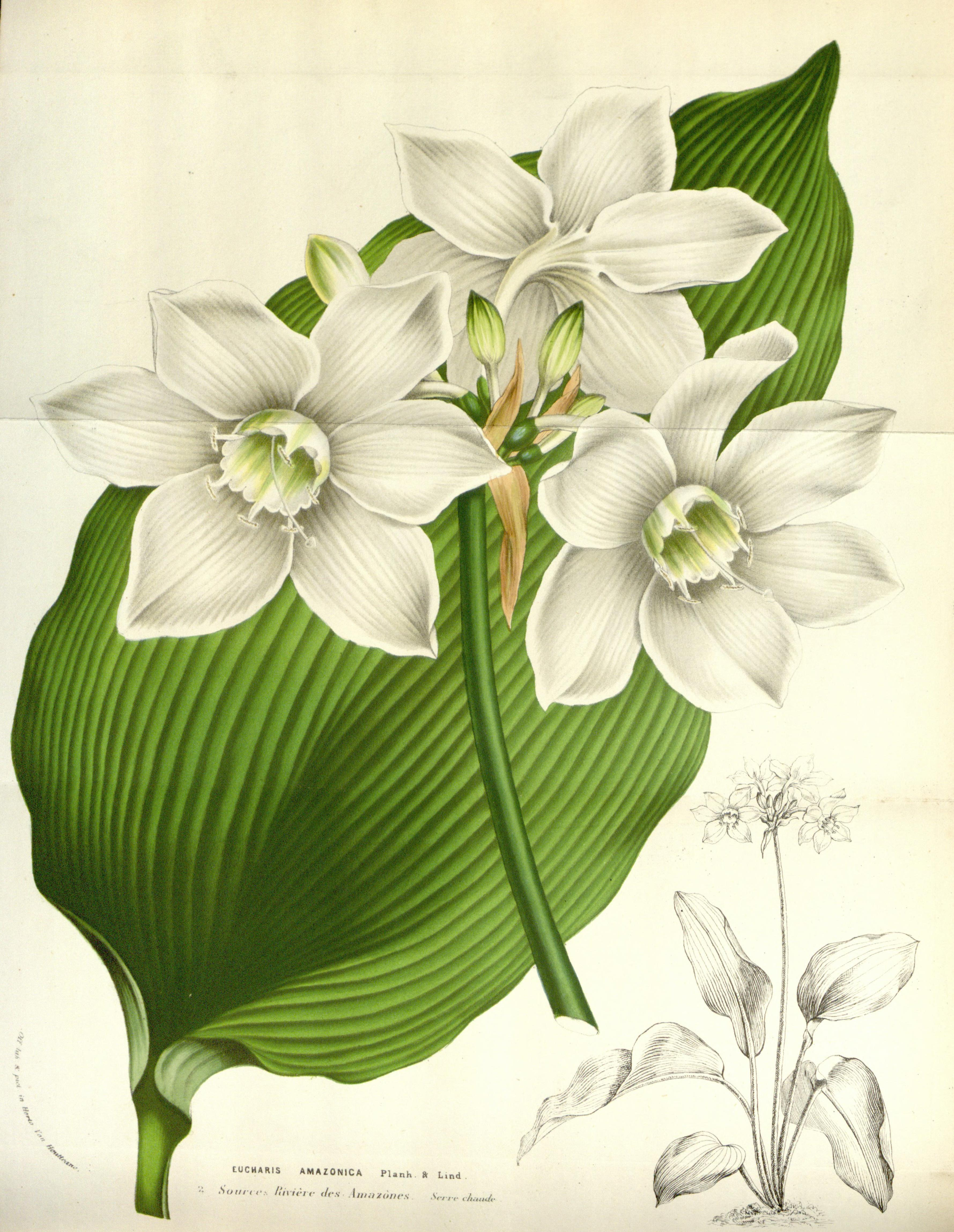
U. amazonica has long leaf blades, flat free filaments, and staminal cups longer than free filaments.

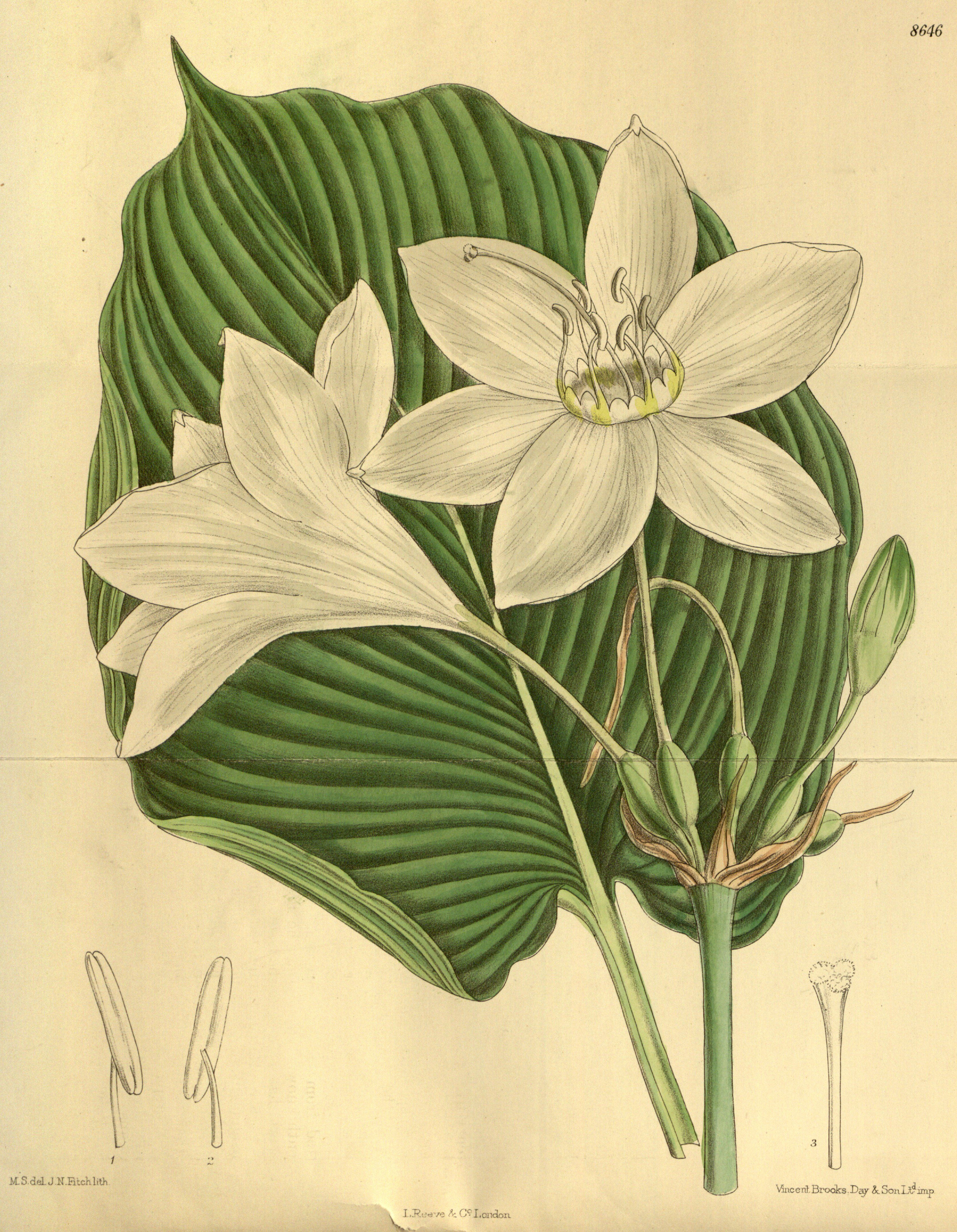
U. × grandiflora has short leaf blades, slender free filaments, and staminal cups shorter than free filaments.

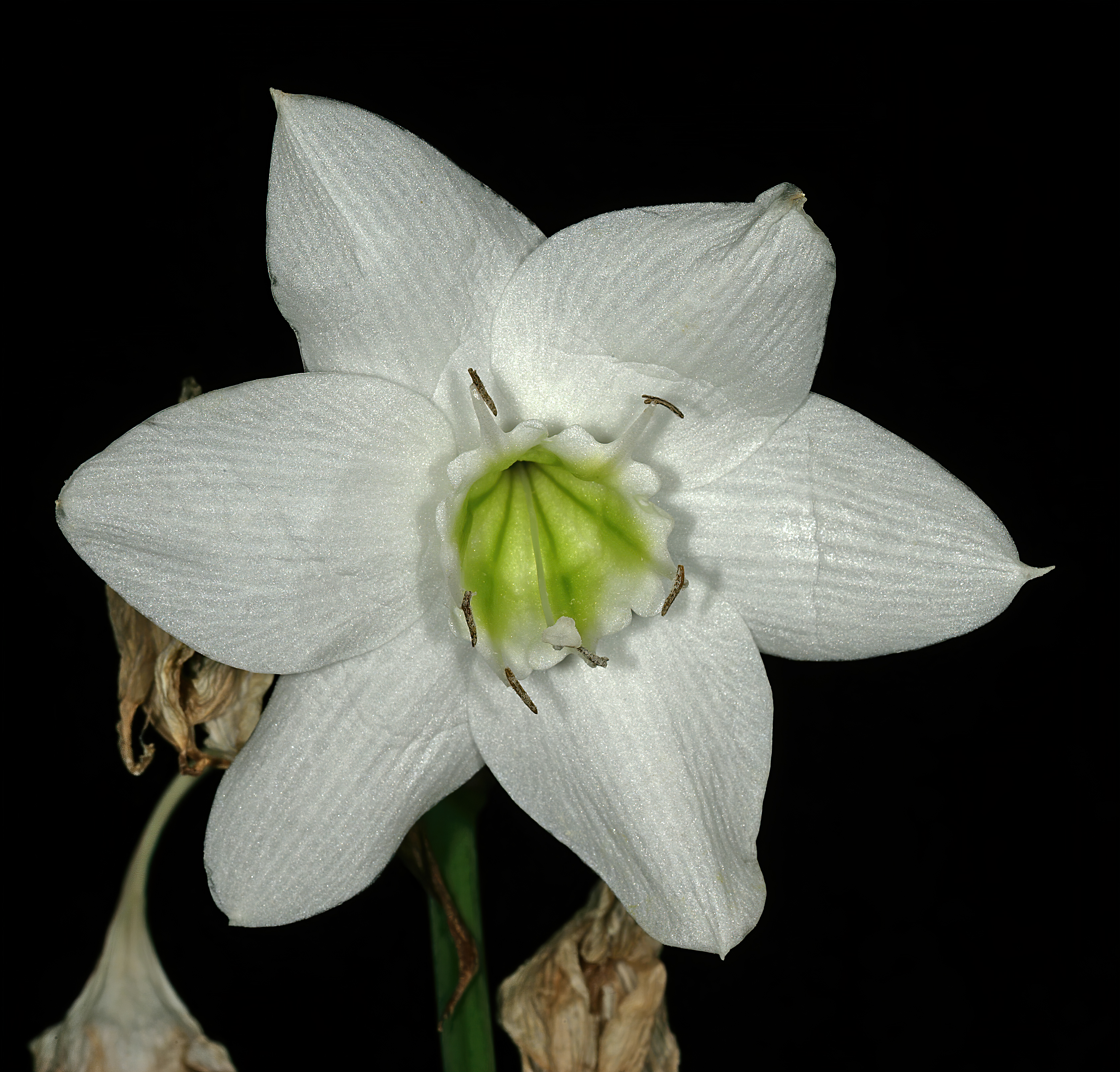
Flower of U. amazonica

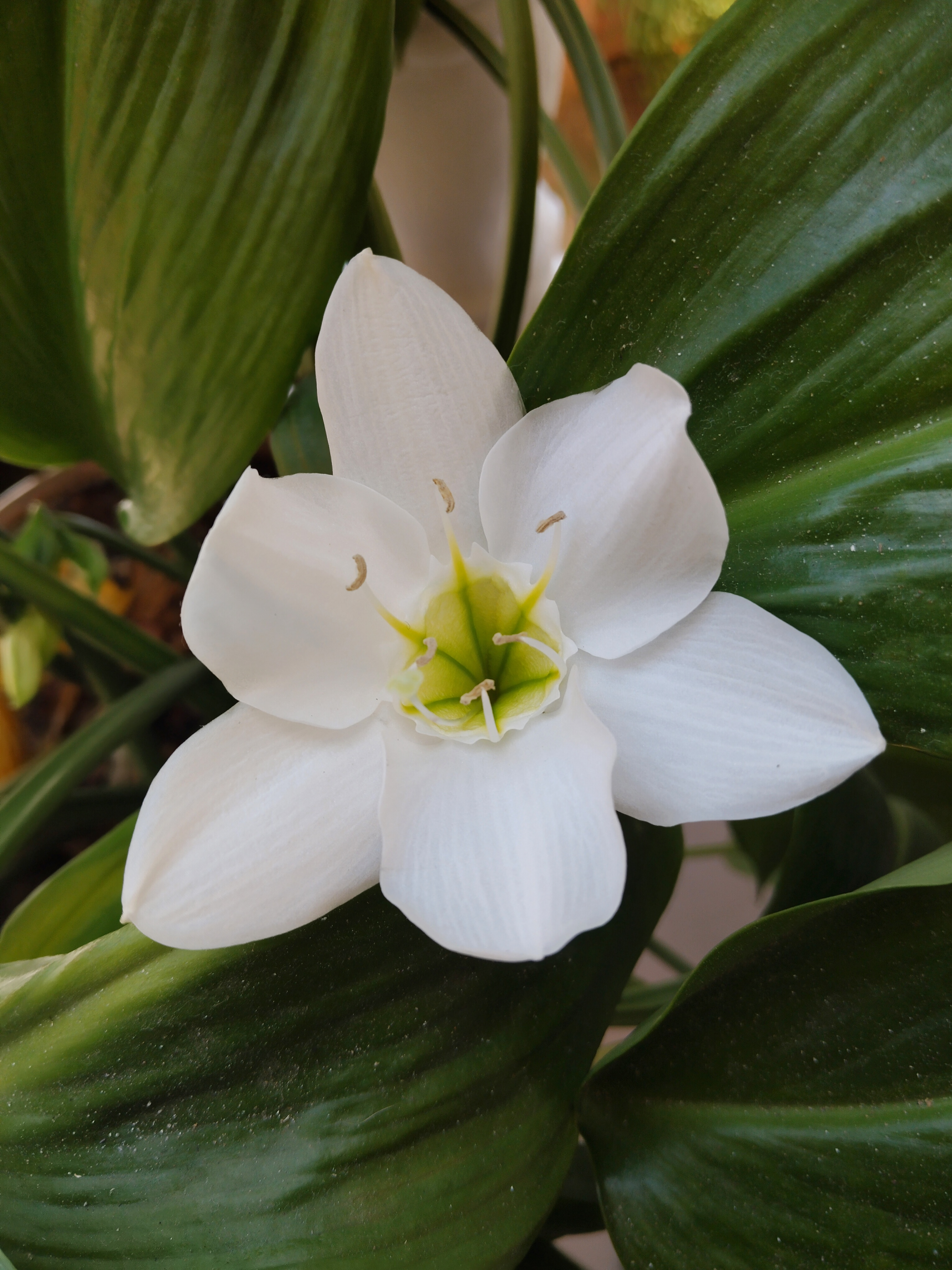
Flower of U. × grandiflora

In 2018, it was transferred from Eucharis to Urceolina. This placement was confirmed in a 2020 molecular phylogenetic study in which it is shown that Eucharis and Urceolina are part of a single clade with extensive ancestral reticulation.

== Cultivation ==
As it is not hardy, U. amazonica requires a sheltered spot with a protective winter mulch in colder areas. It has gained the Royal Horticultural Society's Award of Garden Merit.

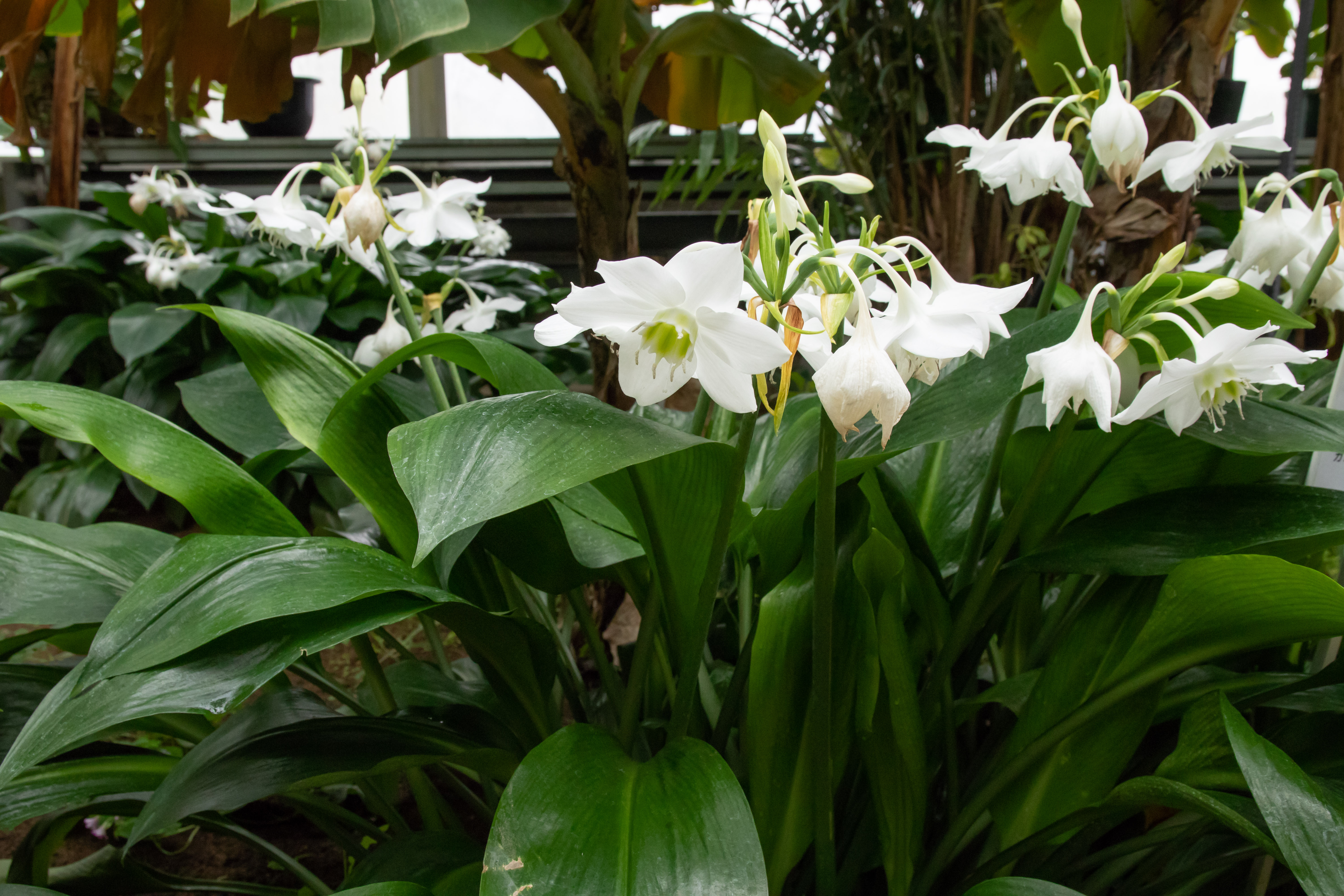
Plants with flowers

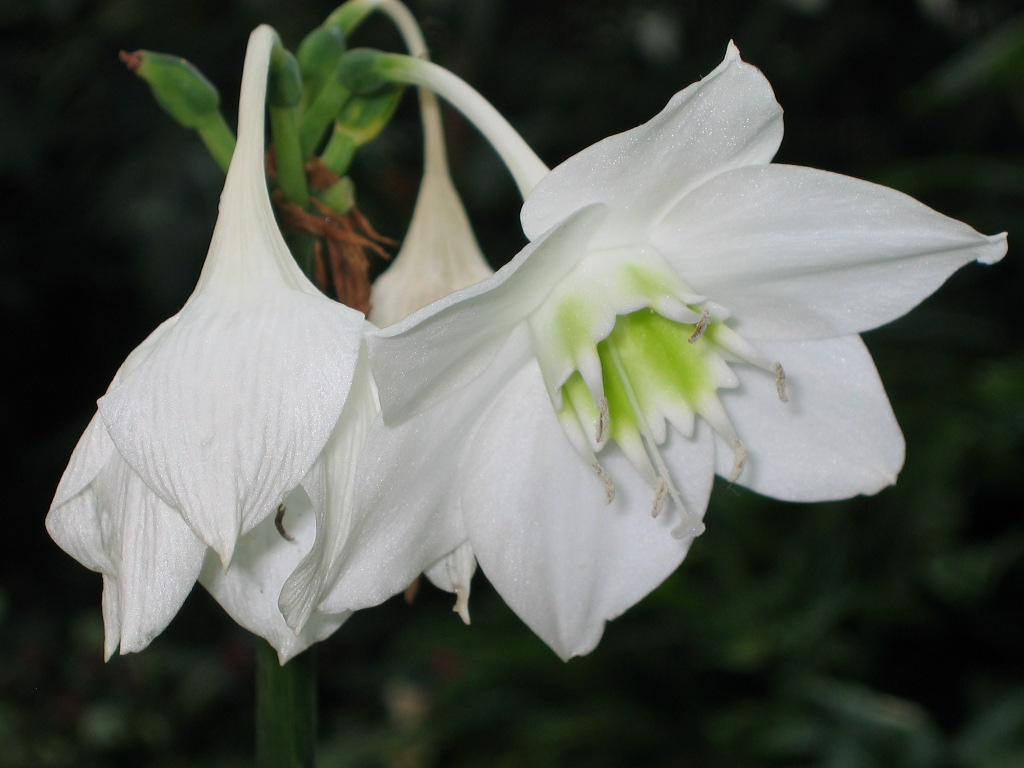
Flowers

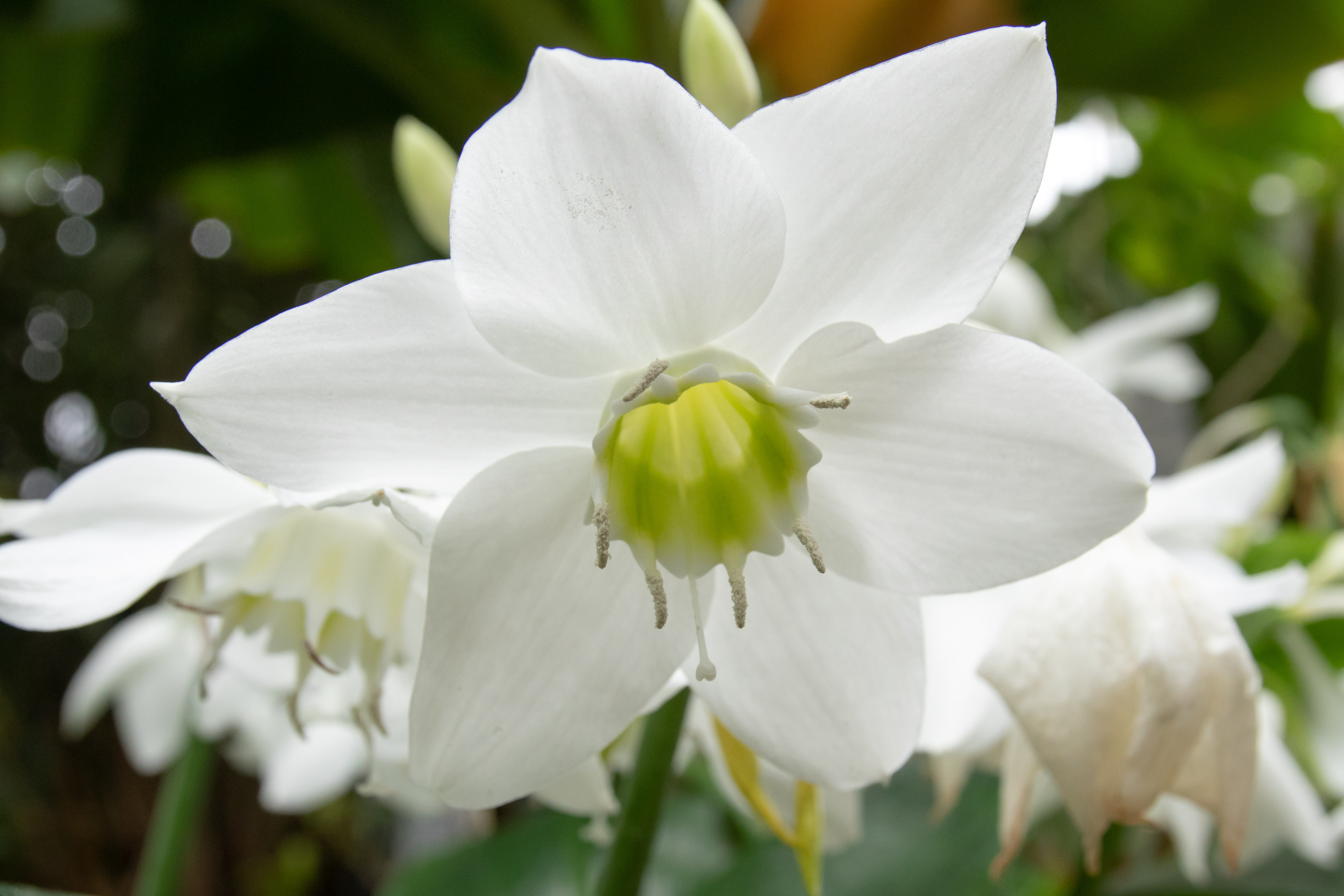
The front of a flower

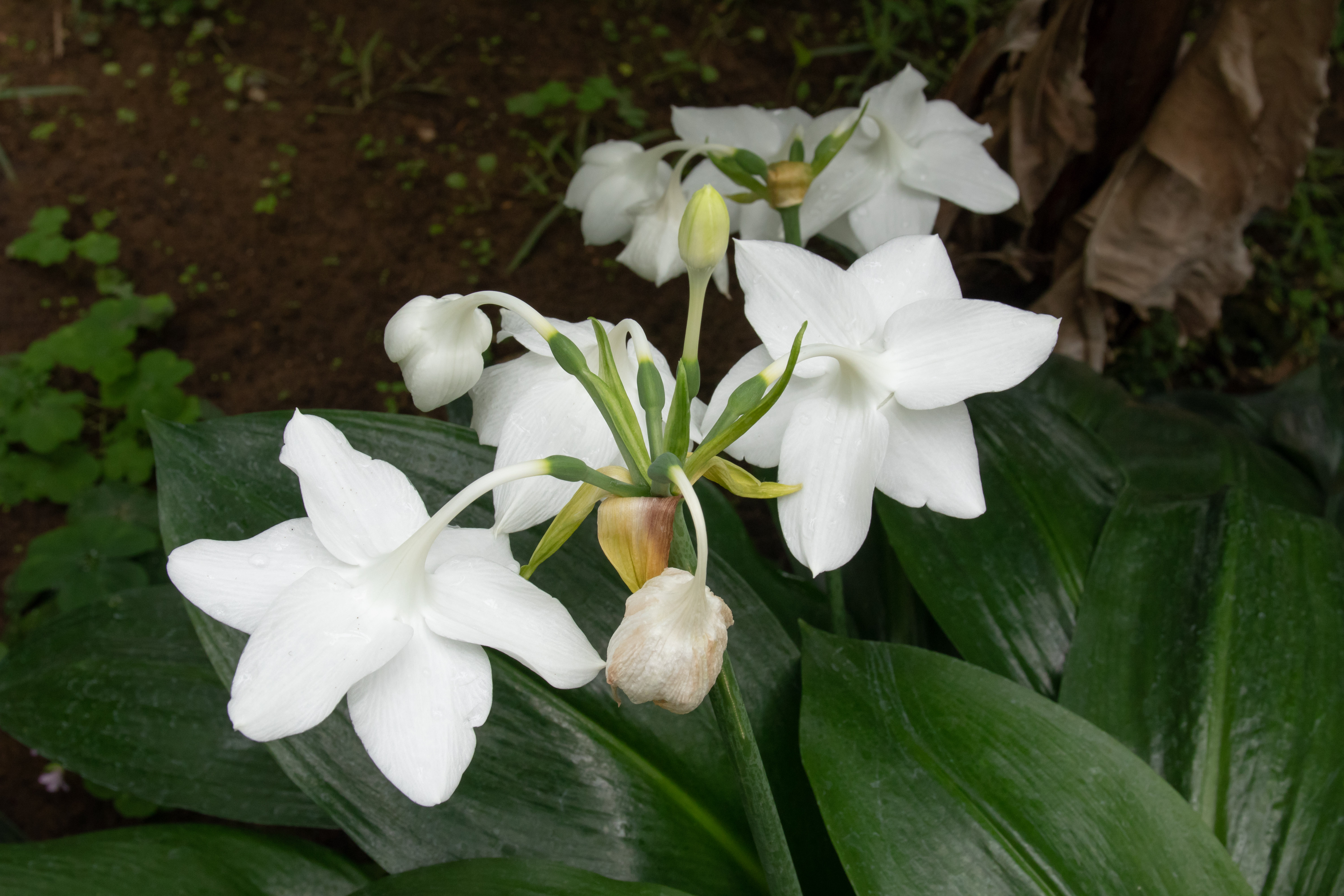
The back of flowers
