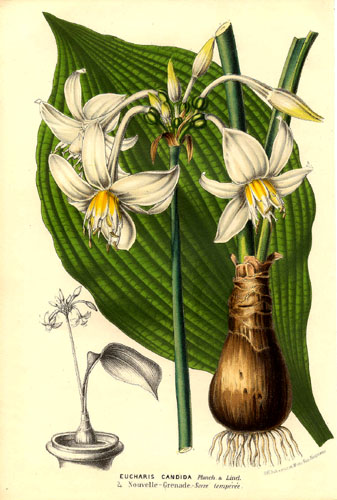

Scientific classification
- Kingdom: Plantae
- Clade: Tracheophytes
- Clade: Angiosperms
- Clade: Monocots
- Order: Asparagales
- Family: Amaryllidaceae
- Subfamily: Amaryllidoideae
- Genus: Urceolina
- Species: U. candida

Binomial name
- Urceolina candida (Planch. & Linden) Traub

Synonyms
- Caliphruria candida (Planch. & Linden) Baill.; Eucharis candida Planch. & Linden

= Urceolina candida =

Species of plant

Urceolina candida is a species of flowering plant in the family Amaryllidaceae. It is native to Colombia, Ecuador and Peru but cultivated as an ornamental in many other regions.

This plant is a bulb-forming her with broadly lanceolate to elliptical leaves, pleated lengthwise. Flowers are drooping, borne in umbels. Tepals are white, egg-shaped, and curl backwards to reveal the yellow anthers.
