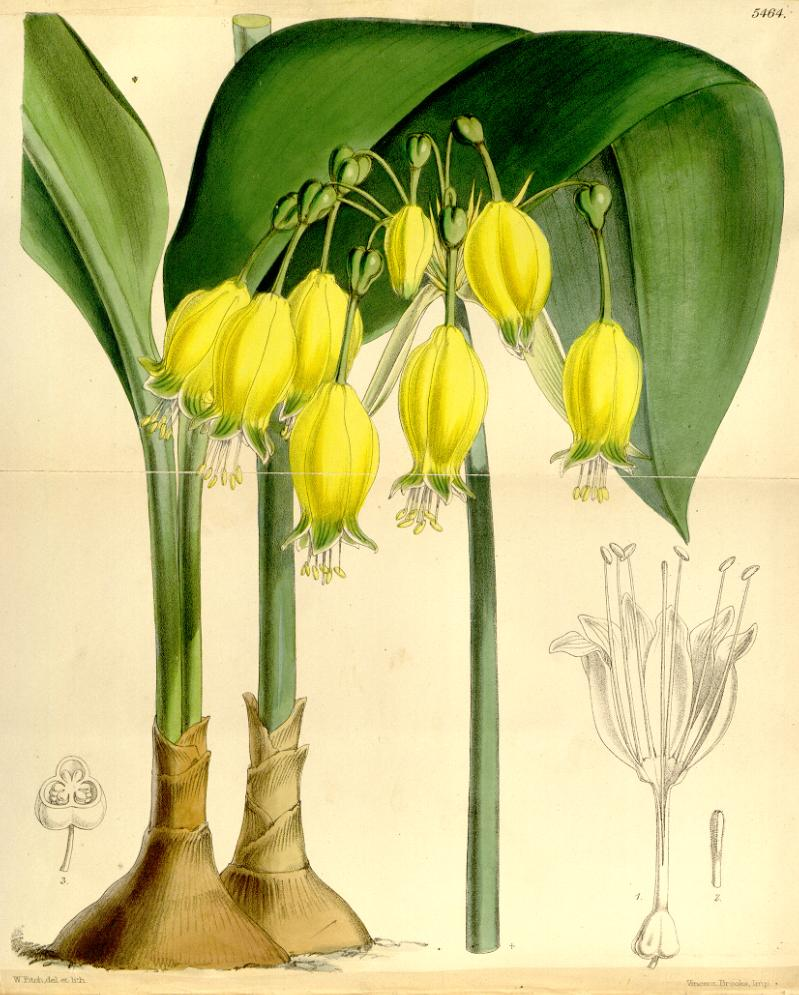
- Urceolina urceolata

Scientific classification
- Kingdom: Plantae
- Clade: Tracheophytes
- Clade: Angiosperms
- Clade: Monocots
- Order: Asparagales
- Family: Amaryllidaceae
- Subfamily: Amaryllidoideae
- Tribe: Eucharideae
- Genus: Urceolina; Rchb.

Type species
- Urceolina urceolata (Ruiz & Pav.) Asch. & Graebn., syn. Urceolaria pendula Herb., nom. illeg.

Synonyms
- × Calicharis Meerow; Caliphruria Herb.; Collania Schult. & Schult.f.; Eucharis Planch. & Linden; Leperiza Herb.; Microdontocharis Baill.; Pseudourceolina Vargas; × Urceocharis Mast.; Urceolaria Herb., nom. illeg.

= Urceolina =

Species of plant

Urceolina is a genus of South American plants in the amaryllis family native to Bolivia, Brazil, Colombia, Costa Rica, Ecuador, Guatemala, Panama, and Peru. It has also been introduced to many South and Central American states, as well as India and Sri Lanka. The formerly accepted genera Eucharis and Caliphruria are now regarded as synonyms of this genus. Many species of this genus share the common name Amazon lily.

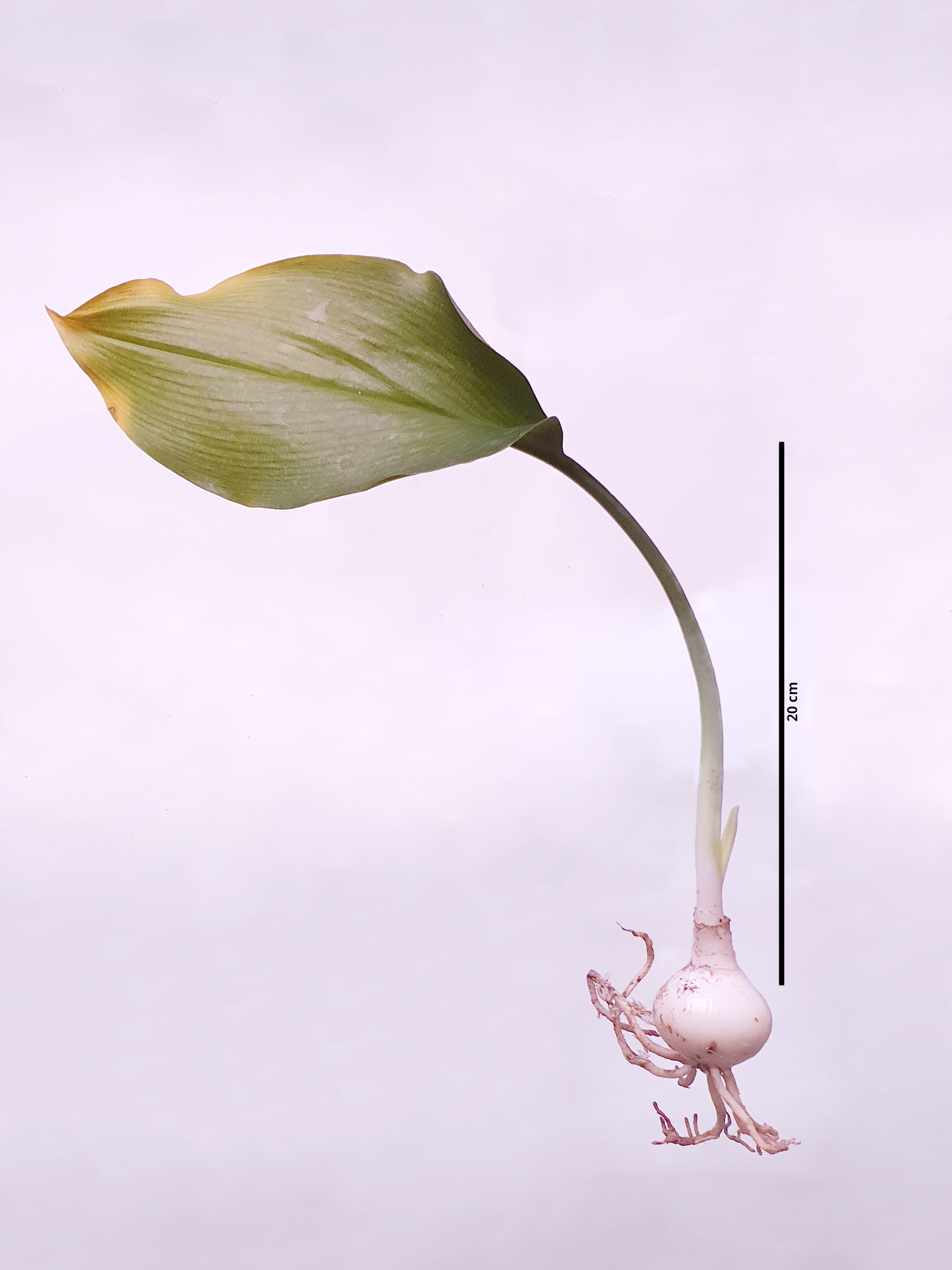
Urceolina × grandiflora (Planch. & Linden) Traub bulb with scale bar (20 cm)

== Taxonomy ==
In 1821, William Herbert published the genus name Urceolaria and transferred Crinum urceolatum to the genus as Urceolaria pendula. However, Herbert's name was illegitimate since the genus name had already been published in 1786 when it was attributed to Juan Ignacio Molina. (Molina's name was later rejected in favour of Sarmienta.) In 1828, Ludwig Reichenbach used the name Urceolina for the genus. This is now a conserved name with the type species being Urceolina urceolata based on Crinum urceolatum.

=== Phylogeny ===
Urceolina is placed in the tribe Eucharideae. Eucharis, whose flower has a conspicuous staminal cup (which is different from the corona of Narcissus), and Caliphruria, whose staminal cup is heavily reduced, were formerly regarded as separate genera within the tribe. A 2020 molecular phylogenetic study showed that these two genera (excluding C. korsakoffii) form a monophyletic clade with Urceolina sensu stricto, sister to Stenomesson:

- Eucharideae
  - Rauhia
  - - Plagiolirion
    - - - Phaedranassa
        - Eucrosia
      - - Stenomesson
        - Urceolina, Eucharis, most of Caliphruria, and Eucrosia dodsonii

The clade showed extensive ancestral reticulation. The authors of the study placed all the species belonging to the clade in an expanded Urceolina.

=== Species ===
Species of the former genera Eucharis and Caliphruria (except C. korsakoffii, now Stenomesson korsakoffii) as well as Eucrosia dodsonii (now Urceolina dodsonii) have been transferred to this genus. Therefore, Urceolina includes the following species:

- Urceolina amazonica (Linden ex Planch.) Christenh. & Byng (= Eucharis amazonica Linden ex Planch.)
- Urceolina astrophiala Ravenna (= Eucharis astrophiala (Ravenna) Ravenna)
- Urceolina ayacucensis Ravenna
- Urceolina bakeriana (N.E.Br.) Traub (= Eucharis bakeriana N.E.Br.)
- Urceolina bonplandii (Kunth) Traub (= Eucharis bonplandii (Kunth) Traub)
- Urceolina bouchei (Woodson & P.Allen) Traub (= Eucharis bouchei Woodson & P.Allen)
- Urceolina candida (Planch. & Linden) Traub (= Eucharis candida Planch. & Linden)
- Urceolina castelnaeana (Baill.) Traub (= Eucharis castelnaeana (Baill.) J.F.Macbr.)
- Urceolina caucana (Meerow) Christenh. & Byng (= Eucharis caucana Meerow)
- Urceolina corynandra Ravenna (= Eucharis corynandra (Ravenna) Ravenna)
- Urceolina cuzcoensis Vargas
- Urceolina cyaneosperma (Meerow) Christenh. & Byng (= Eucharis cyaneosperma Meerow)
- Urceolina dodsonii (Meerow & Dehgan) Meerow (= Eucrosia dodsonii Meerow & Dehgan)
- Urceolina formosa (Meerow) Christenh. & Byng (= Eucharis formosa Meerow)
- Urceolina fulva Herb.
- Urceolina hartwegiana (Herb.) Traub (= Caliphruria hartwegiana Herb.)
- Urceolina latifolia (Herb.) Benth. & Hook.f.
- Urceolina lehmannii (Regel) Traub (= Eucharis lehmannii Regel)
- Urceolina microcrater Kraenzl.
- Urceolina moorei (Baker) Christenh. & Byng (= Eucharis moorei (Baker) Meerow)
- Urceolina oxyandra Ravenna (= Eucharis oxyandra (Ravenna) Ravenna)
- Urceolina plicata (Meerow) Christenh. & Byng (= Eucharis plicata Meerow)
- Urceolina robledoana (Vargas) Traub
- Urceolina ruthiana (L.Jost, Oleas & Meerow) Christenh. & Byng (= Eucharis ruthiana L.Jost, Oleas & Meerow)
- Urceolina sanderi (Baker) Traub (= Eucharis sanderi Baker)
- Urceolina subedentata (Baker) Traub (= Caliphruria subedentata Baker)
- Urceolina tenera (Baker) Traub (= Caliphruria tenera Baker)
- Urceolina ulei (Kraenzl.) Traub (= Eucharis ulei Kraenzl.)
- Urceolina urceolata (Ruiz & Pav.) Asch. & Graebn.

==== Hybrids ====
- Urceolina × butcheri (Traub) Traub (= × Calicharis butcheri (Traub) Meerow)
- Urceolina × clibranii (Mast.) Traub (= × Urceocharis clibranii Mast.)
- Urceolina × edentata (C.H.Wright) Traub (= × Urceocharis edentata C.H.Wright)
- Urceolina × grandiflora (Planch. & Linden) Traub (= Eucharis × grandiflora Planch. & Linden)
- Eucharis × stevensii W.Stevens ex N.E.Br.
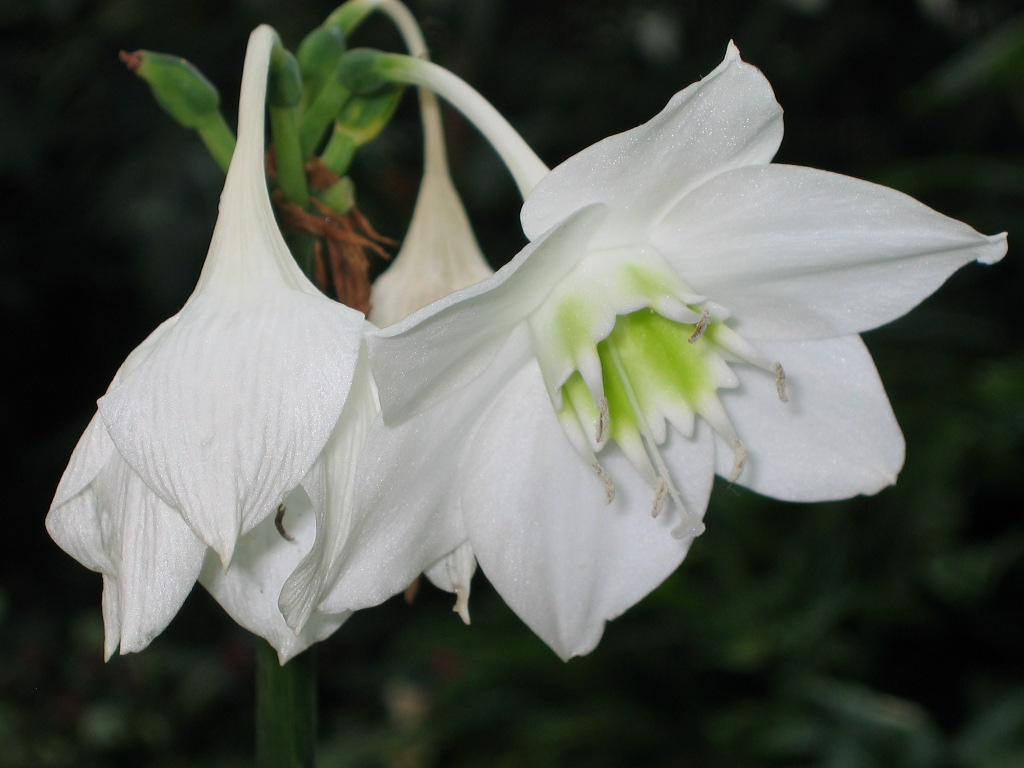
Urceolina amazonica

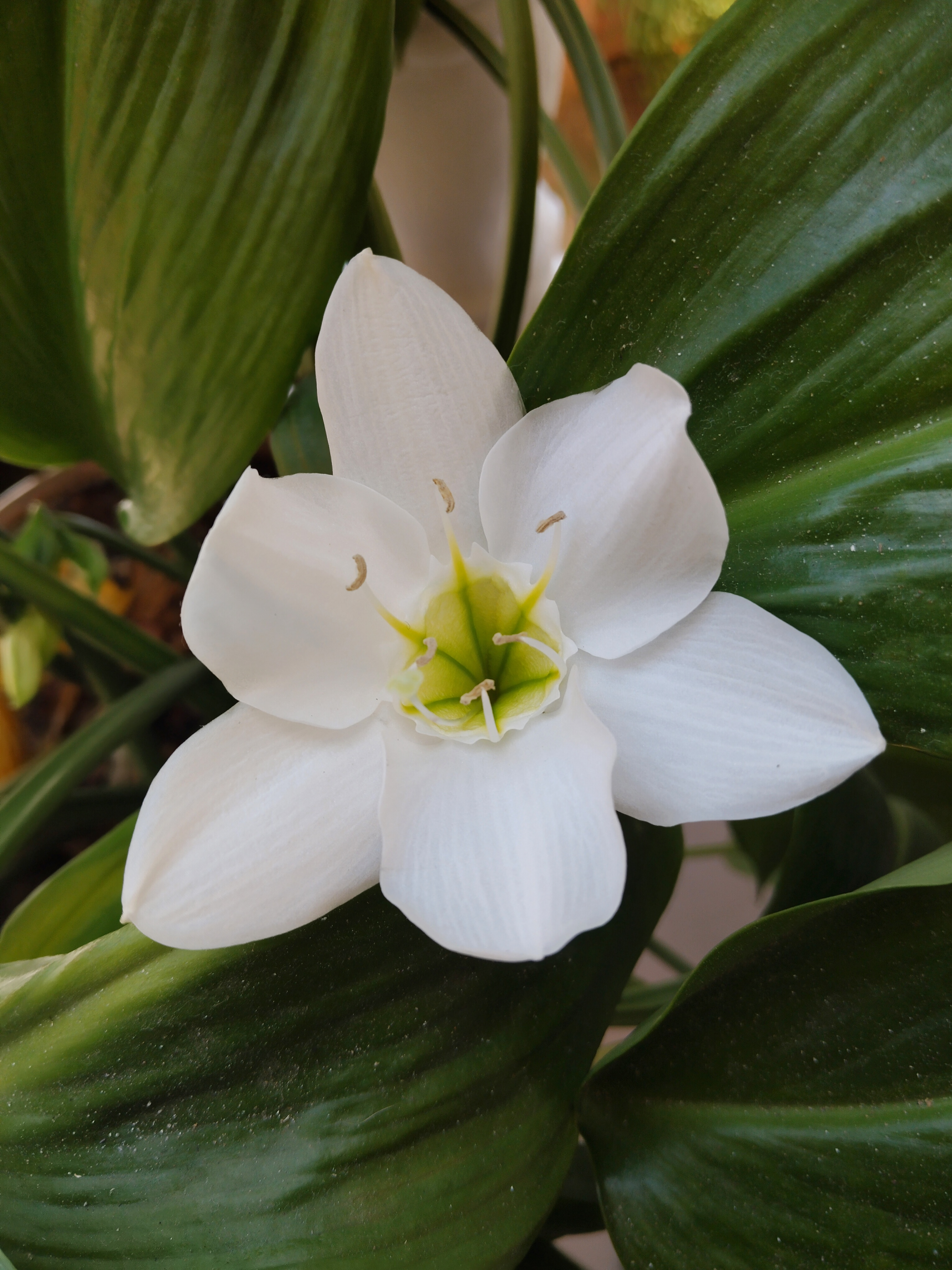
Urceolina × grandiflora

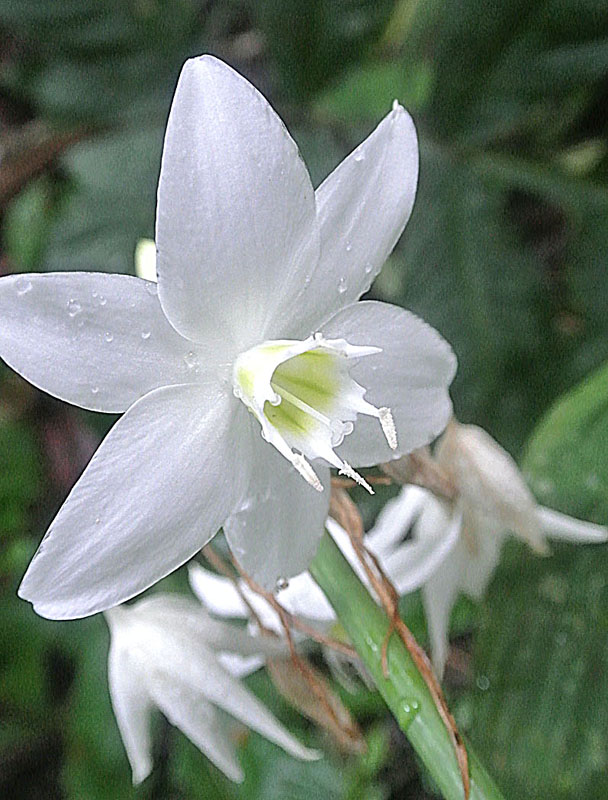
Urceolina formosa

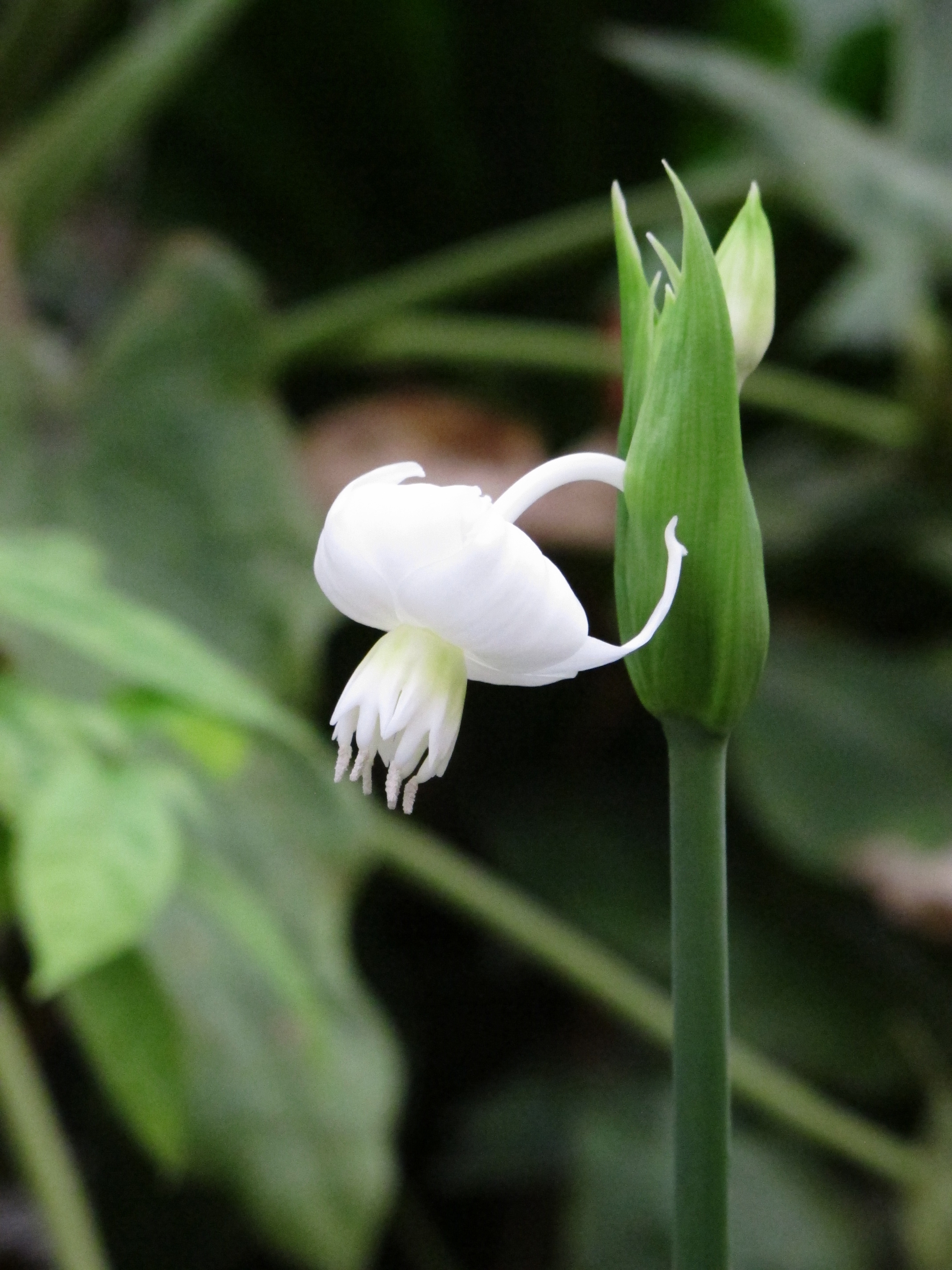
Urceolina plicata

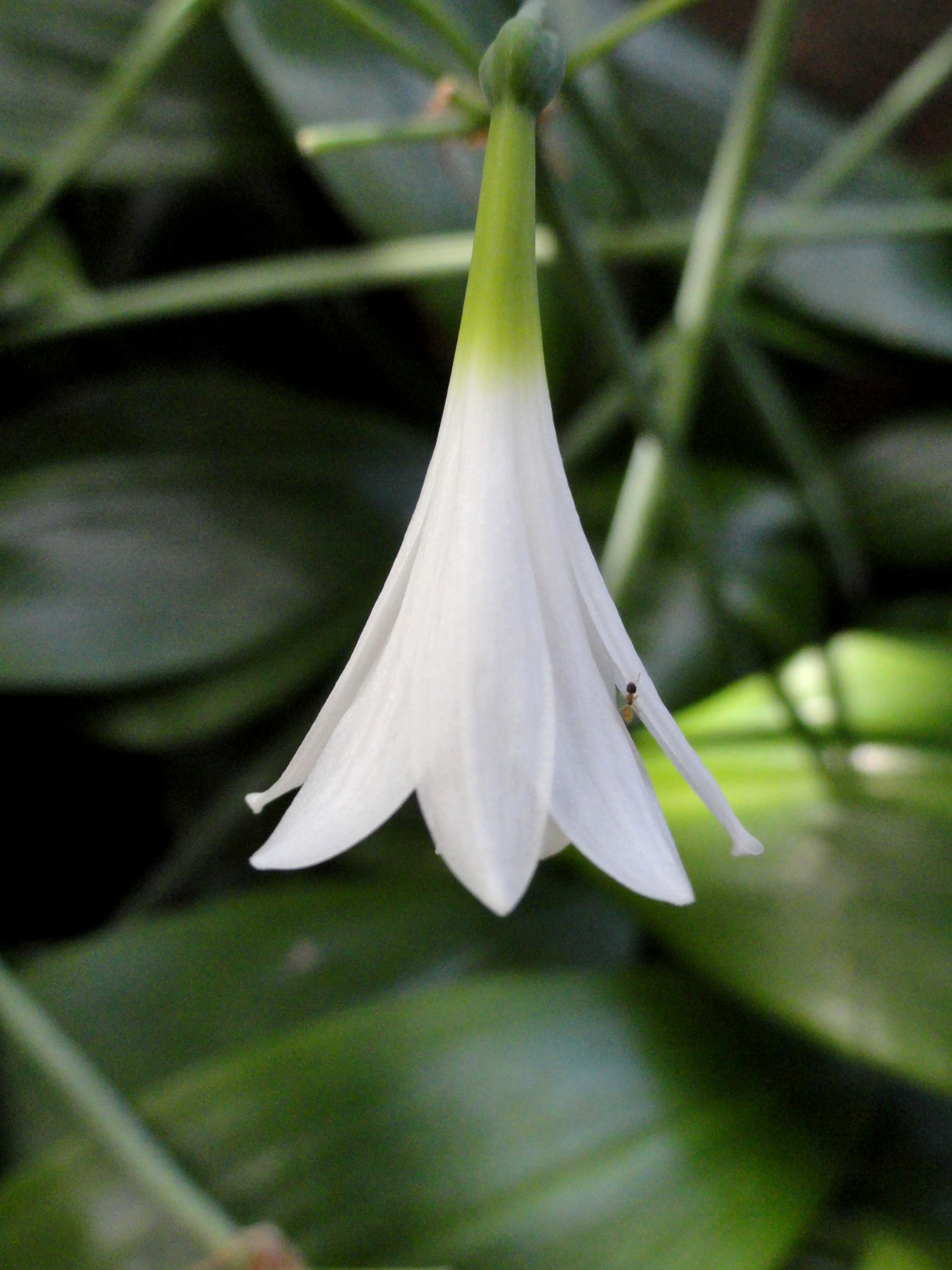
Urceolina subedentata

== Conservation status ==
Many of the species of the genus are endangered. For example, Urceolina hartwegiana and U. subedentata are threatened by extinction, and U. tenera is listed as extinct.

== Cultivation and uses ==
Urceolina amazonica, U. × grandiflora, and U. subedentata are the best-known and most generally cultivated species. It is propagated by removing the offsets, which may be done in spring, potting them singly in 15 cm pots. It requires good loamy soil, with enough sand to keep the compost open, and should have a good supply of water. A temperature of 18° to 20 °C during the night, and rising to 25 °C in the day. During summer growth is to be encouraged by repotting, but the plants should afterwards be slightly rested by removal to a night temperature of about 15 °C, water being withheld for a time, though they must not be left dry for too long, the plant being an evergreen. By the turn of the year they may again have more heat and more water, and this will probably induce them to flower. With a stock of the smaller plants to start them in succession, it is possible to have plants in flower all the year round.
