= Urceolina astrophiala =

Conservation status
- Endangered (IUCN 3.1)

Scientific classification
- Kingdom: Plantae
- Clade: Tracheophytes
- Clade: Angiosperms
- Clade: Monocots
- Order: Asparagales
- Family: Amaryllidaceae
- Subfamily: Amaryllidoideae
- Genus: Urceolina
- Species: U. astrophiala

Binomial name
- Urceolina astrophiala Ravenna

Synonyms
- Eucharis astrophiala (Ravenna) Ravenna

Species of flowering plant

Urceolina astrophiala, formerly known as Eucharis astrophiala, is a species of plant which is endemic to Ecuador. Its natural habitats are subtropical or tropical moist lowland forests and subtropical or tropical moist montane forests.

It is endangered by habitat loss.
