= Alstroemeria bilabiata =

Scientific classification
- Kingdom: Plantae
- Clade: Embryophytes
- Clade: Tracheophytes
- Clade: Spermatophytes
- Clade: Angiosperms
- Clade: Monocots
- Order: Liliales
- Family: Alstroemeriaceae
- Genus: Alstroemeria
- Species: A. bilabiata

Binomial name
- Alstroemeria bilabiata Ravenna

Species of flowering plant

Alstroemeria bilabiata is a species of flowering plant in the family Alstroemeriaceae. It is a tuberous plant native to Chile. The species was described in 1988.

== Taxonomy ==
Pierfelice Ravenna described Alstroemeria bilabiata in 1988, and published the name in Phytologia. Ravenna also collected the holotype. The species was formerly mistaken for Alstroemeria revoluta.

== Distribution ==
Alstroemeria bilabiata is native to the subtropical biome of Santiago, central Chile.

== Description ==
Alstroemeria bilabiata is tuberous, and has underground storage organs.
