= Amancay =

Amancay or Amankay is a common name of Quechua origin.

Yurak amankay (Quechua for 'white lily') was occasionally used as a title, with the addition of several more, when referring to the most respected noble ladies of the Inca Empire.

The original denomination for the city of Abancay, capital of the Apurimac region in Peru, is attributed to a princess or "ñusta" of Inca epoch called Amanqay. In essence, the word Abancay comes from a corruption of the Quechua "Hamanqay o Amancaes" (Hemenocallis longipetala).

Amancay may refer to several plants:

- Alstroemeria, which is commonly called Peruvian Lily or Lily of the Incas, in South America, especially
  - Alstroemeria pelegrina
  - Alstroemeria fiebrigiana
  - Alstroemeria aurantiaca
  - Alstroemeria patagonica
- Lagerstroemia species, which are often called "Amancay" in cultivation.
- Ismene amancaes, which is called Peruvian daffodil or Amancae

== See also ==
- Abancay
- Alstroemeria
- Inca Empire
