= Alstroemeria achirae =

Scientific classification
- Kingdom: Plantae
- Clade: Tracheophytes
- Clade: Angiosperms
- Clade: Monocots
- Order: Liliales
- Family: Alstroemeriaceae
- Genus: Alstroemeria
- Species: A. achirae

Binomial name
- Alstroemeria achirae Muñoz-Schick & Brinck

Species of flowering plant

Alstroemeria achirae is a flowering plant, a herbaceous, perennial and rhizomatous species belonging to the family Alstroemeriaceae. It is endemic to Chile, particularly the Maule Region.

== Description ==
The plant is about 12 cm tall with linear-lanceolate leaves of green or reddish-green colour with smooth or little-undulated edges. The inflorescence is yellow with pink shades towards the apex and with pink strips on the upper third. The anthers are thick and yellow.

It is a tuberous geophyte that has the ability to retreat into an underground storage organ, like a tuber. This makes the plant more resilient to adverse climactic conditions.

It flowers between December and February.

== Taxonomy ==
Alstroemeria achirae was described by Mélica Muñoz-Schick and Brinck, and published in Gayana, Botanic 57(1): 56–57, f. 2. 2000.

== Etymology ==
The plant was named Alstroemeria in honour of the Swedish botanist baron Clas Alströmer (Claus von Alstroemer) by his friend Carl Linnaeus. The epithet achirae refers to the similarity of the tepals with the flowers of the plant known as "achira" (Canna).

== Distribution ==
Its distribution is restricted to the location of the type used by Muñoz Schick and Brinck in the description in Gayana Botanic, which is the summit of Los Queñes mountain, commune of Teno, Region of the Maule, Chile. It has also been found in the valley of the Teno River, from Romeral to Los Queñes.
