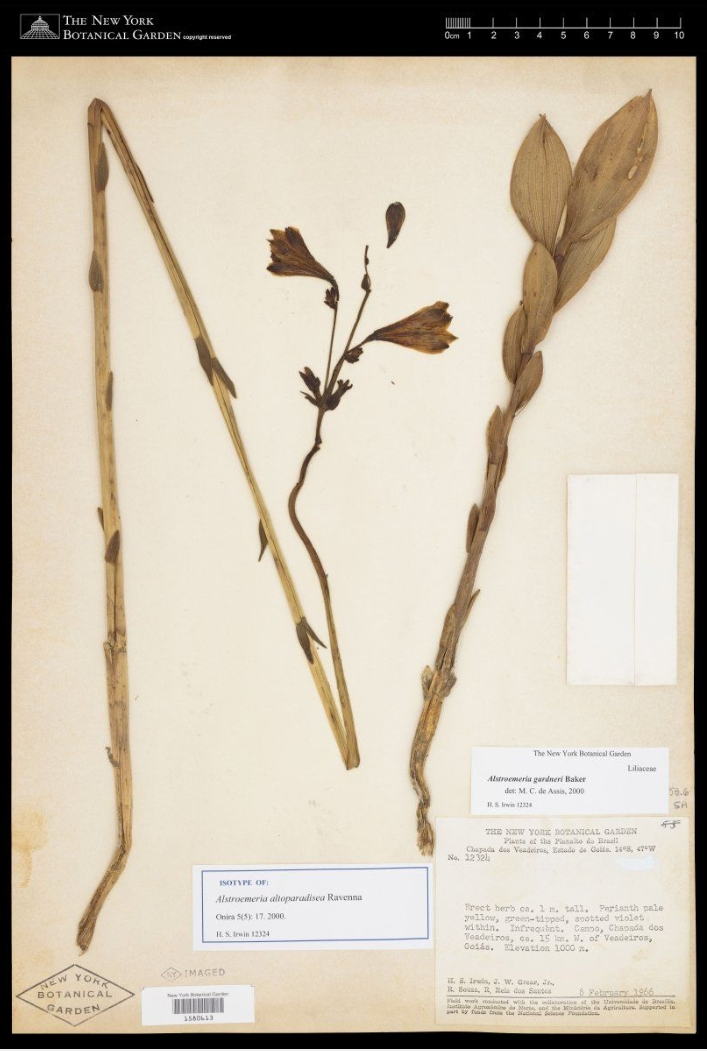

Scientific classification
- Kingdom: Plantae
- Clade: Embryophytes
- Clade: Tracheophytes
- Clade: Spermatophytes
- Clade: Angiosperms
- Clade: Monocots
- Order: Liliales
- Family: Alstroemeriaceae
- Genus: Alstroemeria
- Species: A. altoparadisea

Binomial name
- Alstroemeria altoparadisea Ravenna

= Alstroemeria altoparadisea =

Species of flowering plant

Alstroemeria altoparadisea is a species of flowering plant in the family Alstroemeriaceae. It is native to Brazil, and was described in 2000.

== Taxonomy ==
The species was described by Pierfelice Ravenna in 2000. The type material was collected in Goiás, Brazil, in 1966.

== Distribution ==
Alstroemeria altoparadisea is native to the seasonally dry tropical biome of Goiás, Brazil.

== Description ==
Alstroemeria altoparadisea is tuberous, and has underground storage organs.
