= Alstroemeria annapolina =

Scientific classification
- Kingdom: Plantae
- Clade: Embryophytes
- Clade: Tracheophytes
- Clade: Angiosperms
- Clade: Monocots
- Order: Liliales
- Family: Alstroemeriaceae
- Genus: Alstroemeria
- Species: A. annapolina

Binomial name
- Alstroemeria annapolina Ravenna

Species of flowering plant

Alstroemeria annapolina is a species of flowering plant in the family Alstroemeriaceae. It is native to Brazil, and was described in 2000.

== Taxonomy ==
The species was described by Pierfelice Ravenna in 2000.

== Distribution ==
Alstroemeria annapolina is native to the seasonally dry tropical biome of Goiás, west-central Brazil.

== Description ==
Alstroemeria annapolina has underground storage organs.
