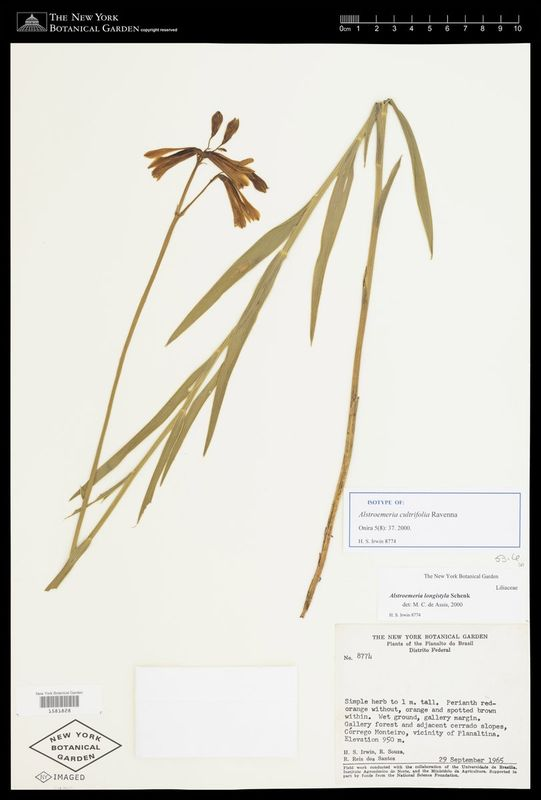

Scientific classification
- Kingdom: Plantae
- Clade: Embryophytes
- Clade: Tracheophytes
- Clade: Spermatophytes
- Clade: Angiosperms
- Clade: Monocots
- Order: Liliales
- Family: Alstroemeriaceae
- Genus: Alstroemeria
- Species: A. cultrifolia

Binomial name
- Alstroemeria cultrifolia Ravenna

= Alstroemeria cultrifolia =

Species of flowering plant

Alstroemeria cultrifolia is a species of flowering plant in the family Alstroemeriaceae. It is native to Brazil, and was described in 2000.

== Taxonomy ==
Alstroemeria cultrifolia was described by Pierfelice Ravenna in 2000.

== Distribution ==
Alstroemeria cultrifolia is native to the seasonally dry tropical biome of west-central Brazil.

== Description ==
Alstroemeria cultrifolia has underground storage organs.
