= Alstroemeria caiaponica =

Scientific classification
- Kingdom: Plantae
- Clade: Embryophytes
- Clade: Tracheophytes
- Clade: Spermatophytes
- Clade: Angiosperms
- Clade: Monocots
- Order: Liliales
- Family: Alstroemeriaceae
- Genus: Alstroemeria
- Species: A. caiaponica

Binomial name
- Alstroemeria caiaponica Ravenna

Species of flowering plant

Alstroemeria caiaponica is a species of flowering plant in the family Alstroemeriaceae. It is a tuberous plant with red flowers, and capsule fruits. It was described by Pierfelice Ravenna in 2000.

Alstroemeria caiaponica is a tuberous herb with underground storage organs. The leaves are papery, narrow to elliptical, and arranged alternately. The inflorescence is a cyme. The flowers are bell-shaped and red. The inner tepals are spotted, and the outer tepals are not spotted. The fruit is a loculicidal capsule. The seeds are spherical, and have small protuberances.

The species is endemic to the seasonally dry tropical biome of Goiás and Mato Grosso, Brazil.
