= Alstroemeria arnicana =

Scientific classification
- Kingdom: Plantae
- Clade: Embryophytes
- Clade: Tracheophytes
- Clade: Spermatophytes
- Clade: Angiosperms
- Clade: Monocots
- Order: Liliales
- Family: Alstroemeriaceae
- Genus: Alstroemeria
- Species: A. arnicana

Binomial name
- Alstroemeria arnicana Ravenna

Species of flowering plant

Alstroemeria arnicana is a species of flowering plant in the family Alstroemeriaceae. It is a tuberous plant native to Brazil. The species was described in 2000.

== Taxonomy ==
Alstroemeria arnicana was described by Pierfelice Ravenna in 2000. The holotype was collected from Caldas Novas in 1976.

== Distribution ==
The species is native to the seasonally dry tropical biome of Goiás, west-central Brazil.

== Description ==
Alstroemeria arnicana is tuberous and has underground storage organs.
