= Alstroemeria bahiensis =

Scientific classification
- Kingdom: Plantae
- Clade: Tracheophytes
- Clade: Angiosperms
- Clade: Monocots
- Order: Liliales
- Family: Alstroemeriaceae
- Genus: Alstroemeria
- Species: A. bahiensis

Binomial name
- Alstroemeria bahiensis Ravenna

Species of flowering plant

Alstroemeria bahiensis is a species of flowering plant in the family Alstroemeriaceae. It is native to Brazil, and was described in 2000.

== Taxonomy ==
The species was described by Pierfelice Ravenna in 2000.

== Distribution ==
Alstroemeria bahiensis is native to the seasonally dry tropical biome of Bahia, Brazil.

== Description ==
Alstroemeria bahiensis has underground tubers.
