= Alstroemeria discolor =

Scientific classification
- Kingdom: Plantae
- Clade: Tracheophytes
- Clade: Angiosperms
- Clade: Monocots
- Order: Liliales
- Family: Alstroemeriaceae
- Genus: Alstroemeria
- Species: A. discolor

Binomial name
- Alstroemeria discolor Ravenna

Species of flowering plant

Alstroemeria discolor is a species of monocotyledonous plants from Alstroemeria genus, Alstroemeriaceae family, described by Pierfelice Ravenna. According to Catalogue of Life Alstroemeria discolor does not have any known subspecies.
