= Alstroemeria aulica =

Scientific classification
- Kingdom: Plantae
- Clade: Tracheophytes
- Clade: Angiosperms
- Clade: Monocots
- Order: Liliales
- Family: Alstroemeriaceae
- Genus: Alstroemeria
- Species: A. aulica

Binomial name
- Alstroemeria aulica Ravenna

Species of flowering plant

Alstroemeria aulica is a species of flowering plant in the family Alstroemeriaceae. It is native to Chile, and was described in 2000.

== Taxonomy ==
The species was described by Pierfelice Ravenna in 2000.

== Distribution ==
Alstroemeria aulica is native to the subtropial biome of the Valparaíso Region, in central Chile.

== Description ==
Alstroemeria aulica has underground tubers.
