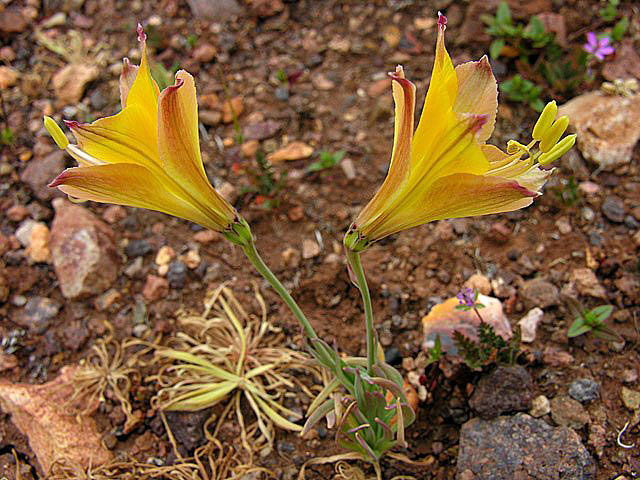

Scientific classification
- Kingdom: Plantae
- Clade: Tracheophytes
- Clade: Angiosperms
- Clade: Monocots
- Order: Liliales
- Family: Alstroemeriaceae
- Genus: Alstroemeria
- Species: A. kingii

Binomial name
- Alstroemeria kingii Phil.

= Alstroemeria kingii =

Species of plant

Alstroemeria kingii is a species of flowering plant in the family Alstroemeriaceae, native to north Chile.
