= Bomarea angustifolia =

Conservation status
- Critically Endangered (IUCN 3.1)

Scientific classification
- Kingdom: Plantae
- Clade: Tracheophytes
- Clade: Angiosperms
- Clade: Monocots
- Order: Liliales
- Family: Alstroemeriaceae
- Genus: Bomarea
- Species: B. angustifolia

Binomial name
- Bomarea angustifolia Benth.

Species of flowering plant

Bomarea angustifolia is a species of flowering plant in the family Alstroemeriaceae. It is endemic to Ecuador, where it is known from a single collection made during the first half of the 19th century. It is not clear exactly where the specimen was collected, but it may have been near Loja.
