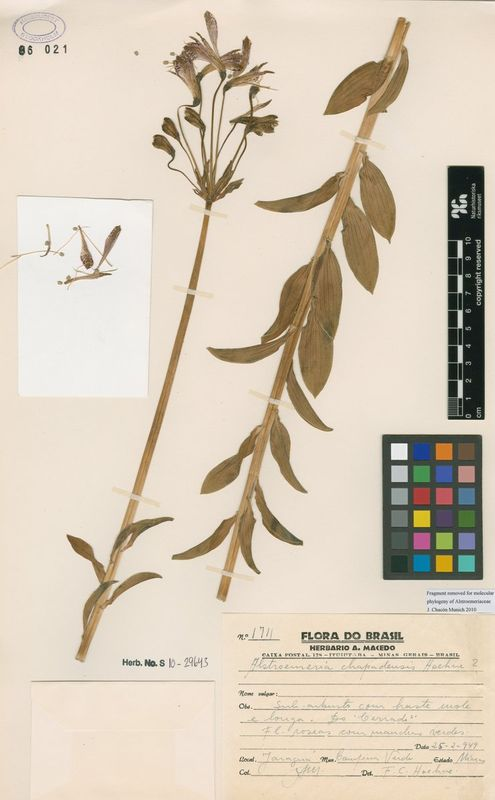

Scientific classification
- Kingdom: Plantae
- Clade: Embryophytes
- Clade: Tracheophytes
- Clade: Spermatophytes
- Clade: Angiosperms
- Clade: Monocots
- Order: Liliales
- Family: Alstroemeriaceae
- Genus: Alstroemeria
- Species: A. chapadensis

Binomial name
- Alstroemeria chapadensis Hoehne

= Alstroemeria chapadensis =

Species of flowering plant

Alstroemeria chapadensis is a species of flowering plant in the family Alstroemeriaceae. It has bell-shaped yellowish flowers, and is endemic to Brazil. The species was described in 1915.

== Taxonomy ==
The species was described by Frederico Carlos Hoehne in 1915.

== Distribution ==
Alstroemeria chapadensis is native to the seasonally dry tropical biome of Mato Grosso, Brazil. It is endemic to Brazil.

== Description ==
Alstroemeria chapadensis has underground storage organs. The inflorescence is a cyme. The flowers are bell-shaped, and yellowish. The internal tepals are spotted. The fruit is a loculicidal capsule. The seeds are spherical, and covered with small protrusions.
