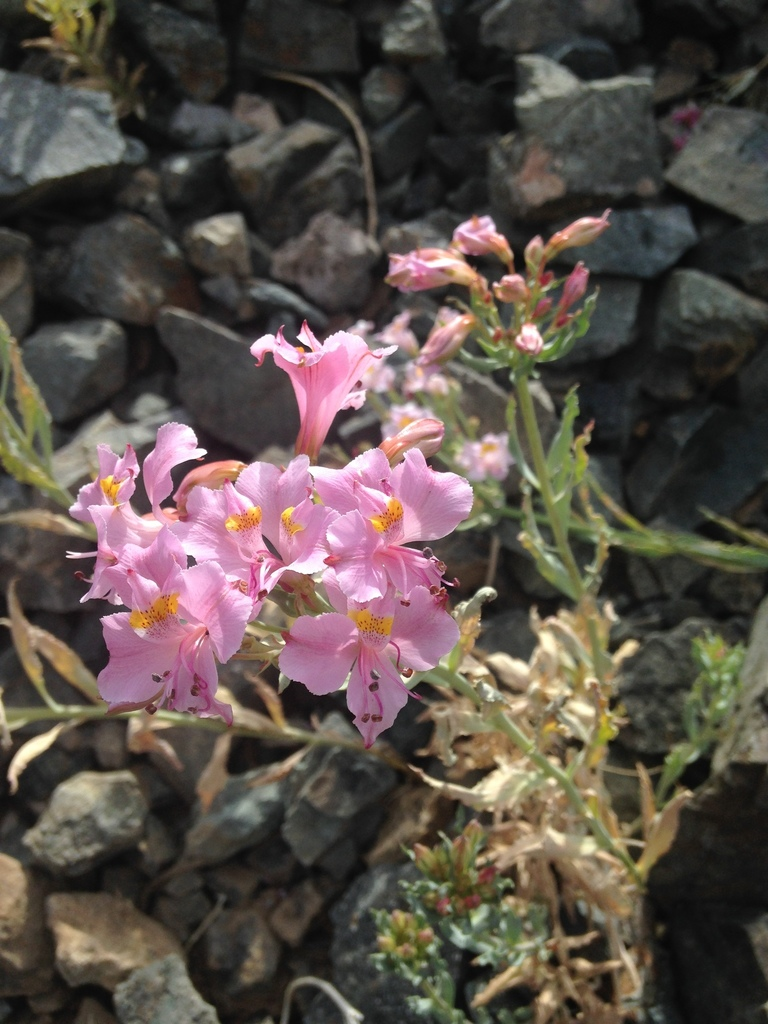

Scientific classification
- Kingdom: Plantae
- Clade: Embryophytes
- Clade: Tracheophytes
- Clade: Spermatophytes
- Clade: Angiosperms
- Clade: Monocots
- Order: Liliales
- Family: Alstroemeriaceae
- Genus: Alstroemeria
- Species: A. crispata

Binomial name
- Alstroemeria crispata Phil.

= Alstroemeria crispata =

Species of flowering plant

Alstroemeria crispata is a species of flowering plant in the family Alstroemeriaceae. It is native to Chile, and was described in 1858.

== Taxonomy ==
The species was described by Rodolfo Amando Philippi in 1858.

== Distribution ==
Alstroemeria crispata grows in the deserts and dry shrublands of northern Chile.

== Description ==
Alstroemeria crispata has underground storage organs.
