= Alstroemeria orchidioides =

Scientific classification
- Kingdom: Plantae
- Clade: Tracheophytes
- Clade: Angiosperms
- Clade: Monocots
- Order: Liliales
- Family: Alstroemeriaceae
- Genus: Alstroemeria
- Species: A. orchidioides

Binomial name
- Alstroemeria orchidioides Meerow, Tombolato and F.K.Mey.

Synonyms
- Alstroemeria umbrosa Ravenna

Species of flowering plant

Alstroemeria orchidioides is a species of monocotyledonous plant belonging to the genus Alstroemeria in the family Alstroemeriaceae, described by Meerow, Tombolato and Friedrich Karl Meyer.
