= Alstroemeria amazonica =

Scientific classification
- Kingdom: Plantae
- Clade: Embryophytes
- Clade: Tracheophytes
- Clade: Spermatophytes
- Clade: Angiosperms
- Clade: Monocots
- Order: Liliales
- Family: Alstroemeriaceae
- Genus: Alstroemeria
- Species: A. amazonica

Binomial name
- Alstroemeria amazonica Ducke

Species of flowering plant

Alstroemeria amazonica is a species of flowering plant in the family Alstroemeriaceae. It is native to Brazil and Venezuela, and was described in 1915.

Alstroemeria amazonica has bell-shaped, red and green flowers. The fruits are capsules.

== Taxonomy ==
The species was described by Adolpho Ducke in 1915.

== Distribution ==
Alstroemeria amazonica is native to Pará, Brazil, and Bolívar, Venezuela. It grows on or around rocks, and in tropical rainforests.

== Description ==
Alstroemeria amazonica is tuberous, and has underground storage organs.

The inflorescence is an umbel-shaped cyme. The flowers are bell-shaped, hanging, and symmetrical. The flowers are red and green in colour. The internal tepals are marked with spots, though the external tepals are not.

The fruits are capsules, which split in a loculicidal pattern when mature. The seeds are spherical, and have small protuberances.
