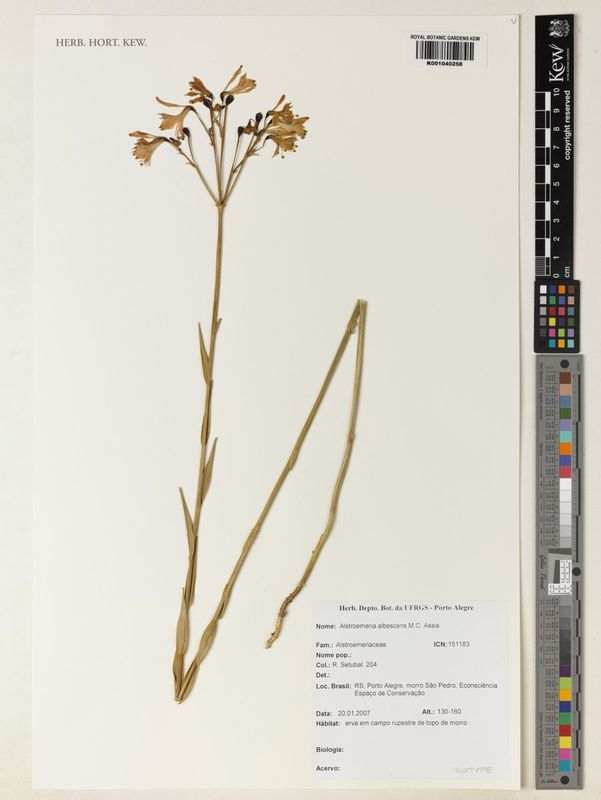

Scientific classification
- Kingdom: Plantae
- Clade: Embryophytes
- Clade: Tracheophytes
- Clade: Angiosperms
- Clade: Monocots
- Order: Liliales
- Family: Alstroemeriaceae
- Genus: Alstroemeria
- Species: A. albescens

Binomial name
- Alstroemeria albescens M.C.Assis

= Alstroemeria albescens =

Species of flowering plant

Alstroemeria albescens is a species of flowering plant in the family Alstroemeriaceae. It is a perennial with leathery leaves, bell-shaped, white to lilac flowers, and capsule fruits. The species is endemic to Brazil, and was described in 2009.

== Taxonomy ==
The species was described by Marta Camargo de Assis in 2009. The type specimen was collected in 2007.

== Distribution ==
Alstroemeria albescens is native to the subtropical biome of Rio Grande do Sul, southern Brazil. It grows on rocky outcrops, at elevations of 130–160 metres (430–520 ft).

== Description ==
Alstroemeria albescens is a tuberous, perennial herb that grows up to 70 centimetres (2.3 ft) high. The leaves are leathery, linear, 1.5–11.5 centimetres (0.59–4.53 in) long, and 4–6 millimetres (0.16–0.24 in) long.

The inflorescence is an umbel-like cyme with three to ten flowers. The flower stems are 2–2.5 centimetres (0.79–0.98 in) long. The bracts are 8–9 millimetres (0.31–0.35 in) long, and papery. The flowers are spreading, bell-shaped, and lack a scent. The flowers are 2.2–3 centimetres (0.87–1.18 in) long, and white to lilac in colour. The flowers have six tepals. The outer tepals are unpatterned, and spoon-shaped. The inner tepals have ruby-coloured spots. The flowers have six stamens. Flowering specimens have been collected from January to March.

The fruits are capsules, measuring 1.3–1.5 centimetres (0.51–0.59 in) long, and 0.7–1 centimetre (0.28–0.39 in) wide.

== Etymology ==
Alstroemeria albescens is named for albescens, the Latin word for "whitish" or "becoming white". The name refers to the colour of the flowers.
