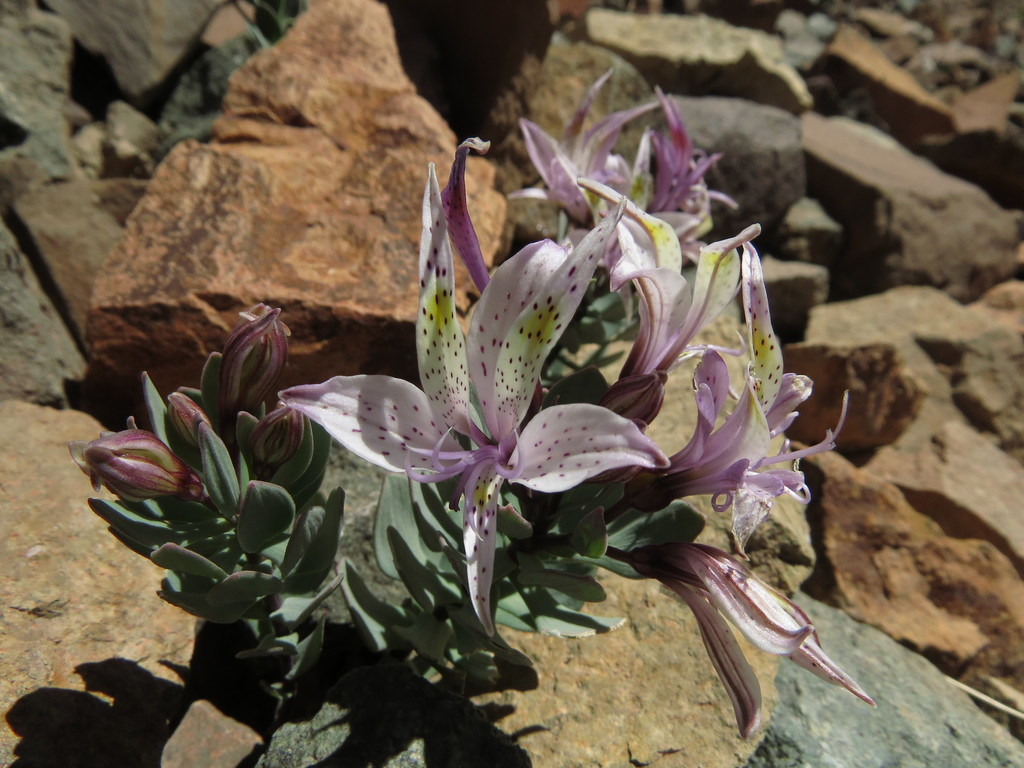

Scientific classification
- Kingdom: Plantae
- Clade: Embryophytes
- Clade: Tracheophytes
- Clade: Angiosperms
- Clade: Monocots
- Order: Liliales
- Family: Alstroemeriaceae
- Genus: Alstroemeria
- Species: A. andina

Binomial name
- Alstroemeria andina Phil.

Subspecies
- Alstroemeria andina subsp. andina; Alstroemeria andina subsp. venustula (Phil.) Ehr.Bayer

= Alstroemeria andina =

Species of flowering plant

Alstroemeria andina is a species of flowering plant in the family Alstroemeriaceae. The species is native to Argentina and Chile, and was described in 1858.

== Taxonomy ==
The species was described by Rodolfo Amando Philippi in 1858.

Two subspecies are recognised:

- Alstroemeria andina subsp. andina - native to northern Chile
- Alstroemeria andina subsp. venustula (Phil.) Ehr.Bayer - Native to northern Chile and Argentina

== Distribution ==
Alstroemeria andina is native to the subtropical biome of northern Chile and San Juan, Argentina.

== Description ==
Alstroemeria andina has underground storage organs.
