= Alstroemeria pygmaea =

Scientific classification
- Kingdom: Plantae
- Clade: Tracheophytes
- Clade: Angiosperms
- Clade: Monocots
- Order: Liliales
- Family: Alstroemeriaceae
- Genus: Alstroemeria
- Species: A. pygmaea

Binomial name
- Alstroemeria pygmaea Herb.

Synonyms
- Schickendantzia pygmaea (Herb.) Speg.; Schickendantzia hieronymi Pax; Alstroemeria ligtu var. pygmaea (Herb.) Kuntze

Species of flowering plant

Alstroemeria pygmaea, also known as the peruvian lily, is a species of small monocotyledonous plant in the genus Alstroemeria, and in the family Alstroemeriaceae. A. pygaea was described by William Herbert in 1837. The species leaves are a gray-green color with one deep yellow flowers. The leaves stems are narrow and are twisted at the base with thick tuberous roots.

== Distribution ==
A. pygmaea is found in South America, from Peru to NW Argentina. They live at an elevation of 3500 meters to 4420 meters.
