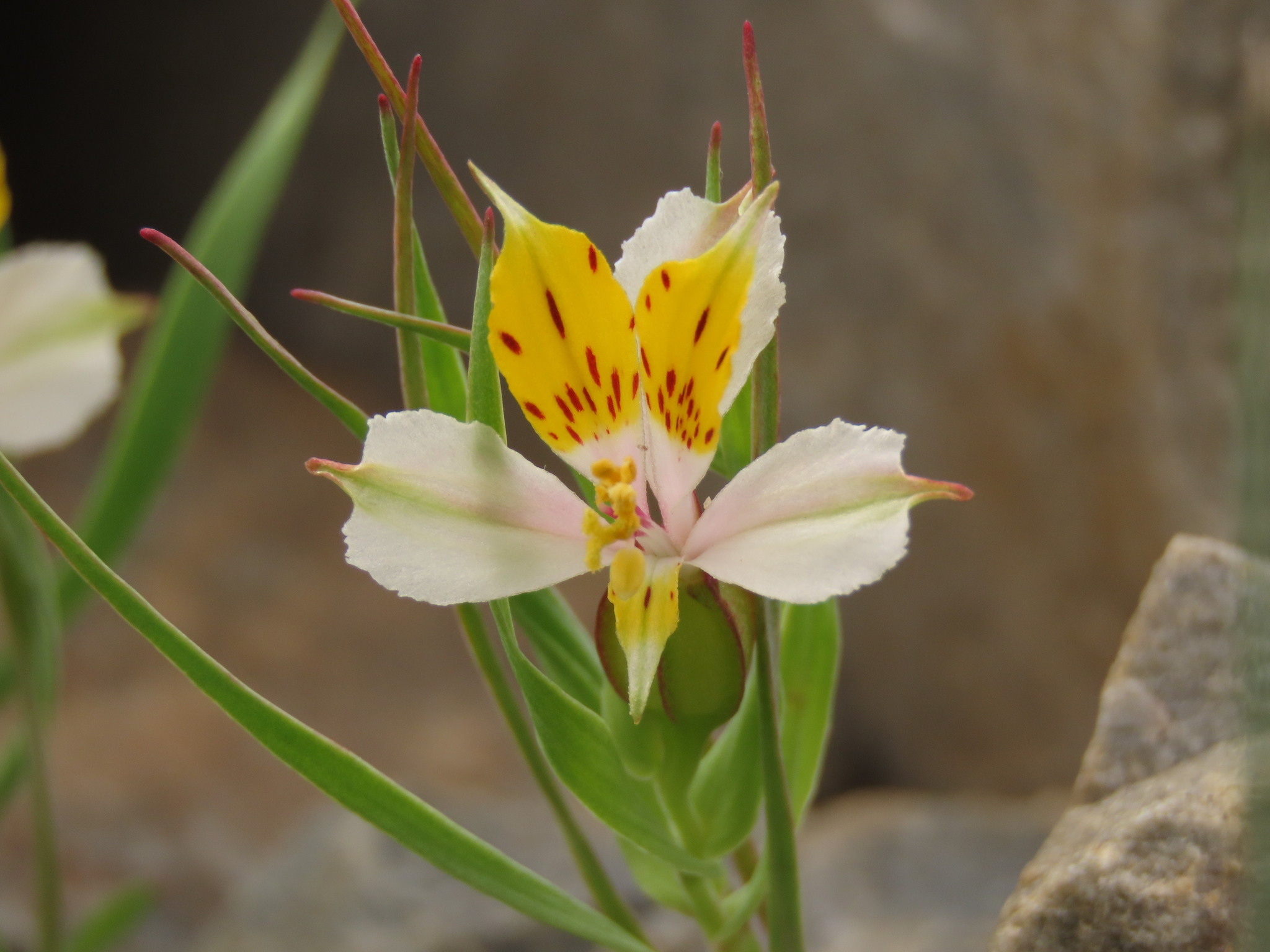

Scientific classification
- Kingdom: Plantae
- Clade: Tracheophytes
- Clade: Angiosperms
- Clade: Monocots
- Order: Liliales
- Family: Alstroemeriaceae
- Genus: Alstroemeria
- Species: A. graminea

Binomial name
- Alstroemeria graminea Phil.

= Alstroemeria graminea =

Species of plant

Alstroemeria graminea is a species of flowering plant in the family Alstroemeriaceae. It is an annual herb endemic to Chile, inhabiting the northern regions of Antofagasta and Atacama.
