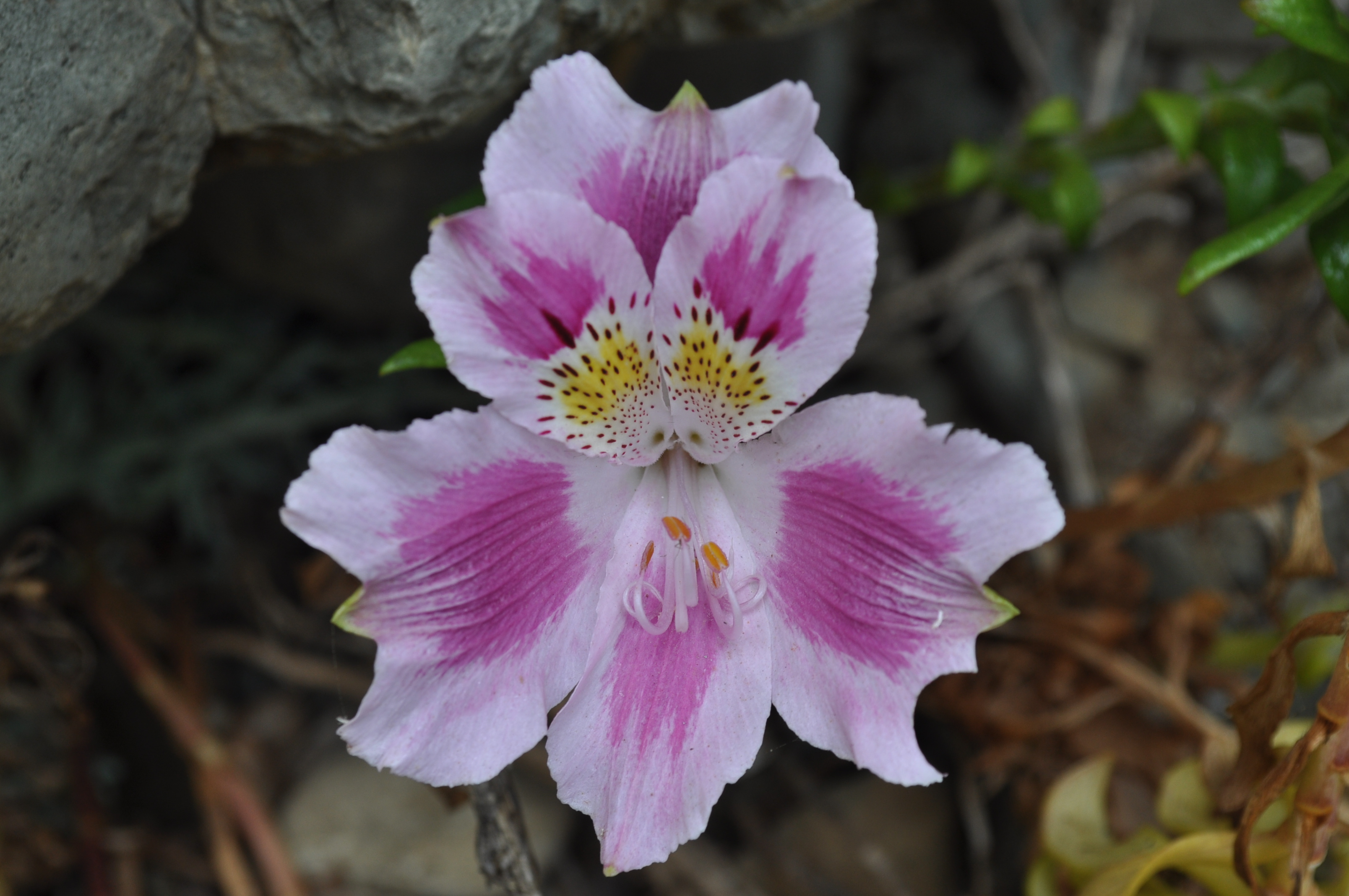

Scientific classification
- Kingdom: Plantae
- Clade: Tracheophytes
- Clade: Angiosperms
- Clade: Monocots
- Order: Liliales
- Family: Alstroemeriaceae
- Genus: Alstroemeria
- Species: A. pelegrina

Binomial name
- Alstroemeria pelegrina L.

Synonyms
- Alstroemeria amoena Salisb.; Alstroemeria peregrina Ruiz et Pav.; Alstroemeria pulchella L.f.

= Alstroemeria pelegrina =

Species of flowering plant in Inca-lily family

Alstroemeria pelegrina, the Peruvian lily, is a species of flowering plant in the large genus Alstroemeria of the family Alstroemeriaceae (Inca-lilies), part of the monocot order Liliales. It is the type-species of that genus, originally described by Linnaeus in 1762 as one of three species of Alstroemeria. It is a herbaceous rhizomatous perennial endemic to Chile.

== Description ==
The plant stems reach 20 to 60 cm in height, glabrous (smooth) in the upper part and scaly in the lower. The rhizomes are cylindrical, branched and elongated with roots that are long and thin. From the upper third of the stem arise leaves that are a vivid green in colour and arranged spirally and twisted so that their tips are on the side. The flowers are large and showy, the tepals being 4.5–5.5 cm in length, being an intense pink color with a purple centre. The stamens have purplish anthers. The ovary is glabrous, with 6 prominent ribs. The seeds are brow and spherical.

== Taxonomy ==
The genus Alstroemeria was originally described by Johan Peter Falk and his thesis supervisor Carl Linnaeus in his 1762 dissertation Planta Alströmeria, with three species, including A. pelegrina. Consequently Linnaeus bears the botanical authority (L.). These species were then incorporated into the second edition of Linnaeus' Species plantarum (1763). As the first species described, it is the type species of the genus.

== Distribution and habitat ==
Alstroemeria pelegrina is endemic to the Norte Chico and central regions of Chile, but it is also found in Peru. It is found between Los Vilos (Choapa Province, Coquimbo Region) and Punta Curaumilla (Valparaíso Province, Valparaíso Region) to the south, a Mediterranean littoral climate. A large population is found in the coastal region between Los Molles (Valparaíso) and Pichidangui, near Los Vilos, where it has the local name mariposa de Los Molles (Los Molles butterfly). The preferred habitat is in rocks and coastal cliffs at the level of high tide.

== Ecology ==
Alstroemeria pelegrina blooms annually between October and December, with fruit appearing after the end of October.

== Conservation ==
Alstroemeria pelegrina is among 9 species endemic to the area classified as vulnerable. They are threatened by tourism and development, with new homes and roads traversing their natural habitat.

== Cultivation ==
Alstroemeria pelegrina was the first species of Alstroemeria to be taken to Europe and cultivated there (1744). Hardy to USDA zones 10a–11. In the United States it is grown in California, Louisiana, Texas and Florida.

== Bibliography ==
- Bayer, Ehrentraud (1987). Die Gattung Alstroemeria in Chile., see also Die Gattung Alstroemeria in Chile
- Linnaeus; Falk, Johan Peter (1762). Planta Alströmeria. Holmiae: Laurentii Salvii., published in Amoenitates Academicae 6: 247–262 1763
- Linnaeus, Carl (1763). "Alstroemeria". Species Plantarum: exhibentes plantas rite cognitas, ad genera relatas, cum differentiis specificis, nominibus trivialibus, synonymis selectis, locis natalibus, secundum systema sexuale digestas. Vol. 1 (2nd. ed.). Stockholm: Impensis Laurentii Salvii. pp. 461–462. see Species Plantarum
- Schick, Mélica Muñoz; Muñoz, Andrés Moreira (2003). "Alstroemeria pelegrina L.". Alstroemerias de Chile: diversidad, distribución y conservación. Taller La Era. p. 68ff. ISBN 9789568201029.
- Lund, Rosemarie; Teillier, Sebastián (December 2012). "Flora vascular de Los Molles, Región de Valparaíso, Chile". Chloris Chilensis. 15 (2).
- "Alstroemeria pelegrina L.". Tropicos. Missouri Botanical Garden. 2020.
- "Alstroemeria pelegrina". Dave's Garden. 2020.
- POWO (2020). "Alstroemeria pelegrina L." Plants of the World Online. Royal Botanic Gardens, Kew.
- PFAF (2020). "Alstroemeria pelegrina - L.".
- WFO (2019). "Alstroemeria pelegrina L." World Flora Online.
