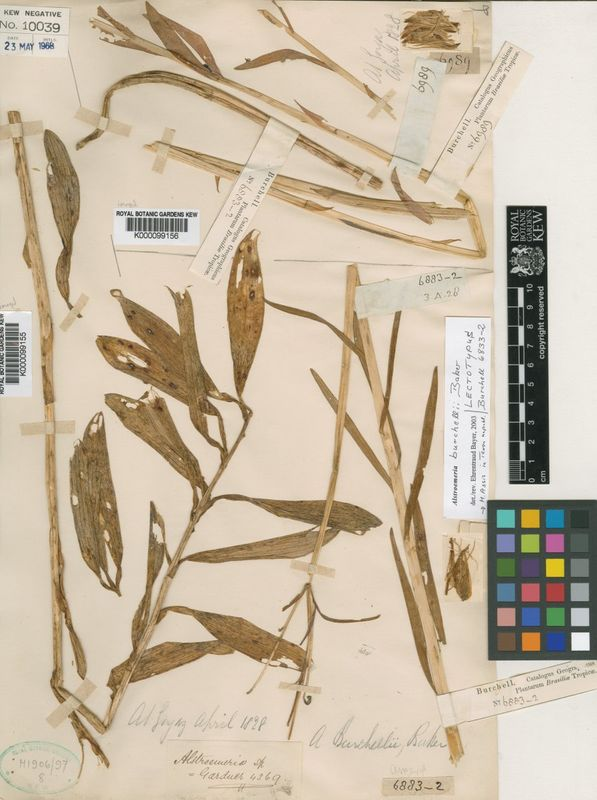

Scientific classification
- Kingdom: Plantae
- Clade: Embryophytes
- Clade: Tracheophytes
- Clade: Spermatophytes
- Clade: Angiosperms
- Clade: Monocots
- Order: Liliales
- Family: Alstroemeriaceae
- Genus: Alstroemeria
- Species: A. burchellii

Binomial name
- Alstroemeria burchellii Baker

= Alstroemeria burchellii =

Species of flowering plant

Alstroemeria burchellii is a species of flowering plant in the family Alstroemeriaceae. It is a tuberous plant with capsule fruits, and spherical seeds. The species is native to Goiás, and was described in 1877.

== Taxonomy ==
The species was described by John Gilbert Baker in 1877.

== Distribution ==
Alstroemeria burchellii is native to the seasonally dry tropical biome of Goiás, west-central Brazil.

== Description ==
Alstroemeria burchellii is a tuberous plant with underground storage organs. The flowering stems are straight, around 3 feet (91 cm) long, and have a few leaves, which are 2–3.5 inches (5.1–8.9 cm) long. The non-flowering stems are around 2 feet (61 cm) long, and have around twenty leaves, which are 3–4 inches (7.6–10.2 cm) long.

The inflorescence is an umbel with three to four rays, which are 2–3 inches (5.1–7.6 cm) long. The perianth is pale, and has purple spots. The flower is bell-shaped, yellowish, and spotted.

The fruit is a loculicidal capsule. The seeds are spherical, and have small protuberances.
