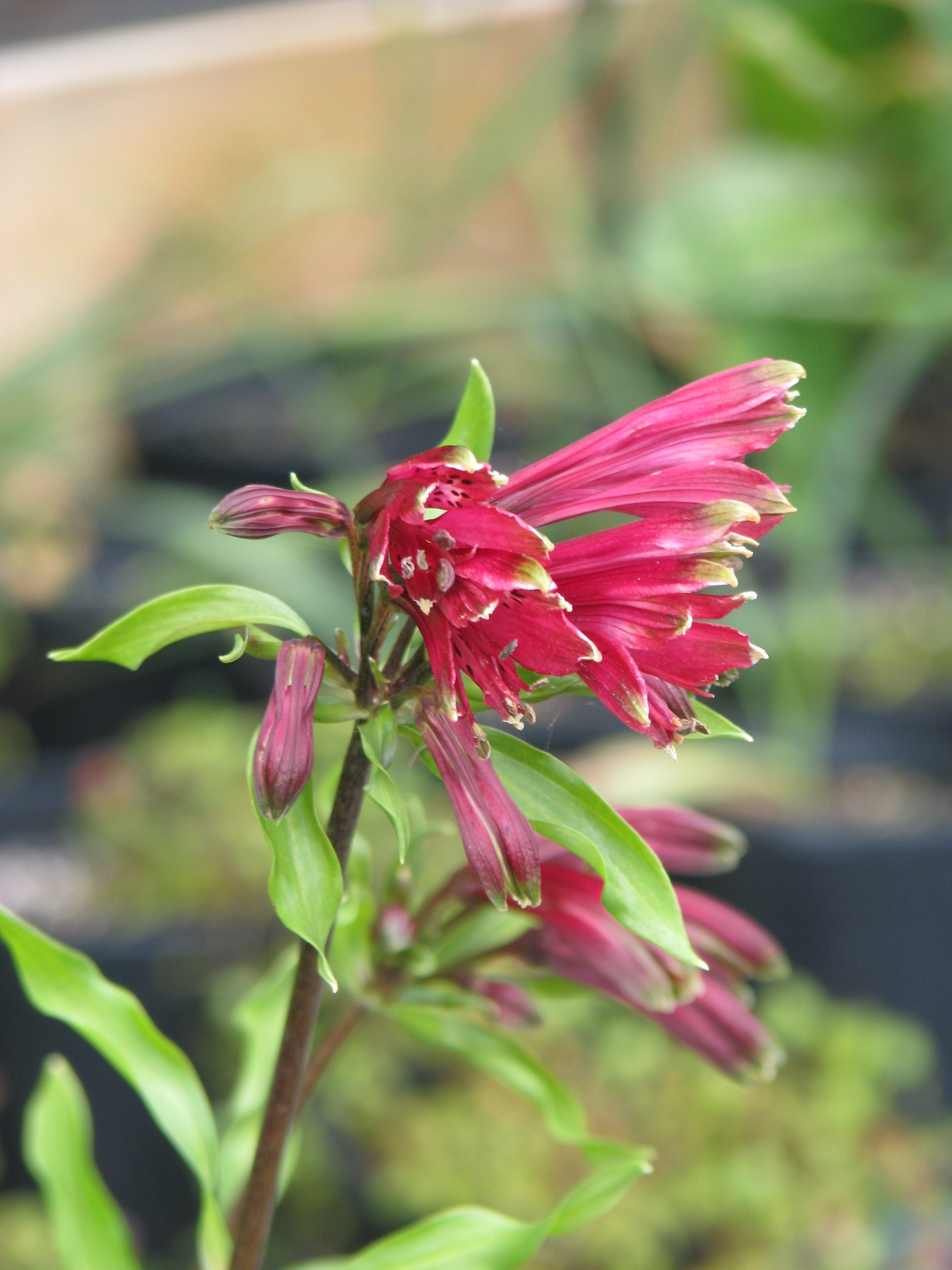

Scientific classification
- Kingdom: Plantae
- Clade: Tracheophytes
- Clade: Angiosperms
- Clade: Monocots
- Order: Liliales
- Family: Alstroemeriaceae
- Genus: Alstroemeria
- Species: A. brasiliensis

Binomial name
- Alstroemeria brasiliensis Spreng.

Synonyms
- Alstroemeria tigrina Seub.; Alstroemeria zamioides Baker

= Alstroemeria brasiliensis =

Species of flowering plant

Alstroemeria brasiliensis is a species of flowering plant in the family Alstroemeriaceae. It is a tuberous plant with red, yellow, and green flowers. The species is native to Brazil, and was described in 1825.

== Taxonomy ==
The species was described by Kurt Polycarp Joachim Sprengel in 1825. It is a parent of the hybrid Alstroemeria × zebrina.

== Distribution ==
Alstroemeria brasiliensis is native to the seasonally dry tropical biome of west-central and south-east Brazil (Goiás, Mato Grosso, and Minas Gerais).

== Description ==
Alstroemeria brasiliensis has underground tubers. The leaves are papery, and linear, lanceolate, or elliptical.

The inflorescence is an umbel-shaped cyme. The flowers are tube or bell-shaped, and red, yellow, or green in colour. The internal tepals are spotted, and the external tepals are not.

The fruit is a loculicidal capsule. The seeds are spherical.
