= Alstroemeria amabilis =

Scientific classification
- Kingdom: Plantae
- Clade: Embryophytes
- Clade: Tracheophytes
- Clade: Angiosperms
- Clade: Monocots
- Order: Liliales
- Family: Alstroemeriaceae
- Genus: Alstroemeria
- Species: A. amabilis

Binomial name
- Alstroemeria amabilis M.C.Assis

Species of flowering plant

Alstroemeria amabilis is a species of flowering plant in the family Alstroemeriaceae. It has reddish-orange flowers, and capsule fruits. The species is native to Brazil, and was described in 2003.

== Taxonomy ==
The species was described by Marta Camargo de Assis in 2003.

== Distribution ==
Alstroemeria amabilis is native to the subtropical biome of southern Brazil.

== Description ==
Alstroemeria amabilis is a herb with underground storage organs.

The inflorescence is an umbel-shaped cyme with bracts. The flowers are bell-shaped and reddish-orange. The internal tepals are spotted.

The fruit is a loculicidal capsule. The seeds are spherical, and covered with small protuberances.
