= Alstroemeria bakeri =

Scientific classification
- Kingdom: Plantae
- Clade: Tracheophytes
- Clade: Angiosperms
- Clade: Monocots
- Order: Liliales
- Family: Alstroemeriaceae
- Genus: Alstroemeria
- Species: A. bakeri

Binomial name
- Alstroemeria bakeri Pax

Species of flowering plant

Alstroemeria bakeri is a species of flowering plant in the family Alstroemeriaceae. It is native to Argentina, and was described in 1889.

== Taxonomy ==
The species was described by Ferdinand Albin Pax in 1889.

== Distribution ==
Alstroemeria bakeri is native to the subtropical biome of Catamarca Province, north-west Argentina.

== Description ==
Alstroemeria bakeri has underground tubers.
