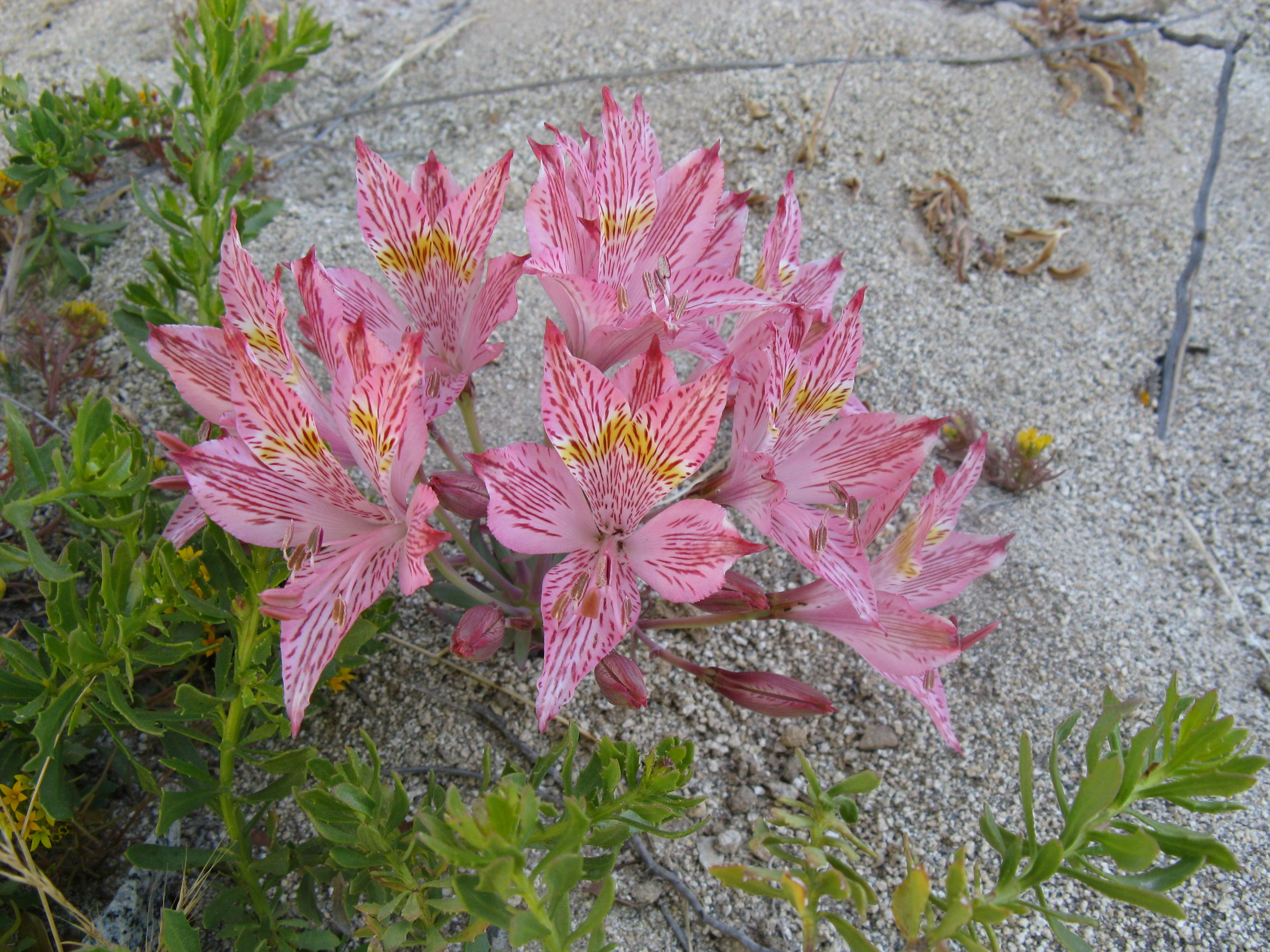

Scientific classification
- Kingdom: Plantae
- Clade: Tracheophytes
- Clade: Angiosperms
- Clade: Monocots
- Order: Liliales
- Family: Alstroemeriaceae
- Genus: Alstroemeria
- Species: A. garaventae

Binomial name
- Alstroemeria garaventae Ehr.Bayer

= Alstroemeria garaventae =

Species of plant

Alstroemeria garaventae is a species of flowering plant in the family Alstroemeriaceae, native to Central Chile. Alstroemeria garaventae subsp. longaviensis is a subspecies of it found at Achibueno and Ancoa valleys and characterized by tepals and inflorescence leaves of smaller size than the usual subspecies. Alstroemeria garaventae subsp. garaventae, the main subspecies, grows at altitudes ranging from 1200 to 2000 meters above sea level. The subspecies Alstroemeria garaventae subsp. longaviensis grows at a much lower range, from 240 to 390, and does so at locations more than 100 km south of the distribution of the main subspecies.
