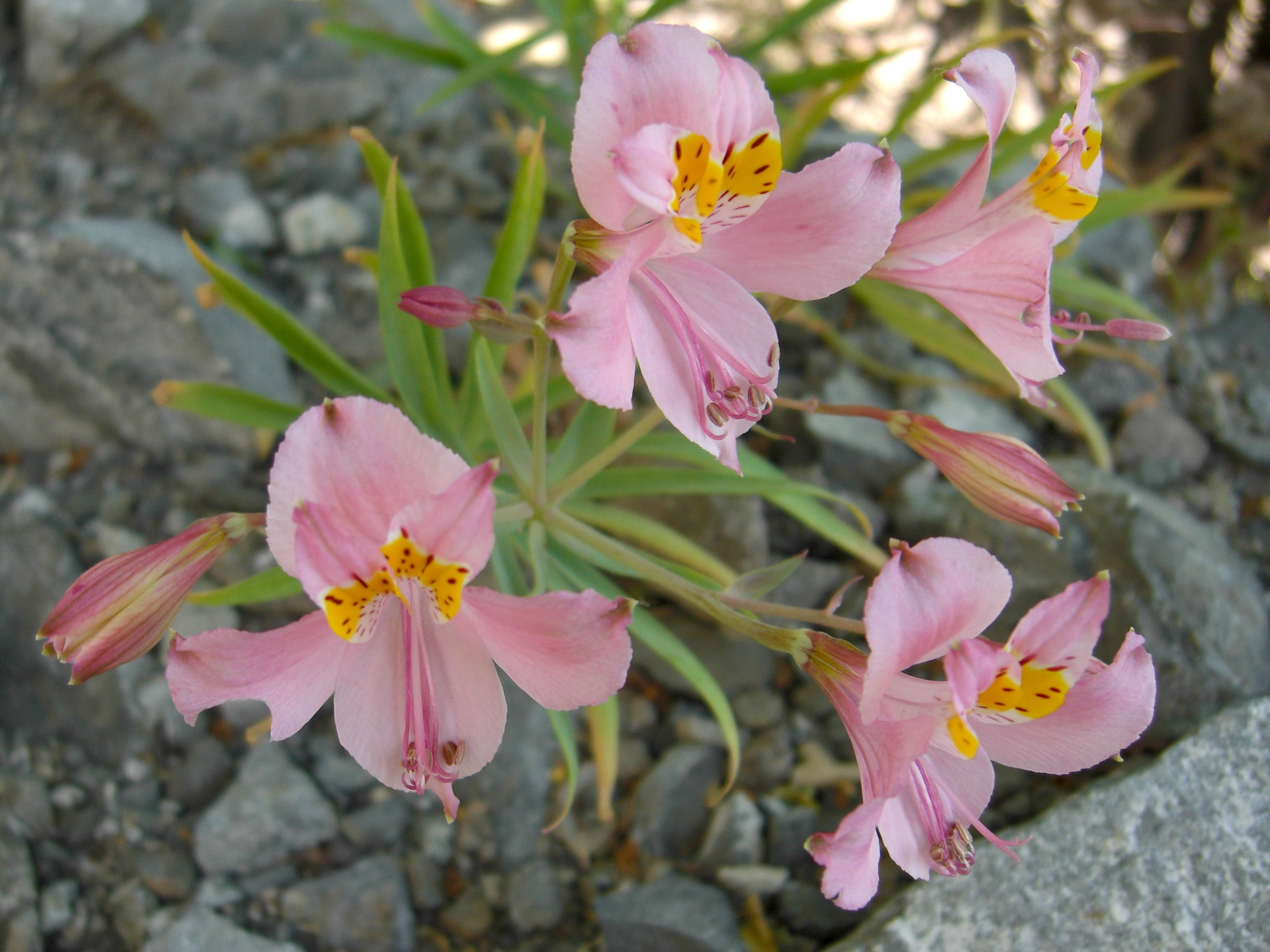
- Alstroemeria angustifolia subsp. angustifolia

Scientific classification
- Kingdom: Plantae
- Clade: Embryophytes
- Clade: Tracheophytes
- Clade: Spermatophytes
- Clade: Angiosperms
- Clade: Monocots
- Order: Liliales
- Family: Alstroemeriaceae
- Genus: Alstroemeria
- Species: A. angustifolia

Binomial name
- Alstroemeria angustifolia Herb.

Subspecies
- Alstroemeria angustifolia subsp. angustifolia; Alstroemeria angustifolia subsp. velutina Ehr.Bayer

= Alstroemeria angustifolia =

Species of flowering plant

Alstroemeria angustifolia is a species of flowering plant in the family Alstroemeriaceae. It is a tuberous plant native to Chile. There are two subspecies.

== Taxonomy ==
Alstroemeria angustifolia was described by William Herbert in 1837.

There are two recognised subspecies:

- Alstroemeria angustifolia subsp. angustifolia - native to northern and central Chile
- Alstroemeria angustifolia subsp. velutina Ehr.Bayer - native to central Chile

== Distribution ==
Alstroemeria angustifolia is native to the subtropical biome of northern and central Chile.

== Description ==
Alstroemeria angustifolia is tuberous, and has underground storage organs.
