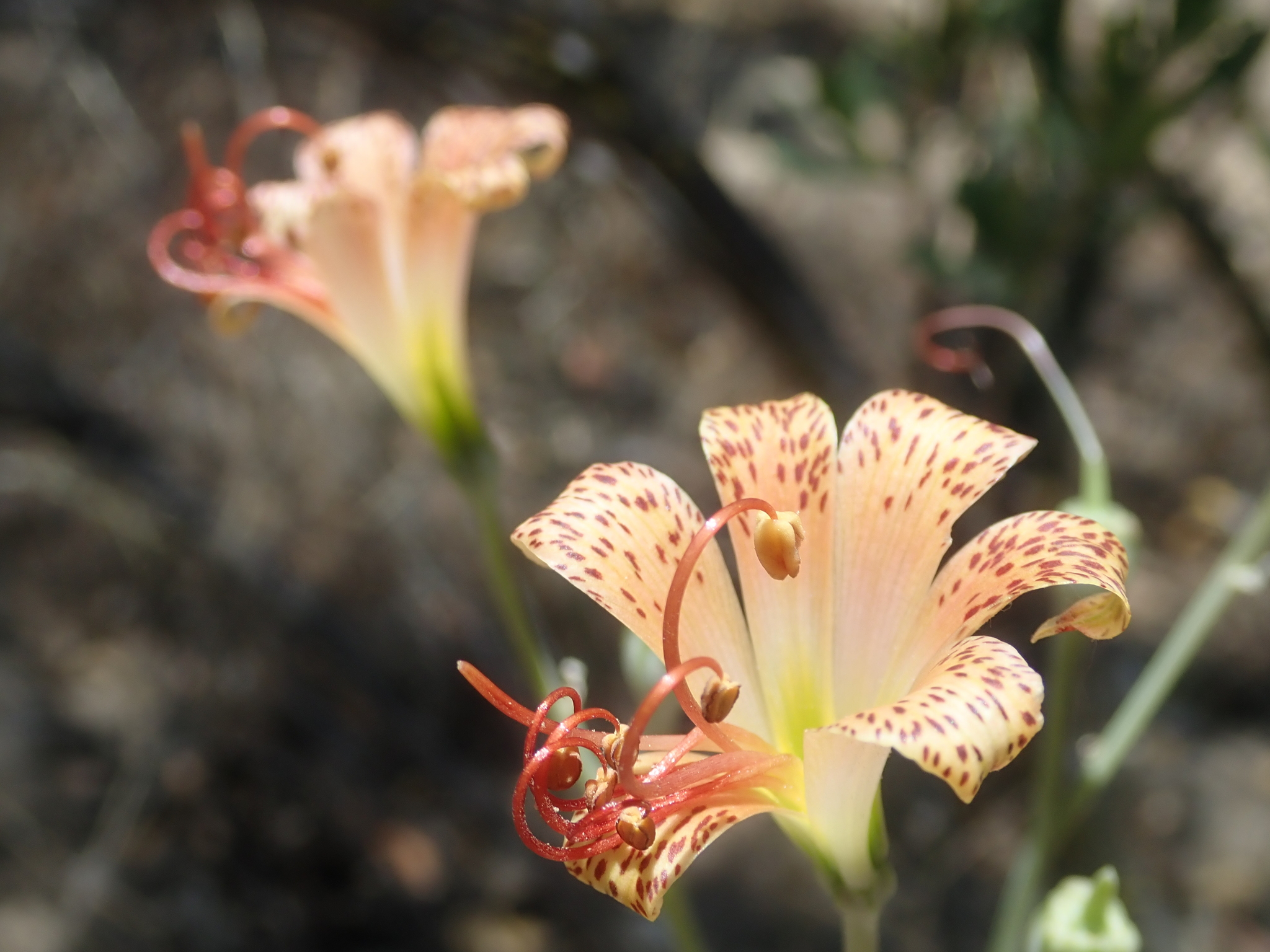

Scientific classification
- Kingdom: Plantae
- Clade: Tracheophytes
- Clade: Angiosperms
- Clade: Monocots
- Order: Liliales
- Family: Alstroemeriaceae
- Genus: Alstroemeria
- Species: A. versicolor

Binomial name
- Alstroemeria versicolor Ruiz & Pav.

Synonyms
- Alstroemeria meyeniana Schauer; Alstroemeria sotoana Phil.; Alstroemeria tigrina Phil.

= Alstroemeria versicolor =

Species of plant

Alstroemeria versicolor is a species of plant in the family Alstroemeriaceae. It is a perennial herb endemic to Chile, where it is distributed between the Santiago Metropolitan and Araucanía regions.
