= Alstroemeria capixaba =

Scientific classification
- Kingdom: Plantae
- Clade: Embryophytes
- Clade: Tracheophytes
- Clade: Spermatophytes
- Clade: Angiosperms
- Clade: Monocots
- Order: Liliales
- Family: Alstroemeriaceae
- Genus: Alstroemeria
- Species: A. capixaba

Binomial name
- Alstroemeria capixaba M.C.Assis

Species of flowering plant

Alstroemeria capixaba is a species of flowering plant in the family Alstroemeriaceae. It is a tuberous herb with spotted red flowers. The species is native to Brazil, and was described in 2003.

== Taxonomy ==
The species was described by Marta Camargo de Assis in 2003.

== Distribution ==
Alstroemeria capixaba is native to the seasonally dry tropical biome of south-east Brazil (Espírito Santo and Minas Gerais). It is endemic to Brazil. The species grows in tropical rainforests.

== Description ==
Alstroemeria capixaba is a tuberous herb. The leaves are in an inverted position because the stem is twisted 180 degrees.

The inflorescence is umbelliform, and has bracts. The flowers are reddish, in three parts, and bell-shaped. Both the internal and external tepals have spots. The fruit is a capsule. The seeds are spherical, and have small protuberances.
