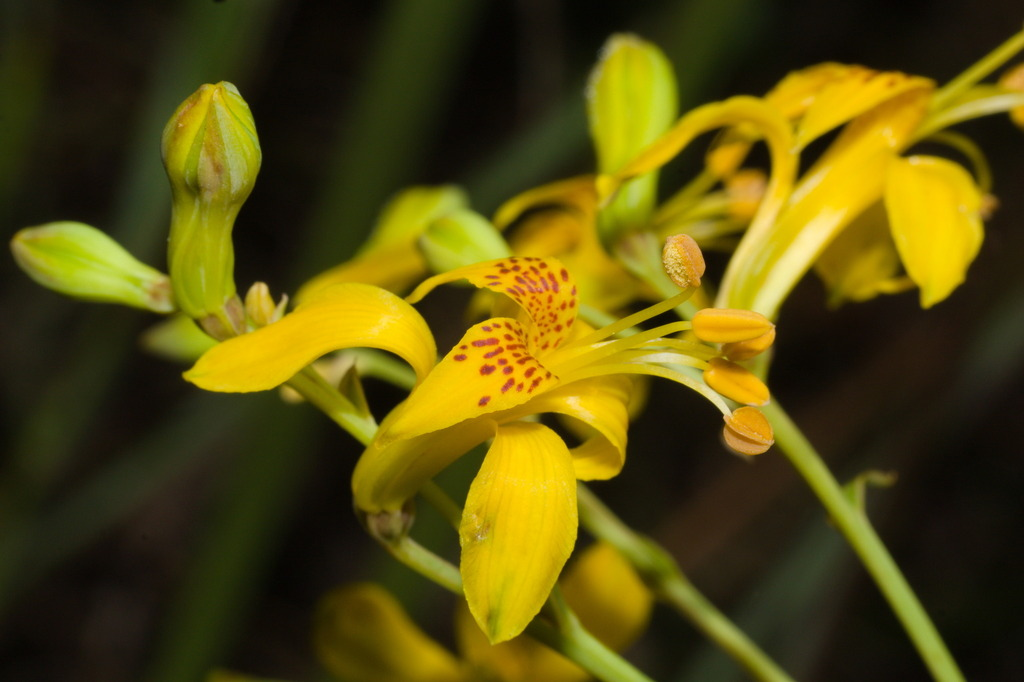

Scientific classification
- Kingdom: Plantae
- Clade: Embryophytes
- Clade: Tracheophytes
- Clade: Spermatophytes
- Clade: Angiosperms
- Clade: Monocots
- Order: Liliales
- Family: Alstroemeriaceae
- Genus: Alstroemeria
- Species: A. apertiflora

Binomial name
- Alstroemeria apertiflora Baker

Synonyms
- Alstroemeria apertiflora f. lucidior Ravenna

= Alstroemeria apertiflora =

Species of flowering plant

Alstroemeria apertiflora is a species of flowering plant in the family Alstroemeriaceae. It is a herb with bell-shaped yellow flowers, and papery to leathery leaves. The species is native to Argentina, Brazil, and Paraguay, and was described in 1888.

== Taxonomy ==
Alstroemeria apertiflora was described by John Gilbert Baker in 1888.

== Distribution ==
The species is native to the subtropical biome of north-eastern Argentina (Misiones Province), south, south-east, and west-central Brazil, and Paraguay.

== Description ==
Alstroemeria apertiflora is a herb, with a stem over 3 feet (91 cm) high. It has underground storage organs. The rhizomes are sympodial.

The leaves are papery or leathery in texture. They are up to 2 inches (5.1 cm) long.

The inflorescence is an umbel. The flowers are yellow to red, bell-shaped, and have three parts. The internal tepals have spots. The perianth is around 1 inch (2.5 cm) long.

The fruit is a capsule that undergoes loculicidal dehiscence. The seeds are spherical, and have small protuberances.
