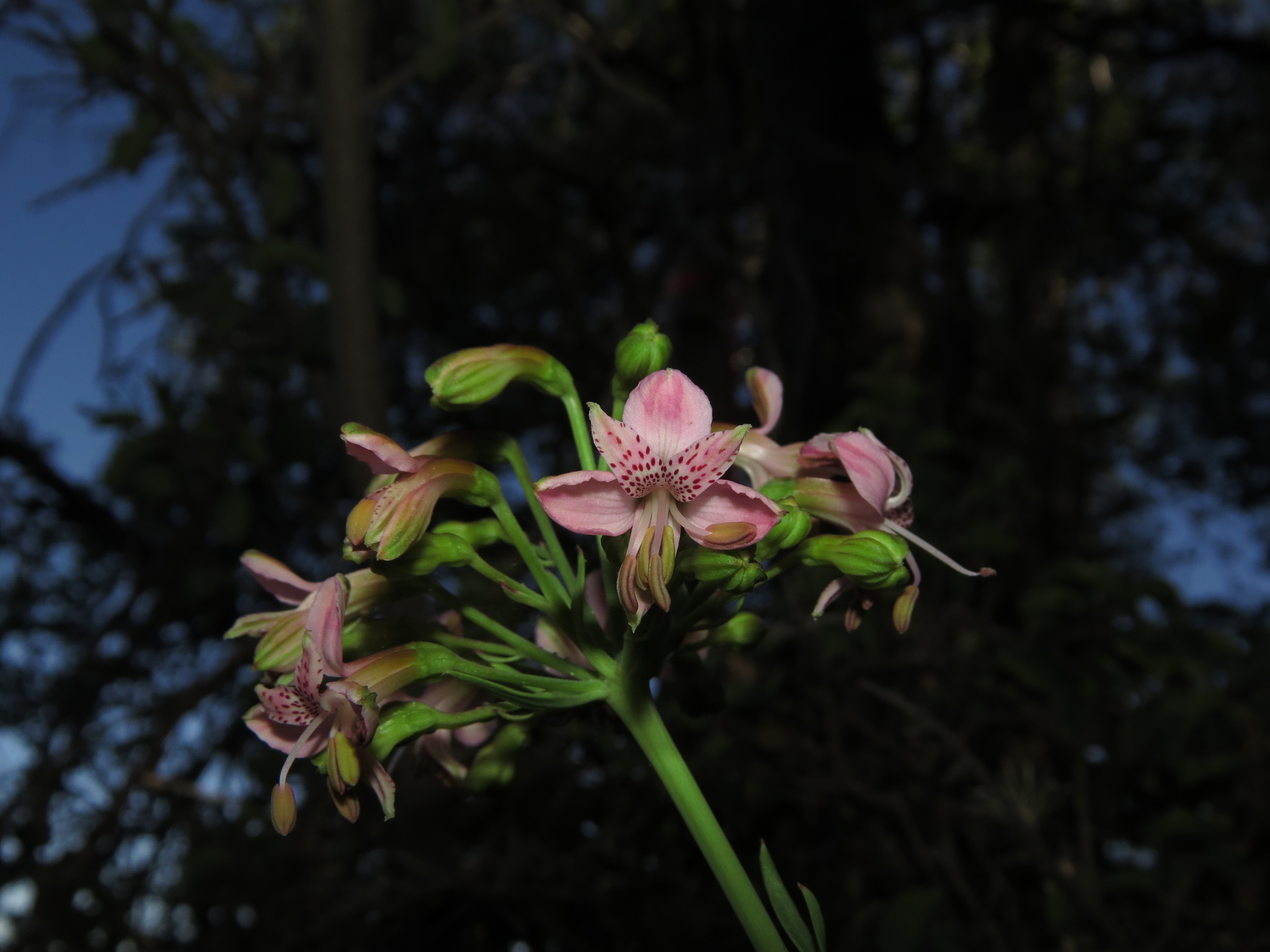

Scientific classification
- Kingdom: Plantae
- Clade: Tracheophytes
- Clade: Angiosperms
- Clade: Monocots
- Order: Liliales
- Family: Alstroemeriaceae
- Genus: Alstroemeria
- Species: A. revoluta

Binomial name
- Alstroemeria revoluta Ruiz & Pav.

Synonyms
- Alstroemeria herbertiana M.Roem.; Alstroemeria inconspicua Phil.; Alstroemeria reflexa M.Roem.

= Alstroemeria revoluta =

Species of plant

Alstroemeria revoluta is a species of plant in the family Alstroemeriaceae. It is a perennial herb endemic to Chile, where it is distributed between the Valparaíso and Araucanía regions.
