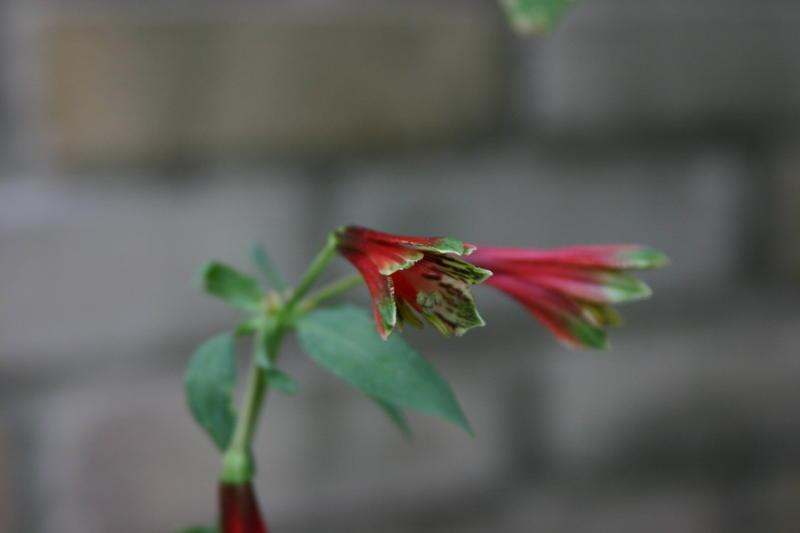

Scientific classification
- Kingdom: Plantae
- Clade: Embryophytes
- Clade: Tracheophytes
- Clade: Spermatophytes
- Clade: Angiosperms
- Clade: Monocots
- Order: Liliales
- Family: Alstroemeriaceae
- Genus: Alstroemeria
- Species: A. psittacina

Binomial name
- Alstroemeria psittacina Lehm.

Synonyms
- Alstroemeria pulchella hort., misapplied; Lilavia psittacina (Lehm.) Raf.; Alstroemeria banksiana M.Roem.; Alstroemeria psittacina var. longipedunculata Regel; Alstroemeria hassleriana Baker; Alstroemeria atrorubra Ravenna

= Alstroemeria psittacina =

Species of flowering plant

Alstroemeria psittacina, with the common names Peruvian lily, parrot flower, parrot lily, lily of the Incas, princess lily and New Zealand Christmas bell, (Note: syn. Alstroemeria cf. psittacina Lehm., Alstroemeria pulchella L.f. is cited as a misapplied name of this plant.) is a species of flowering plant in the family Alstroemeriaceae. It is found in cerrado and pantanal vegetation in Brazil and Argentina.

== Description ==
Alstroemeria psittacina is a perennial herb with underground tubers. Flowers grow in umbels of 3-8 flowers. They can be red to reddish-purple, sometimes with brownish spots.

== Distribution ==
It is native to Brazil, Argentina, and Paraguay but widely cultivated as an ornamental and escaped into the wild in Australia (New South Wales and Norfolk Island), New Zealand, Madeira, the Canary Islands, and the southeastern United States (eastern Texas, Louisiana, Mississippi, Alabama, Georgia, and Florida).

== Cultivation ==
Alstroemeria psittacina is cultivated as an ornamental plant by plant nurseries, for use in temperate gardens, such as in California.

It is a popular ornamental plant in New Zealand, where it usually blooms at Christmastime and is referred to as New Zealand Christmas bell. In addition, this plant is cited as an invasive plant, and it is a natural host range of the Alstroemeria mosaic potyvirus.

== See also ==
- List of plants known as lily
