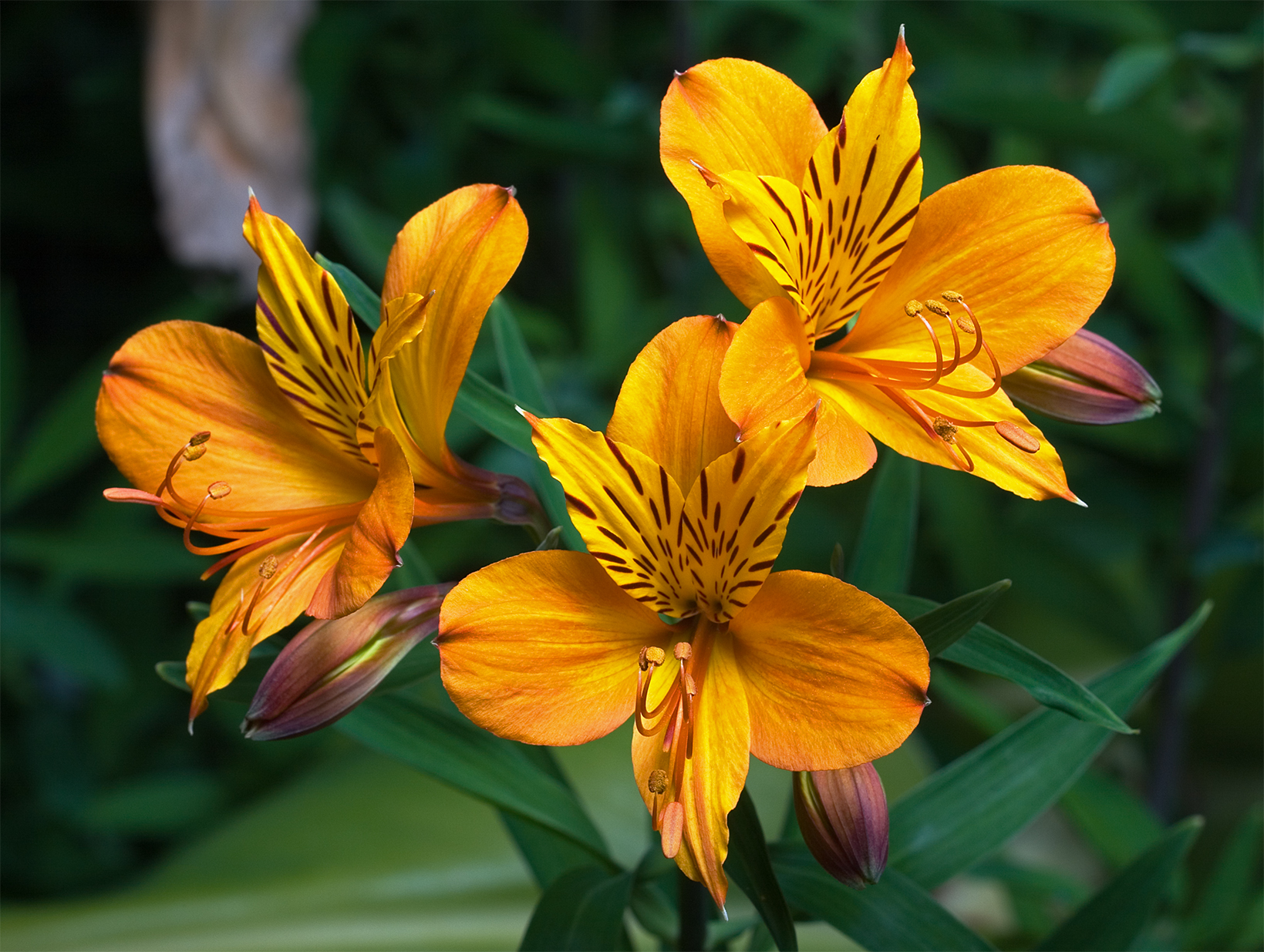
- Peruvian lily (Alstroemeria aurea)

Scientific classification
- Kingdom: Plantae
- Clade: Embryophytes
- Clade: Tracheophytes
- Clade: Spermatophytes
- Clade: Angiosperms
- Clade: Monocots
- Order: Liliales
- Family: Alstroemeriaceae
- Tribe: Alstroemerieae
- Genus: Alstroemeria; L.

Type species
- Alstroemeria pelegrina L.

Synonyms
- Alstremeria, alternative spelling; Ligtu Adans.; Lilavia Raf.; Priopetalon Raf.; Schickendantzia Pax; Taltalia Ehr.Bayer

= Alstroemeria =

Genus of South American flowering plants

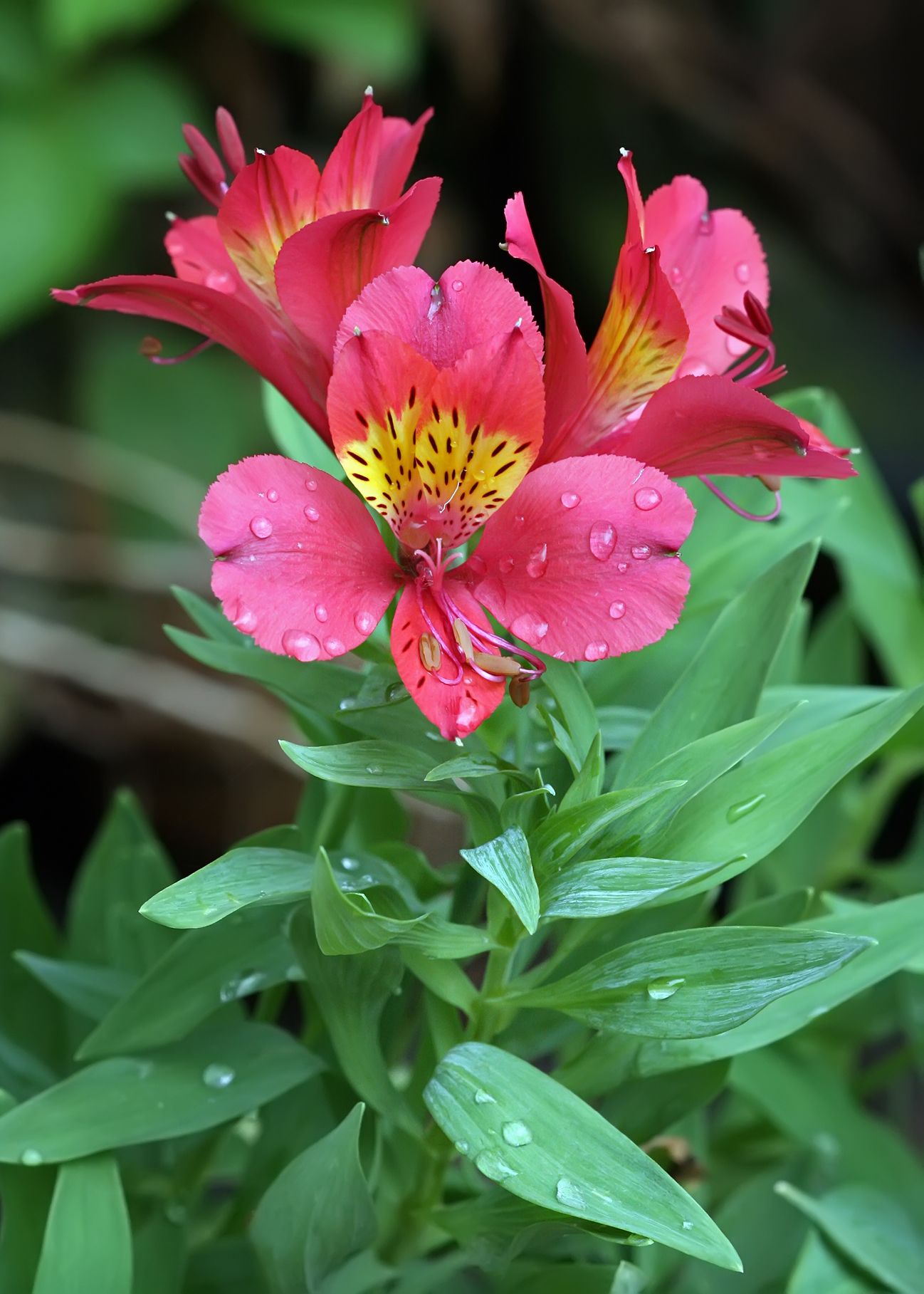
Alstroemeria × hybrida in the Lalbagh Botanical Gardens

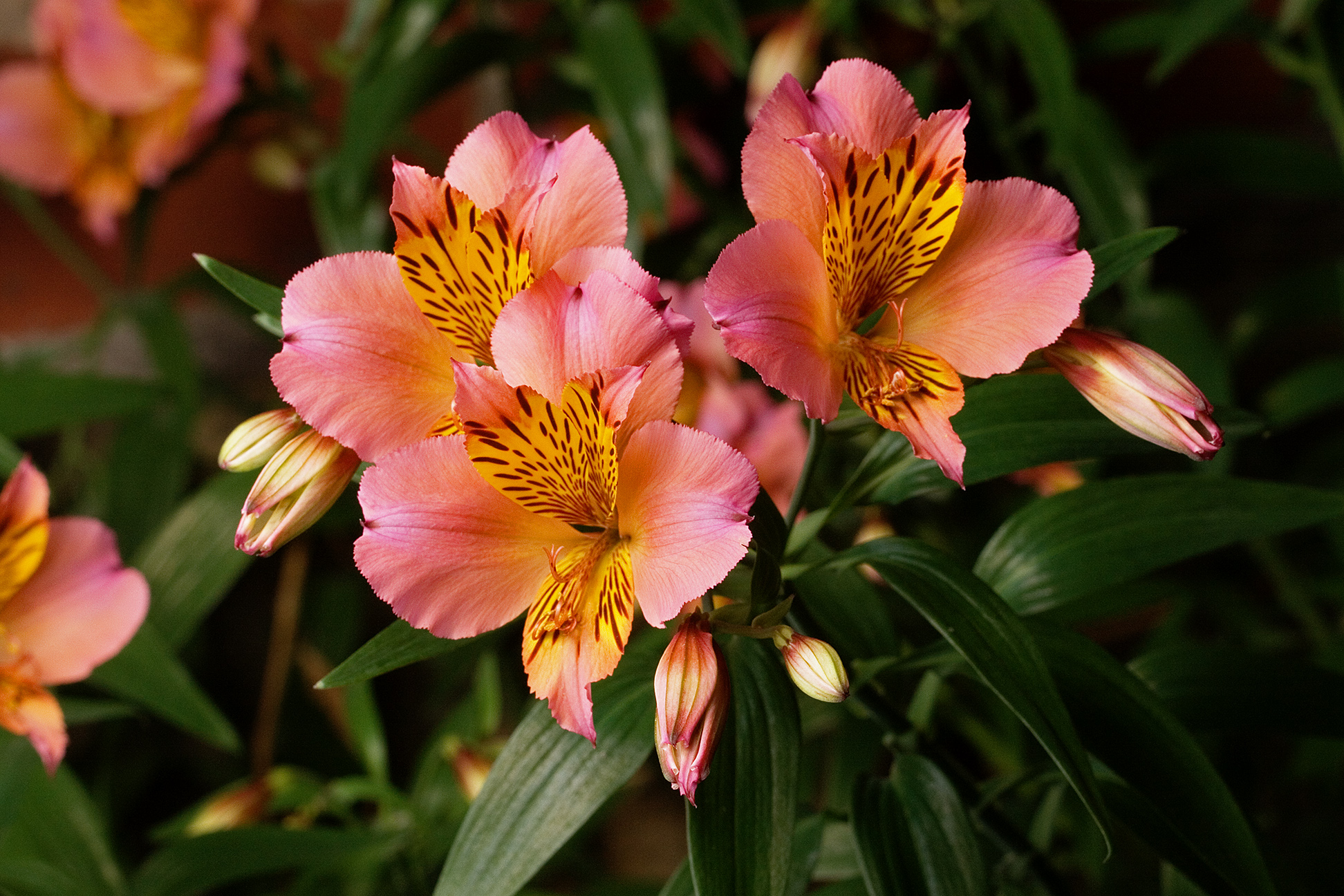
Alstroemeria 'Saturne'

Alstroemeria (/ˌælstrɪˈmɪəriə/), commonly called the Peruvian lily or lily of the Incas, is a genus of flowering plants in the family Alstroemeriaceae. They are all native to South America, although some have become naturalized in the United States, Mexico, Australia, New Zealand, Madeira and the Canary Islands. Almost all of the species are restricted to one of two distinct centers of diversity: one in central Chile and southern Argentina, the other in eastern Brazil. Species of Alstroemeria from Patagonia are winter-growing plants, while those of Brazil are summer growing. All are long-lived perennials except A. graminea, a diminutive annual from the Atacama Desert of Chile.

== Description ==
Plants of this genus grow from a cluster of tubers. They send up fertile and sterile stems, the fertile stems of some species reaching 1.5 meters (4.9 feet) in height. The leaves are alternately arranged and resupinate, twisted on the petioles so that the undersides face up. The leaves are variable in shape and the blades have smooth edges. The flowers are solitary or borne in umbels. The flower has six petals each up to 5 centimeters (2.0 inches) long. They come in many shades of red, orange, yellow, green, purple, pink, and white, flecked and striped and streaked with darker colors. There are six curving stamens. The stigma has three lobes. The fruit is a capsule with three valves. Alstroemeria are classified as an inferior monocot, meaning the petals are located above the ovary and the leaf veins are parallel.

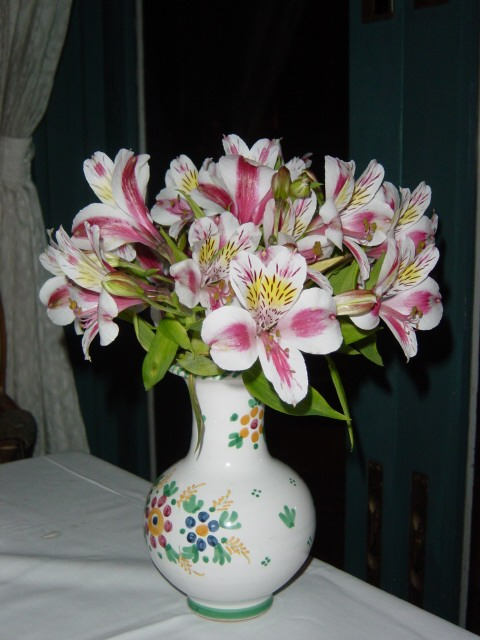
An Alstroemeria cultivar

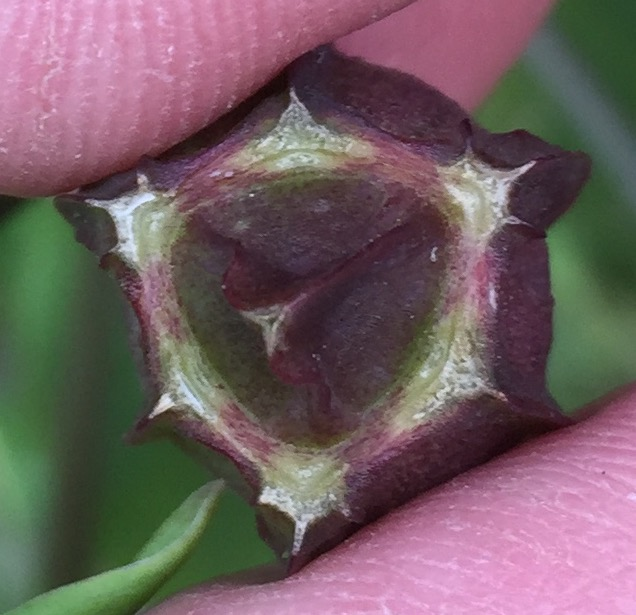
Alstroemeria capsule viewed from above, showing anatomical detail, including apical beak, vascular bundles (in section) in ribs etc.

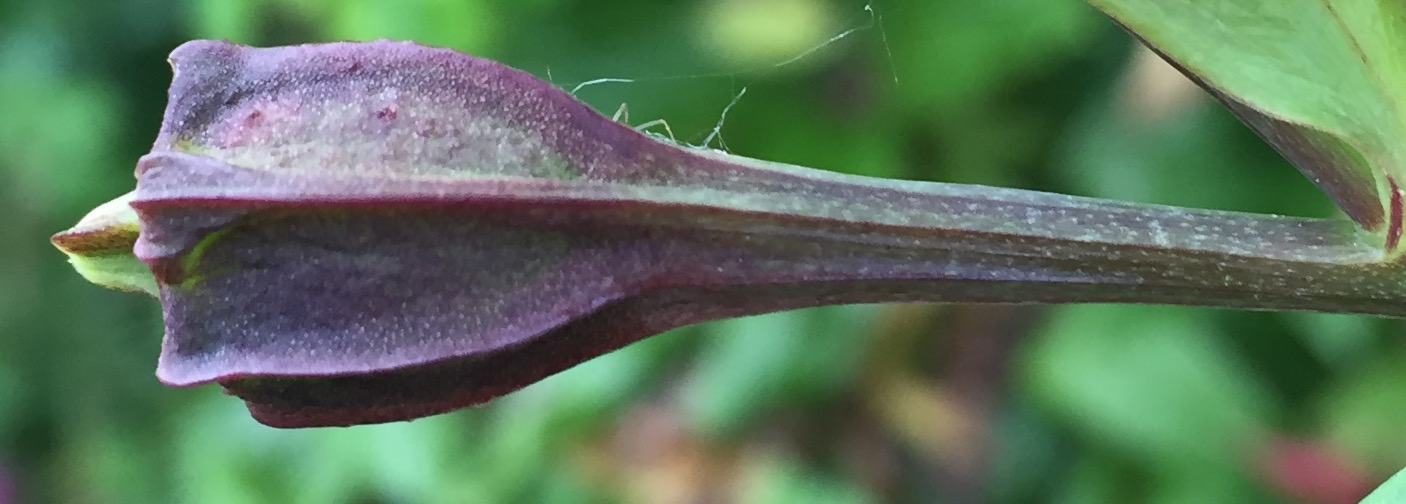
Alstroemeria seed capsule viewed from side, showing winged ribs and (triangular pyramidal) apical beak.

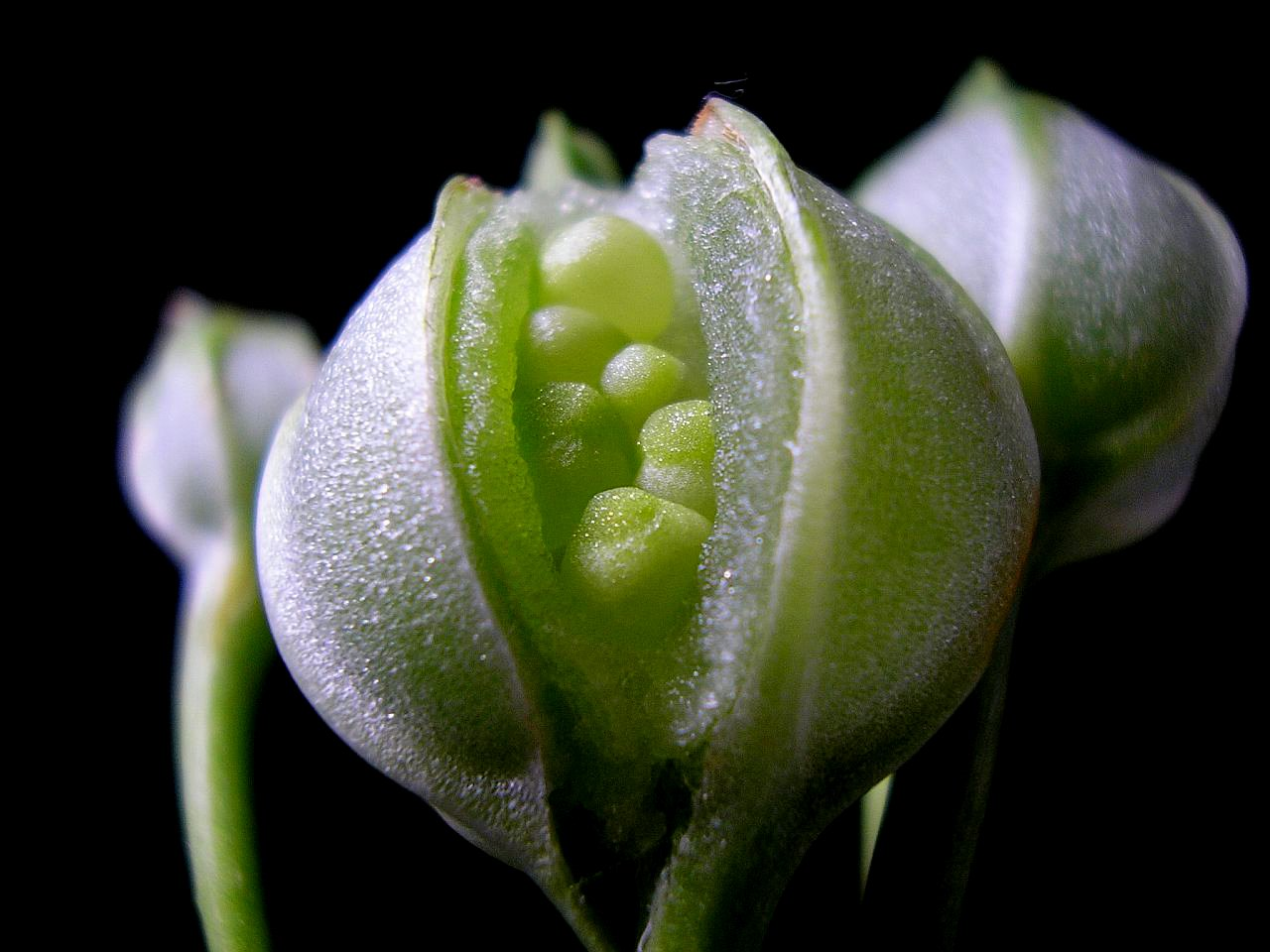
Premature dehiscence of Alstroemeria seed capsule

== Distribution and habitat ==
The genus Alstroemeria is exclusively native to South America, with various species found ranging from Venezuela (3° north of the Equator), to Tierra del Fuego, Argentina (53° South). Within this range of the entire genus, two centers of species diversity are recognized, one in Brazil and one in Chile.

In Chile, Alstroemeria is amongst the most diverse genera of vascular monocotyledons, with more than 50 recognized or accepted taxa (species, subspecies and varieties). Of these taxa, roughly 80% are endemic to the Mediterranean matorral zone of central Chile.

In Brazil, which is home to more than 40 species, most Alstroemeria species are found outside of the Amazonian region, and are concentrated towards the south and east of the country. Alstroemeria can be found in almost all types of habitat, from forests to savannahs, caatingas to swamps, and commonly, high altitude grasslands and rocky outcrops, with typical altitudes ranging from 300m in the Amazon, to 2300m in the Itatiaia National Park. Most Brazilian species have relatively restricted distributions.

== Taxonomy ==
The genus was described by Johan Peter Falk and his thesis supervisor Carl Linnaeus in his 1762 dissertation Planta Alströmeria. Linnaeus bears the botanical authority (L.).

=== Etymology ===
The genus was named after the Swedish baron Clas Alströmer (1736–1794), a friend of Linnaeus. The family name Alströmer is itself a botanical one: Swedish al ("alder") + ström ("stream").

== Cultivation and uses ==
Many hybrids and at least 190 cultivars have been developed, featuring many markings and colors, including white, yellow, orange, apricot, pink, red, purple, and lavender. The most popular and showy hybrids commonly grown today result from crosses between species from Chile (winter-growing) with species from Brazil (summer-growing). This strategy has overcome the florists' problem of seasonal dormancy and resulted in plants that are evergreen, or nearly so, and flower for most of the year. This breeding work derives mainly from trials that began in the United States in the 1980s; the main breeding is done nowadays by companies in the Netherlands. The flower, which resembles a miniature lily, is very popular for bouquets and flower arrangements in the commercial cut flower trade. These delicate flowers survive up to 14 days in water without any signs of shrivelling.

Most cultivars available for the home garden will bloom in the late spring and early summer. The roots are hardy to a temperature of 23 °F (−5 °C). The plant requires at least six hours of morning sunlight, regular water, and well-drained soil.

=== AGM cultivars ===
The following cultivars have gained the Royal Horticultural Society's Award of Garden Merit, all with a hardiness rating of H4 (Hardy – average winter −10 to −5 °C (14 to 23 °F)) apart from 'Friendship' (H5: Hardy – cold winter −15 to −10 °C (5 to 14 °F)):

- 'Apollo' (white/yellow flowers, 100 cm)
- 'Cahors' (pink/yellow, 90 cm)
- 'Coronet' (salmon/yellow flowers, 140 cm)
- 'Friendship' (yellow flushed pink, 100 cm)
- 'Orange Glory' (150 cm)
- 'Oriana' (salmon/yellow, 50 cm)
- 'Phoenix' (red/yellow, 100 cm)
- 'Red Elf' (100 cm)
- 'Sirius' (pink/yellow, 100 cm)
- 'Sonata' (red/yellow, 100 cm)
- 'Spitfire' (orange/yellow, 90 cm)
- 'Tessa' (red flowers, 120 cm)
- 'Yellow Friendship' (140 cm)

== Ecology ==
Some alstroemerias have escaped cultivation and become weeds, such as Alstroemeria pulchella. and A. aurea, which are now weeds in Australia.

== Species ==
Image	Name	Distribution
	Alstroemeria achirae	Maule
	Alstroemeria albescens	Rio Grande do Sul
	Alstroemeria altoparadisea	Goiás
	Alstroemeria amabilis	Brazil
	Alstroemeria amazonica	Pará, Bolívar
	Alstroemeria andina	Chile, Argentina
	Alstroemeria angustifolia	Santiago
	Alstroemeria annapolina	Goiás
	Alstroemeria apertiflora	Brazil, Argentina, Paraguay
	Alstroemeria aquidauanica	Mato Grosso
	Alstroemeria arnicana	Goiás
	Alstroemeria aulica	Valparaíso
	Alstroemeria aurea	Chile, Argentina; naturalized in New Zealand, Victoria (Australia)
	Alstroemeria bahiensis	Bahia
	Alstroemeria bakeri	Catamarca
	Alstroemeria bilabiata	Santiago
	Alstroemeria brasiliensis	Brazil
	Alstroemeria burchellii	Goiás
	Alstroemeria cabralensis	Minas Gerais
	Alstroemeria caiaponica	Goiás
	Alstroemeria calliantha	Minas Gerais
	Alstroemeria cantillanica	O'Higgins
	Alstroemeria capixaba	Espírito Santo
	Alstroemeria caryophyllaea	Brazil
	Alstroemeria chapadensis	Mato Grosso
	Alstroemeria chorillensis	Peru
	Alstroemeria crispata	northern Chile
	Alstroemeria cuiabana	Mato Grosso
	Alstroemeria cultrifolia	Brasília
	Alstroemeria cunha	Brazil
	Alstroemeria decora	Valparaíso
	Alstroemeria diluta	Coquimbo
	Alstroemeria discolor	Valparaíso
	Alstroemeria douradensis	Goiás
	Alstroemeria espigonensis	Bahia
	Alstroemeria esteparica	Aysén, Chile and Argentina
	Alstroemeria exerens	Chile, Argentina
	Alstroemeria fiebrigiana	Bolivia
	Alstroemeria firmulifolia	Minas Gerais
	Alstroemeria foliosa	Brazil, Paraguay
	Alstroemeria fuscovinosa	Brazil
	Alstroemeria garaventae	Central Chile
	Alstroemeria gardneri	Brazil
	Alstroemeria glaucandra	Valparaíso
	Alstroemeria gouveiana	Minas Gerais
	Alstroemeria graminea	Antofagasta, Atacama
	Alstroemeria hookeri	Coquimbo
	Alstroemeria huemulina	Bío Bío
	Alstroemeria ibitipocae	Minas Gerais
	Alstroemeria igarapavica	São Paulo
	Alstroemeria inodora	Brazil
	Alstroemeria isabellana	Brazil, Argentina, Uruguay, Paraguay
	Alstroemeria itabiritensis	Minas Gerais
	Alstroemeria jequitiana	Minas Gerais
	Alstroemeria jocunda	Santiago
	Alstroemeria julieae	Minas Gerais
	Alstroemeria kingii	Coquimbo
	Alstroemeria lactilutea	Tarapacá
	Alstroemeria landimana	Brasília
	Alstroemeria leporina	Valparaíso
	Alstroemeria ligtu, St. Martin's flower	Peru, Chile, Argentina
	Alstroemeria litterata	Mato Grosso
	Alstroemeria longaviensis	Maule
	Alstroemeria longistaminea	Brazil
	Alstroemeria longistyla	Goiás, Minas Gerais
	Alstroemeria lutea	Tarapacá
	Alstroemeria magna	Valparaíso
	Alstroemeria magnifica	Coquimbo
	Alstroemeria malmeana	Brazil
	Alstroemeria maxima	Brazil
	Alstroemeria modesta	Chile
	Alstroemeria mollensis	Coquimbo
	Alstroemeria monantha	Chile
	Alstroemeria monticola	Bahia, Minas Gerais
	Alstroemeria nidularis	Maule
	Alstroemeria nivea	Coquimbo
	Alstroemeria ochracea	Minas Gerais
	Alstroemeria orchidioides	Brasília, Goiás
	Alstroemeria pallida	Chile
	Alstroemeria paraensis	Pará
	Alstroemeria patagonica	southern Argentina, southern Chile
	Alstroemeria paupercula	Peru, northern Chile
	Alstroemeria pelegrina, Peruvian lily	Peru, Chile
	Alstroemeria penduliflora	Minas Gerais
	Alstroemeria philippii	northern Chile
	Alstroemeria piauhyensis	Brazil
	Alstroemeria plantaginea	Brazil, Venezuela
	Alstroemeria poetica	Chile
	Alstroemeria polpaicana	Santiago
	Alstroemeria polyphylla	Chile
	Alstroemeria presliana	Chile, Argentina
	Alstroemeria pseudospathulata	Chile, Argentina
	Alstroemeria psittacina	Brazil, Argentina; naturalized in Australia, New Zealand, Southeastern United States, southern Mexico, Madeira, Canary Islands
	Alstroemeria pubiflora	Goiás
	Alstroemeria pudica	Santiago
	Alstroemeria pulchra	Santiago
	Alstroemeria punctata	Brasília, Goiás
	Alstroemeria pygmaea	Peru, Brazil, Argentina
	Alstroemeria radula	Brazil
	Alstroemeria recumbens	Chile
	Alstroemeria revoluta	Central Chile
	Alstroemeria ribeirensis	Paraná
	Alstroemeria roseoviridis	Mato Grosso do Sul
	Alstroemeria rupestris	Minas Gerais
	Alstroemeria sabulosa	Valparaíso
	Alstroemeria schizanthoides	Chile
	Alstroemeria sellowiana	Brazil
	Alstroemeria spathulata	Chile, Argentina
	Alstroemeria speciosa	São Paulo
	Alstroemeria spectabilis	Santiago
	Alstroemeria stenopetala	Goiás, Minas Gerais
	Alstroemeria talcaensis	Maule
	Alstroemeria timida	Santiago
	Alstroemeria tombolatoana	Goiás, Minas Gerais
	Alstroemeria umbellata	Chile, Argentina
	Alstroemeria variegata	Minas Gerais
	Alstroemeria venusta	Chile
	Alstroemeria versicolor	Central Chile
	Alstroemeria virginalis	Coquimbo
	Alstroemeria viridiflora	Brazil
	Alstroemeria werdermannii	Chile
	Alstroemeria xavantinensis	Mato Grosso
	Alstroemeria yaelae	Santiago
	Alstroemeria zoelneri	Chile

== See also ==
- List of plants known as lily
- List of Alstroemeria species

== General sources ==
- Linnaeus; Falk, Johan Peter (1762). Planta Alströmeria. Holmiae: Laurentii Salvii., published in Amoenitates Academicae 6: 247–262 1763
- Sanso, Andrea Mariel (1996). "El Género Alstroemeria (Alstroemeriaceae) en Argentina". Darwiniana. 34 (1/4): 349–382. JSTOR 23223205.
