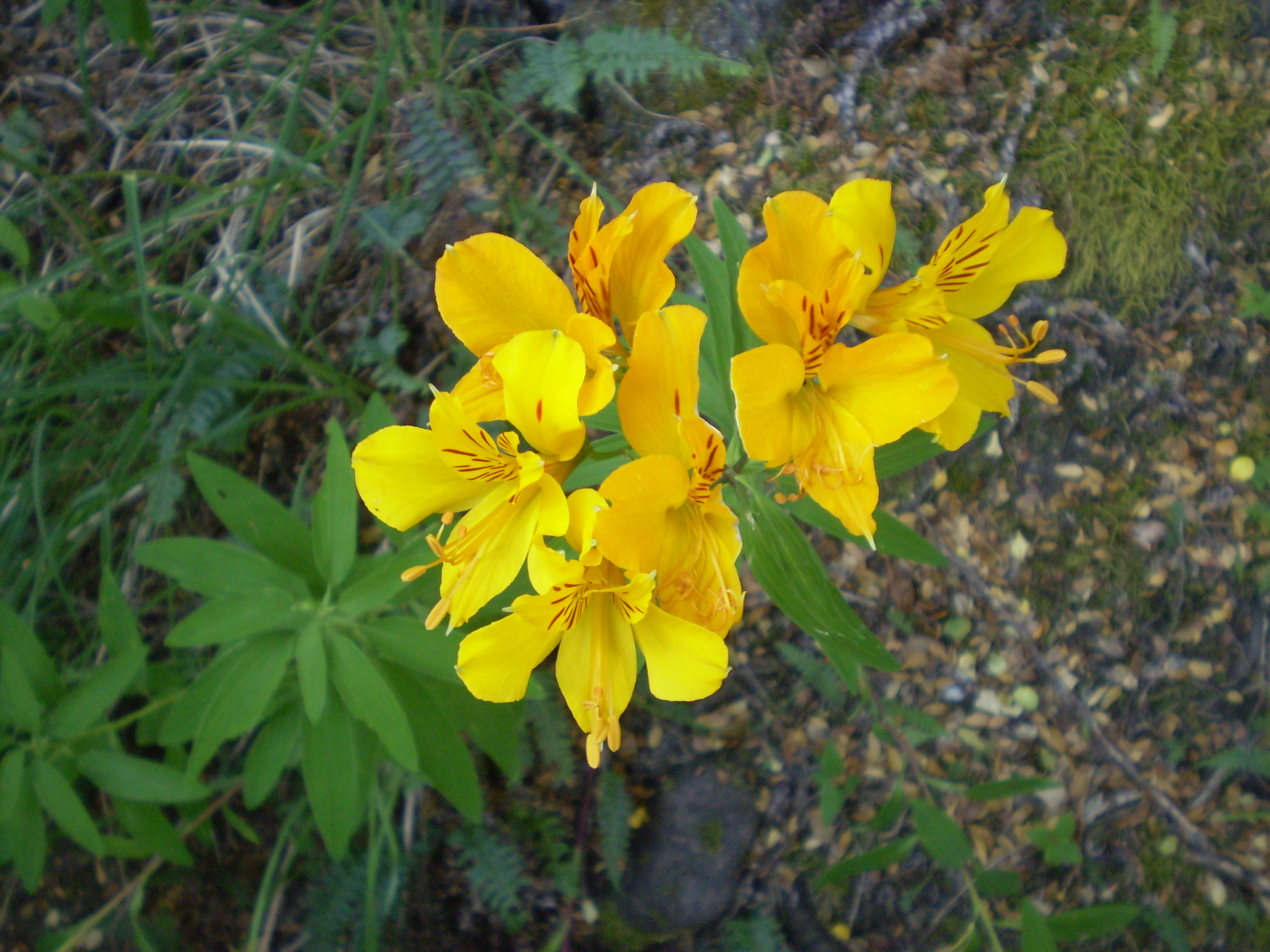

Scientific classification
- Kingdom: Plantae
- Clade: Tracheophytes
- Clade: Angiosperms
- Clade: Monocots
- Order: Liliales
- Family: Alstroemeriaceae
- Genus: Alstroemeria
- Species: A. patagonica

Binomial name
- Alstroemeria patagonica Phil.

= Alstroemeria patagonica =

Species of plant

Alstroemeria patagonica is a species of flowering plant in the family Alstroemeriaceae, native to southern Argentina and southern Chile.
