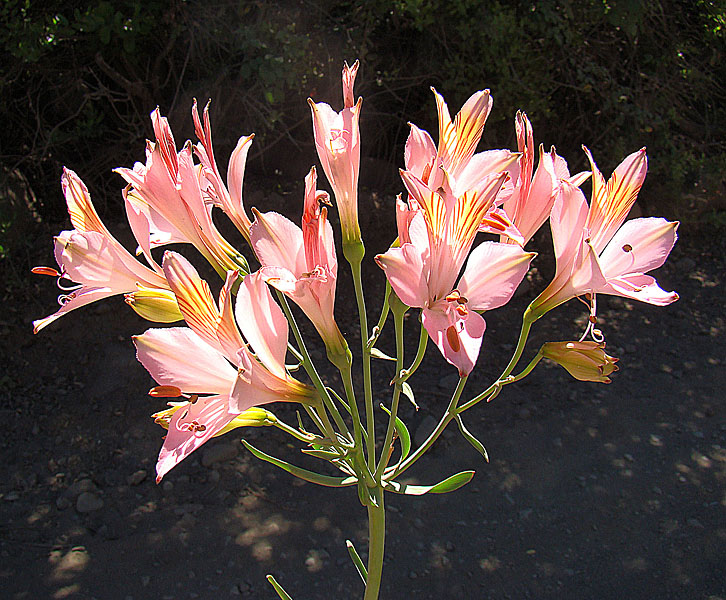

Scientific classification
- Kingdom: Plantae
- Clade: Tracheophytes
- Clade: Angiosperms
- Clade: Monocots
- Order: Liliales
- Family: Alstroemeriaceae
- Genus: Alstroemeria
- Species: A. ligtu

Binomial name
- Alstroemeria ligtu L.

= Alstroemeria ligtu =

Peruvian lily

Species of plant

Alstroemeria ligtu, the Peruvian lily, is a species of flowering plant in the family Alstroemeriaceae, native to Peru, northwest Argentina and central Chile.

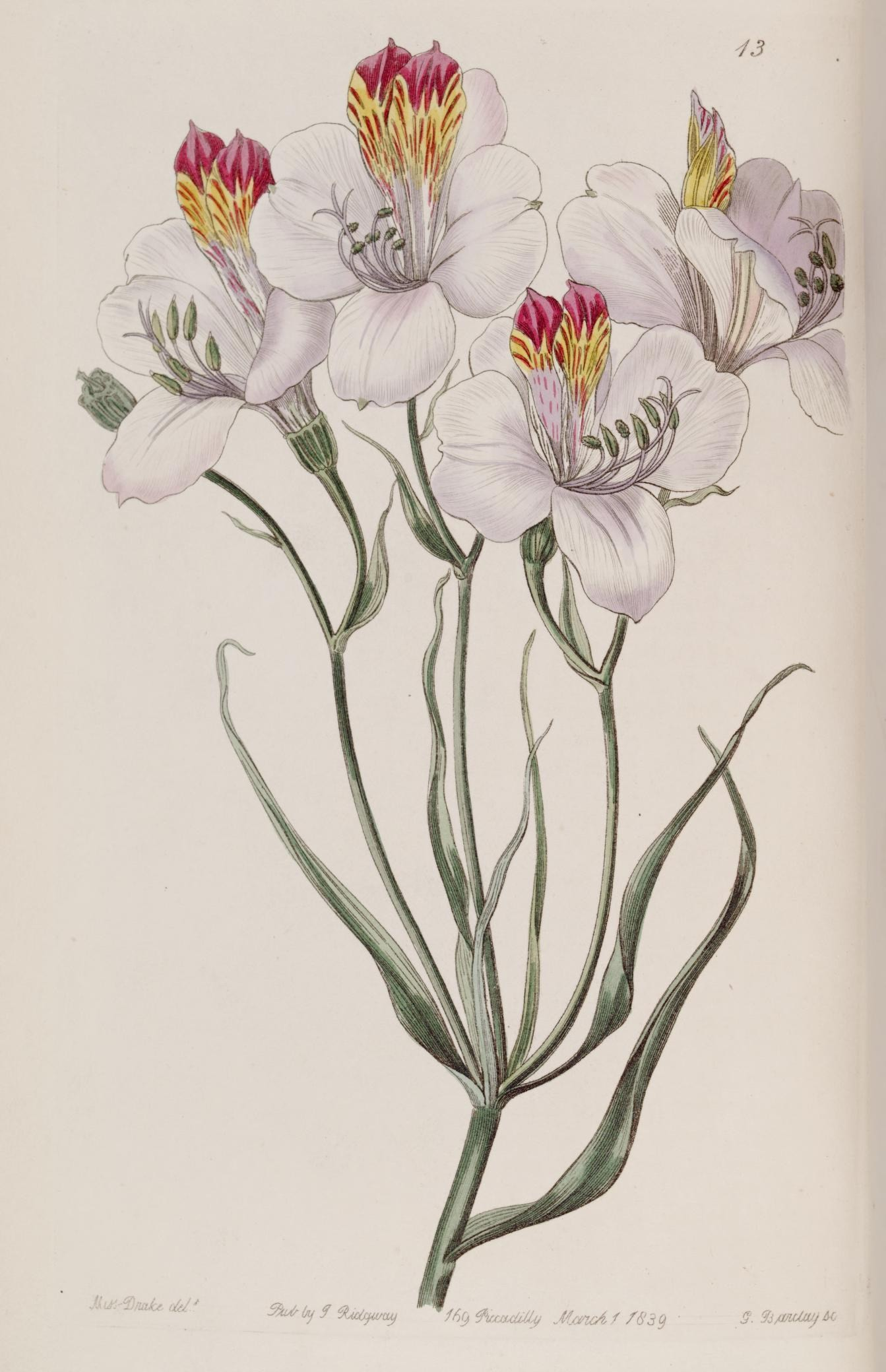
Illustration.
