= The Herbert Medal =

The Herbert Medal is awarded by the International Bulb Society to those whose achievements in advancing knowledge of ornamental bulbous plants is considered to be outstanding.

The medal is named for William Herbert, a noted 19th-century botanist. He published many articles in the Botanical Register and the Botanical Magazine on the subject of bulbous plants, many of which he cultivated in his own gardens. He wrote what became the standard work on the family Amaryllidaceae in 1837. He also published extensively on hybridization based on his own experiments, not only on bulbs but also on other groups of plants.

== Herbert Medalists ==
A full list of those awarded the Herbert Medal is given on the International Bulb Society website, and in Herbertia (1937–1988).
