= Clas Alströmer =

Swedish naturalist (1736–1794)

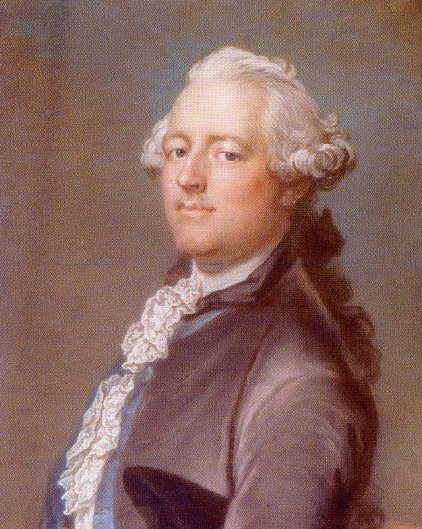
Clas Alströmer

Baron Clas Alströmer (9 August 1736 – 5 March 1794) was a Swedish naturalist who was a student of Carl Linnaeus at Uppsala University. From 1760 to 1764 he traveled throughout Southern Europe, collecting plants for Linnaeus. He established a botanical garden and natural museum near Gothenburg which was managed by the notable botanist Anders Dahl, another student of Linnaeus. Alströmer was the son of the industrialist Jonas Alströmer. The genus Alstroemeria was named after him by Linnaeus.
