= Mélica Muñoz-Schick =

Chilean botanist (b. 1941)

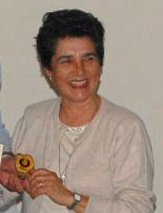
- Mélica Muñoz-Schick, 2008
- Born: 1941 (age 84–85); Chile
- Scientific career
- Fields: Botany
- Institutions: Chilean National Museum of Natural History
- Author abbrev. (botany): Muñoz-Schick

Mélica Elisa Muñoz-Schick (b. 1941) is a Chilean botanist noted for her work curating the collections of the herbarium at the Chilean National Museum of Natural History, as well as her research into the flora of Chile. The standard author abbreviation Muñoz-Schick is used to indicate this person as the author when citing a botanical name.

== Works ==
- Eggli, Urs; Muñoz S, Mélica; Leuenberger, Beat Ernst; Ritter, Friedrich (1995). Cactaceae of South America: the Ritter collections. Berlin: Botanischer Garten und Botanisches Museum Berlin-Dahlem. OCLC 742431987.
- Muñoz S, Mélica; Barrera M, Elizabeth; Meza P, Ines (1981). El uso medicinal y alimenticio de plantas nativas y naturalizadas en Chile (in Spanish). Santiago de Chile: Museo Nacional de Historia Natural. OCLC 10559350.
- Muñoz S, Mélica; Dirección de Bibliotecas, Archivos y Museos (1991). Flores del Norte Chico (in Spanish). La Serena, Chile: Dirección de Bibliotecas, Archivos y Museos, Ilustre Municipalidad de La Serena. OCLC 27261327.
- Muñoz S, Mélica; Moreira Muñoz, Andrés (2003). Alstroemerias de Chile: diversidad, distribución y conservación (in Spanish). Santiago: Taller La Era. OCLC 948234397.
- Muñoz S, Mélica (1980). Flora del Parque Nacional Puyehue (in Spanish). Place of publication not identified: publisher not identified. OCLC 10971620.
- Muñoz S, Mélica; Chile, Dirección de Bibliotecas; Museo Nacional de Historia Natural (Chile), Archivos y Museos (1999). La colección de Carlos José Bertero depositada en el herbario del Museo Nacional de Historia Natural. Santiago, Chile: Museo Nacional de Historia Natural. OCLC 49944846.
