= Amoenitates Academicae =

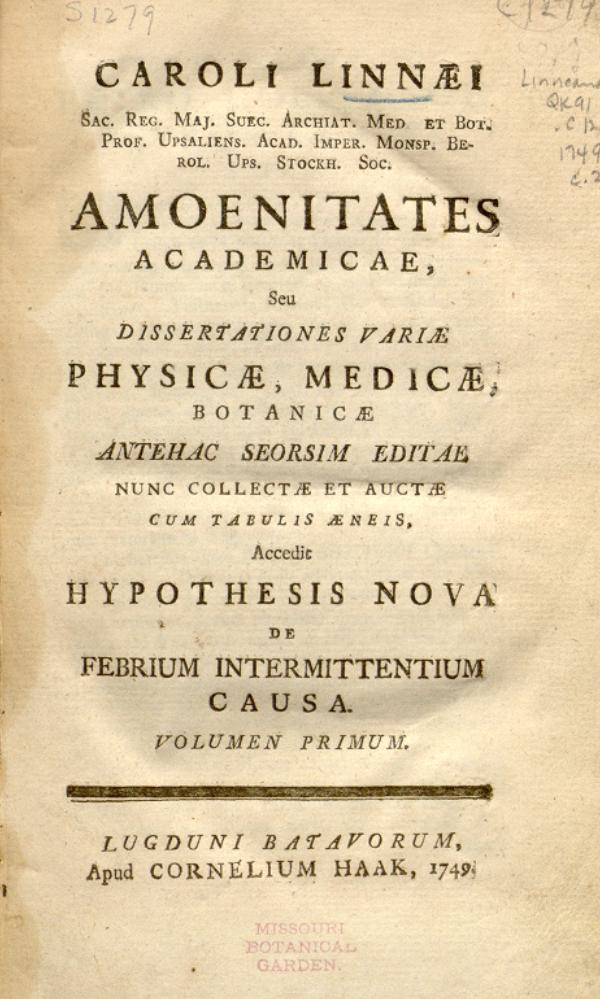
Title page of volume one

Amoenitates Academicae is the title of a multi-volume zoological and botanical publication (published during 1749–1790) consisting of the dissertations of the students of Carl Linnaeus, written during 1743–1776.

Seven out of ten volumes were published by Linnaeus himself, the last three were edited by Johann Christian von Schreber.

== Editions ==
- vol. 1: 1st ed., Stockholm and Leipzig, 1749, 2nd ed., Erlangen, 1787
- vol. 2: 1st ed., Stockholm, 1751; 2nd ed., Stockholm, 1762; 3rd ed., 1787
- vol. 3: 1st ed., Stockholm, 1756; 2nd ed., Erlangen, 1787
- vol. 4: 1st ed., Stockholm, 1759; 2nd ed., Erlangen, 1788
- vol. 5: 1st ed., Stockholm, 1760; 2nd ed., Erlangen, 1788
- vol. 6: 1st ed., Stockholm, 1763; 2nd ed., Erlangen, 1789
- vol. 7: 1st ed., Stockholm, 1769; 2nd ed., Erlangen, 1789
- vol. 8: 1st ed., Erlangen, 1785
- vol. 9: 1st ed., Erlangen, 1785
- vol. 10: 1st ed., Erlangen, 1790
