= Pierfelice Ravenna =

Chilean botanist (1938–2022)

- Born: 8 March 1938; Bologna
- Died: 21 July 2022 (aged 84)
- Awards: Herbert medal (1974)
- Scientific career
- Fields: Botany
- Author abbrev. (botany): Ravenna

Pierfelice (Pedro Félix, Pierre Félice) Ravenna (1938–2022) was a Chilean botanist of Italian Jewish origin. His research interests were mainly in the field of South American Amaryllidaceae, Alstromeriaceae and Iridaceae.

== Selected publications ==
- 1970a. Nuevas especies de Amaryllidaceae. Notic. Mens. Mus. Nac. Hist. Nat. Santiago 269 : 1-7
- 1970b. Contributions to South American Amaryllidaceae III. Pl. Life 37: 73–103, figs. 18-25
- Ravenna, P (1972). "Famatina gen. nov., Amaryllidaceae". Plant Life. 28: 55–62.
- 1972. Latin American Amaryllidis 1971. Pl. Life 28: 119–127, figs. 28-30
- 1974. Contributions to South American Amaryllidaceae VI. Pl. Life 30: 29-79
- 1978. Studies in the Alliaceae‑II (error tip. "Alliae”). Pl. Life 34 (2): 3-10
- Ravenna, P (1981). "Contributions to South American Amaryllidaceae VII". Plant Life. 37: 57–83.
- 1983. Catila and Onira, two new genera of South American Iridaceae. Nordic Journal of Botany 3 ( 2): 197-205
- 1988. New species of South American Habranthus and Zephyranthes (Amaryllidaceae). Onira 1 (8): 53-56
- 2000a. New or noteworthy Leucocoryne species (Alliaceae). Onira 4 (2): 3-10
- 2000b. The family Gilliesiaceae. Onira 4 (3): 11-14 (with key to genera)
- 2000c. Miersia scalae, a synonym of Gilliesia monophylla (Gilliesaceae). Onira 4 (8):30
- Ravenna, P. (2003a). "Elucidation and systematics of the Chilean genera of Amaryllidaceae". Botanica Australis. 2: 1–20.
- 2003b. Los subgéneros de Leucocoryne y la ilegitimidad de Pabellonia (Alliaceae).Chloris Chilensis 6 ( 2)
- 2005a. Gilliesia dimera and Gilliesia isopetala two new species from central Chile (Gilliesiaceae). Onira 9 (17): 60-63
- 2005b. Solaria brevicoalita and S. curacavina two Chilean species of Gilliesiaceae. Onira 9 (16): 64-67
- 2005c. On the absence of the genus Gilliesia (Gilliesiaceae) in the Argentine flora. Onira 9 (15): 59
- 2005d. Especies nuevas de Gilliesia y Solaria (Gilliesiaceae) y claves para el reconocimiento de las especies de ambos géneros. Chloris Chilensis 8 ( 1)

== Awards ==
Ravenna was awarded The Herbert Medal in 1974.

== Legacy ==
The International Plant Names Index lists 1,741 taxa for which Ravenna is the botanical authority. Another paper counted and listed 1025 names published by Ravenna, 681 of which were newly described at the species or infraspecific level. Although some of his herbarium specimens are deposited at international herbaria, his own personal herbarium including many type specimens was destroyed.

== Bibliography ==
IPNI. List of plant names with authority Ravenna.
