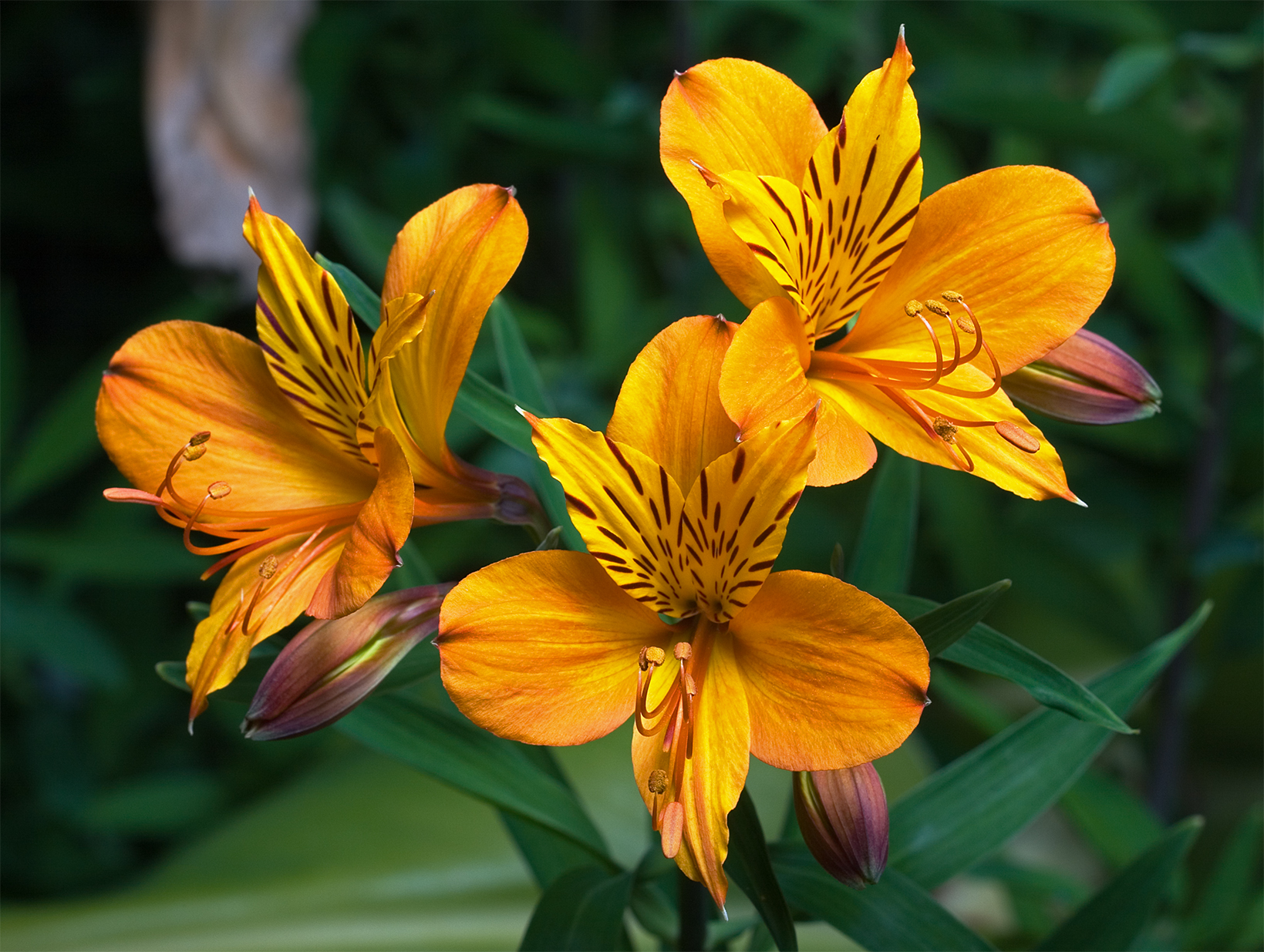
- Alstroemeria aurea in cultivation

Scientific classification
- Kingdom: Plantae
- Clade: Tracheophytes
- Clade: Angiosperms
- Clade: Monocots
- Order: Liliales
- Family: Alstroemeriaceae; Dumort.

Type genus
- Alstroemeria L.

Genera
- Alstroemeria L.; Bomarea Mirb.; Drymophila R.Br.; Luzuriaga Ruiz & Pav.

= Alstroemeriaceae =

Family of flowering plants

Alstroemeriaceae is a family of flowering plants, with 254 known species in four genera, almost entirely native to the Americas, from Central America to southern South America. One species of Luzuriaga occurs in New Zealand, and the genus Drymophila is endemic to south-eastern Australia.

The genus Alstroemeria, commonly called the Peruvian lilies, is popular florist's and garden flower. The genus Bomarea is a vine that produces clusters of variously-colored, bell-shaped flowers.

== Classification ==
The APG II system, of 2003 (unchanged from the APG system, of 1998), treats the family in the order Liliales, in the clade monocots. The APG III system, of 2009, merged the obscure family Luzuriagaceae into the Alstroemeriaceae, since the former group included only two genera, was the sister group of the Alstroemeriaceae, and possessed the same distinctive twisted petioles.

Tribe	Image	Genus	Species
Alstroemerieae		Alstroemeria L.	123 species
Alstroemerieae		Bomarea Mirb.,	110 - 122 species
Luzuriageae		Drymophila R.Br.	Drymophila cyanocarpa R.Br., turquoise berry or native Solomons seal, native to Tasmania, Victoria and southern New South Wales; Drymophila moorei Baker, orange berry, native to northern New South Wales and Queensland.
Luzuriageae		Luzuriaga Ruiz & Pav.	Luzuriaga marginata (Gaertn.) Benth. & Hook.f. - almond flower - Southern Chile, Southern Argentina, Falkland Islands; Luzuriaga parviflora (Hook.f.) Kunth - New Zealand; Luzuriaga polyphylla (Hook.f.) J.F.Macbr. - Southern Chile; Luzuriaga radicans Ruiz & Pav. - Southern Chile, Southern Argentina

== Distribution ==
Alstroemeriaceae is distributed in tropical and temperate America, from Mexico and the Antilles to Tierra del Fuego. Luzuriageae is distributed from Peru to the Falkland Islands and Tierra del Fuego, New Zealand and Australia (NSW to Tasmania).

== Uses ==
=== As food ===
Bomarea edulis is distributed from Mexico to Argentina. Its tubers have been used from pre-Columbian times as a food source. A single plant can have up to 20 tubers each 5 cm in diameter.

=== As ornamental plants ===
Some of the Alstroemeriaceae species used for ornamental purposes are:

- Alstroemeria aurea: endemic to Southern Chile. Flowers in the summer. Flowers are 3–4 cm in diameter, they're yellow and orange, tinged with green.
- Alstroemeria haemantha: endemic to Chile, especially near Valparaíso. It grown near rocks and flowers at the beginning of summer. It has red flowers that can grow up to 5 cm in diameter.
- Alstroemeria ligtu: endemic to Chile, it grows in stoney, sand, dry soil. It flowers at the end of spring and the beginning of summer and has a height of 60 cm–1 m. Its flowers present several colours, usually lilac and pink, red or white.
- Alstroemeria psittacina: distributed in the Brazilian swamp, Peru and the Misiones Province in Argentina. Its flowers have a length of 4–5 cm, and grow in bunches of 5 to 6 flowers. Its petals are red and green.
- Bomarea ovallei (syn.: Leontochir ovallei): endemic to Chile, grows in stoney soil in full sunlight in the 3rd Region of Chile. It has red flowers, which can also be yellow, although rarely. They can have a diameter of up to 10 cm. It is an endangered species due to its modest distribution and its use as food by wild animals.

Other species, such as Luzuriaga radicans, also endemic to Chile, have potential as ornamental plants.

== Bibliography ==
- Anton Hofreiter & R. E. Rodríguez: The Alstroemeriaceae in Peru and neighbouring areas, in Revistá Biología Peruana, 13 (1), 2006, p. 1-62.
- Aagesen, L.; A. M. Sanso. (2003). "The phylogeny of the Alstroemeriaceae, based on morphology, rps16 intron, and rbcL sequence data". Syst. Bot. 28 (58).
- Sanso, A. M.; C. C. Xifreda (1997). "A morphological and taxonomic appraisal of the monotypic South American genus Schickendantzia (Alstroemeriaceae)". Scripta Bot. Belgica. 15 (139).
- Chacón, J.; M. Camargo de Assis; A. W. Meerow & S. S. Renner (2012). "From east Gondwana to Central America: Historical biogeography of the Alstroemeriaceae". Journal of Biogeography. 39 (10): 1806–1818. Bibcode:2012JBiog..39.1806C. doi:10.1111/j.1365-2699.2012.02749.x.
