= List of Alstroemeria species =

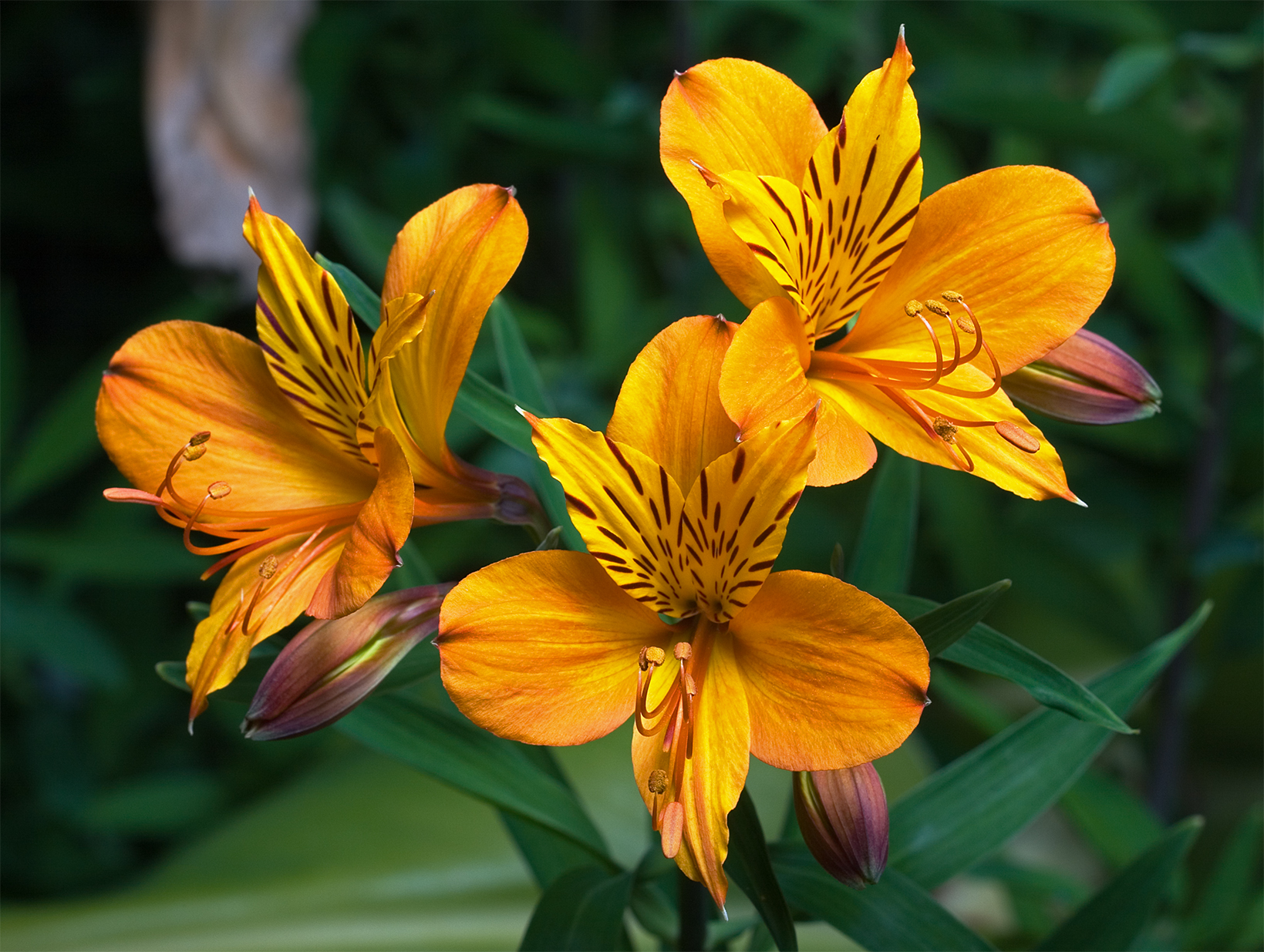
Flowers of Alstroemeria aurea derived from plants grown in Tasmania, Australia.

Alstroemeria is a South American genus belonging to the Alstroemeria family, composed of 124 species distributed from southern Venezuela to southern Argentina and Chile.

The genus was named by Carl Linnaeus in honor of his friend, the Swedish botanist Clas Alströmer, who was the first to collect seeds of these species in South America and send them to Europe in 1753.

Alstroemeria plants are tuberous or rhizomatous and perennial. Each erect stem has a foliage of a few lanceolate leaves and ends in an umbel of 3 to 10 flowers. These have 6 tepals with markings and patches of contrasting colors. The basic chromosome number of the genus is x = 8.

== List of species ==
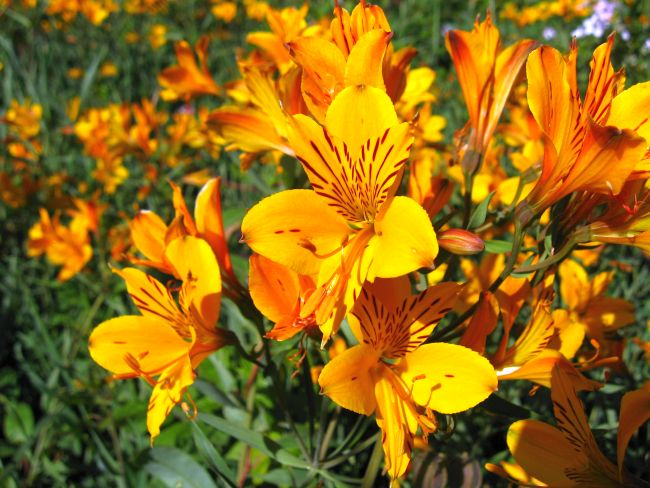
Alstroemeria aurea.

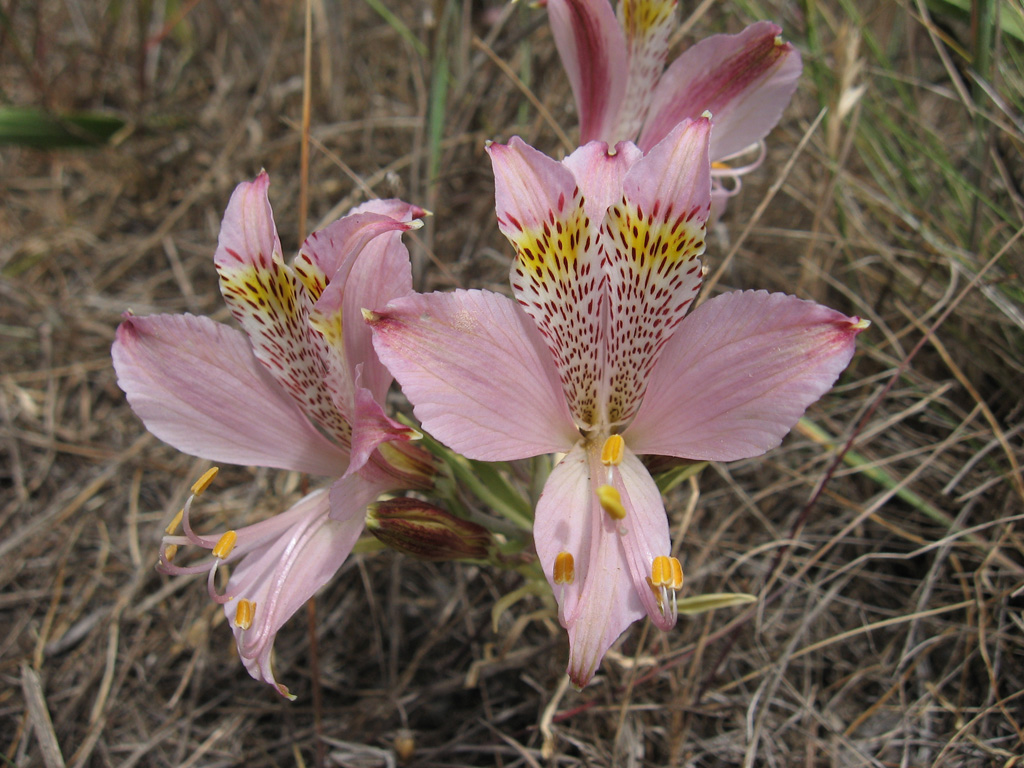
Alstroemeria hookeri.

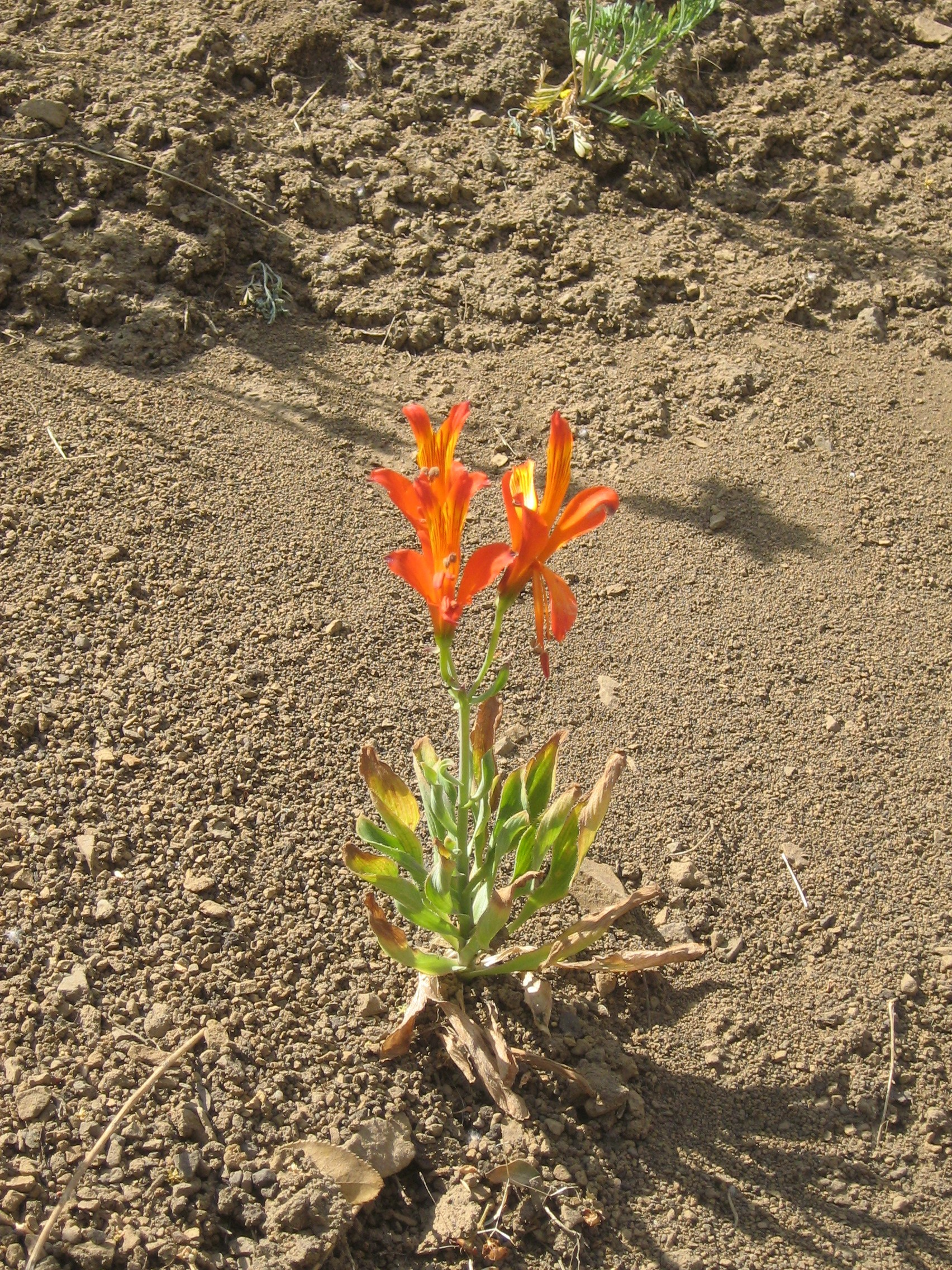
Alstroemeria ligtu, photographed in its natural habitat, in central Chile, at 1200 meters above sea level.

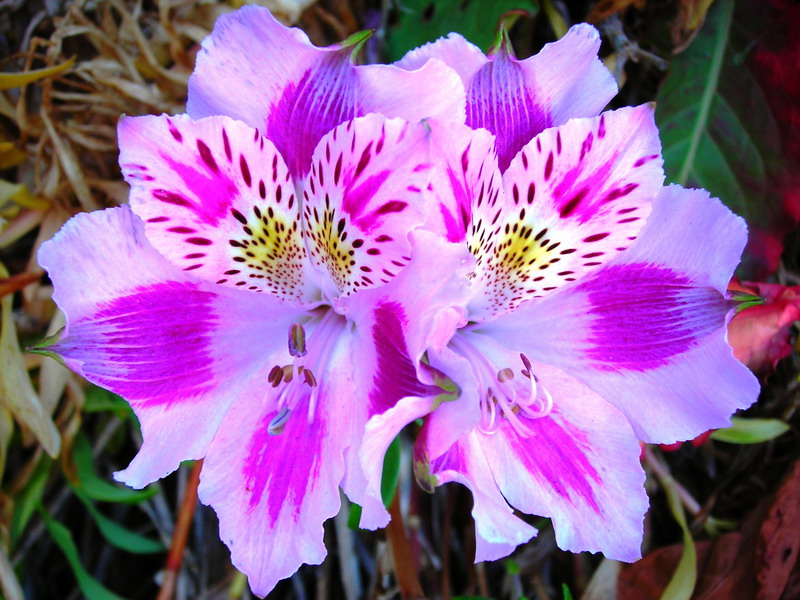
Alstroemeria pelegrina, native flora of the coastline of central Chile and the southern coast of the Coquimbo Region.

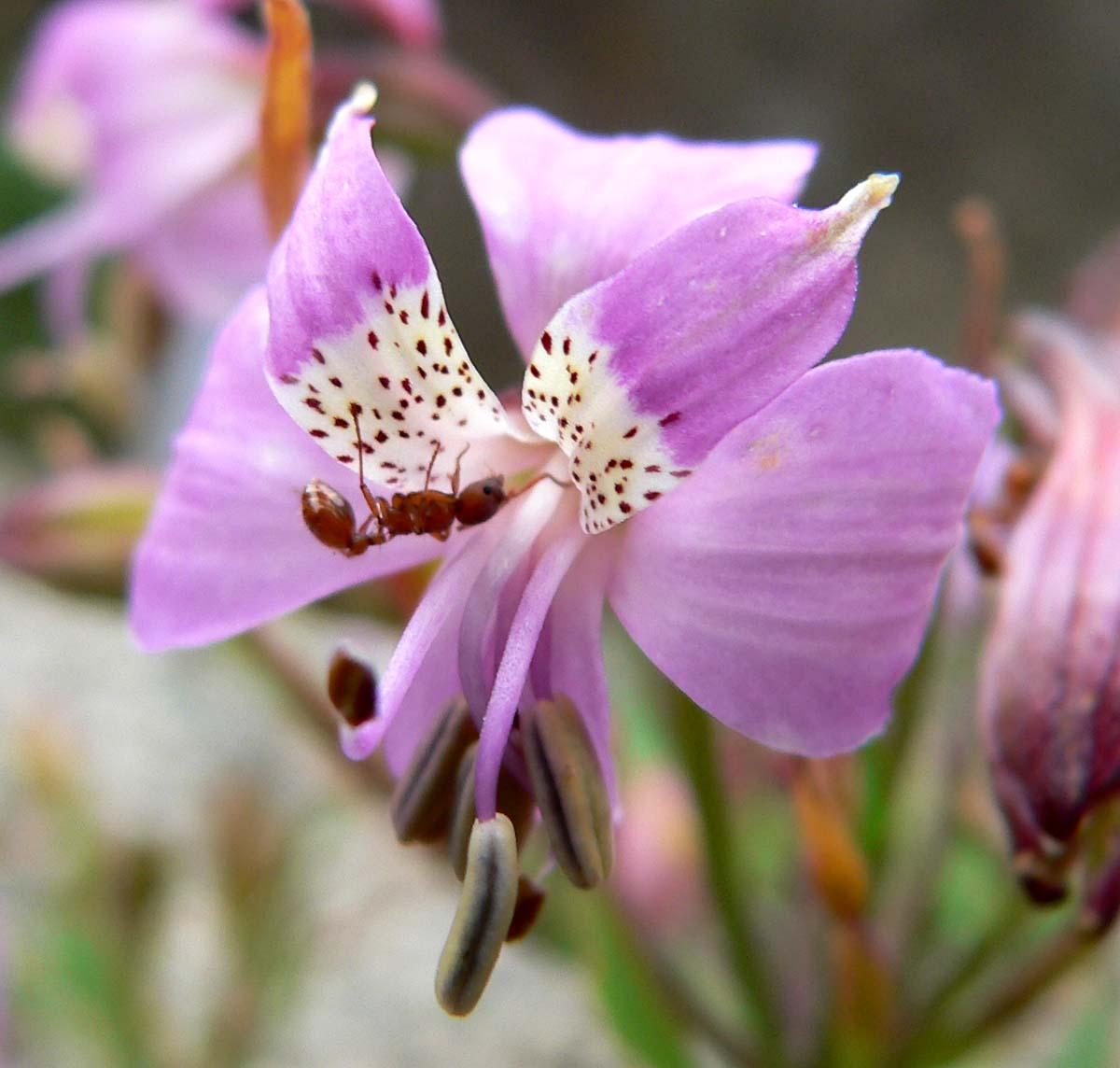
Detail of an Alstroemeria revoluta flower photographed at the University of British Columbia Botanical Garden.

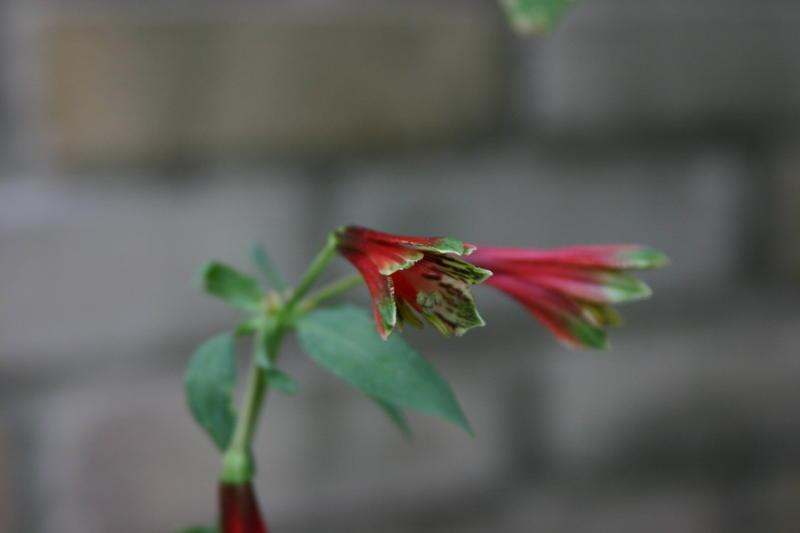
Alstroemeria psittacina (= Alstroemeria pulchella).

The exact number of species is difficult to determine because new taxa are constantly being discovered and there are also nomenclatural problems that determine that many of the names cited are actually synonymies. The following is a list of the species of the genus Alstroemeria accepted up to July 2026, in alphabetical order. For each species, the binomial name is given followed by the author, abbreviation according to convention and usage, and the valid publication. Finally, for each species, its geographic distribution is also detailed.

- Alstroemeria achirae Muñoz Schick & Brinck, Gayana, Bot. 57: 56 (2000). Chile (Maule).
- Alstroemeria albescens M.C.Assis, Novon 19(2): 145 (-147; fig. 1) (2009).
- Alstroemeria altoparadisea Ravenna, Onira 5: 17 (2000). Brazil (Goiás).
- Alstroemeria amabilis M.C.Assis, Acta Bot. Brazil. 17: 180 (2003). Southern Brazil.
- Alstroemeria amazonica Ducke, Arch. Jard. Bot. Rio de Janeiro 1: 12 (1915). Southern Venezuela to Brazil (Pará).
- Alstroemeria andina Phil., Linnaea 29: 69 (1857). Northern Chile and Argentina (San Juan province).
  - Alstroemeria andina subsp. andina. Northern Chile.
  - Alstroemeria andina subsp. venustula (Phil.) Ehr.Bayer, Gatt. Alstr. Chile: 81 (1986 publ. 1987). Northern Chile to Argentina (San Juan province). (syn.: Alstroemeria venustula Phil.)
- Alstroemeria angustifolia Herb., Amaryllidaceae: 96 (1837). Northern and central Chile.
  - Alstroemeria angustifolia subsp. angustifolia. North and Central Chile.
  - Alstroemeria angustifolia subsp. velutina Ehr.Bayer, Gatt. Alstr. Chile: 202 (1986 publ. 1987). Central Chile
- Alstroemeria annapolina Ravenna, Onira 5: 18 (2000). Brazil (Goiás).
- Alstroemeria apertiflora Baker, Handb. Amaryll.: 135 (1888). Brazil to Argentina (Misiones province).
- Alstroemeria aquidauanica Ravenna, Onira 5: 35 (2000). Brazil (Mato Grosso).
- Alstroemeria arnicana Ravenna, Onira 5: 36 (2000). Brazil (Goiás).
- Alstroemeria aulica Ravenna, Onira 4: 41 (2000). Chile (Valparaíso).
- Alstroemeria aurea Graham, Edinburgh Philos. J. 1833: 181 (1833). Central and Southern Chile to Southern Argentina.
- Alstroemeria bahiensis Ravenna, Onira 4: 37 (2000). Brazil (Bahía).
- Alstroemeria bakeri Pax, Bot. Jahrb. Syst. 11: 335 (1890). Argentina (Catamarca province).
- Alstroemeria bicentenaria Soliz, A.Fuentes & Baya, Revista Soc. Boliv. Bot.
- Alstroemeria bilabiata Ravenna, Phytologia 64: 282 (1988). Chile (Santiago Metropolitan Region).
- Alstroemeria brasiliensis Spreng., Syst. Veg. 2: 81 (1825). Midwest Brazil
- Alstroemeria burchellii Baker, J. Bot. 15: 262 (1877). Brazil (Goiás).
- Alstroemeria cabralensis Ravenna, Onira 9: 25 (2003). Brazil (Minas Gerais).
- Alstroemeria caiaponica Ravenna, Onira 5: 36 (2000). Brazil (Goiás).
- Alstroemeria calliantha M.C.Assis, Novon 19(2): 147 (-149; fig. 2) (2009)
- Alstroemeria cantillanica Ravenna, Phytologia 64: 285 (1988). Chile (O'Higgins).
- Alstroemeria capixaba M.C.Assis, Acta Bot. Brasil. 17: 180 (2003). Brazil (Espírito Santo).
- Alstroemeria caryophyllaea Jacq., Pl. Hort. Schoenbr. 4: 33, t. 465 (1804). Southeastern Brazil
- Alstroemeria chapadensis Hoehne, Relat. Commiss. Linhas Telegr. Estratég. Matto Grosso Amazonas 5: 18 (1915). Brazil (Mato Grosso).
- Alstroemeria chorillensis Herb., Edwards's Bot. Reg. 29: 64 (1843). Western Perú.
- Alstroemeria citrina Phil., Linnaea 33(3-4): 264 (1864)
- Alstroemeria crispata Phil., Linnaea 29: 70 (1857). Northern Chile.
- Alstroemeria cuiabana Ravenna, Onira 5: 18 (2000). Brazil (Mato Grosso).
- Alstroemeria cultrifolia Ravenna, Onira 5: 37 (2000). Brazil (Brasilia).
- Alstroemeria cunha Vell., Fl. Flumin. 3: 131, t. 121 (1829). Southeastern Brazil to Paraná.
- Alstroemeria decora Ravenna, Onira 4: 42 (2000). Chile (Valparaíso).
- Alstroemeria diluta Ehr.Bayer, Gatt. Alstr. Chile: 212 (1986 publ. 1987). Northern and central Chile.
  - Alstroemeria diluta subsp. chrysantha Ehr.Bayer, Gatt. Alstr. Chile: 219 (1986 publ. 1987). NC. Chile.
  - Alstroemeria diluta subsp. diluta. Central Chile.
- Alstroemeria discolor Ravenna, Onira 4: 44 (2000). Chile (Valparaíso).
- Alstroemeria douradensis Ravenna, Onira 5: 37 (2000). Brazil (Goiás).
- Alstroemeria espigonensis Ravenna, Onira 5: 19 (2000). Brazil (Bahia).
- Alstroemeria esteparica Rojas & Baeza, Gayana, Bot. 78 (2021). Chile (Aysén) and nearby Argentina.
- Alstroemeria exerens Meyen, Observ. Bot. 1: 34 (1834). Central Chile to Western Argentina.
- Alstroemeria fiebrigiana Kraenzl., Bot. Jahrb. Syst. 40: 237 (1908). Southern Bolivia.
- Alstroemeria foliosa Mart. in J.J.Roemer & J.A.Schultes, Syst. Veg. 7: 740 (1829). Southeastern Brazil to Paraguay.
- Alstroemeria fuscovinosa Ravenna, Onira 4: 34 (2000). Southeastern Brazil.
- Alstroemeria garaventae Ehr.Bayer, Gatt. Alstr. Chile: 60 (1986 publ. 1987). Central Chile.
  - Alstroemeria garaventae subsp. longaviensis Muñoz Schick et al., Gayana, Bot. 76 (2019). Chile (Maule).
- Alstroemeria gardneri Baker, J. Bot. 15: 261 (1877). Brazil.
- Alstroemeria glaucandra Ravenna, Onira 4: 41 (2000). Chile (Valparaiso).
- Alstroemeria gouveiana Ravenna, Onira 9: 26 (2003). Brazil (Minas Gerais).
- Alstroemeria graminea Phil., Anales Univ. Chile 93: 161 (1896). Northern Chile.
- Alstroemeria hookeri Sweet, Hort. Brit.: 408 (1826). Central and Southern Chile.
  - Alstroemeria hookeri subsp. cummingiana (Herb.) Ehr.Bayer, Gatt. Alstr. Chile: 189 (1986 publ. 1987). Central Chile.
  - Alstroemeria hookeri subsp. hookeri. Southern and central Chile.
  - Alstroemeria hookeri subsp. maculata Ehr.Bayer, Gatt. Alstr. Chile: 184 (1986 publ. 1987). Central Chile.
- Alstroemeria huemulina Ravenna, Phytologia 64: 285 (1988). Chile (Biobío).
- Alstroemeria ibitipocae Ravenna, Onira 4: 35 (2000). Brazil (Minas Gerais).
- Alstroemeria igarapavica Ravenna, Onira 4: 36 (2000). Brazil (São Paulo).
- Alstroemeria inodora Herb., Amaryllidaceae: 90 (1837). Southeastern and Southern Brazil.
- Alstroemeria isabellana Herb., Amaryllidaceae: 88 (1837). Southeastern and Southern Brazil and Northeast Argentina.
- Alstroemeria itabiritensis Ravenna, Onira 5: 20 (2000). Brazil (Minas Gerais).
- Alstroemeria itatiaica Ravenna, Onira 5: 38 (2000). Brazil (Río de Janeiro).
- Alstroemeria jocunda Ravenna, Phytologia 64: 284 (1988). Chile (Santiago).
- Alstroemeria julieae M.C.Assis, Revista Brasil. Bot. 25: 177 (2002). Brazil (Minas Gerais).
- Alstroemeria kingii Phil., Anales Univ. Chile 1873: 548 (1873). Northern Chile.
- Alstroemeria lactilutea Ravenna & Brinck, Onira 5: 23 (2000). Chile (Tarapacá Region).
- Alstroemeria landimana Ravenna, Onira 9: 26 (2003). Brazil (Brasilia).
- Alstroemeria leporina Ehr.Bayer & Grau, Mitt. Bot. Staatssamml. München 18: 222 (1982). Northern Chile.
- Alstroemeria ligtu L., Pl. Alströmeria: 10 (1762). Peru to central Chile and western Argentina.
  - Alstroemeria ligtu subsp. incarnata Ehr.Bayer, Gatt. Alstr. Chile: 156 (1986 publ. 1987). Central Chile to western Argentina.
  - Alstroemeria ligtu subsp. ligtu. Perú to central Chile.
  - Alstroemeria ligtu subsp. simsii (Spreng.) Ehr.Bayer, Gatt. Alstr. Chile: 144 (1986 publ. 1987). Central Chile.
  - Alstroemeria ligtu subsp. splendens Muñoz-Schick, Not. Mens. Mus. Nac. Hist. Nat. 352: 22 (2003). Chile (Maule).

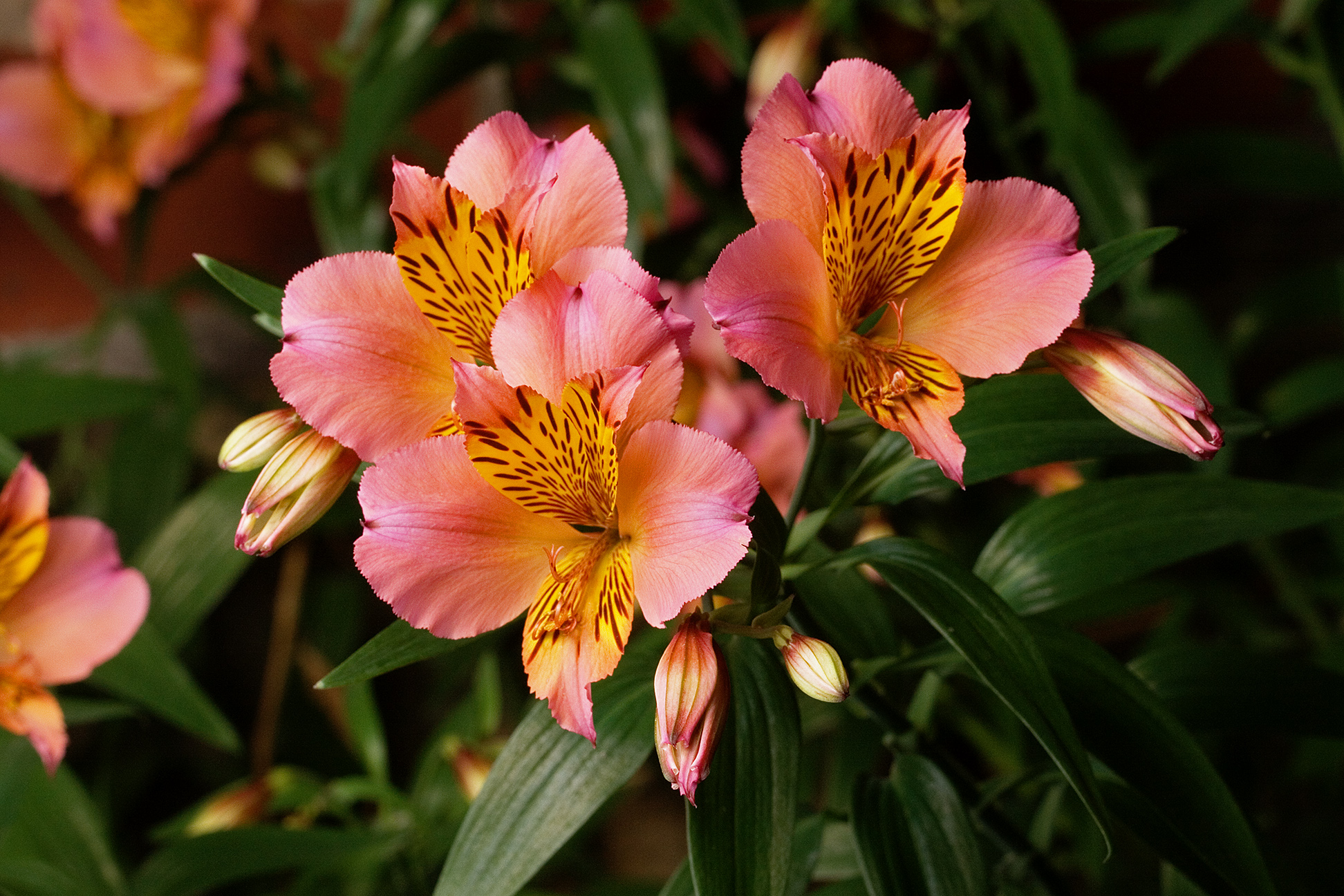
The genus Alstroemeria is the source of a large number of ornamental cultivars. The image shows the flowers of the cultivar 'Saturne' of Alstroemeria aurea.

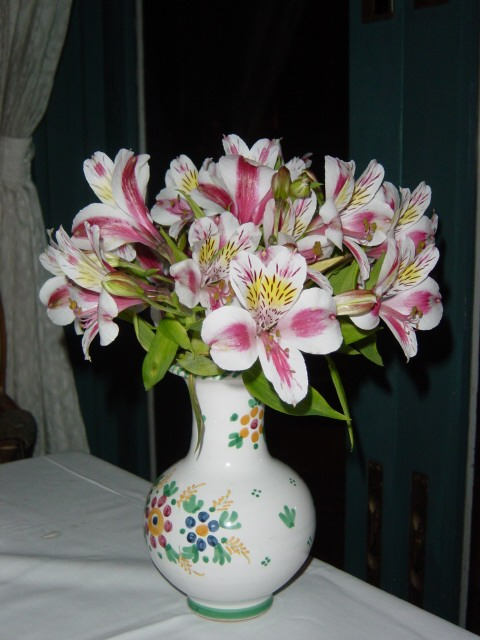
Flowers of the different cultivars of Alstroemeria are used as cut flowers all over the world.

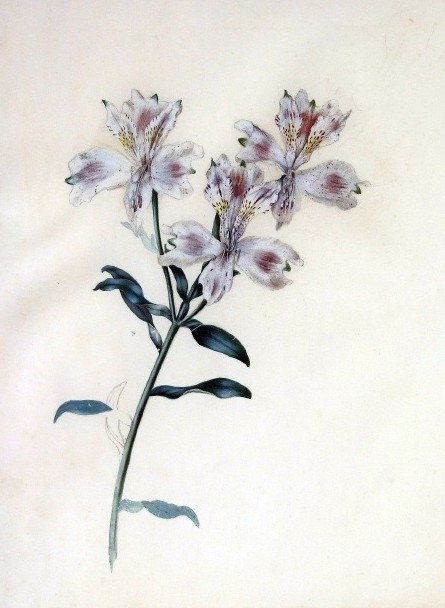
A watercolor of Alstroemeria flowers, painted in 1808 by Sarah Rhodes (1787-1862), an amateur botanical artist.

- Alstroemeria litterata Ravenna, Onira 5: 39 (2000). Brazil (Mato Grosso).
- Alstroemeria longistaminea Mart. in J.J.Roemer & J.A.Schultes, Syst. Veg. 7: 739 (1829). Northeast Brazil.
- Alstroemeria longistyla Schenk in C.F.P.von Martius & auct. suc. (eds.), Fl. Bras. 3(1): 173 (1855). Brazil (Goiás to Minas Gerais).
- Alstroemeria lutea Muñoz Schick, Gayana, Bot. 57: 55 (2000). Chile (Tarapacá).
- Alstroemeria magna Ravenna, Phytologia 64: 284 (1988). Chile (Valparaíso).
- Alstroemeria magnifica Herb., Edwards's Bot. Reg. 29: 64 (1843). Central Chile.
  - Alstroemeria magnifica subsp. gayana (Phil.) Ehr.Bayer, Gatt. Alstr. Chile: 252 (1986 publ. 1987). Central Chile.
  - Alstroemeria magnifica var. magenta (Ehr.Bayer) Muñoz-Schick, Not. Mens. Mus. Nac. Hist. Nat. 352: 22 (2003). Chile (Coquimbo).
  - Alstroemeria magnifica subsp. magnifica. Central Chile.
  - Alstroemeria magnifica subsp. maxima (Phil.) Ehr.Bayer, Gatt. Alstr. Chile: 244 (1986 publ. 1987). Central Chile.
  - Alstroemeria magnifica var. tofoensis Muñoz-Schick, Not. Mens. Mus. Nac. Hist. Nat. 352: 22 (2003). Chile (Coquimbo).
- Alstroemeria malmeana Kraenzl., Bot. Jahrb. Syst. 50(112): 3 (1913). Southern Brasil.
- Alstroemeria maranhensis M.C.Assis & A.W.C.Ferreira, Acta Bot. Brasil.
- Alstroemeria marticorenae Negritto & C.M.Baeza, Syst. Bot.
- Alstroemeria maxima (Phil.) N.I.Villalobos & C.M.Baeza Brazil. J. Bot.
- Alstroemeria modesta Phil., Anales Univ. Chile 93: 161 (1896). Northern Chile.
- Alstroemeria mollensis Muñoz-Schick & Brinck, Gayana, Bot. 60: 102 (2003). Chile (Coquimbo).
- Alstroemeria monantha Ravenna, Phytologia 64: 286 (1988). Northern and central Chile.
- Alstroemeria monticola Mart. in J.J.Roemer & J.A.Schultes, Syst. Veg. 7: 739 (1829). Brazil (Bahía, Minas Gerais).
- Alstroemeria nidularis Ravenna, Phytologia 64: 282 (1988). Chile (Maule).
- Alstroemeria nivea Ravenna, Onira 9: 28 (2003). Chile (Coquimbo).
- Alstroemeria ochracea M.C.Assis, Revista Brasil. Bot. 25: 178 (2002). Brazil (Minas Gerais).
- Alstroemeria orchidioides Meerow, Tombolato & F.K.Mey., Brittonia 51: 442 (1999). Brazil (Brasilia, Goiás).
- Alstroemeria oreas Schauer, Nov. Actorum Acad. Caes. Leop.-Carol. Nat. Cur. 19(Suppl. 1): 440 (1843). Chile (San Fernando mountains).
- Alstroemeria pallida Graham, Edinburgh New Philos. J. 7: 344 (1829). Central Chile to west Argentina.
- Alstroemeria paraensis M.C.Assis, Brittonia 58: 267 (2006). Brazil (Pará).
- Alstroemeria parvula Phil., Linnaea 33: 261 (1864).
- Alstroemeria patagonica Phil., Anales Univ. Chile 93: 160 (1896). Southern Argentina to Southern Chile.
- Alstroemeria paupercula Phil., Fl. Atacam.: 51 (1860). Peru to Northern Chile.
- Alstroemeria pelegrina L., Pl. Alströmeria: 10 (1762). Peru to central Chile.
- Alstroemeria penduliflora M.C.Assis, Revista Brasil. Bot. 25: 178 (2002). Brazil (Minas Gerais).
- Alstroemeria philippii Baker, Handb. Amaryll.: 140 (1888). Northern Chile.
- Alstroemeria piauhyensis Gardner ex Baker, Handb. Amaryll.: 136 (1888). Northeast Brazil.
- Alstroemeria piperata A.R.Flores & J.M.Watson, Int. Rock Gard.
- Alstroemeria plantaginea Mart. in J.J.Roemer & J.A.Schultes, Syst. Veg. 7: 737 (1829). Brazil (Bahía a São Paulo).
- Alstroemeria poetica Ravenna, Phytologia 64: 285 (1988). Northern Chile.
- Alstroemeria polpaicana Ravenna, Phytologia 64: 283 (1988). Chile (Santiago).
- Alstroemeria polyphylla Phil., Anales Univ. Chile 93: 160 (1896). Central Chile.
- Alstroemeria presliana Herb., Amaryllidaceae: 95 (1837). Central Chile to western Argentina.
  - Alstroemeria presliana subsp. australis Ehr.Bayer, Gatt. Alstr. Chile: 122 (1986 publ. 1987). Central Chile.
  - Alstroemeria presliana subsp. presliana. Central Chile to west Argentina.
- Alstroemeria pseudospathulata Ehr.Bayer, Gatt. Alstr. Chile: 47 (1986 publ. 1987). Central Chile to western Argentina.
- Alstroemeria psittacina Lehm., Cat. Hort. Hamb. (1826) ex Schult. f. Syst. vii. 739.
- Alstroemeria pubiflora Ravenna, Onira 5: 21 (2000). Brazil (Goiás).
- Alstroemeria pudica Ravenna, Onira 4: 43 (2000). Chile (Santiago).
- Alstroemeria pulchra Sims, Bot. Mag. 50: t. 2421 (1823). Central Chile.
  - Alstroemeria pulchra subsp. lavandulacea Ehr.Bayer, Gatt. Alstr. Chile: 230 (1986 publ. 1987). Southern Chile.
  - Alstroemeria pulchra subsp. pulchra. Chile.
- Alstroemeria punctata Ravenna, Onira 4: 33 (2000). Brazil (Brasilia, Goiás).
- Alstroemeria pygmaea Herb., Amaryllidaceae: 100 (1837). Peru to Northeast Argentina.
- Alstroemeria radula Dusén, Arq. Mus. Nac. Rio de Janeiro 13: 103 (1905). Southeast Brazil.
- Alstroemeria recumbens Herb., Amaryllidaceae: 97 (1837). Northern and central Chile.
- Alstroemeria revoluta Ruiz & Pav., Fl. Peruv. 3: 59 (1802). Central Chile.
- Alstroemeria ribeirensis Ravenna, Onira 9: 27 (2003). Brazil (Paraná).
- Alstroemeria roseoviridis Ravenna, Onira 5: 22 (2000). Brazil (Mato Grosso do Sul).
- Alstroemeria rupestris M.C.Assis, Revista Brasil. Bot. 25: 180 (2002). Brazil (Minas Gerais).
- Alstroemeria sabulosa Ravenna, Phytologia 64: 281 (1988). Chile (Valparaíso).
- Alstroemeria schizanthoides Grau, Mitt. Bot. Staatssamml. München 18: 213 (1982). Northern Chile.
- Alstroemeria sellowiana Seub. in C.F.P.von Martius & auct. suc. (eds.), Fl. Bras. 3(1): 173 (1855). Southern Brazil.
- Alstroemeria spathulata C.Presl, Reliq. Haenk. 2: 122 (1833). Central Chile to west Argentina.
- Alstroemeria speciosa M.C.Assis, Taxon 53: 184 (2004). Brazil (São Paulo).
- Alstroemeria spectabilis Ravenna, Phytologia 64: 284 (1988). Chile (Santiago).
- Alstroemeria stenopetala Seub. in C.F.P.von Martius & auct. suc. (eds.), Fl. Bras. 3(1): 174 (1855). Brazil (Goiás to Minas Gerais).
- Alstroemeria stenophylla M.C.Assis, Novon 14: 17 (2004). Brazil (Goiás a Minas Gerais).
- Alstroemeria stramonia M.C.Assis & Mello-Silva, Phytotaxa 282(1): 24 (2016).
- Alstroemeria talcaensis Ravenna, Onira 4: 40 (2000). Chile (Maule).
- Alstroemeria timida Ravenna, Phytologia 64: 281 (1988). Chile (Santiago).
- Alstroemeria tombolatoana M.C.Assis, Novon 14: 19 (2004). Brazil (Mato Grosso, Goiás).
- Alstroemeria traudliae J.M.Watson & A.R.Flores, Fl. Silvest. Chile, Desierto Fl. 1: 118, fig. 24 (2015).
- Alstroemeria umbellata Meyen, Observ. Bot. 1: 356 (1834). Central Argentina to central Chile.
- Alstroemeria urubiciensis L.P.Felix & M.Guerra, Phytotaxa 687(2): 281 (2025).
- Alstroemeria variegata M.C.Assis, Revista Brasil. Bot. 25: 180 (2002). Brasil (Minas Gerais).
- Alstroemeria versicolor Ruiz & Pav., Fl. Peruv. 3: 59 (1802). Central Chile.
- Alstroemeria virginalis Ravenna & Brinck, Onira 5: 40 (2000). Chile (Coquimbo).
- Alstroemeria viridiflora Warm., Vidensk. Meddel. Naturhist. Foren. Kjøbenhavn 1872: 113 (1872). West of Brazil to Minas Gerais.
- Alstroemeria werdermannii Ehr.Bayer, Gatt. Alstr. Chile: 87 (1986 publ. 1987). Norte de Chile.
  - Alstroemeria werdermannii var. flavicans Muñoz Schick, Gayana, Bot. 57: 57 (2000). Chile (Atacama region).
  - Alstroemeria werdermannii var. werdermannii. Northern Chile (Atacama region).
- Alstroemeria xavantinensis Ravenna, Onira 4: 39 (2000). Brazil (Mato Grosso).
- Alstroemeria yaelae Ravenna, Phytologia 64: 282 (1988). Chile (Santiago).
- Alstroemeria zoellneri Ehr.Bayer, Gatt. Alstr. Chile: 297 (1986 publ. 1987). Central Chile.

== Taxa of hybrid origin (nothospecies) ==
The nothospecies of the genus, that is, those taxa that have been shown to owe their origin to hybridization between two different species (for example, Alstroemeria × davisiae which is the hybrid between A. pelegrina and A. pulchella) are listed below together with their parental species where these are known:

- Alstroemeria × davisiae D.D.Duncan ex Traub, Pl. Life 34: 94 (1978). A. pelegrina × A. pulchella.
- Alstroemeria × errembaultii Lem., Fl. Serres Jard. Eur. 3: 262 (1847).
- Alstroemeria × orpetiae Traub, Pl. Life 28: 67 (1972). A. pelegrina × A. violacea.
- Alstroemeria × racinae Traub, Pl. Life 28: 67 (1972). A. caryophyllaea × A. pulchella.
- Alstroemeria × zebrina D.D.Duncan, Pl. Life 38: 56 (1982). A. brasiliensis × A. pulchella.

== Synonymy ==
The following names are considered synonyms of Alstroemeria:

- Ligtu Adans., Fam. Pl. 2: 20 (1763).
- Lilavia Raf., Fl. Tellur. 4: 35 (1838).
- Priopetalon Raf., Fl. Tellur. 4: 34 (1838).
- Schickendantzia Pax, Bot. Jahrb. Syst. 11: 322 (1889).
- Taltalia Ehr.Bayer, Sendtnera 5: 7 (1998).
