= Alstroemeria pulchella =

Alstroemeria pulchella is a scientific name that may refer to the following plants commonly referred to as Peruvian lilies:

- Alstroemeria pulchella H.Vilm. (1866) — synonym of A. aurea
- Alstroemeria pulchella L.f. (1782) — synonym of A. pelegrina
- Alstroemeria pulchella L.f. (1782) — a misapplied name of A. psittacina, the New Zealand Christmas bell
- Alstroemeria pulchella Sims (1822) — synonym of A. ligtu subsp. simsii
