= Claude Gay =

French botanist, naturalist and illustrator

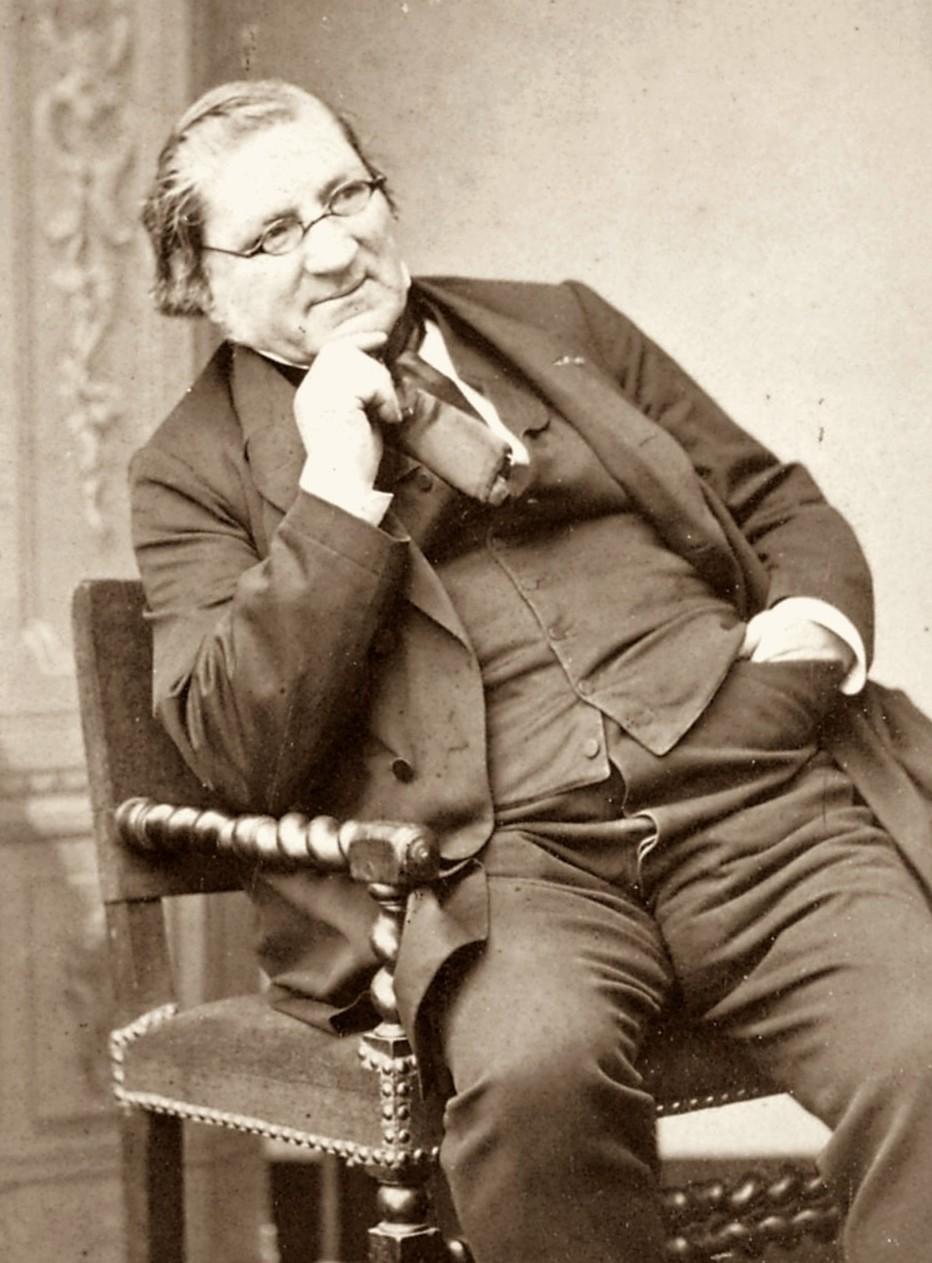
- Born: 18 March 1800; Draguignan, France
- Died: 29 November 1873 (aged 73); Flayosc, France
- Scientific career
- Fields: Botany, geology, history, zoology

Claude Gay, often named Claudio Gay in Spanish texts, (18 March 1800 – 29 November 1873), was a French botanist, naturalist and illustrator. This explorer carried out some of the first investigations about Chilean flora, fauna, geology and geography. The Cordillera Claudio Gay in the Atacama Region of Chile is named after him. He founded the Chilean National Museum of Natural History, its first director was another Frenchman Jean-François Dauxion-Lavaysse. The standard author abbreviation Gay is used to indicate this person as the author when citing a botanical name.

== Research and travels ==
Gay first went to Paris to study medicine, but he quickly abandoned this idea to become a researcher in natural history. In 1828, he went to Chile to teach physics and natural history at a college in Santiago. In 1829, he accepted a position as a researcher for the Chilean government to carry out a scientific survey of the country.

He returned to France in 1832, and gave his collections to the Muséum national d'histoire naturelle in Paris. His botanical specimens can now be found throughout the world, including at the National Herbarium of Victoria (MEL), Royal Botanic Gardens Victoria.

He returned to Chile in 1834 and explored the country again for four years. After having visited Peru in 1839, he lived in Santiago, where he wrote the multi-volume Historia fisica y politica de Chile. In 1841, Chile conferred the Chilean nationality to him, and his opus work was published by the Chilean government between 1844 and 1871.

Gay returned to France in 1843, and in May, 1856, he was elected a member of the French Academy of Sciences. He made a journey through Russia and Tartary from 1856 to 1858. At the end of 1858, he was sent by the French Academy of Sciences to study the mining system of the United States. He returned to France in 1860, and in 1863, he journeyed to Chile for the last time.

== Honours ==
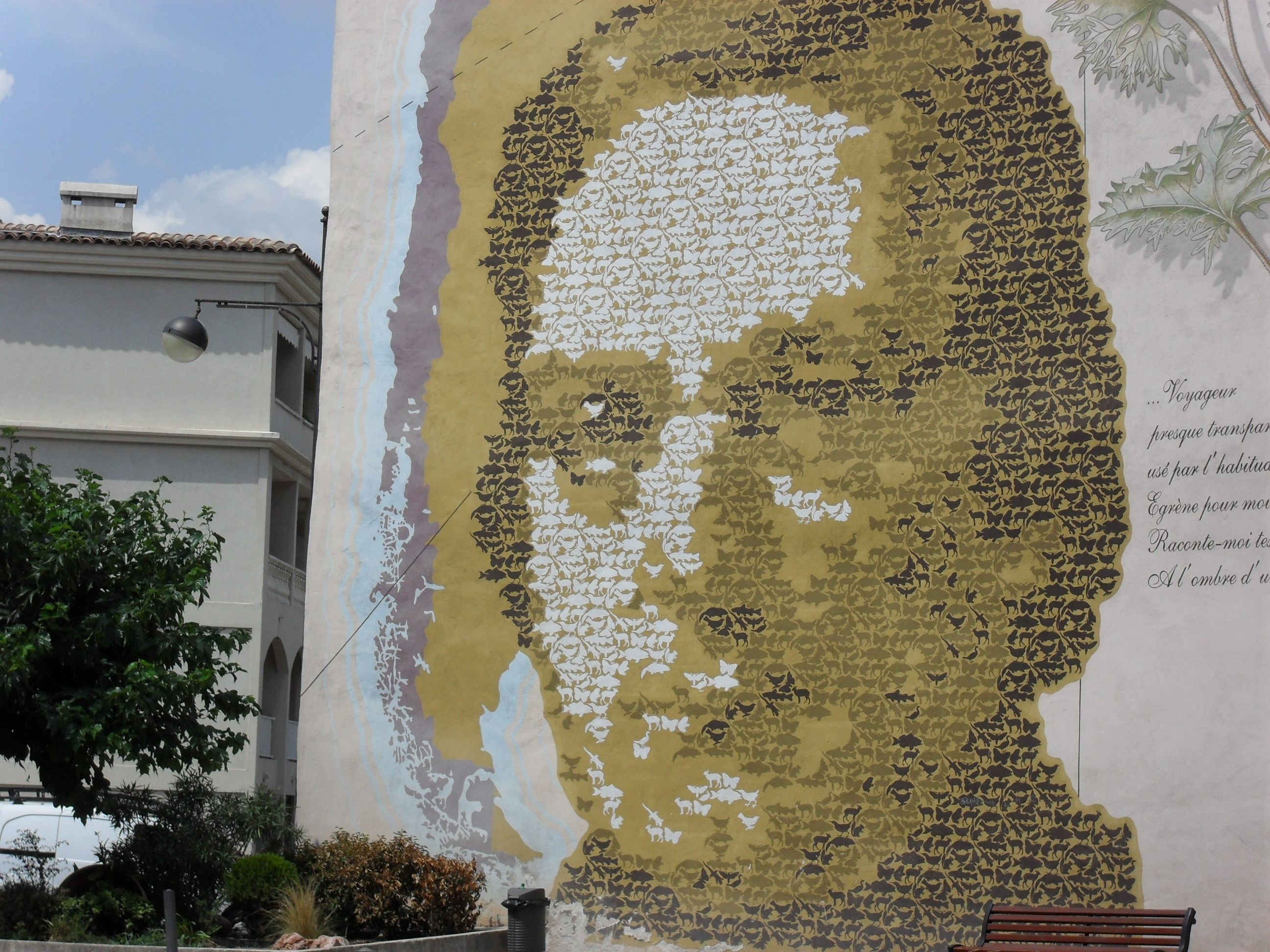
Portray of Claude Gay in Draguignan.

- Awarded Grande Médaille d'Or des Explorations by the Société de Géographie, 1845
- Titular of the French Légion d'honneur
- Corresponding member of the Muséum national d'histoire naturelle (Paris)
- Elected to the French Academy of Sciences in 1856.

He is commemorated in the name of a number of plants and animals, including the lichen Degelia gayana, the flowering plant Montiopsis gayana, the rufous-bellied seedsnipe Attagis gayi.

The journal of the Botanical Society of Chile, Gayana. Botánica, is named in his honour and published by the Universidad de Concepción, Chile.

== Works ==
- Noticias sobre las islas de Juan Fernandez, Valparaiso, 1840
- Historia física y política de Chile, Paris, 1844–1848
- Origine de la pomme de terre, Paris, 1851
- Atlas de la historia física y política de Chile, Paris, 1854
- Triple variation de l'aiguille d'amiante dans les parties Ouest de l'Amerique, Paris, 1854
- Carte générale du Chili, Paris, 1855
- Considérations sur les mines du Pérou, comparées aux mines du Chili, Paris, 1855
- Notes sur le Brasil, Buenos Ayres, et Rio de Janeiro, Paris, 1856
- Rapport à l'académie des sciences sur les mines des États-Unis, Paris, 1861

== Sources ==
- Marie-Louise Bauchot, Jacques Daget & Roland Bauchot, «Ichthyology in France at the Beginning of the 19th Century: The “Histoire Naturelle des Poissons“ of Cuvier (1769–1832) and Valenciennes (1794–1865)» in Collection building in ichthyology and herpetology, T.W. Pietsch, W. D. Anderson (dir.), American Society of Ichthyologists and Herpetologists, 1997: 27-80.
