= Menmuir =

Coordinates: 56.768806°N 2.767259°W

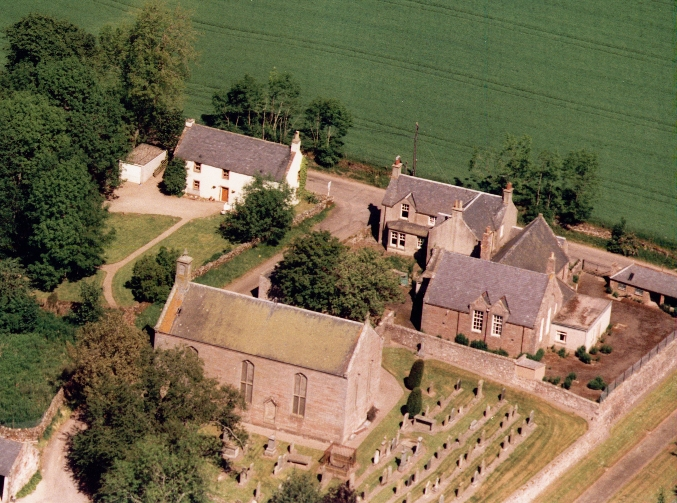
- Kirkton of Menmuir

- Location within Angus
- Population: approx. 250
- OS grid reference: NO532644
- Council area: Angus
- Lieutenancy area: Angus
- Country: Scotland
- Sovereign state: United Kingdom
- Post town: BRECHIN
- Postcode district: DD9
- Dialling code: 01356
- Police: Scotland
- Fire: Scottish
- Ambulance: Scottish
- UK Parliament: Angus
- Scottish Parliament: Angus North and Mearns

Menmuir is a parish in the county of Angus in Scotland.

Kirkton of Menmuir consists of only three houses (the Old Schoolhouse, the Manse, the Old Inn) and for this reason is referred to locally as "twa hooses and another yin," but around 250 people live in the area and the community hall is well used.

== History ==
Neolithic cup and ring marked stones have been found in the area. Bronze Age archaeology has been found nearby, with a short cist burial found a mile to the south-east of the village, containing bones and a flint spearhead, and a bronze axehead found nearby. The Brown Caterthun and the White Caterthun, hillforts dating from the Iron Age, can also be seen nearby.

A number of Pictish symbol stones have been found in Menmuir, including a cross-slab and a sculptured stone found in the kirkyard around 1844 when an old wall was demolished, three fragments, found in the grounds of the village Manse in 1943, and another class III fragment reported in 1986. These point to Menmuir having been a centre of some ecclesiastical importance in the early medieval period.

A royal palace is supposed to have existed in Menmuir in the reign of Alexander III, a little to the south-west of where the church now stands. However, no remains of it have been found.

== Geography ==
Menmuir straddles the boundary of the fertile coastal land and the start of the Grampian Mountains. The unusual surname Menmuir seems to originate from this parish.

== Famous residents ==
John Lindsay of Balcarres, Lord Menmuir was the laird of Menmuir and James Irvine was a Scottish portrait-painter born here in 1822.
