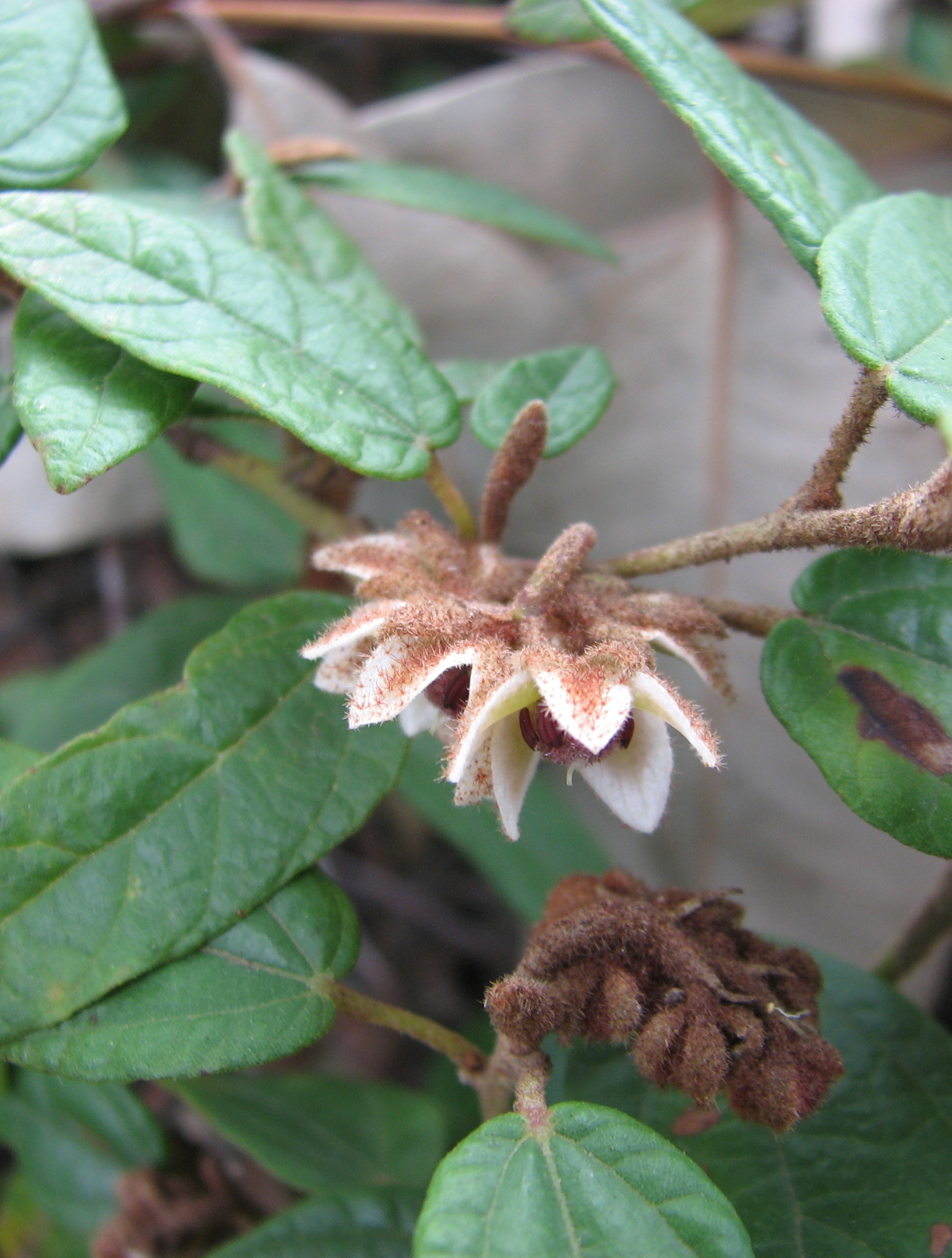
- Lasiopetalum macrophyllum in Maranoa Gardens

Scientific classification
- Kingdom: Plantae
- Clade: Tracheophytes
- Clade: Angiosperms
- Clade: Eudicots
- Clade: Rosids
- Order: Malvales
- Family: Malvaceae
- Genus: Lasiopetalum
- Species: L. macrophyllum

Binomial name
- Lasiopetalum macrophyllum Graham

Synonyms
- Lasiopetalum dasyphyllum Hook.f. nom. inval., nom. nud.; Lasiopetalum dasyphyllum Sieber ex Steetz; Lasiopetalum gunnii Steetz; Lasiopetalum macrophyllum Graham isonym; Lasiopetalum wilhelmi Benth. orth. var.; Lasiopetalum wilhelmii F.Muell.

= Lasiopetalum macrophyllum =

Shrubby velvet bush

Species of shrub

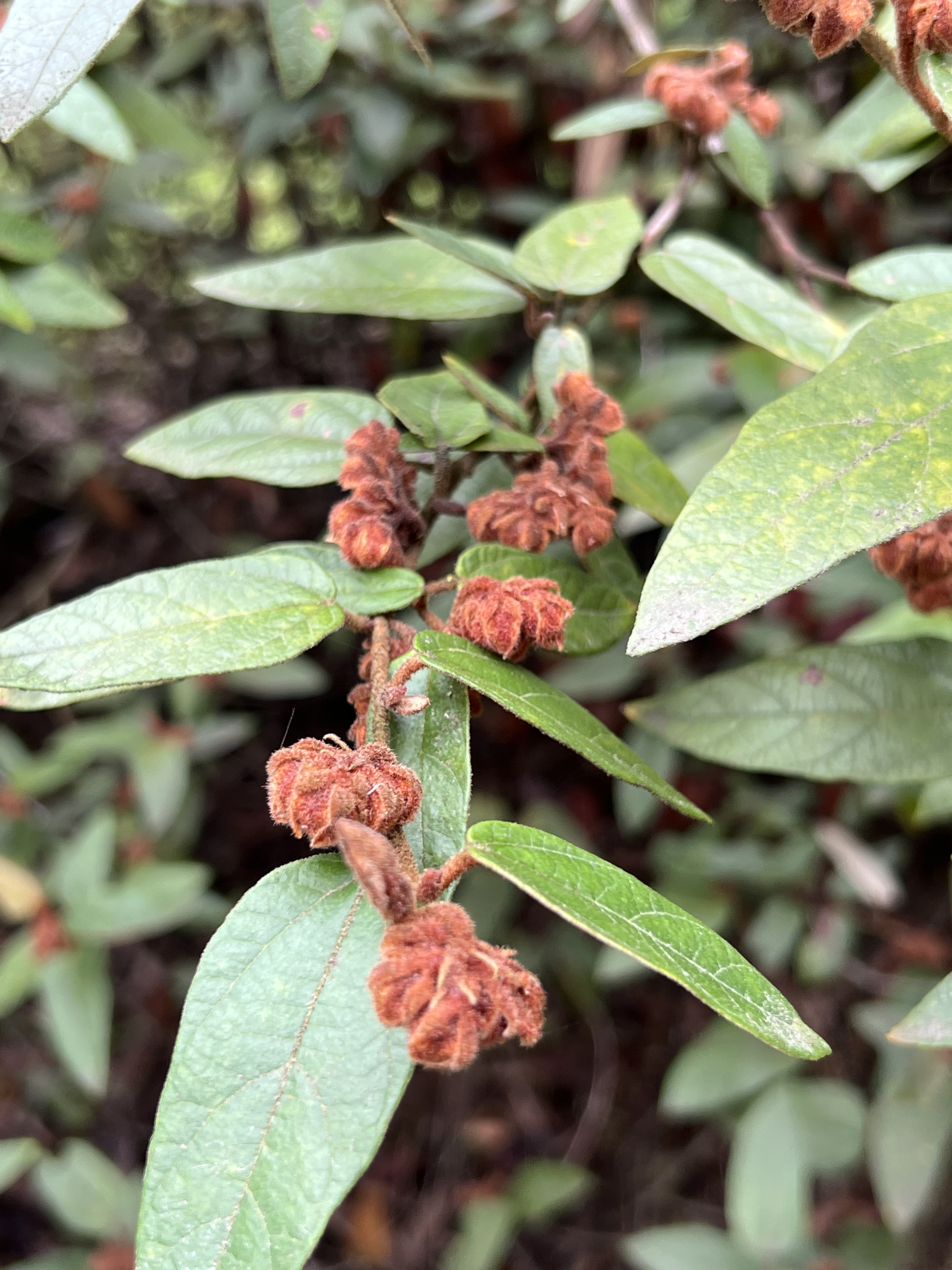
Foliage and buds

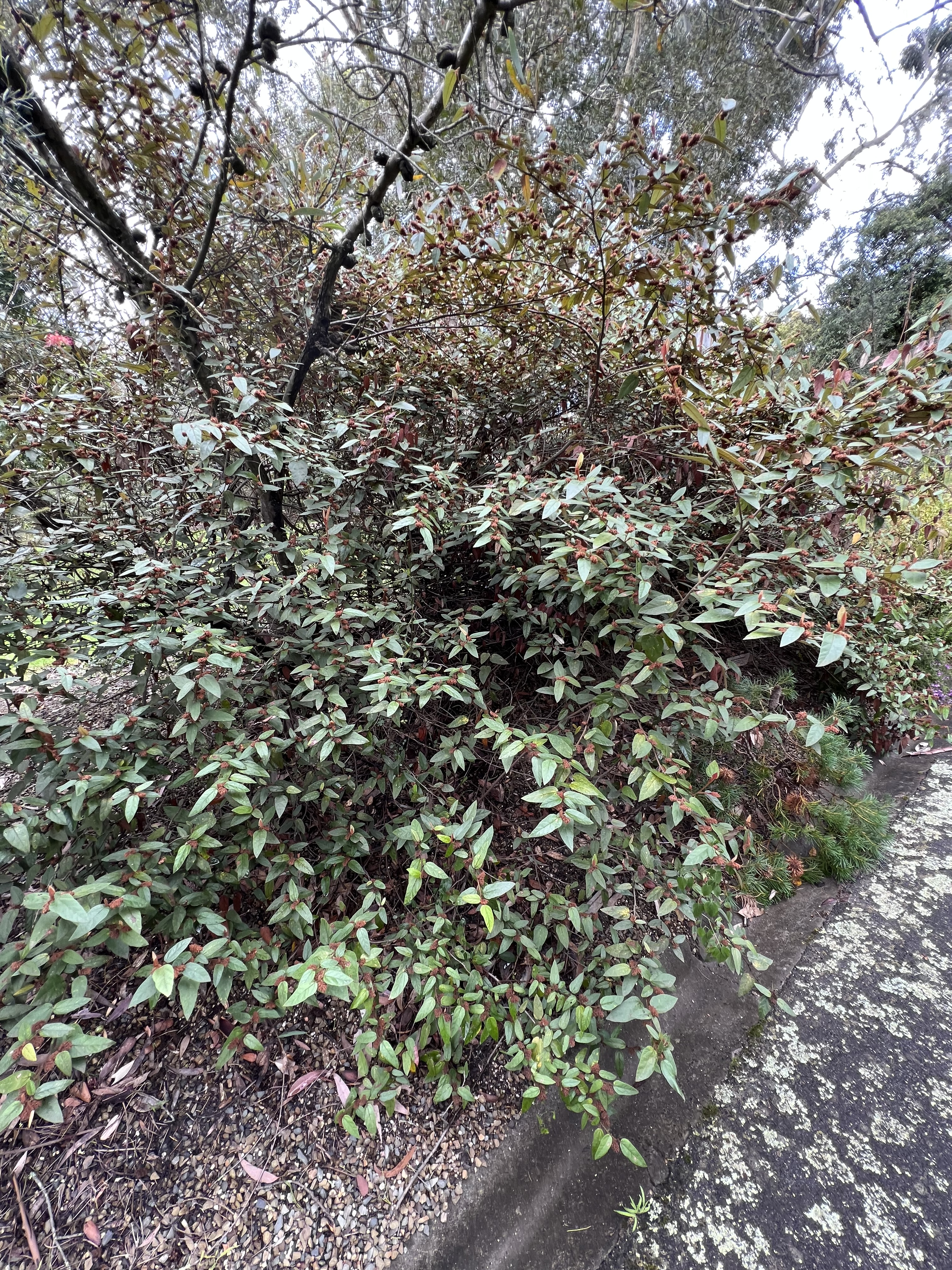
Habit

Lasiopetalum macrophyllum, commonly known as shrubby velvet bush, is a species of flowering plant in the family Malvaceae and is endemic to south-eastern Australia. It is a shrub with egg-shaped to lance-shaped with rust-coloured hairs on the lower surface, and woolly-hairy, cream-coloured and reddish flowers.

== Description ==
Lasiopetalum macrophyllum is an erect or straggling, often untidy shrub typically 1–3 m (3 ft 3 in – 9 ft 10 in) high and up to 4 m (13 ft) wide. Its leaves are egg-shaped to lance-shaped with a heart-shaped base, 25–130 mm (0.98–5.12 in) long and 10–70 mm (0.39–2.76 in) wide on a petiole 5–20 mm (0.20–0.79 in) long. The upper surface of the leaves is more or less glabrous and the lower surface is covered with rust-coloured hairs. The flowers are borne in crowded groups of six to twelve and are covered with woolly, rust-coloured hairs with lance-shaped bracteoles about 5–6 mm (0.20–0.24 in) long below the base of the sepals. The petal-like sepals are cream-coloured, 6–8 mm (0.24–0.31 in) long, the petals reddish and less than 1 mm (0.039 in) long and the anthers about 2 mm (0.079 in) long. Flowering mainly occurs from September to December.

This lasiopetalum is distinguished from the similar L. ferrugineum by the hairless inner surface of the sepals.

== Taxonomy ==
Lasiopetalum macrophyllum was first formally described in 1841 by Scottish botanist Robert Graham in the Edinburgh New Philosophical Journal from plants grown in the United Kingdom from seeds collected in New South Wales by Richard Cunningham. The specific epithet (macrophyllum) means "large-leaved".

== Distribution and habitat ==
Shrubby velvet bush grows in forest and woodland, often amongst rocks and near watercourses and occurs on the coast and tablelands of New South Wales, mainly east of Erica and in the Grampians in Victoria, in near-coastal areas of eastern and north-western Tasmania and on some Bass Strait islands.

== Use in horticulture ==
Lasiopetalum macrophyllum was introduced to cultivation in England in 1835. Its flushes of rust-coloured new growth have some ornamental appeal, and it grows fairly readily in part-shade in the garden, and is propagated by seed or cutting. Forms with more attractive new growth and prostrate habit have been selected for the garden. It grows in well-drained soils in sun or part shade and is frost tolerant. It has also been classified as somewhat fire retardant.
