= James Irvine (painter) =

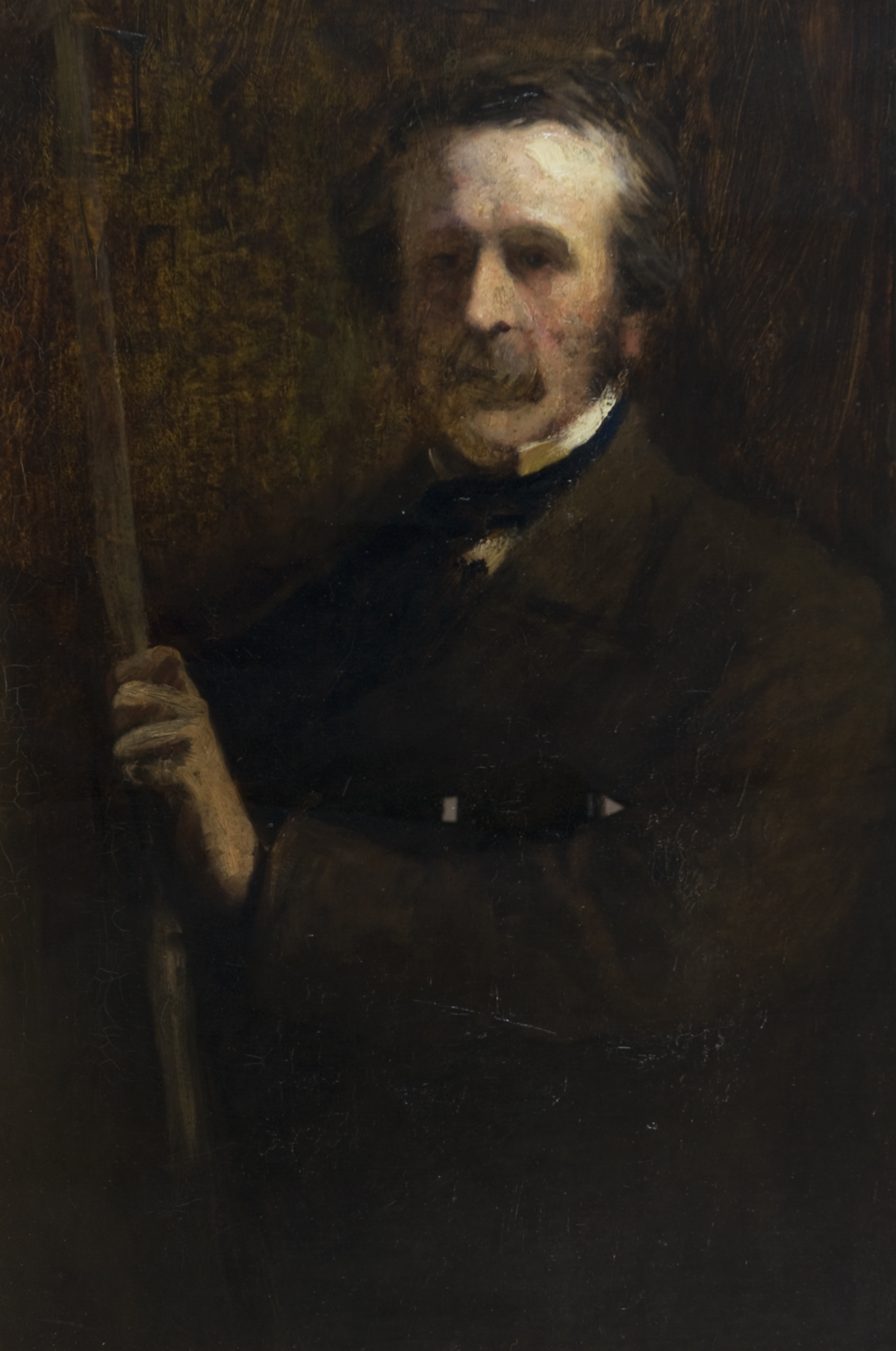
- Self-portrait
- Born: 1822; Menmuir, Forfarshire
- Died: 17 March 1889 (aged 66–67); Montrose

James Irvine (1822 – 17 March 1889) was a Scottish portraitist.

== Life ==
Irvine was born in Menmuir, Forfarshire in 1822. He was the eldest son of John Irvine and was educated at the local parish school. He was a pupil of the Scottish portrait painter Colvin Smith at Brechin.

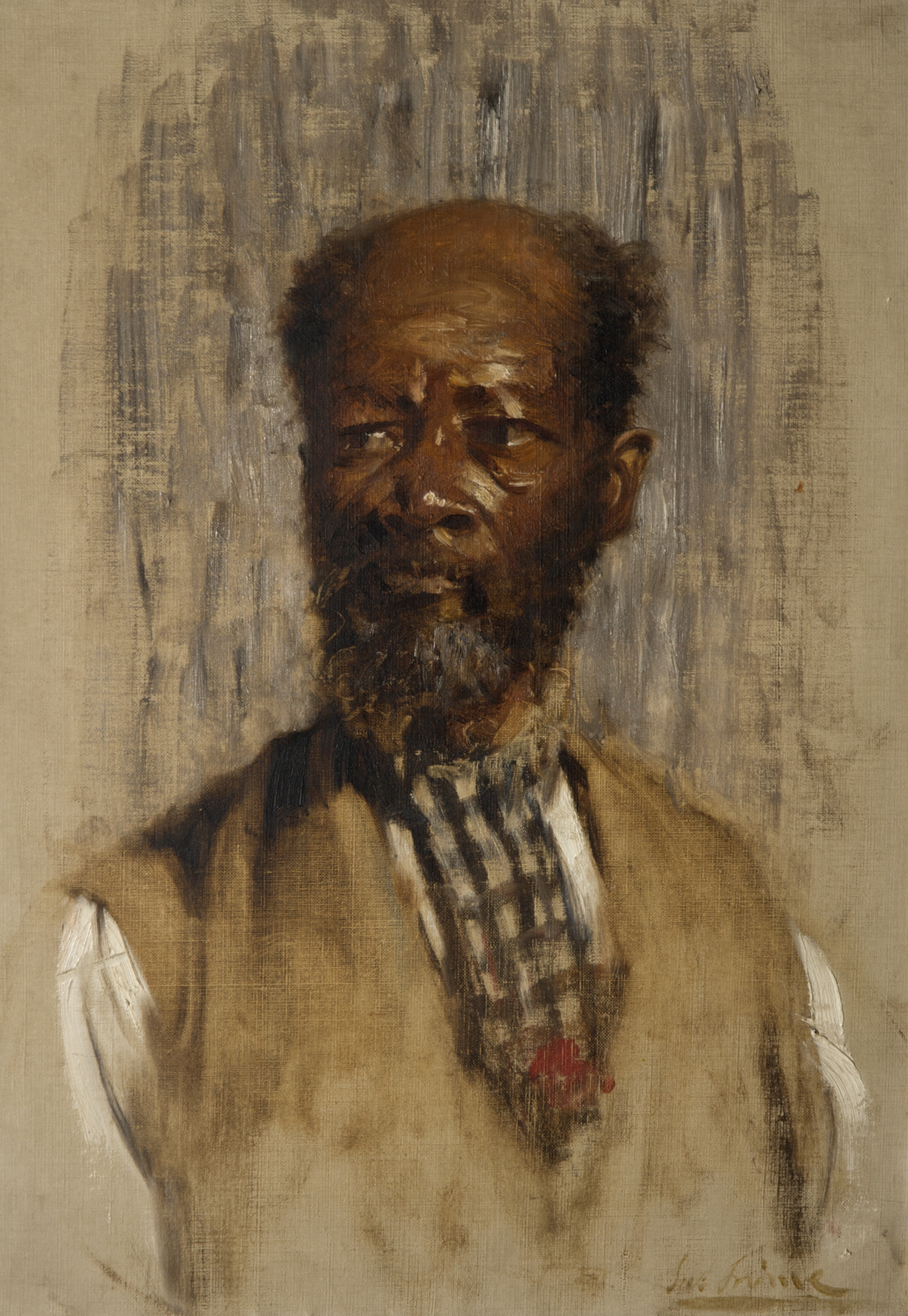
Louis Black: (Scottish ex-slave) by James Irvine

Irvine was able to gain paid experience by painting the "old retainers" on Mr. Carnegy-Arbuthnott of Balnamoon estate. Irvine was based as a painter at Arbroath, before he moved to Montrose where he gathered commissions from the rectors of the Montrose Academy and the curator of Montrose Museum.

Eventually he received much more work as he was recognised as Scotland's leading portraitist. He was a good friend of his fellow artist George Paul Chalmers. Among his portraits were those of James Coull (1786–1880), a survivor of the sea battle that led to the Capture of USS Chesapeake. Coull had also been born in Ferryden, near Montrose but decades before Irvine in 1786. Coull had fought at the Battle of Trafalgar and had lost a hand to a musket ball. After years of whaling he had retired to his hometown where Irvine painted him five times. Coull had become a celebrity because of his life and for living so long. Coull's obituary was eventually covered in the New York Times.

Irvine also painted some landscapes and he had begun memorial portraits of the Earl and Countess of Dalhousie when he died of congestion of the lungs at his home in Montrose on the 17 March 1889. Irvine has over thirty paintings in public ownership
