= Alstroemeria bicentenaria =

Scientific classification
- Kingdom: Plantae
- Clade: Tracheophytes
- Clade: Angiosperms
- Clade: Monocots
- Order: Liliales
- Family: Alstroemeriaceae
- Genus: Alstroemeria
- Species: A. bicentenaria

Binomial name
- Alstroemeria bicentenaria Soliz, A.Fuentes & Baya

Species of flowering plant

Alstroemeria bicentenaria is a species of flowering plant in the family Alstroemeriaceae. It is native to Bolivia, and was described in 2025.

== Taxonomy ==
The species was described by Cinthia Andrea Soliz Orellana, Alfredo Fernando Fuentes, and Ana Fabiola Baya Veliz in 2025.

== Distribution ==
Alstroemeria bicentenaria is native to the seasonally dry tropical biome of Bolivia.

== Description ==
Alstroemeria bicentenaria has underground tubers.

== Etymology ==
The species was named to celebrate the Bicentennial of Bolivia.
