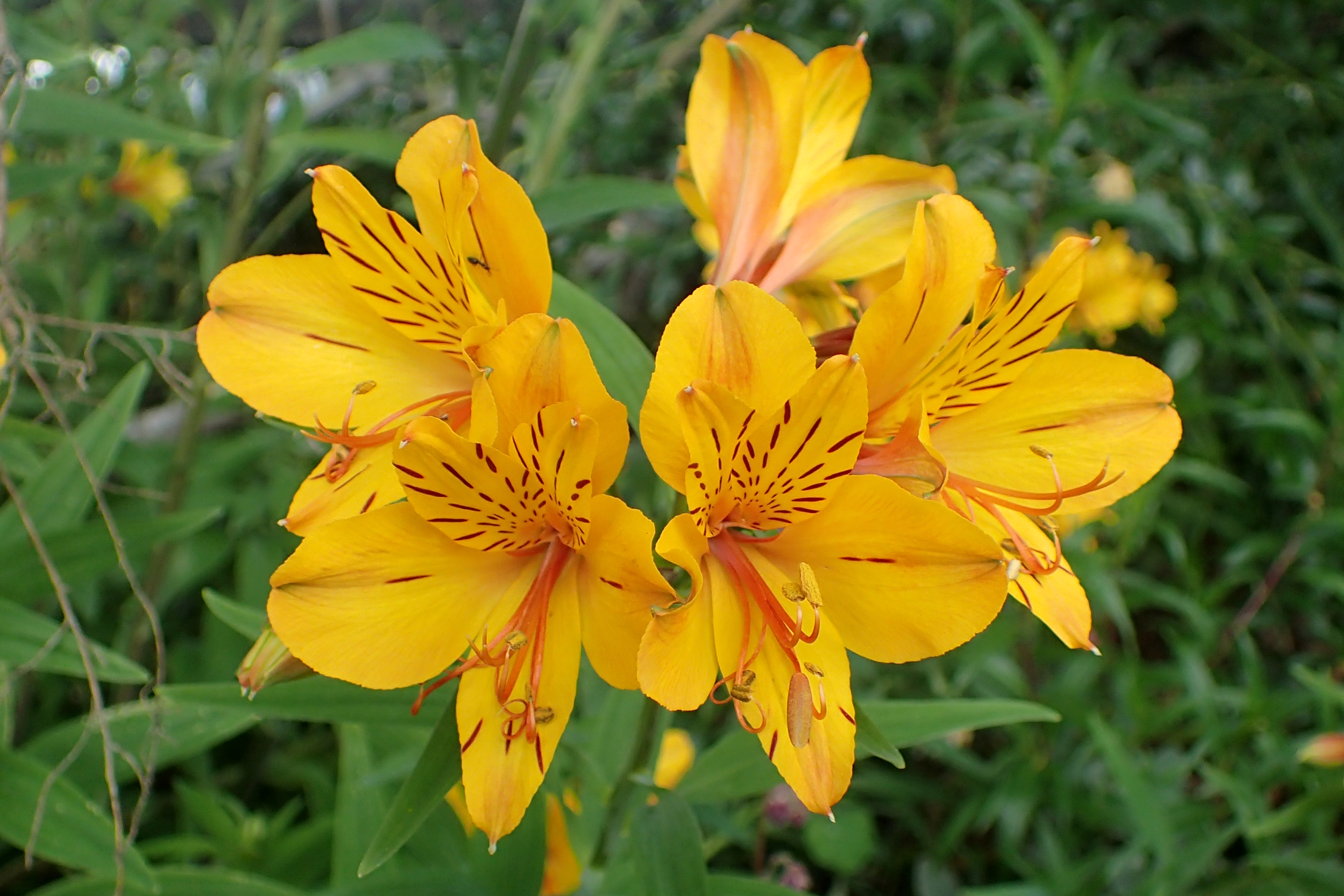

Scientific classification
- Kingdom: Plantae
- Clade: Embryophytes
- Clade: Tracheophytes
- Clade: Spermatophytes
- Clade: Angiosperms
- Clade: Monocots
- Order: Liliales
- Family: Alstroemeriaceae
- Genus: Alstroemeria
- Species: A. aurea

Binomial name
- Alstroemeria aurea Graham
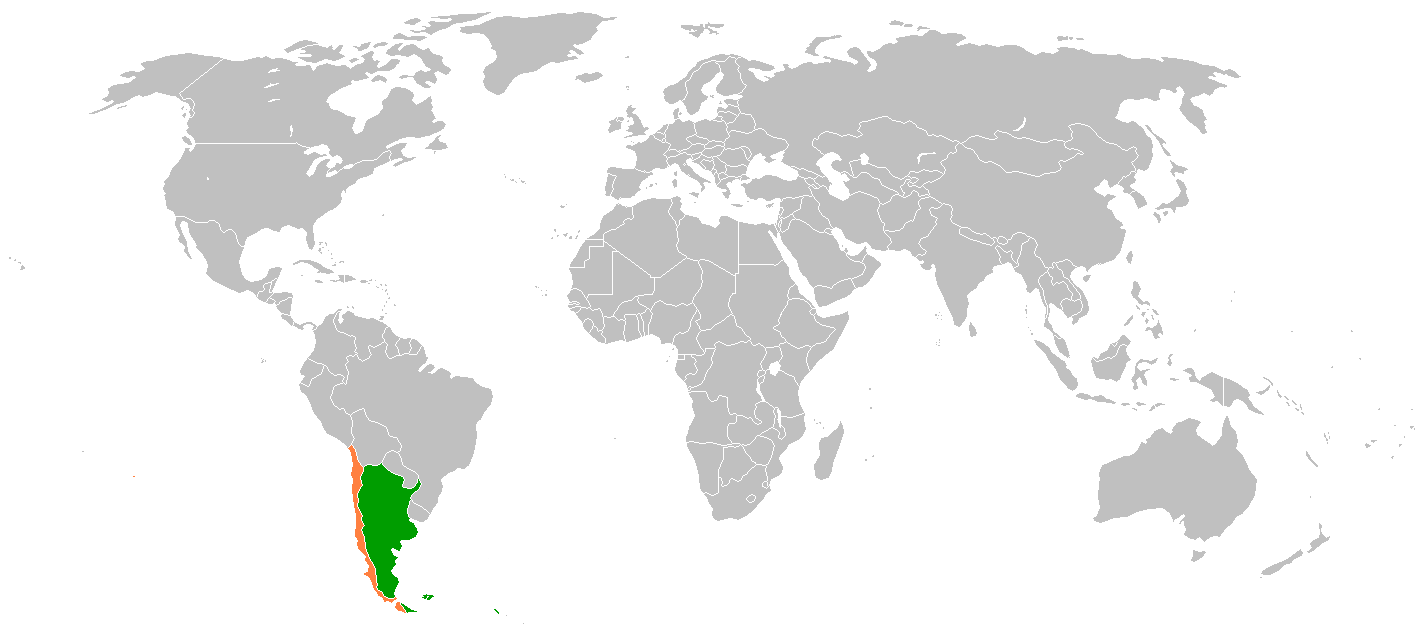
- Alstroemeria aurea is native to Chile and Argentina

Synonyms
- Alstroemeria araucana Phil.; Alstroemeria aurantiaca D.Don; Alstroemeria chiloensis Phil.; Alstroemeria concolor Steud.; Alstroemeria mutabilis Kunze ex Kunth; Alstroemeria nivali Meyen; Alstroemeria peruviana Van Houtte; Alstroemeria pulchella E.Vilm.; Alstroemeria xanthina Phil.

= Alstroemeria aurea =

Species of plant

Alstroemeria aurea is a species of flowering plant in the family Alstroemeriaceae, native to Chile and Argentina, but naturalised in Australia, New Zealand and the United Kingdom. It is also widely cultivated as an ornamental.

== Common names ==
Common names include yellow alstroemeria, though cultivars have been selected in a range of colours. The name Peruvian lily is often applied to this and other species of Alstroemeria, despite the fact that most are not native to that country.

== Description ==
Growing to 1 m (3.3 ft) tall by 0.5 m (1.6 ft) broad, it is a herbaceous perennial with brittle, fleshy roots beneath erect stems with narrow leaves. Many orchid-like flowers in brilliant shades of yellow and orange. appear in early to midsummer. The flowers may be heavily spotted or striped with red or brown. If undisturbed, plants will spread rapidly in benign conditions.

== Cultivation ==
When cultivated it is one of the hardiest alstroemerias, surviving temperatures of −10 °C (14 °F). It requires a sheltered spot in sun or part shade.

== Etymology ==
The Latin specific epithet aureum means "golden".

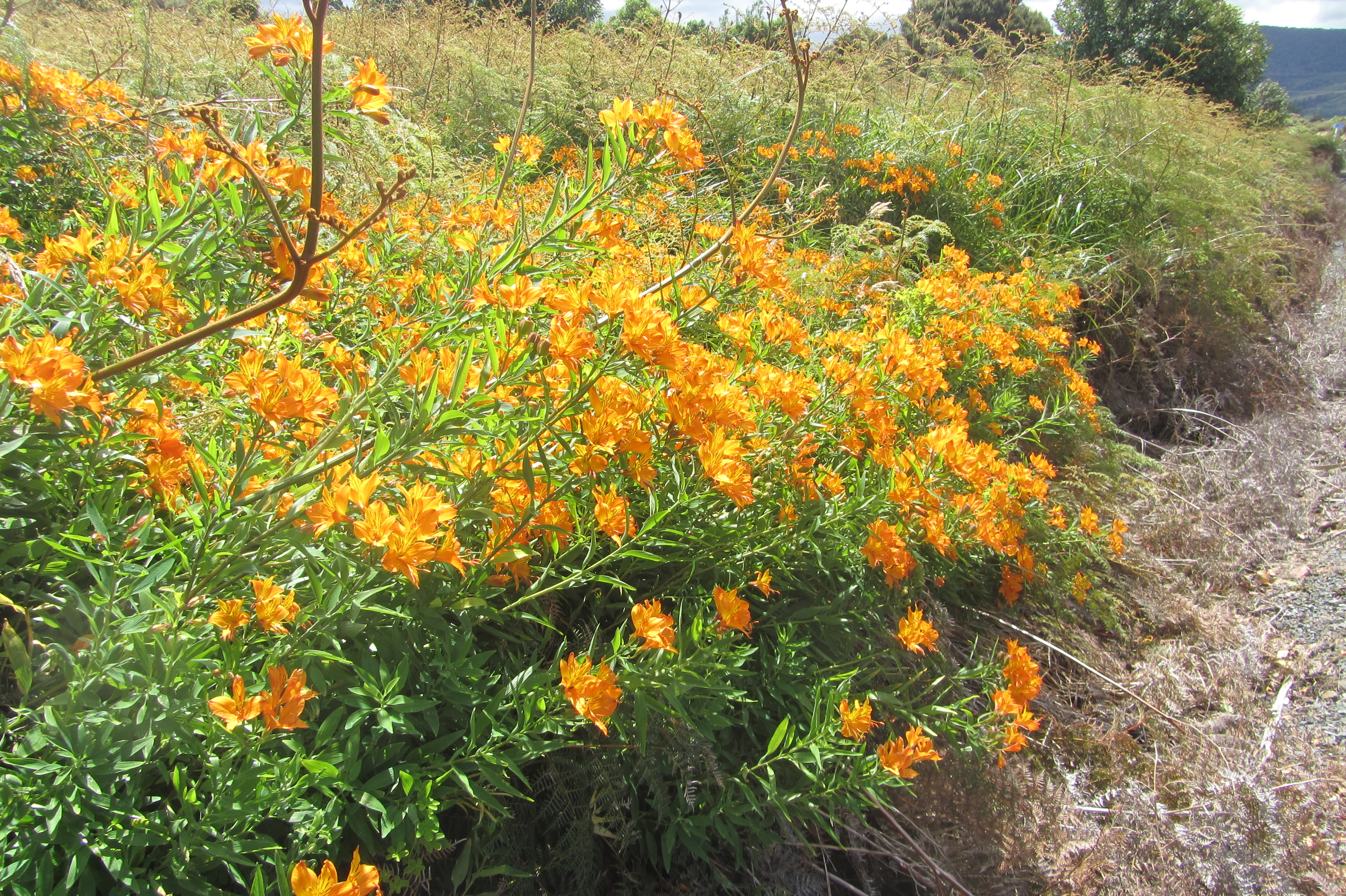

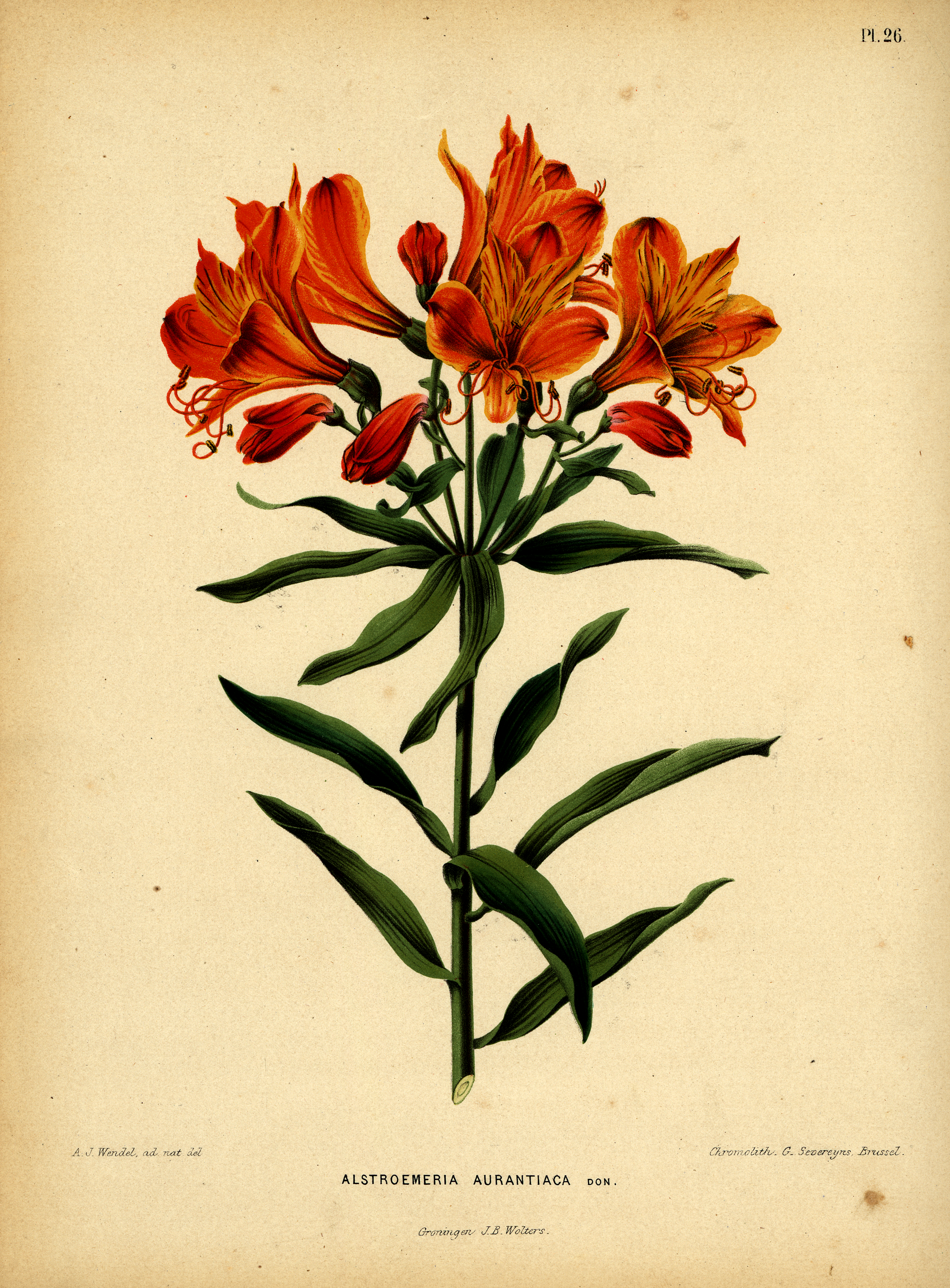

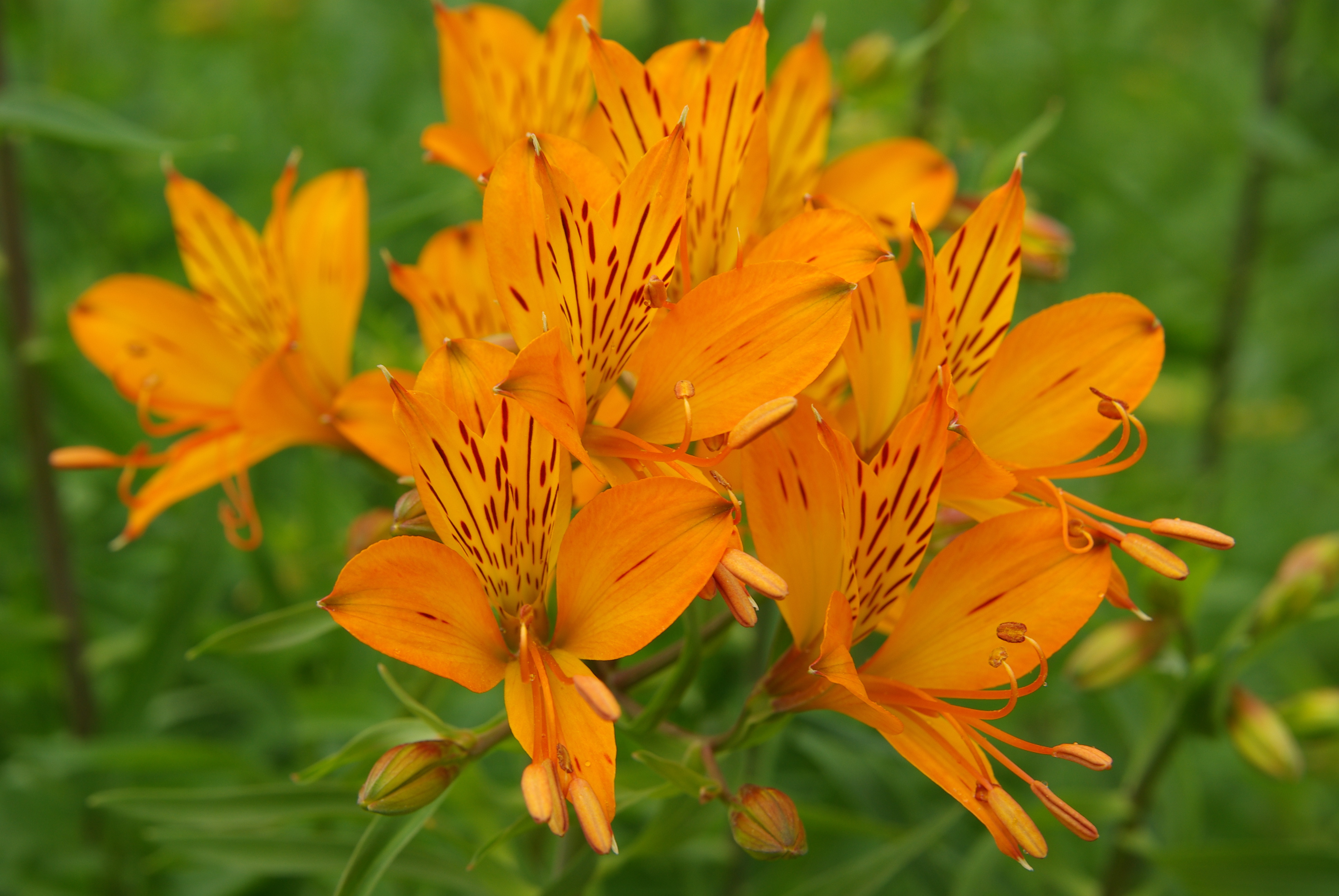
