= Robert Graham (botanist) =

Scottish physician and botanist (1786–1845)

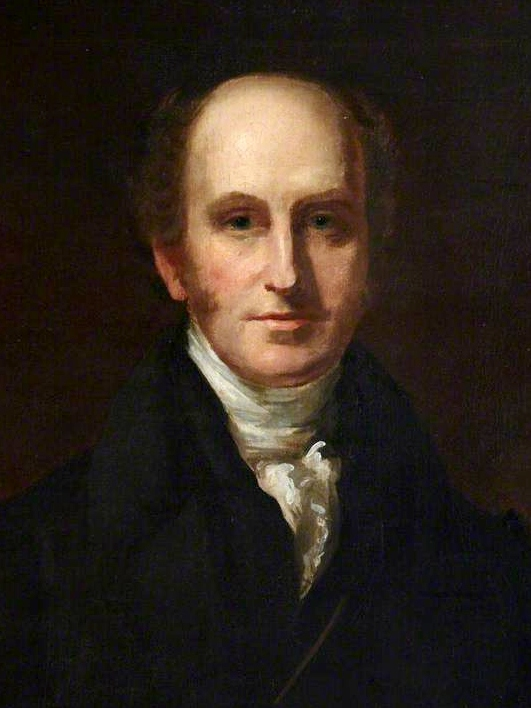
Robert Graham by Colvin Smith

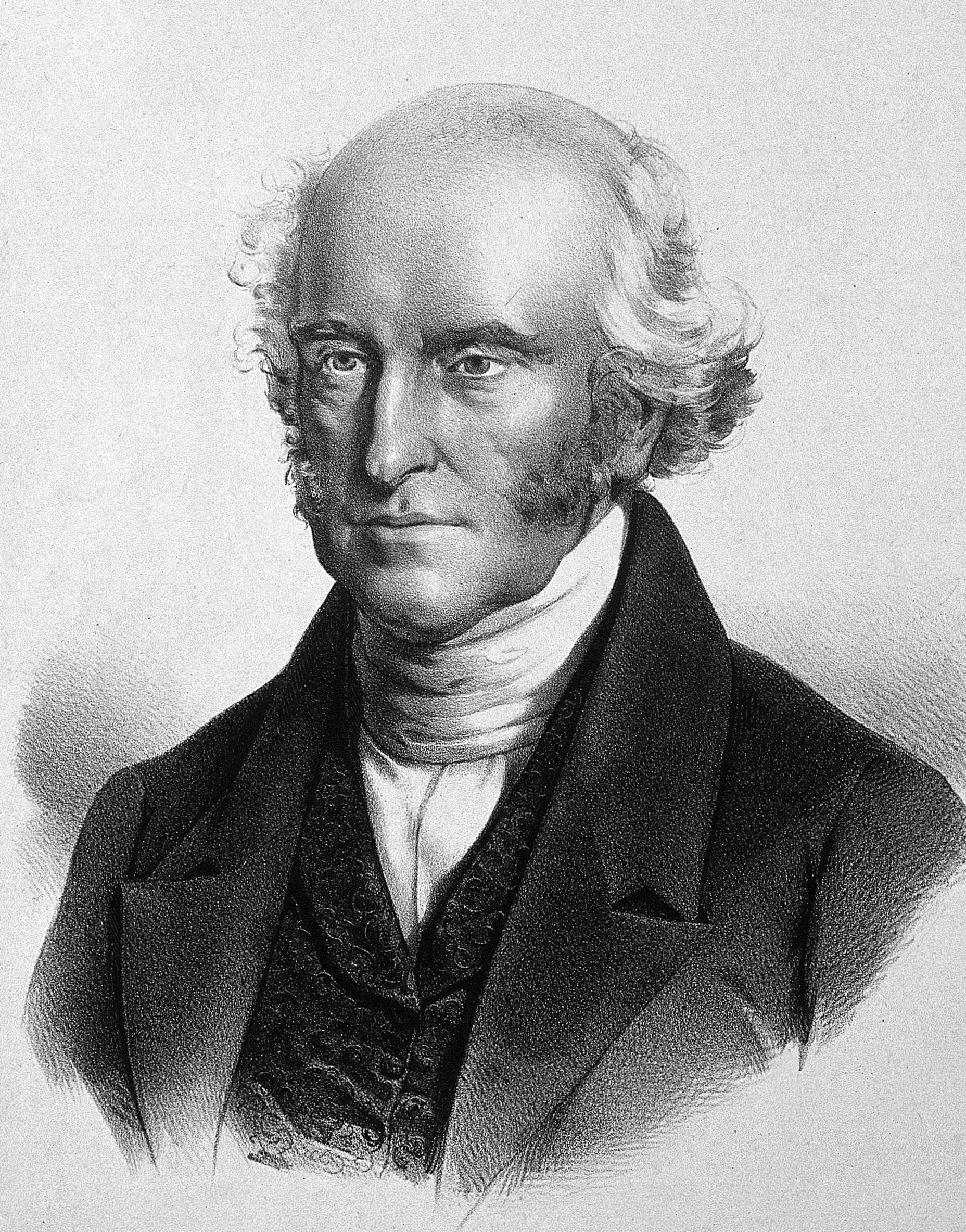
Robert Graham

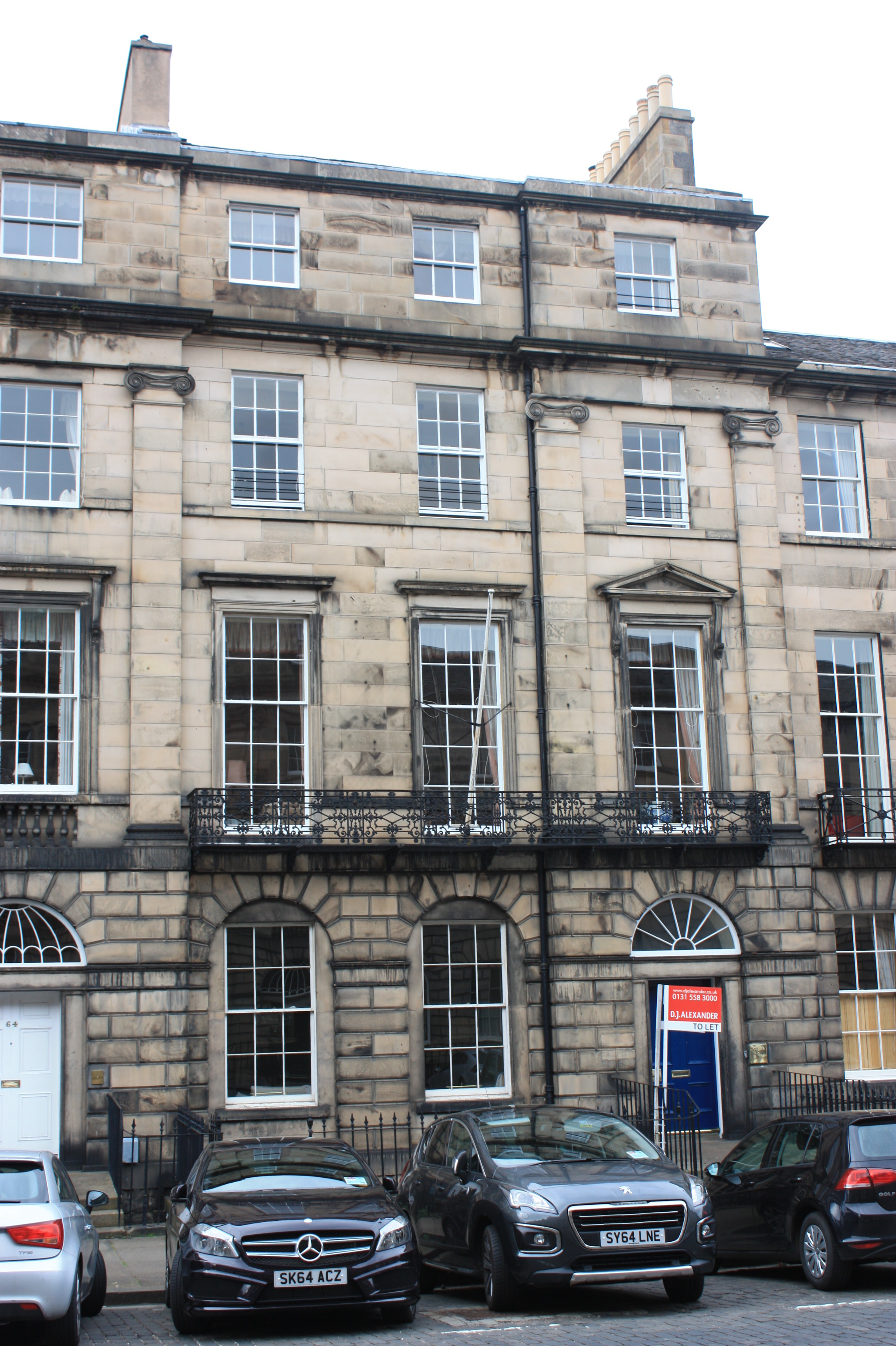
Robert Graham's house at 62 Great King Street, Edinburgh

Robert Graham FRSE FRCPE MWS (3 December 1786 – 7 August 1845) was a Scottish physician and botanist.

== Life ==
Graham was born in Stirling the son of Dr Robert Graham, physician. After studying at Stirling Grammar School he continued first to the University of Glasgow and then to the University of Edinburgh where he graduated around 1806, and completed his MD in 1808. He trained further at St Bartholomew's Hospital, London, where he qualified as a surgeon. He then returned to Scotland to practice at Glasgow Royal Infirmary 1812-3 and 1816–19.

In 1816 he began lecturing in botany at the University of Glasgow, taking over from Thomas Brown of Lanfine and Waterhaughs following his resignation. He was a major figure in the creation of Glasgow Botanic Gardens, and was the inaugural Chair of Botany at the Glasgow in 1818. In 1820 he moved to Edinburgh to take up the position of Professor of Botany and Medicine at the University of Edinburgh, a role he continued until 1845. He was also physician to the Royal Infirmary of Edinburgh, and the 6th Regius Keeper of the Royal Botanic Garden Edinburgh (1820–1845).

In 1820 he was elected a member of the Aesculapian Club. In 1821 Graham was elected a Fellow of the Royal Society of Edinburgh, his proposer being Thomas Charles Hope. In 1821 Graham was also elected a member of the Harveian Society of Edinburgh and served as President in 1825.

In the 1830s he is listed as living at 62 Great King Street in Edinburgh's New Town.

From 1840 to 1842 he served as President of the Royal College of Physicians of Edinburgh.

He died at Coldoch in Perthshire on 7 August 1845.

== Memberships and positions held ==
- Member of the Highland Society, 1821–45
- Fellow of the Royal Society of Edinburgh, 1821–1845
- President of the Royal College of Physicians, Edinburgh, 1840–42
- First President of the Botanical Society of Edinburgh, 1836
- President of the Medico-Chirugical Society, 1842

== Botanical contributions ==
He wrote descriptions of new and rare plants cultivated in the gardens which were published in Edinburgh New Philosophical Magazine, Curtis's Botanical Magazine and Hooker's Companion to the Botanical Magazine.

Among plants he described was the Australian shrub Lasiopetalum macrophyllum.

== In fiction ==
Robert Graham features as a character in Sara Sheridan's novel The Fair Botanists (2021).
