= Colvin Smith =

Scottish portraitist (1795–1875)

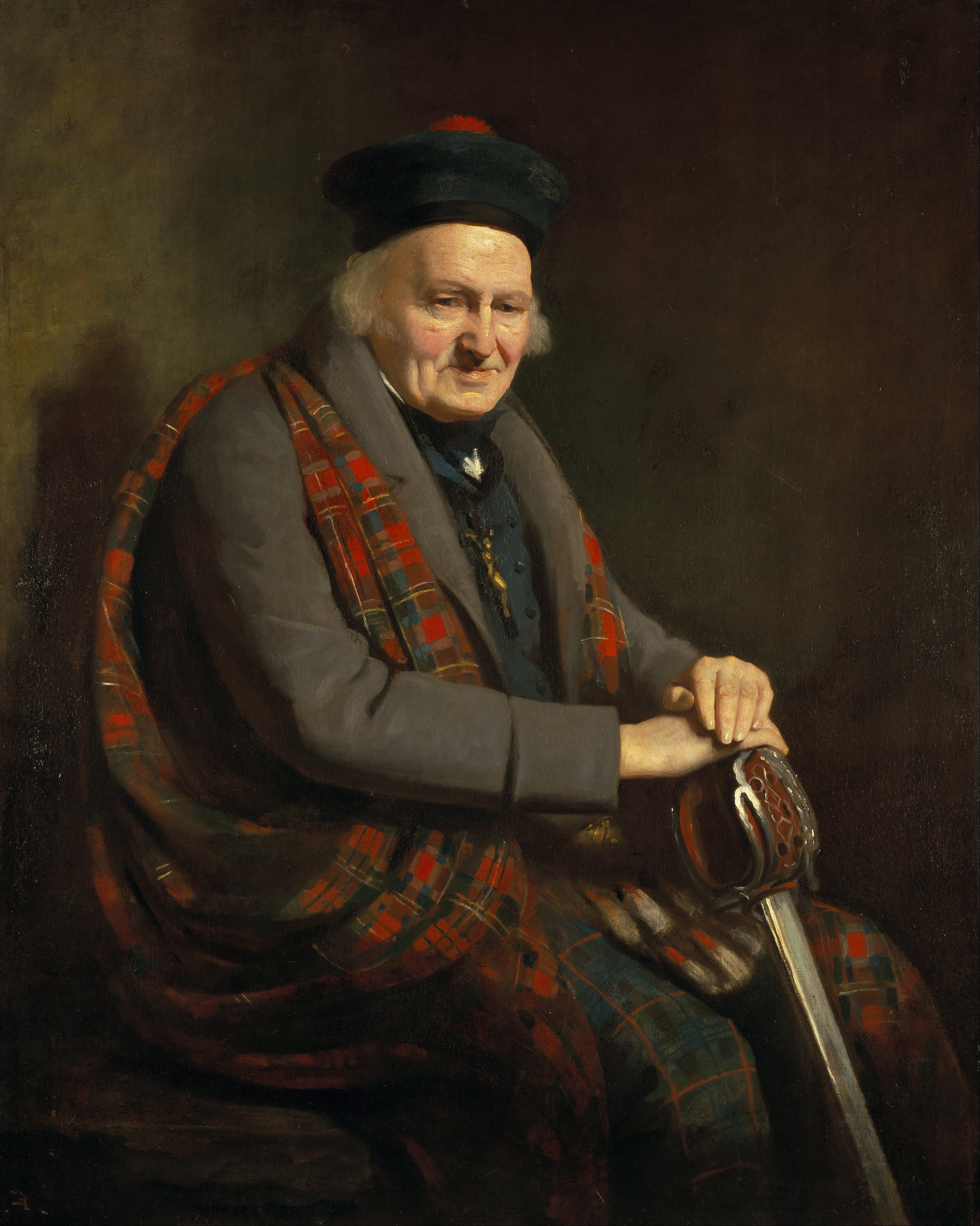
Patrick Grant, 1713 - 1824, 1822, National Gallery of Scotland.

Colvin Smith RSA (1795 – 21 July 1875) was a Scottish portraitist.

== Life ==
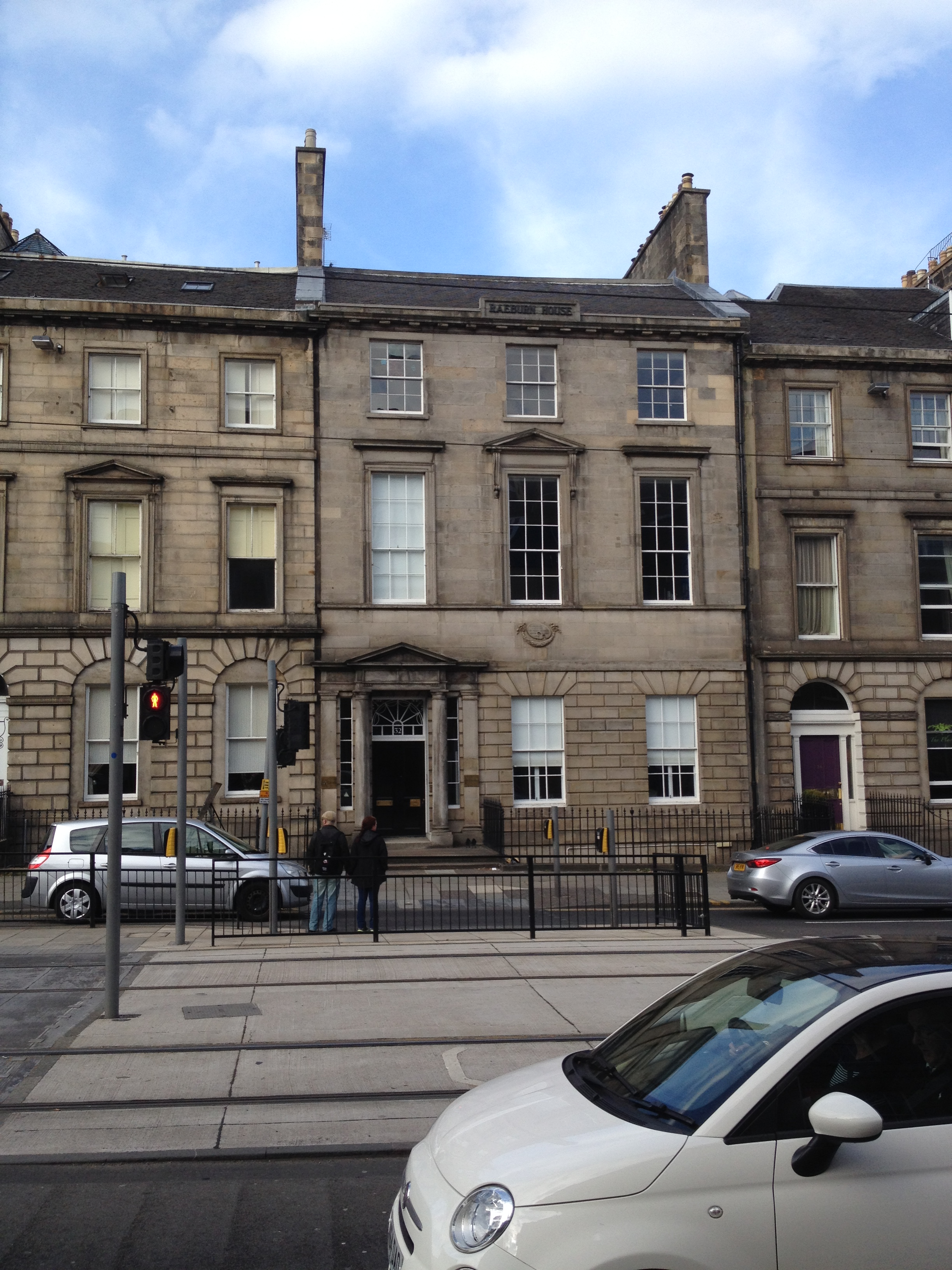
32 York Place, Edinburgh

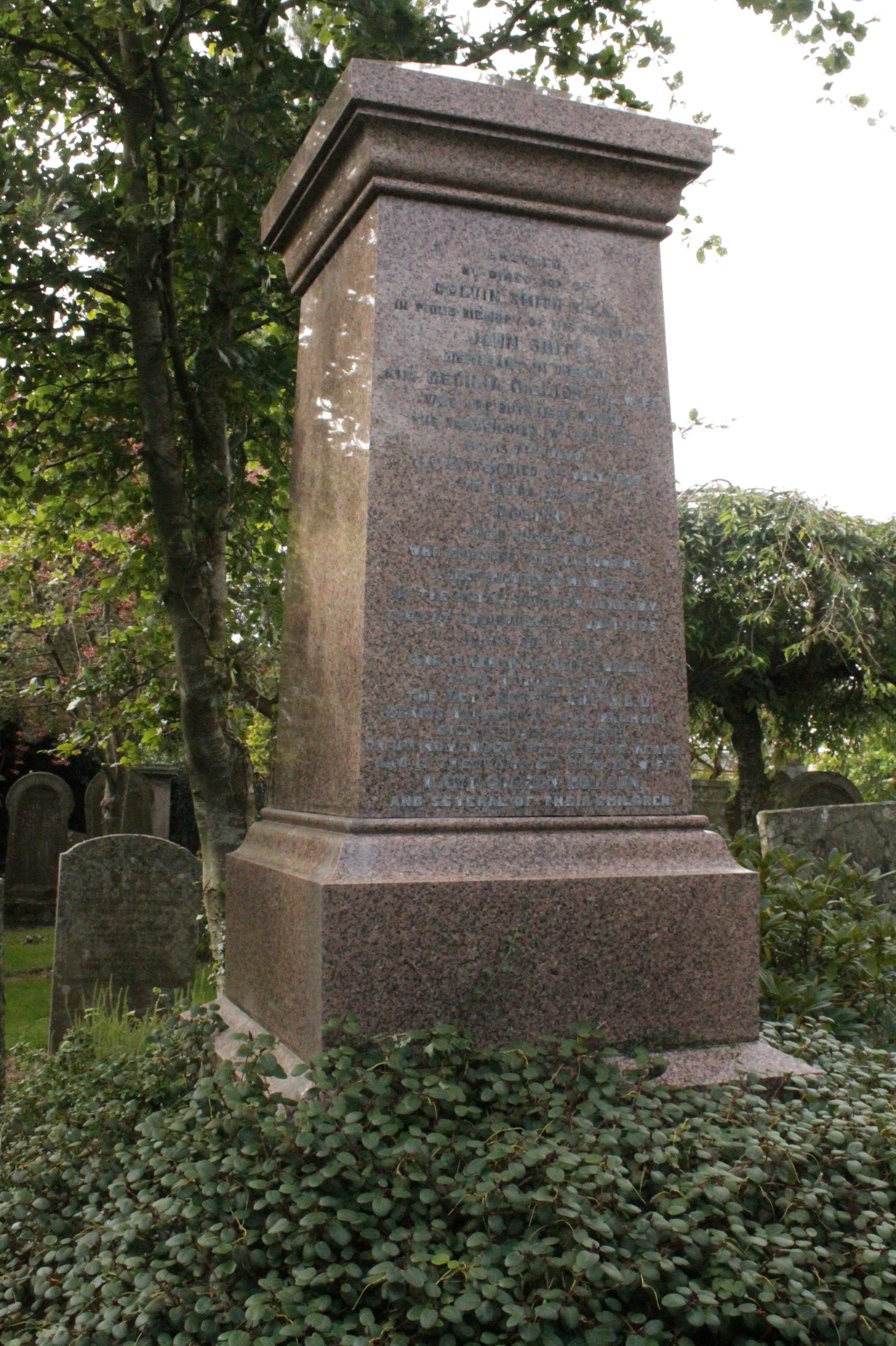
The grave of Colvin Smith, Brechin Cathedral

Smith was born at Brechin, in Angus, the son of John Smith, a merchant, and his wife, Cecilia Gillies. He studied art in London at the Royal Academy Schools and worked in Joseph Nollekens's studio. He then proceeded to work in Italy, where he executed some fine copies after Titian; and at Antwerp he made studies after the works of Rubens.

Returning to Scotland in 1827, he settled in Edinburgh, occupying the house and studio which had formerly belonged to the Scottish painter Raeburn at 32 York Place. Soon he attained a wide practice as a portrait-painter, and among his sitters were Lord Jeffrey, Henry Mackenzie, author of The Man of Feeling, and many of the most celebrated Scotsmen of the time.

In 1840 he was living at 32 York Place, Edinburgh. The property was purpose-built as an artist's studio by its predecessor, Sir Henry Raeburn

His portrait of Sir Walter Scott was so popular that he executed some twenty replicas of it, for seven of which he received fresh sittings. His works are distinguished by excellent draftsmanship, by directness and simplicity of treatment, and by well-marked individuality. His portrait of Thomas Brown of Lanfine and Waterhaughs hangs in the Court Office of the University of Glasgow.

He died in Edinburgh on 21 July 1875. He is buried with his parents in the churchyard of Brechin Cathedral. The grave lies south of the round tower.

== Influence ==
Smith's students included James Irvine, who went on to be one of Scotland's best portrait painters.
