= Gayana Botánica =

- Discipline: Botany
- Language: English, Spanish
- Edited by: Fulgencio Lisón Gil

Publication details
- History: 1966–present
- Publisher: University of Concepción (Chile)
- Frequency: Biannually
- Open access: Yes
- License: CC-BY-NC 4.0
- Impact factor: 0.439 (2021)

Standard abbreviations
- ISO 4: Gayana Bot.

Indexing
- ISSN: 0016-5301 (print); 0717-6643 (web)
- LCCN: 92655661
- OCLC no.: 909882555

Links
- Journal homepage; Online access; Online archive

Gayana Botánica is a biannual peer-reviewed scientific journal published by the University of Concepción. It covers "works on systematics, taxonomy, flora, ecology, physiology, morphology, development, conservation, cytogeny, and phytochemistry" and is the official journal of the Botanical Society of Chile.

== Abstracting and indexing ==
The journal is abstracted and indexed in Biological Abstracts, BIOSIS Previews, CAB Abstracts, Science Citation Index Expanded, and Scopus. According to the Journal Citation Reports, the journal has a 2021 impact factor of 0.439.
