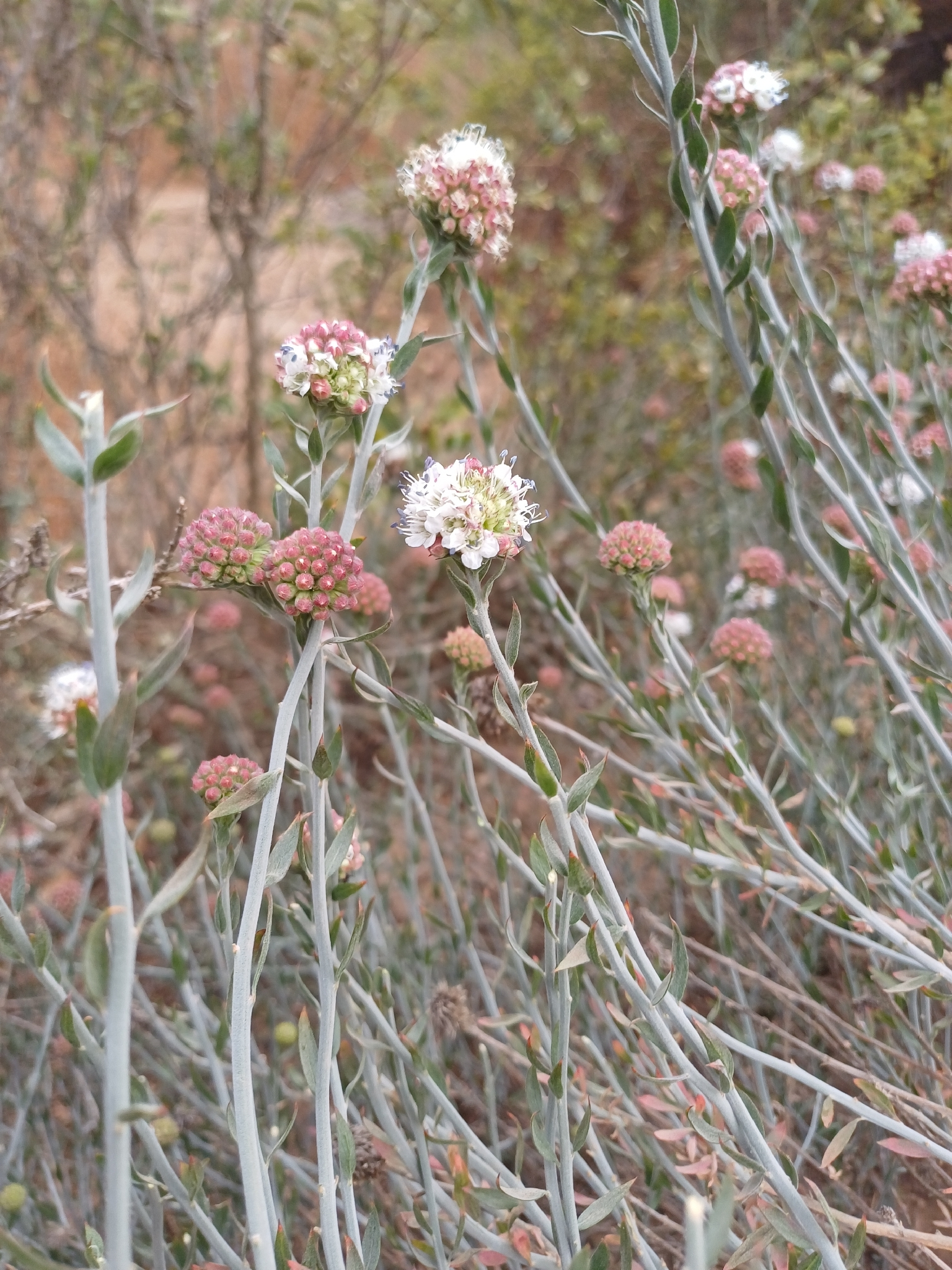
- In Elqui Province, Chile

Scientific classification
- Kingdom: Plantae
- Clade: Tracheophytes
- Clade: Angiosperms
- Clade: Eudicots
- Clade: Rosids
- Order: Malpighiales
- Family: Passifloraceae
- Genus: Malesherbia
- Species: M. fasciculata

Binomial name
- Malesherbia fasciculata D.Don

Synonyms
- Gynopleura fasciculata M.Roem.

= Malesherbia fasciculata =

Species of flowering plant

Malesherbia fasciculata is a species of flowering plant in the family Passifloraceae. It is a subshrub endemic to Northern and Central Chile. It is one of the 13 species in the genus Malesherbia that is endemic to Chile.

== Description ==
=== Morphology ===
M. fasciculata is described as ashy, with many stems originating from the same root covered in very short hairs. M. fasciculata grows up to 1–2 feet tall and has "leathery" leaves.

==== Reproduction ====
The flowers of M. fasciculata are white with red sepals, dark purple anthers, and are globular in shape. Flowers bloom in November.

=== Molecular biology ===
M. fasciculata was one of the species selected for the 1000 Plant Transcriptome project.

== Taxonomy ==
=== Historical classification ===
M. fasciculata was originally described in 1881/1882 by David Don. Similar to other species in the genera, Max J. Roem would attempt and fail to reclassify the species as Gynopleura in 1846.

=== Varieties ===
There are two varieties of M. fasciculata; var. fasciculata and var. glandulosa.

M. fasciculata var. fasciculata (D.don) is found in Coquimbo, Valparaíso, Metropolitana and Del General Libertador Bernardo O'Higgins in a variety of biomes.

M. fasciculata var. glandulosa (Ricardi) is much more localized, having only been identified at the Hurtado river's basin within the Coquimbo region.

The varieties differ from each other by the number of flowers formed on each stem, var. fasciculata will have 3-7 flowers whereas var. glandulosa has a single flower per stem. Additionally, var. glandulosa has matted hairs and glandular hairs on the leaves and apex of sepals.
