= Malesherbia tubulosa =

Mullaca
- Figure from Flora Peruviana et Chilensis: Ruiz & Pavón's Expedition (1777-1816). Its creator is unknown.

Conservation status
- Endangered (IUCN 3.1)

Scientific classification
- Kingdom: Plantae
- Clade: Tracheophytes
- Clade: Angiosperms
- Clade: Eudicots
- Clade: Rosids
- Order: Malpighiales
- Family: Passifloraceae
- Genus: Malesherbia
- Species: M. tubulosa

Binomial name
- Malesherbia tubulosa (Cav.) J.St.-Hil.

Synonyms
- Gynopleura tubulosa Cav.; Malesherbia thyrsiflora Ruiz & Pav.; Malesherbia cylindrostachya Urb. & Gilg

Species of flowering plant

Malesherbia tubulosa is subshrub native to central Peru. It is colloquially called Mullaca and Verónica. M. tubulosa can reach heights of 2 meters and has actinomorphic orange flowers.

Compared to other species of Malesherbia, M. tubulosa has relatively high genetic diversity. It is a host for immature Dione (Agraulis) dodona.

M. tubulosa is currently classified as endangered due to degradation of natural habitat due to urban expansion.
