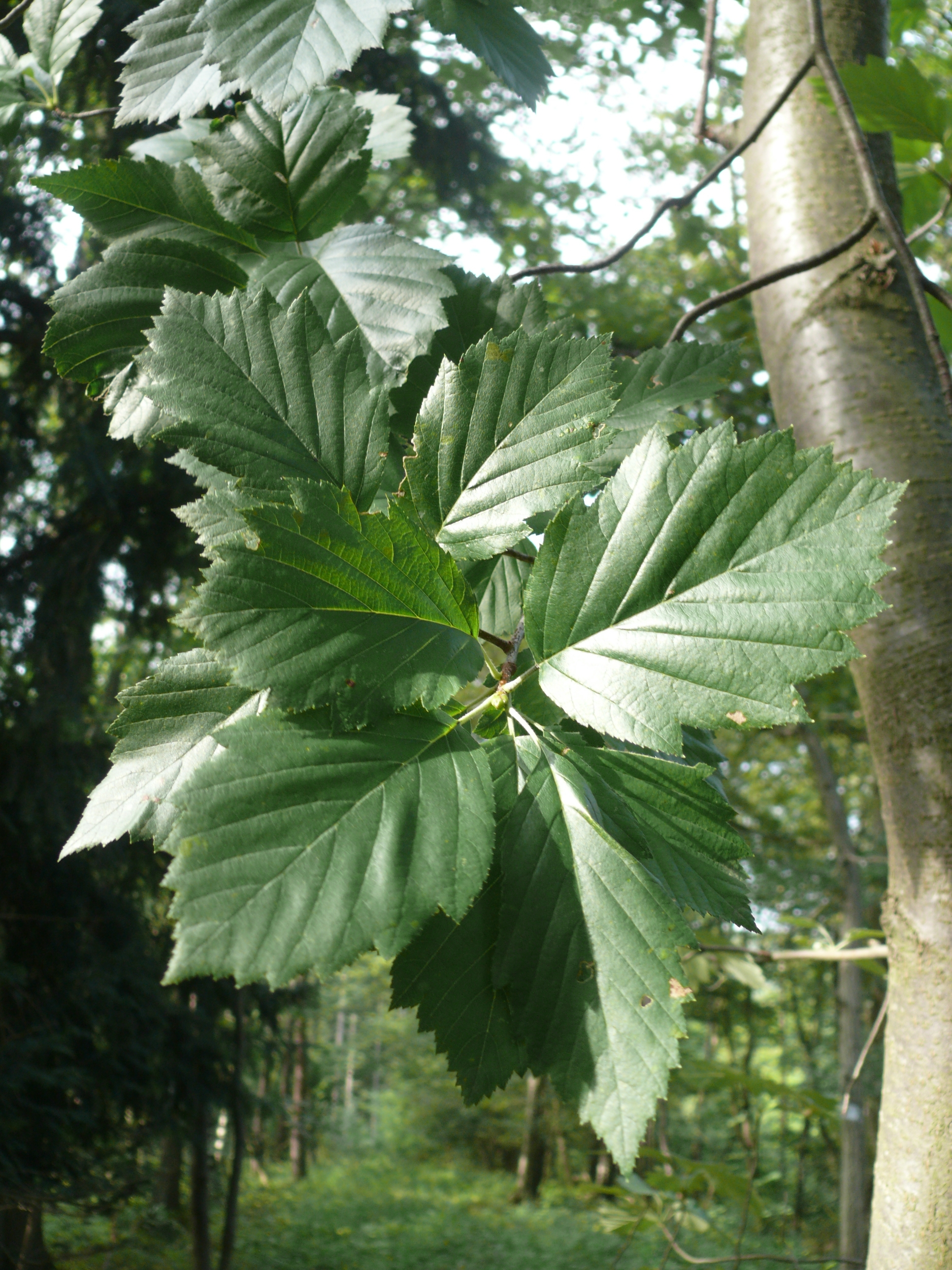

Scientific classification
- Kingdom: Plantae
- Clade: Embryophytes
- Clade: Tracheophytes
- Clade: Angiosperms
- Clade: Eudicots
- Clade: Rosids
- Order: Rosales
- Family: Rosaceae
- Genus: Aria
- Species: A. decipiens

Binomial name
- Aria decipiens (Bechst.) M.Roem.

Synonyms
- Synonymy: Aria cochleariformis (Meierott) Mosyakin, Fedor. & McNeill; Aria rotundifolia M.Roem.; Azarolus hybrida Borkh.; Crataegus hybrida Bechst.; Crataegus rotundifolia Bluff & Fingerh.; Hahnia aria var. rotundifolia (M.Roem.) Dippel; Karpatiosorbus cochleariformis (Meierott) Sennikov & Kurtto; Karpatiosorbus hybrida (Borkh.) Sennikov & Kurtto; Pyrus cochleariformis (Meierott) M.F.Fay & Christenh.; Pyrus decipiens Bechst.; Pyrus latifolia f. parumlobata Irmisch; Pyrus rotundifolia Bechst.; Sorbus acutiloba (Ilse) Hedl.; Sorbus acutiloba (Irmisch) G.Kirchn.; Sorbus acutisecta Reuther & O.Schwarz; Sorbus ariatorminalis Gremli; Sorbus cochleariformis Meierott; Sorbus confusa Gremli; Sorbus confusa var. ovalifolia Rouy & E.G.Camus; Sorbus confusa var. rotundifolia (M.Roem.) Rouy & E.G.Camus; Sorbus decipiens (Bechst.) G.Kirchn.; Sorbus hardeggensis Kovanda; Sorbus heilingensis Düll; Sorbus isenacensis Reuther; Sorbus latifolia f. acutiloba Irmisch; Sorbus latifolia var. parumlobata (Irmisch) C.K.Schneid.; Sorbus multicrenata Bornm. ex Dull; Sorbus parumlobata (Irmisch) G.Kirchn.; Sorbus rotundifolia (M.Roem.) Hedl.; Sorbus sarcocarpa Gand.; Sorbus subcordata Bornm. ex Dull

= Aria decipiens =

Species of plant

Aria decipiens, syn. Karpatiosorbus hybrida, is a species of plant in the family Rosaceae. It is the result of hybridisation between common whitebeam (Aria edulis) and wild service tree (Torminalis glaberrima), and is native to western and central Europe.
