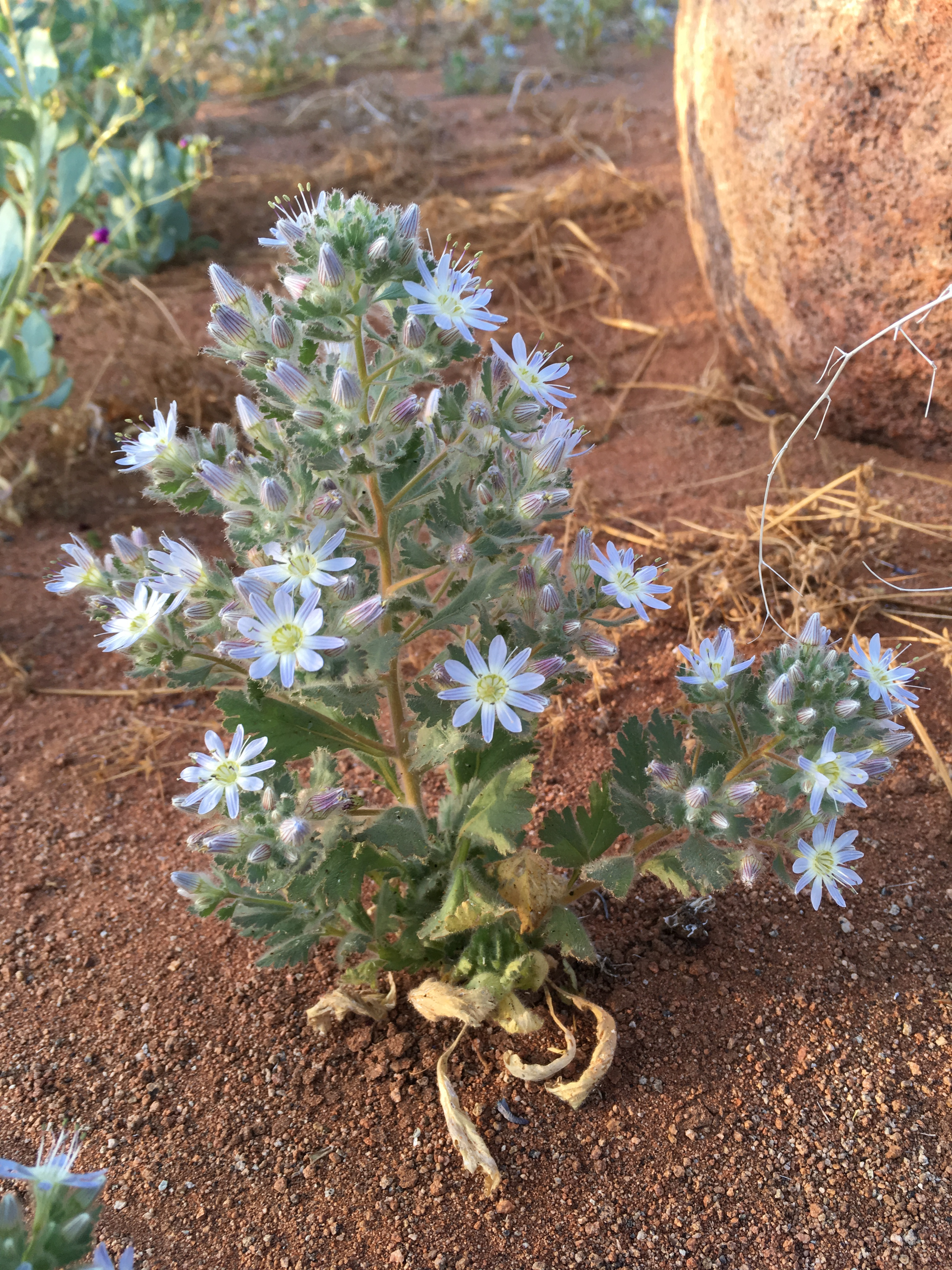

Scientific classification
- Kingdom: Plantae
- Clade: Tracheophytes
- Clade: Angiosperms
- Clade: Eudicots
- Clade: Rosids
- Order: Malpighiales
- Family: Passifloraceae
- Genus: Malesherbia
- Species: M. humilis

Binomial name
- Malesherbia humilis Poepp.

= Malesherbia humilis =

Species of flowering plant

Malesherbia humilis is an annual herb that grows in the subtropics of northern and central Chile to Argentina.

== Taxonomy ==
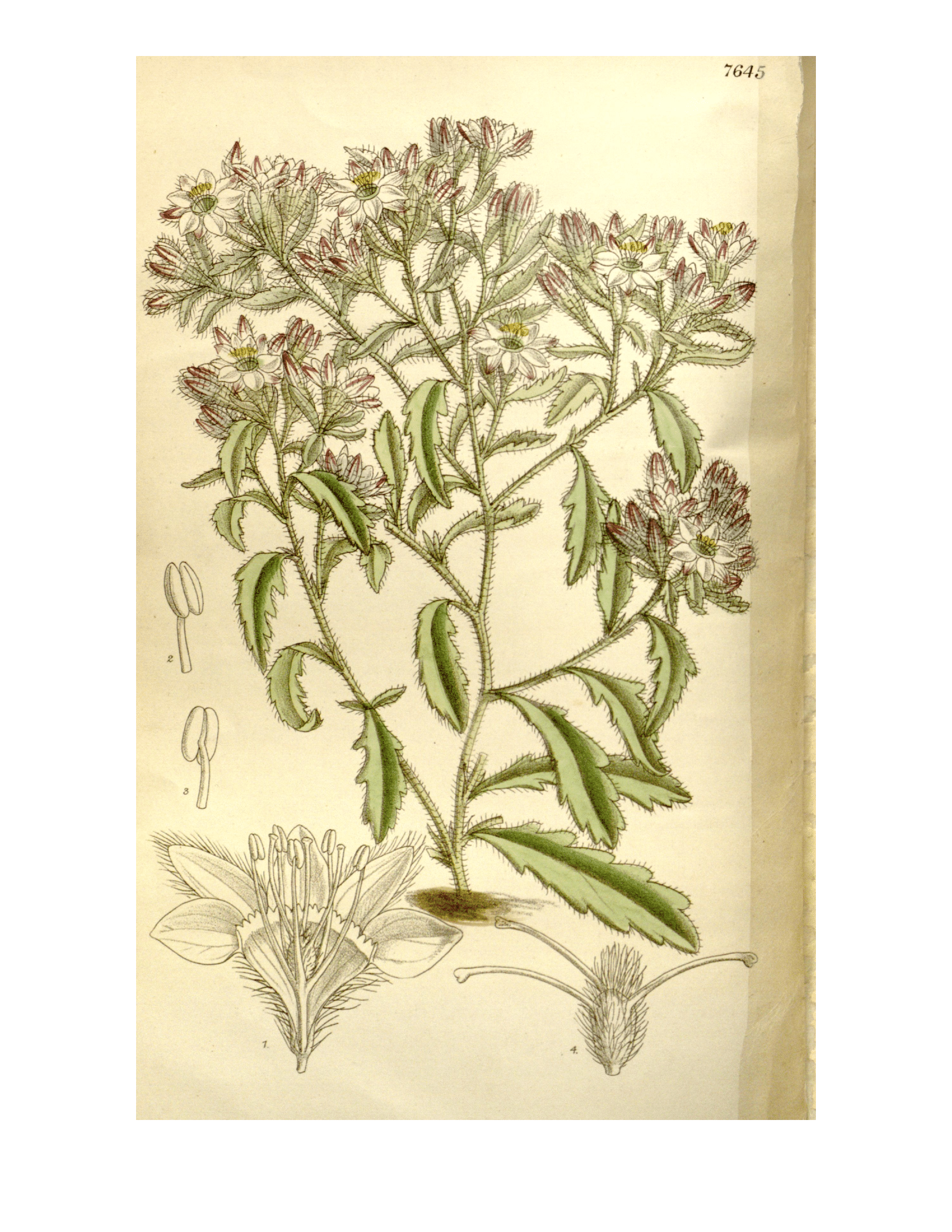
Botanical drawing of Malesherbia humilis. Found in Curtis's botanical magazine vol 125 - Tab. 7645 (1899)

=== Historical classification ===
While M. humilis was originally classified as Malesherbia in 1829 by Poeppig stating that the species was "shaggy" with a low prostrate stem, lunceolate leaves, pedunculate pale blue flowers. Roemer would suggest its reclassification as Gynopleura in 1846, however the species has remained classified as Malesherbia.

Historically, M. humilis was a member of the Malesherbia humilis complex, composed of Malesherbia humilis, M. gabrielae, M. multiflora, and M. taltalina, however, Ricardi would reclassify each member as an individual species. Leaving only the M. humilis varieties as members of the complex.

=== Varieties ===
As of 2022, there are three accepted varieties of M. humilis, var. humilis, var. parviflora, var. proqinqua.

Variety humilis was previously classified as Gynopleura dilatata (Walp.). It has the largest range of the varieties, ranging from Northern Chile to Argentina.

Variety parviflora (Phil.) Ricardi differs from var. humilis by its smaller leaves and smaller flowers. It is found in coastal regions and river basins within the Tarapacá, Antofagasta, Atacama, and Coquimbo regions. It was originally classified as a species, M. parviflora, in 1893, but would reclassified as a variety in 1967.

Variety propinqua (Gay) Ricardi is only found in on the interior semidesert hills in the Coquimbo region. It differs from var. humilis in its larger leaves and larger flowers, which have larger floral cups, sepals, and petals. In 1847 the variety was considered a separate species, M. propinqua, but it would later be demoted to the status of variety in 1897. It is synonymous with var. gabrielae (Ricardi) Gengler.

==== Previously accepted varieties ====
var. gabrielae reclassified as var. propinqua. var. taltalina reclassified as var. parviflora

Variety identification key

1. Floral tube funnelform when pressed flat, flaring from the base of the ovary to the throat. Distribution:290S-33020'S ........................... 2

1. Floral tube wineglass-shaped when pressed flat, remaining narrow after flaring at the base of the ovary. Distribution: 290S-21..............4

2. Floral tube length generally less than 7mm. Leaf stipules linear and lacking lobes................................................ M. humilis var. humilis

2. Floral tube length greater than or equal to 7 mm. Leaf stipules often bifid or lobed, sometimes linear and/or unlobed.............................3

3. Androgynophore pilose over entire length ..........................................................................................................M. humilis var. gabrielae

3. Androgynophore glabrous, or pilose only at the base of the ovary .................................................................. M. humilis var. propinqua

4. Petals lacking an apical glandular hair .............................................................................................................. M. humilis var. parviflora

4. Petals with a single apical glandular hair ............................................................................................................. M. humilis var. taltalina

Please note - this identification key treats gabrielae and taltalina as accepted varieties.

== Distribution ==
M. humilis are found from Santiago to Guatacondo, Chile. Some specimens have been collected in the Neuquén province, Argentina. The species are typically found at altitudes under 1000m, but some specimens have been collected up to 2900m. They grow in rocky and arid soils.
