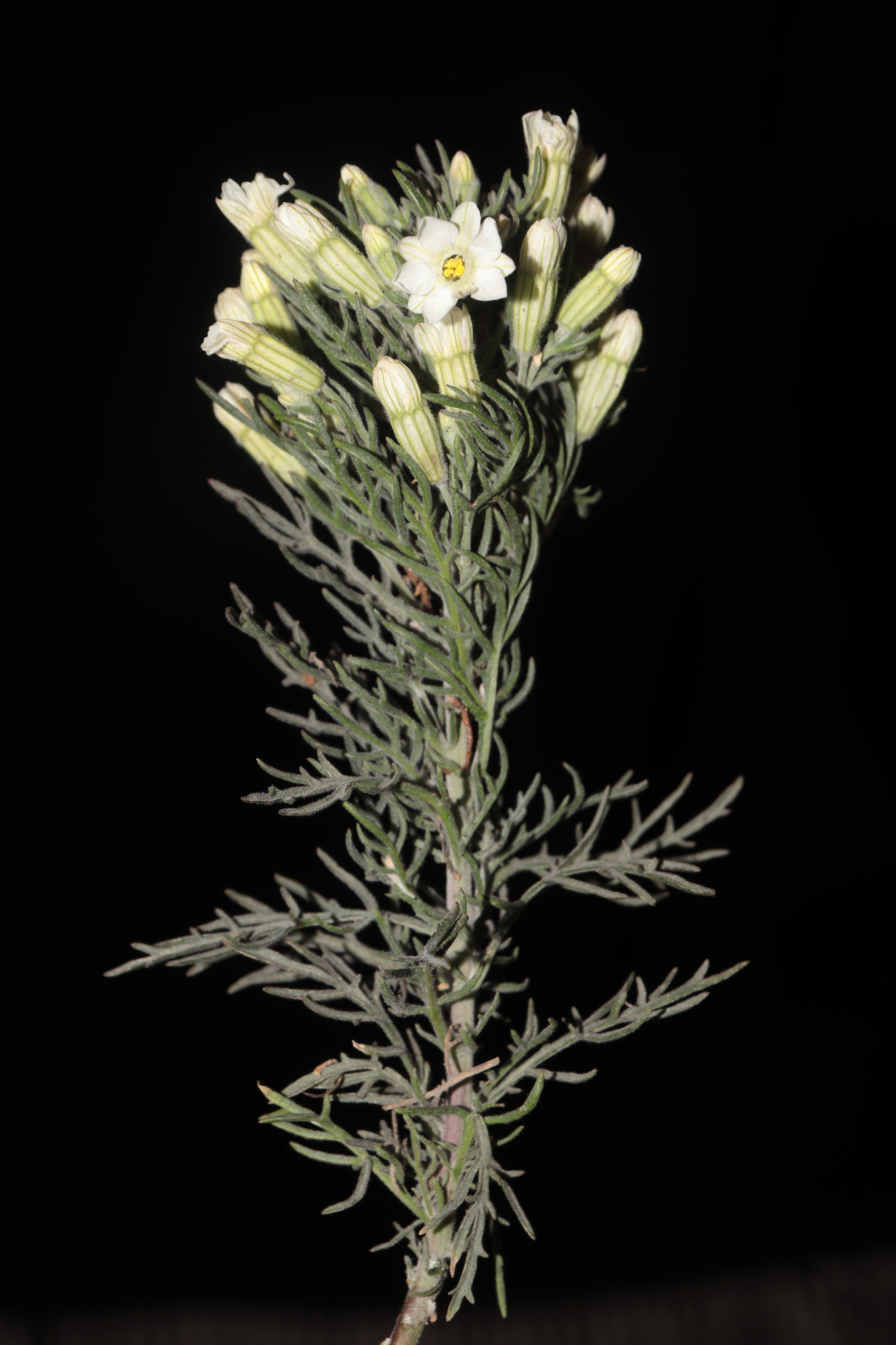

Conservation status
- Endangered (IUCN 3.1)

Scientific classification
- Kingdom: Plantae
- Clade: Tracheophytes
- Clade: Angiosperms
- Clade: Eudicots
- Clade: Rosids
- Order: Malpighiales
- Family: Passifloraceae
- Genus: Malesherbia
- Species: M. angustisecta

Binomial name
- Malesherbia angustisecta Harms
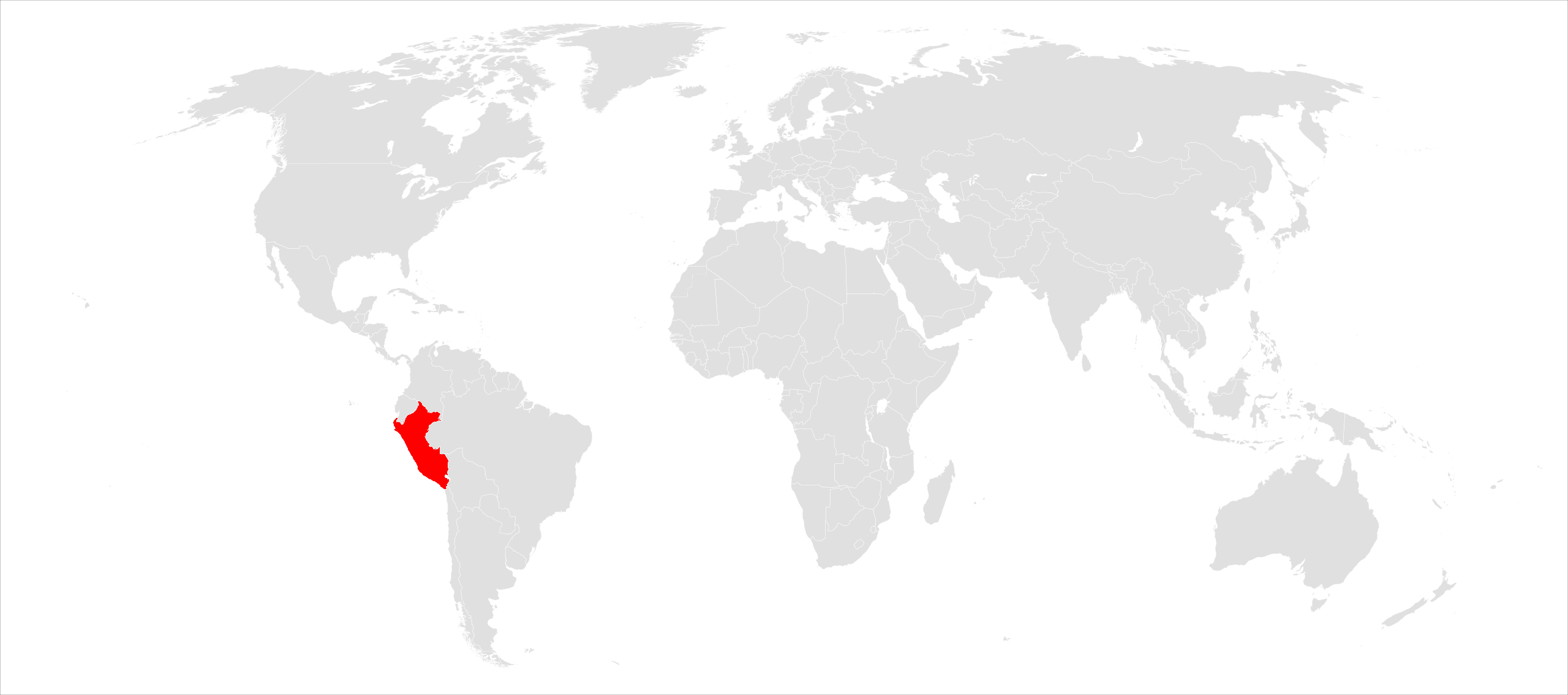
- Range of M. angustisecta as of 2023

= Malesherbia angustisecta =

Clavelina

Species of flowering plant

Malesherbia angustisecta is an endangered member of Malesherbia (Passifloraceae). It is colloquially called clavelina.

== Description ==
=== Morphology ===
M. angustisecta is a pale green woody shrub can grow up to 0.5 meters tall. Its branches are covered in soft silver hairs. Visually, it is very similar to M. tenuifolia, but can be identified by its broader calyx and higher crown.

==== Flower morphology ====
The sepals of M. angustisecta are "sparsely hairy" and nearly as long as the petals. Its petals are white or pink, ovate, and 7-8mm long.

== Taxonomy ==
The first published description of the species dates to 1922 and Hermann Harms is accredited with its discovery. The specimen from which this species was described, was collected in the Camanä Province above Caraveli. It was collected in 1915 at altitudes of 2350 m above sea levels in an area described as sparse of vegetation surrounded by other shrubs and cacti.

== Distribution ==
M. angustisecta is native to arid and semiarid deserts of Peru. It has been identified in the Arequipa and Caravelí Provinces, Province Mariscal Nieto, and Tarata and Candarave provinces. It can be found at altitudes of 1800-3035m.

== Conservation status ==
Malesherbia angustisecta is currently considered endangered due to its restricted distribution.
