= Malesherbia fatimae =

Scientific classification
- Kingdom: Plantae
- Clade: Tracheophytes
- Clade: Angiosperms
- Clade: Eudicots
- Clade: Rosids
- Order: Malpighiales
- Family: Passifloraceae
- Genus: Malesherbia
- Species: M. fatimae

Binomial name
- Malesherbia fatimae Weigend & H.Beltrán

Species of flowering plant

Malesherbia fatimae is a shrub native to Chuquibamba, Peru. It phenotypically differs greatly from other Peruvian members of Malesherbia in terms of leaves and branch formation and density. It flowers all year long and has dense racemes red flowers.

It is capable of producing hybrids with Malesherbia tenuifolia; this was the first interspecies cross identified in Malesherbia.
