= Malesherbia arequipensis =

Conservation status
- Vulnerable (IUCN 3.1)

Scientific classification
- Kingdom: Plantae
- Clade: Tracheophytes
- Clade: Angiosperms
- Clade: Eudicots
- Clade: Rosids
- Order: Malpighiales
- Family: Passifloraceae
- Genus: Malesherbia
- Species: M. arequipensis

Binomial name
- Malesherbia arequipensis Ricardi
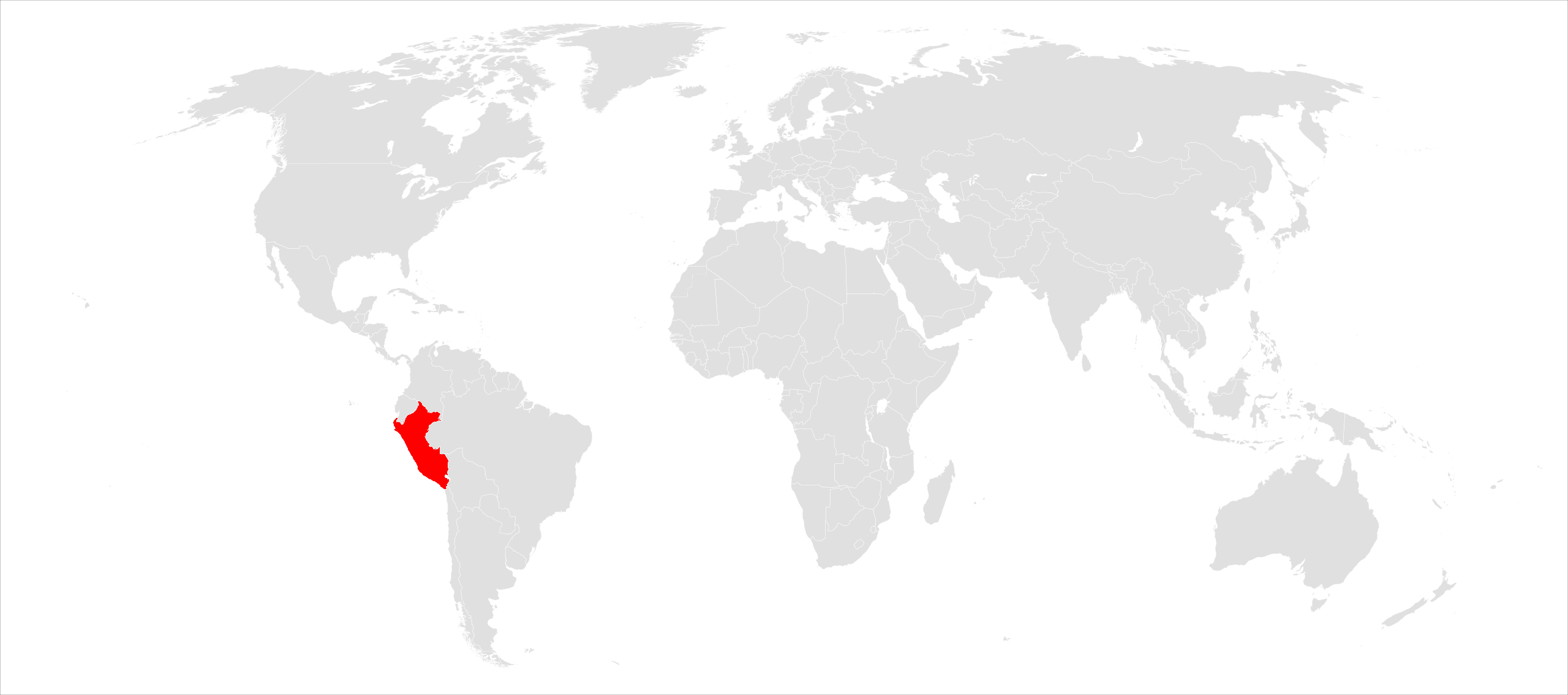
- Range of M. arequipensis as of 2023

Species of flowering plant

Malesherbia arequipensis is a herbaceous member of Malesherbia (Passifloraceae) with white flowers. It first described in 1961 by botanist Mario H. Ricardi Salinas and is native to Arequipa and Moquegua. It is the only member of Malesherbia that grows outside of the Andes. It grows up to 15 cm tall and has white flowers.

As of 2006, the species is considered vulnerable in Arequipa, but is not under protection.

Malesherbia arequipensis has been recorded hybridizing with M. ardens, the offspring show intermediate flower sizes, but have coloration similar to M. arequipensis; the offspring are likely sterile on the basis of malformed seeds.
