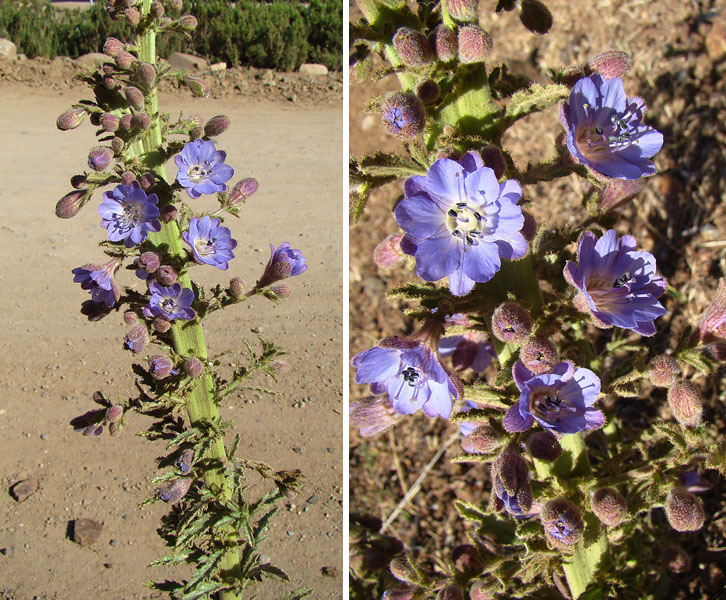

Scientific classification
- Kingdom: Plantae
- Clade: Tracheophytes
- Clade: Angiosperms
- Clade: Eudicots
- Clade: Rosids
- Order: Malpighiales
- Family: Passifloraceae
- Genus: Malesherbia
- Species: M. paniculata

Binomial name
- Malesherbia paniculata D.Don

Synonyms
- Gynopleura paniculata (D.Don) M.Roem.; Malesherbia linearifolia var. paniculata (D.Don) Reiche; Gynopleura coerulea C.Presl; Malesherbia coerulea (C.Presl) Steud.

= Malesherbia paniculata =

Blue Star of the Mountain Range

Species of flowering plant

Malesherbia paniculata is perennial subshrub native to the Atacama, Coquimbo, Valparaíso, Metropolitana, and O'Higgins regions of Chile. It can be found at elevations of up to 2600m to sea level. It was originally described in 1827 by D. Don.

Phenotypically, M. paniculata is extremely similar to sister species M. linearifolia. Though they are distinguishable by their leaves. Additionally, they differ in their species range.
