= Malesherbia splendens =

Moro

Conservation status
- Endangered (IUCN 3.1)

Scientific classification
- Kingdom: Plantae
- Clade: Tracheophytes
- Clade: Angiosperms
- Clade: Eudicots
- Clade: Rosids
- Order: Malpighiales
- Family: Passifloraceae
- Genus: Malesherbia
- Species: M. splendens

Binomial name
- Malesherbia splendens Ricardi

Species of flowering plant

Malesherbia splendens is a shrub in the genus Malesherbia. It is colloquially known as Moro, Fox Tail, and Veronica.

== Description ==
=== Morphology ===
Malesherbia splendes is a shrub with a woody trunk that can grow up to 1.5-2 meters high. It has densely leafy 50-95 cm long branches. The plant produces "numerous" immature seeds, these are fovelated with fine long ribs.

==== Flower morphology ====
Flowers are found in the axil of lesser leaves. They are tubular and yellow or pale green. Sepals are 9-10mm long, triangular, and end with a thick glandular hair. Stamen are exserted with 45-48mm long filaments and 3-.52mm long anthers. Pollen grains are 67-83x40-49mic. Styles are longer than stamen, approximately 50-52mm long with small obconical stigmas.

=== Genetics ===
It has low genetic diversity, potentially due to its small species range.

== Taxonomy ==
Malesherbia splendes was originally described in 1965 by Ricardi. The specimens from which this species was originally described were found in the Langa district, Santa Eulalia Valley, and between Asnapuqio and Buena vista. It is readily distinguished from other members of Malesherbia by its flowers.

== Distribution ==
Malesherbia splendes is native to the Lurín river basin of the Andean region of Peru. It is found at altitudes of 2100-3000m in arid and rocky slopes of the western slopes of the central Andes.

== Conservation status ==
Malesherbia splendes is currently classified as endangered due to low genetic diversity and diminishing species boundary due to the expansion of goat farming.
