= Stapfiella claoxyloides =

Conservation status
- Near Threatened (IUCN 3.1)

Scientific classification
- Kingdom: Plantae
- Clade: Tracheophytes
- Clade: Angiosperms
- Clade: Eudicots
- Clade: Rosids
- Order: Malpighiales
- Family: Passifloraceae
- Genus: Stapfiella
- Species: S. claoxyloides

Binomial name
- Stapfiella claoxyloides Gilg

Species of flowering plant

Stapfiella claoxyloides is a shrub native to Burundi, Rwana, Uganda, and the Democratic Republic of the Congo, Africa. It's found in wooded grasslands and rainforests at altitudes of 1200 - 2350 m.

It grows from 1.5-2.5 meter tall, has 1.5-3 cm long leaves, and white flowers. Medicinally, it's used as a treatment for earaches.

It is currently classified as near threatened.
