= Malesherbia turbinea =

Conservation status
- Endangered (IUCN 3.1)

Scientific classification
- Kingdom: Plantae
- Clade: Tracheophytes
- Clade: Angiosperms
- Clade: Eudicots
- Clade: Rosids
- Order: Malpighiales
- Family: Passifloraceae
- Genus: Malesherbia
- Species: M. turbinea

Binomial name
- Malesherbia turbinea J.F.Macbr.

Species of flowering plant

Malesherbia turbinea is a shrub native Candarave, Tacna, Peru. It has been recorded growing near Lake Huananhuata.

It can grow up to 1 meter tall, has "blood-red" flowers and white or yellow anthers. While phenotypically very similar to Malesherbia haemantham, it differs phenotypically in its flowers as they do not have black boarders or black anthers which are observed in M. haemantham.

It is classified as endangered due to its extremely small range.
