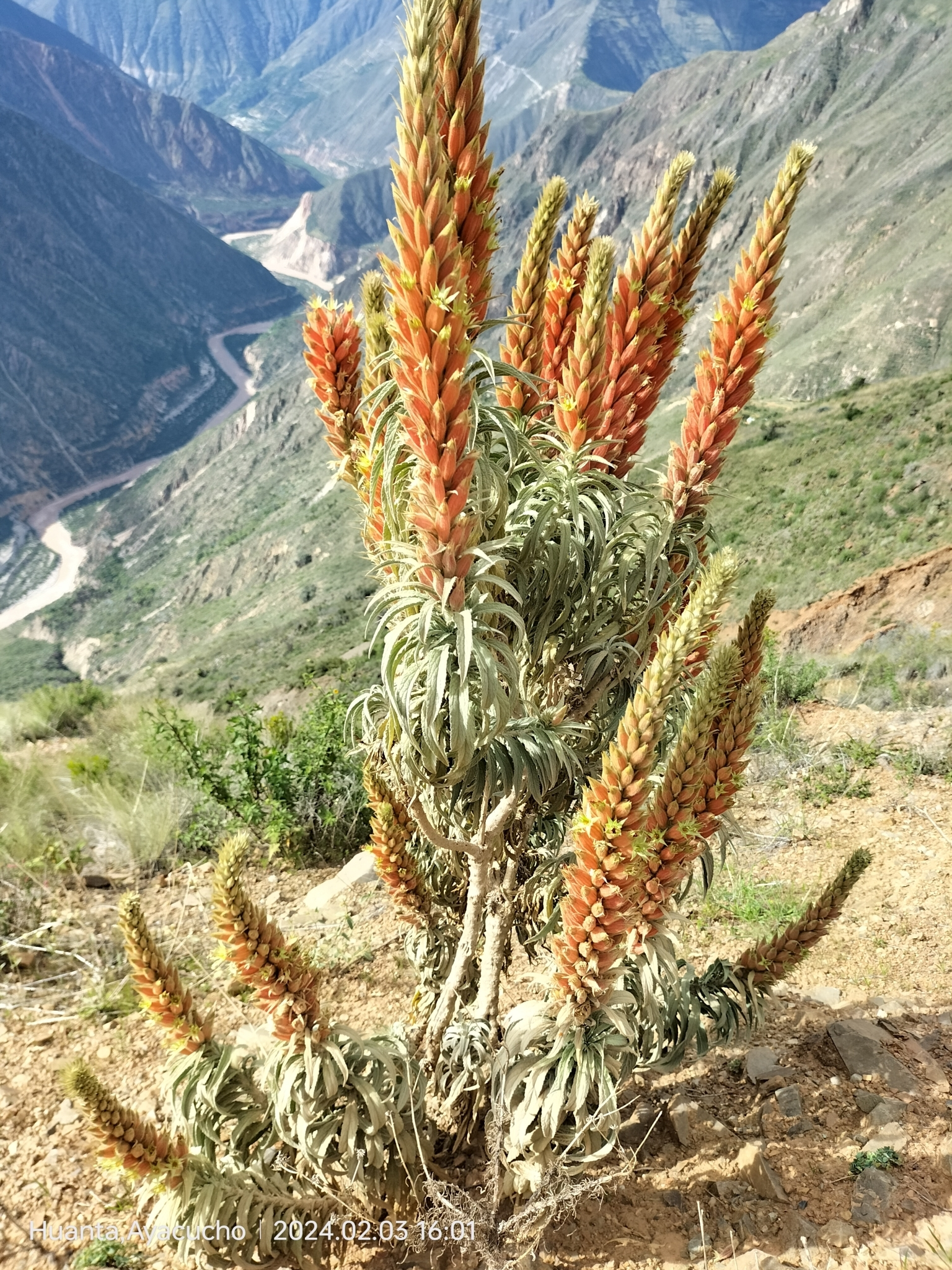

Scientific classification
- Kingdom: Plantae
- Clade: Tracheophytes
- Clade: Angiosperms
- Clade: Eudicots
- Clade: Rosids
- Order: Malpighiales
- Family: Passifloraceae
- Genus: Malesherbia
- Species: M. weberbaueri

Binomial name
- Malesherbia weberbaueri Gilg

Synonyms
- Malesherbia galjufii J.F.Macbr.; Malesherbia weberbaueri var. galjufii (J.F.Macbr.) Ricardi

= Malesherbia weberbaueri =

Qonchinya

Species of flowering plant

Malesherbia weberbaueri is species of flowering plant in the family Passifloraceae. It is a subshrub native to Apurímac, Ayacucho, Huancavelica and Junín. It is found at altitudes of 2300–3600 meters.

Malesherbia weberbaueri has yellow-green flowers in racemes. Previously, M. weberbaueri had two varieties, var. weberbaueri and var. galjufii. These varieties differed in locality. Neither variety is currently accepted.

As of 2007, M. werebaueri is classified as vulnerable.
