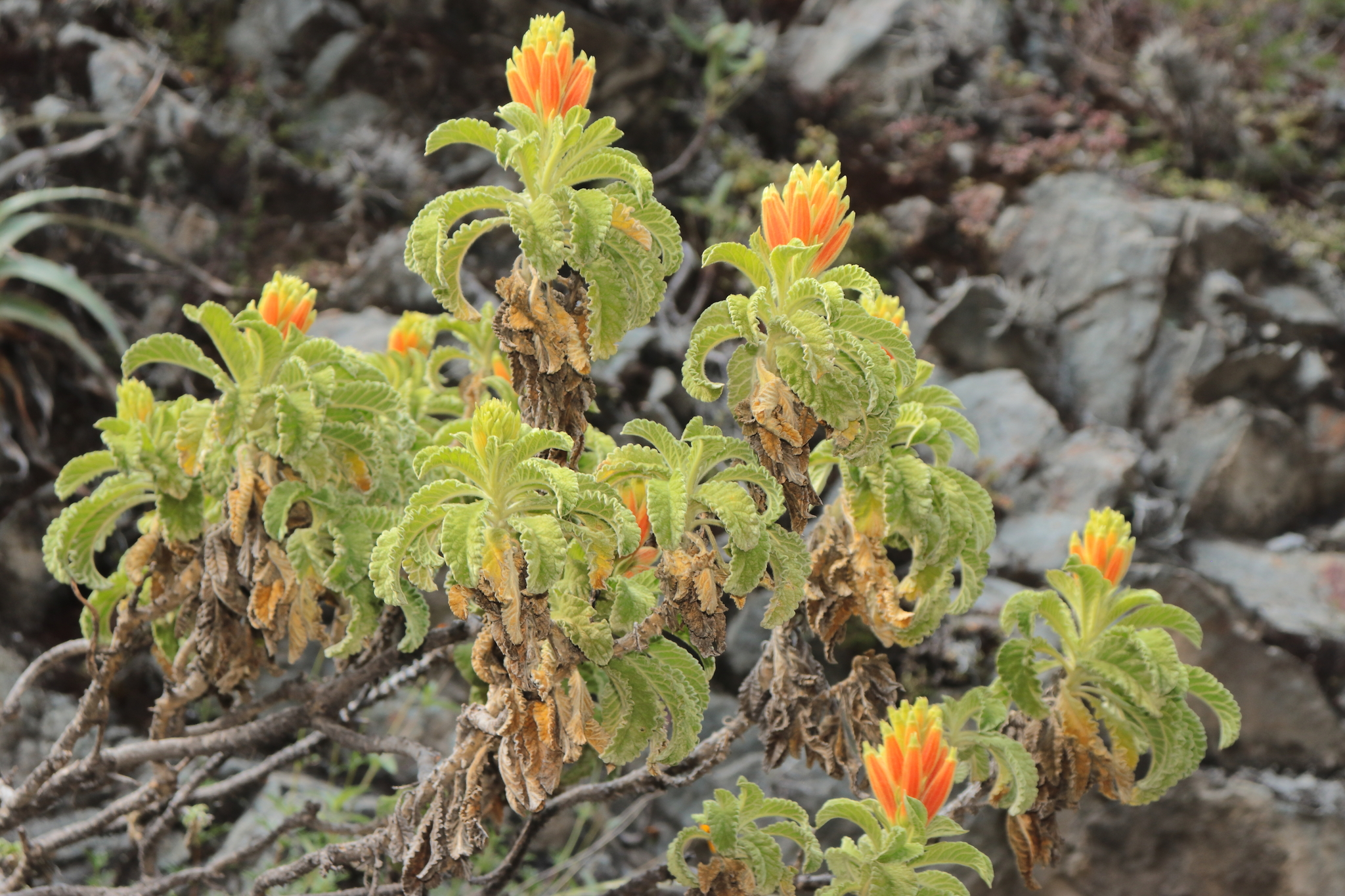

Conservation status
- Endangered (IUCN 3.1)

Scientific classification
- Kingdom: Plantae
- Clade: Tracheophytes
- Clade: Angiosperms
- Clade: Eudicots
- Clade: Rosids
- Order: Malpighiales
- Family: Passifloraceae
- Genus: Malesherbia
- Species: M. scarlatiflora

Binomial name
- Malesherbia scarlatiflora Gilg

= Malesherbia scarlatiflora =

Species of flowering plant

Malesherbia scarlatiflora is a shrub native to the pacific slopes of Peru. It grows up to 1 meter tall, has narrow ovate-acuminate leaves, and orange flowers.

The genetic diversity of the species is average, based on heterozygosity rates across two populations. There is strong evidence of geneflow between different populations. On the basis of low genetic diversity, M. scarlatiflora is currently classified as endangered.
