= Stapfiella lucida =

Nzingati

Conservation status
- Endangered (IUCN 3.1)

Scientific classification
- Kingdom: Plantae
- Clade: Tracheophytes
- Clade: Angiosperms
- Clade: Eudicots
- Clade: Rosids
- Order: Malpighiales
- Family: Passifloraceae
- Genus: Stapfiella
- Species: S. lucida

Binomial name
- Stapfiella lucida Robyns

Species of flowering plant

Stapfiella lucida is a shrub native to Burundi, Congo, Rwana, and Zaïre. It reaches heights of 1.5 – 3 meters high, shiny 4–5 cm leaves that cluster at the top of branches, yellowish white homostylous flowers, and chestnut colored seeds.

== Varieties ==
There are currently two accepted varieties of S. lucida, var. lucida and var. pubescens (Verdc.).

Variety pubescens is restricted to the wet tropics of Burundi. It differs from var. lucida as it has less acuminate capsule and more densely pubescent capsule. Prior to the discovery of var. pubescens, S. lucida had not been documented in Burundi. Var. pubescens is endangered.
