= Stapfiella muricata =

Scientific classification
- Kingdom: Plantae
- Clade: Embryophytes
- Clade: Tracheophytes
- Clade: Spermatophytes
- Clade: Angiosperms
- Clade: Eudicots
- Clade: Rosids
- Order: Malpighiales
- Family: Passifloraceae
- Genus: Stapfiella
- Species: S. muricata

Binomial name
- Stapfiella muricata Staner

Species of flowering plant

Stapfiella muricata is a shrub native to Zaïre, Africa. It grows in the undergrowth of rainforests, at altitudes of 900 m.

S. muricata can grow up to 1 meter tall and has white flowers. It differs from other members of Stapfiella phenotypically by its 5 - 9mm panicles, glabrous branches and large acuminate leaves.
