= Malesherbia haemantha =

Conservation status
- Endangered (IUCN 3.1)

Scientific classification
- Kingdom: Plantae
- Clade: Tracheophytes
- Clade: Angiosperms
- Clade: Eudicots
- Clade: Rosids
- Order: Malpighiales
- Family: Passifloraceae
- Genus: Malesherbia
- Species: M. haemantha

Binomial name
- Malesherbia haemantha Harms
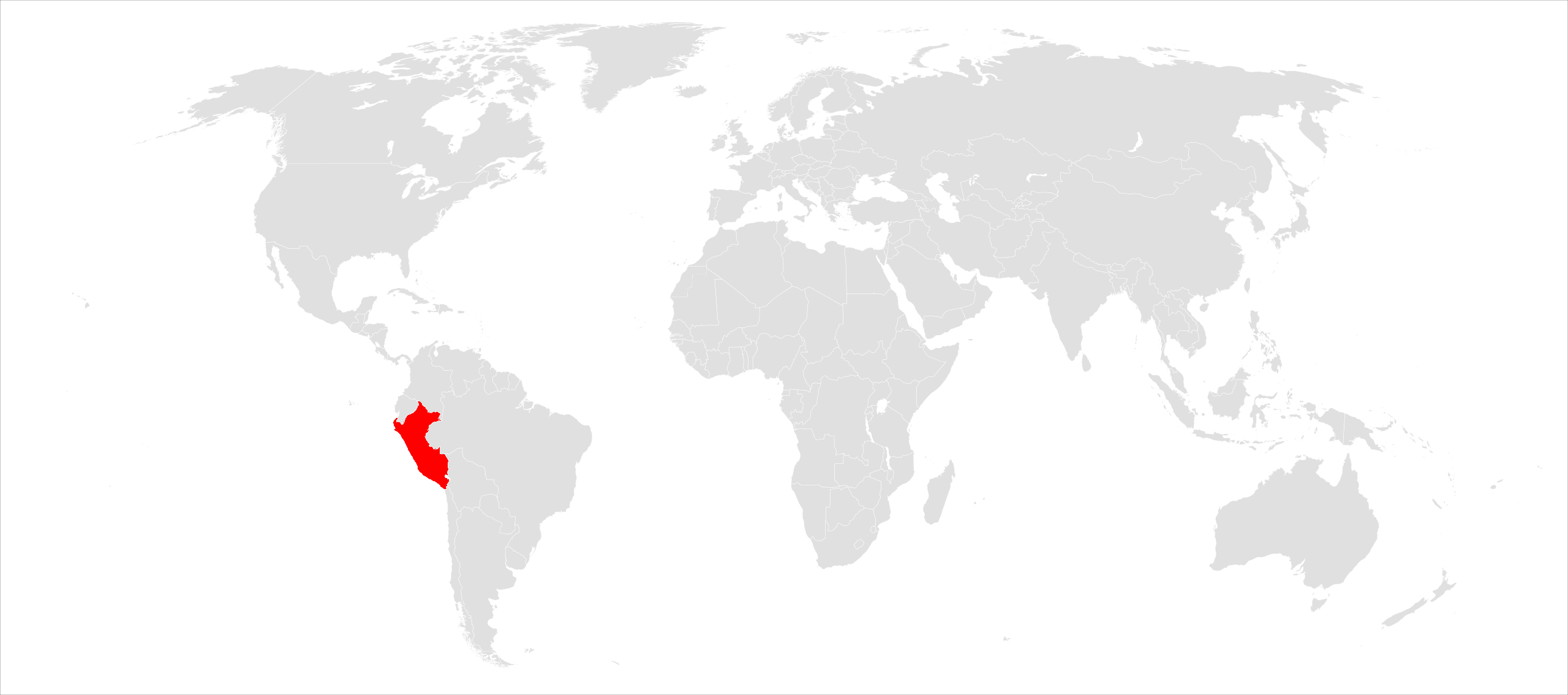
- Range of M. haemantha

Species of flowering plant

Malesherbia haemantha is an endangered shrub native to the desert and dry shrubland of Peru.

The flowers of M. haemantha closely resembles those of Malsherbia auristipulata and Malsherbia turbinea, as the flowers of the three species are red and have black anthers which produce black pollen. The corona of M. haemantha, however, is longer. M. haemantha can be distinguished from the other two species by its leaves which differ significantly from the other species.

These phenotypic observations and close proximity of the species suggest they are closely related and evolved from a shared ancestor.
