= Malesherbia laraosensis =

Scientific classification
- Kingdom: Plantae
- Clade: Tracheophytes
- Clade: Angiosperms
- Clade: Eudicots
- Clade: Rosids
- Order: Malpighiales
- Family: Passifloraceae
- Genus: Malesherbia
- Species: M. laraosensis

Binomial name
- Malesherbia laraosensis H.Beltrán & Weigend

Species of flowering plant

Malesherbia laraosensis is a member of Malesherbia (Passifloraceae) described in 2014 by Hamilton Beltran and Maximilian Weigend. It is the only member of the genus known to inhabit Laraos, Peru. It is described as a small shrub, with branch lengths up to 15 cm long, these features make it morphologically distinct from other Peruvian members of the genus. It has orange flowers with red tips, and flowers from May - July.
