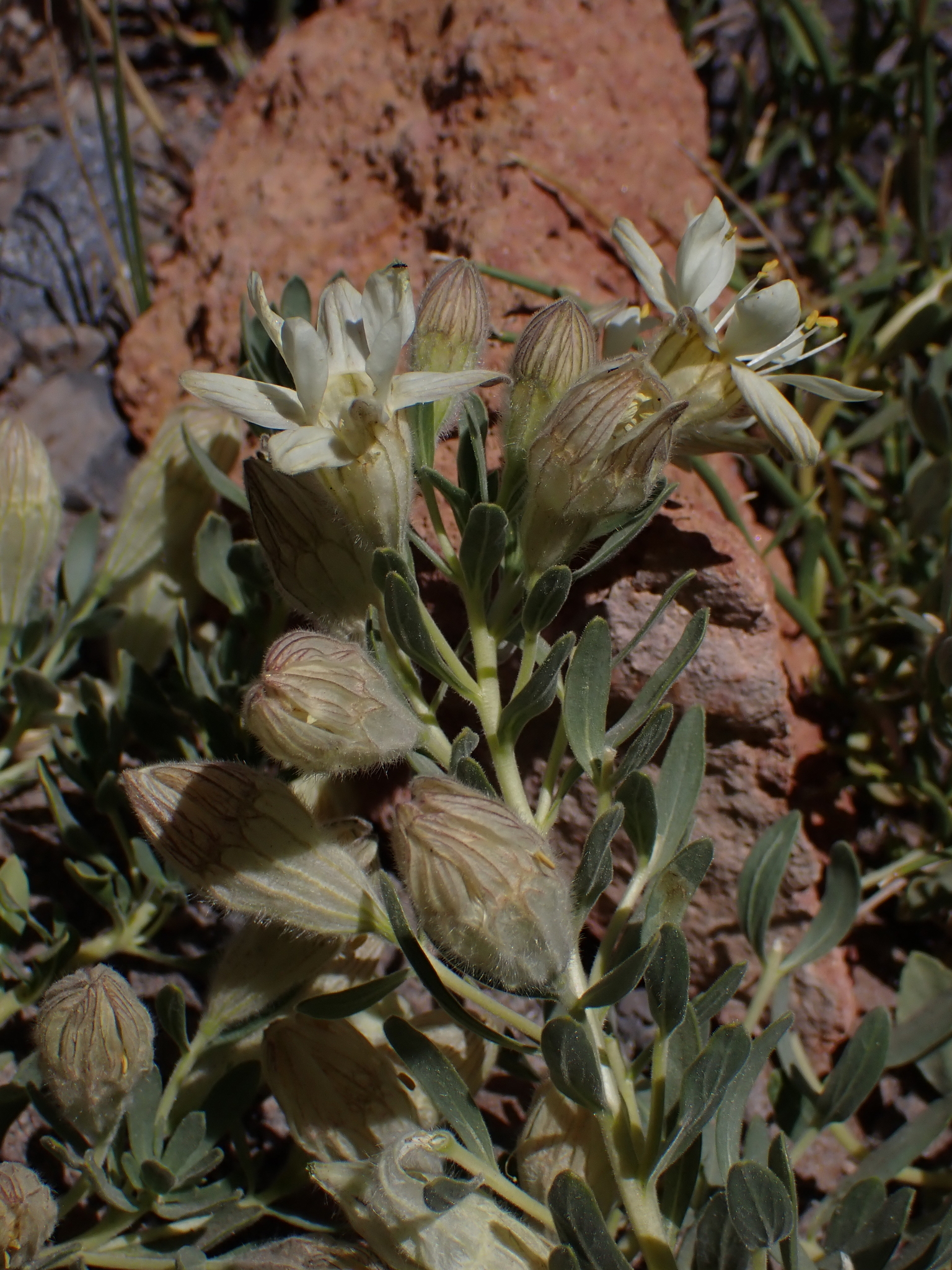

Scientific classification
- Kingdom: Plantae
- Clade: Tracheophytes
- Clade: Angiosperms
- Clade: Eudicots
- Clade: Rosids
- Order: Malpighiales
- Family: Passifloraceae
- Genus: Malesherbia
- Species: M. lirana

Binomial name
- Malesherbia lirana Gay

= Malesherbia lirana =

Species of flowering plant

Malesherbia lirana is a perennial herb whose native range is from Argentina and Chile. The species has racemose inflorescences that are 2 - 3.9 cm in size and cream colored petals. It flowers in spring to late summer.

== Variety ==
There are currently three accepted varieties of M. lirana, var. atacamensis (Bull-Hereñu), var. lirana, and var. subglabrifolia (Kuntze).

=== Malesherbia lirana var. atacamensis ===
Variety atacamensis is native to the slopes of the Andes. It differs from var. lirana as it's taller, has oblong shaped leaves, produces multiple flowers per stem, and its flowers have a shorter yellow corona.

=== Malesherbia lirana var. lirana ===
Variety lirana has protruding stamen, a trait unique to the variety.

Var. lirana has been reclassified a series of times, it has previously been classified as the following, Malesherbia cuneata, Malesherbia hieronymi, Malesherbia incana, Malesherbia lirana var. hieronymi, Malesherbia lirana var. subtomentosa, Malesherbia serpyllifolia.

=== Malesherbia lirana var. subglabrifolia ===
Variety subglabrifolia is found in the Mendoza, in Andean areas between elevations of 2300 and 2500. It has narrower and shorter floral tubes than var. lirana and less hairy leaves.

Var. subglabrifolia is commonly known as meloncillo. It is toxic to cattle and goat, when ingested the livestock will die. It was previously classified as Malesherbia mendocina.
