= Malesherbia corallina =

Scientific classification
- Kingdom: Plantae
- Clade: Tracheophytes
- Clade: Angiosperms
- Clade: Eudicots
- Clade: Rosids
- Order: Malpighiales
- Family: Passifloraceae
- Genus: Malesherbia
- Species: M. corallina

Binomial name
- Malesherbia corallina Muñoz-Schick & R.Pinto
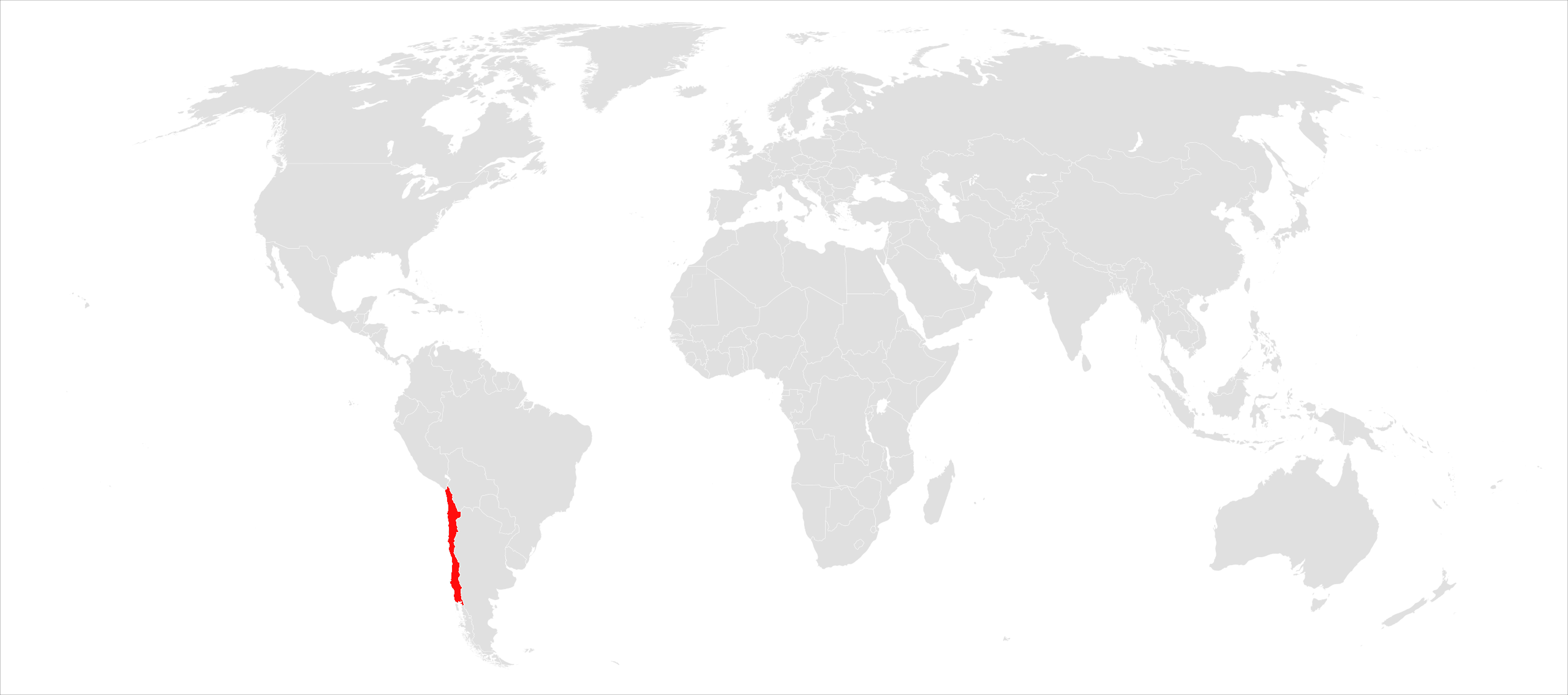
- Range of M. corallina as of 2023

Species of flowering plant

Malesherbia corallina, a member of Malesherbia (Passifloraceae), is a subshrub native to the deserts and dry shrubland of Tarapacá Chile. It was originally identified in 2003 by Mélica Muñoz-Schick and Pinto, and is considered very rare with less than 20 plants documented.

It has bright red flowers, velvety leaves, is gray with numerous stems, and can grow to be 40 cm tall.
