= Stapfiella ulugurica =

Scientific classification
- Kingdom: Plantae
- Clade: Tracheophytes
- Clade: Angiosperms
- Clade: Eudicots
- Clade: Rosids
- Order: Malpighiales
- Family: Passifloraceae
- Genus: Stapfiella
- Species: S. ulugurica

Binomial name
- Stapfiella ulugurica Mildbr.

Species of flowering plant

Stapfiella ulugurica is shrub native to Rwanda, Tanzania, and Zaïre, Africa. It is found at elevations of 1900–2100 meters.

S. ulugurica grows up to 1–2.5 meters tall. It has yellow flowers and black seeds.
