= Stapfiella zambesiensis =

Conservation status
- Least Concern (IUCN 3.1)

Scientific classification
- Kingdom: Plantae
- Clade: Tracheophytes
- Clade: Angiosperms
- Clade: Eudicots
- Clade: Rosids
- Order: Malpighiales
- Family: Passifloraceae
- Genus: Stapfiella
- Species: S. zambesiensis

Binomial name
- Stapfiella zambesiensis R.Fern.

Species of flowering plant

Stapfiella zambesiensis is a shrub native to Zambia, Africa. It is found east of Kasama.

S. zambesiensis grows up to 2 meters tall, yellow antrorse hairs on pubescent leaves, white homostylous raceme flowers, and "yellowish-brown" seeds.

== Varieties ==
Currently, there are two accepted varrities of S. zambesiensis; var. grandifolia and var. zambesiensis. Variety grandifolia may be an ecological form; it is found in the margins of swamp forests.

As of 1994, both varieties are classified as least concerned.
