= Malesherbia deserticola =

Scientific classification
- Kingdom: Plantae
- Clade: Tracheophytes
- Clade: Angiosperms
- Clade: Eudicots
- Clade: Rosids
- Order: Malpighiales
- Family: Passifloraceae
- Genus: Malesherbia
- Species: M. deserticola

Binomial name
- Malesherbia deserticola Phil.
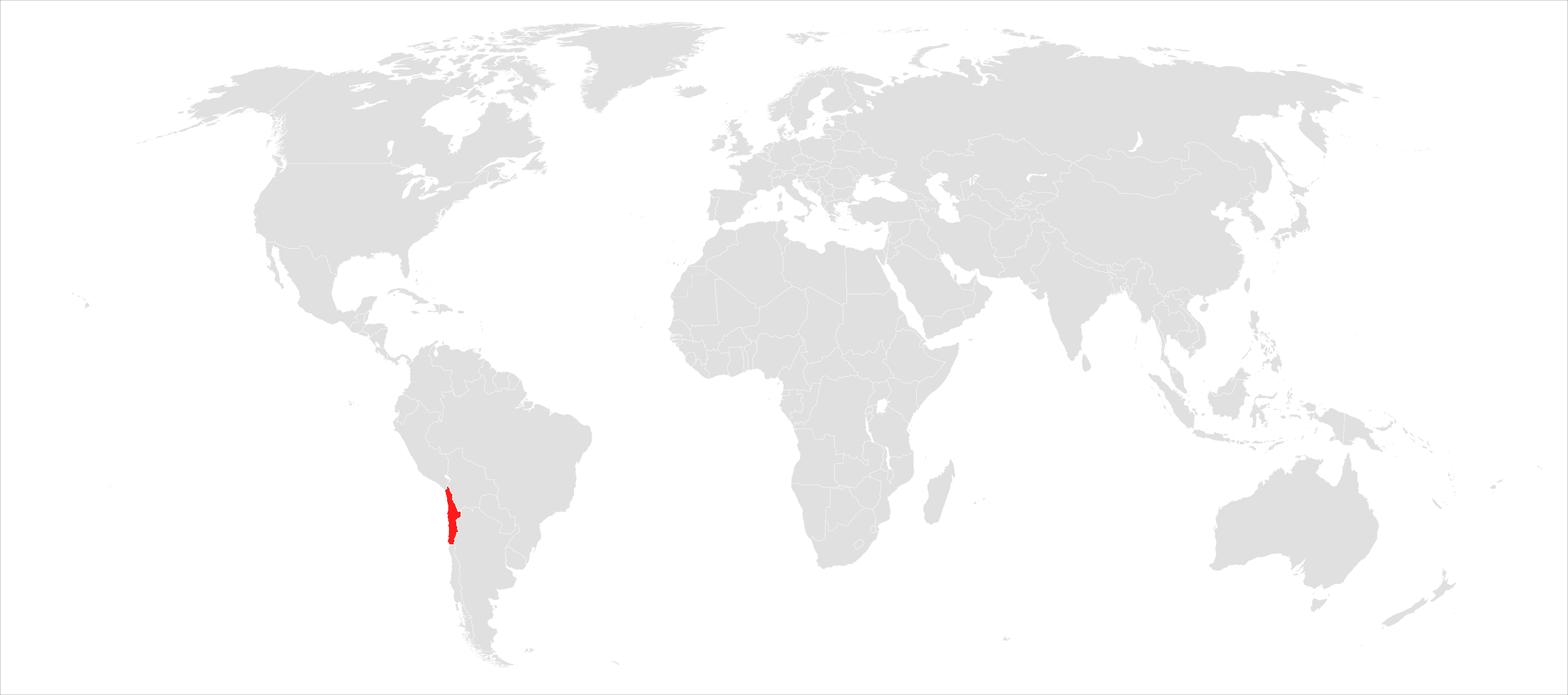
- Range of M. deserticola as of 2023

Synonyms
- Malesherbia borchersii

Species of flowering plant

Malesherbia deserticola is a subshrub native to the deserts and dry shrublands of Antofagasta and Atacama Chile. It can reach heights of 40 cm and has white racemose flowers.
