= Malesherbia densiflora =

Scientific classification
- Kingdom: Plantae
- Clade: Tracheophytes
- Clade: Angiosperms
- Clade: Eudicots
- Clade: Rosids
- Order: Malpighiales
- Family: Passifloraceae
- Genus: Malesherbia
- Species: M. densiflora

Binomial name
- Malesherbia densiflora Phil.
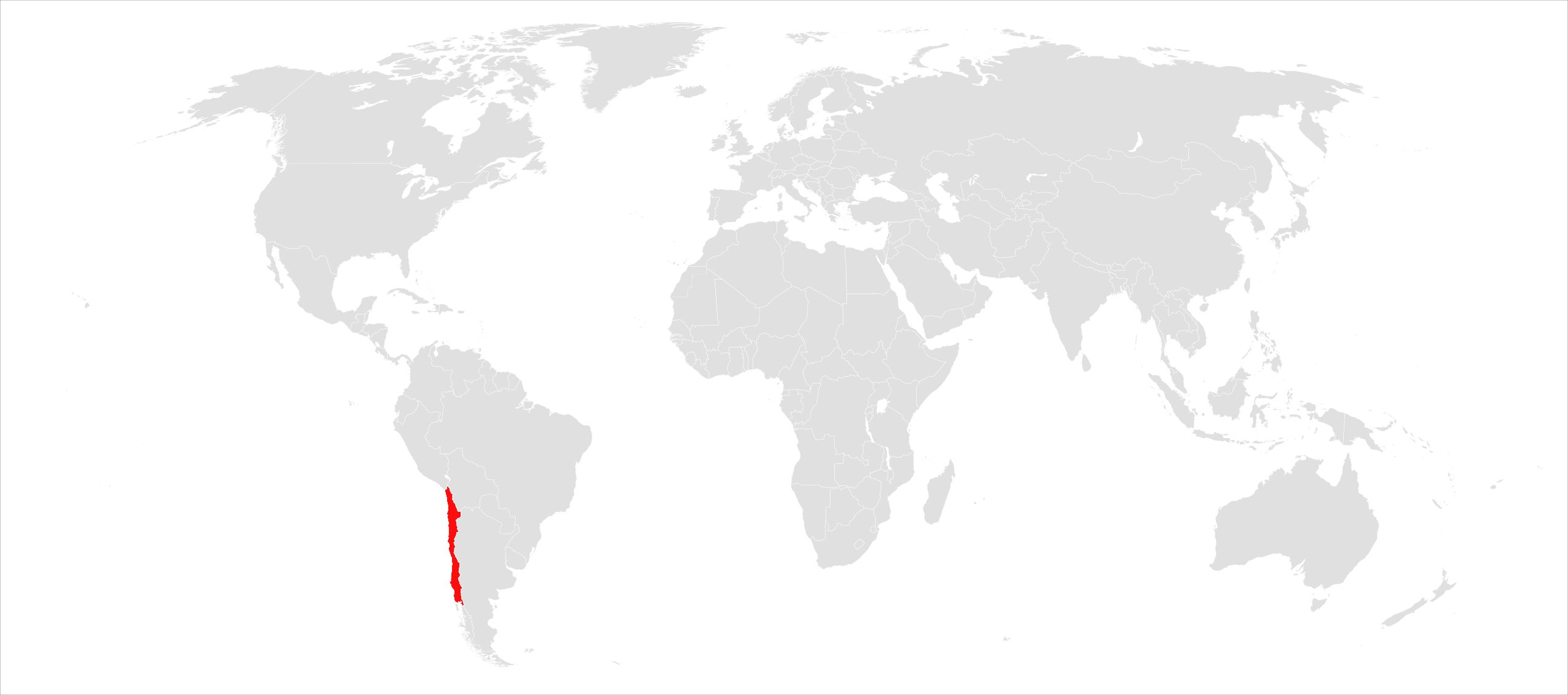
- Range of M. densiflora as of 2023

Species of flowering plant

Malesherbia densiflora is a perennial herb endemic to the Andean foothills in Atacama Chile. M. densiflora can grow up to 40 cm tall and has white racemose flowers.

It is estimated that the genera evolved around 5.6 million years ago.
