= Stapfiella =

Scientific classification
- Kingdom: Plantae
- Clade: Tracheophytes
- Clade: Angiosperms
- Clade: Eudicots
- Clade: Rosids
- Order: Malpighiales
- Family: Passifloraceae
- Subfamily: Turneroideae
- Genus: Stapfiella; Gilg
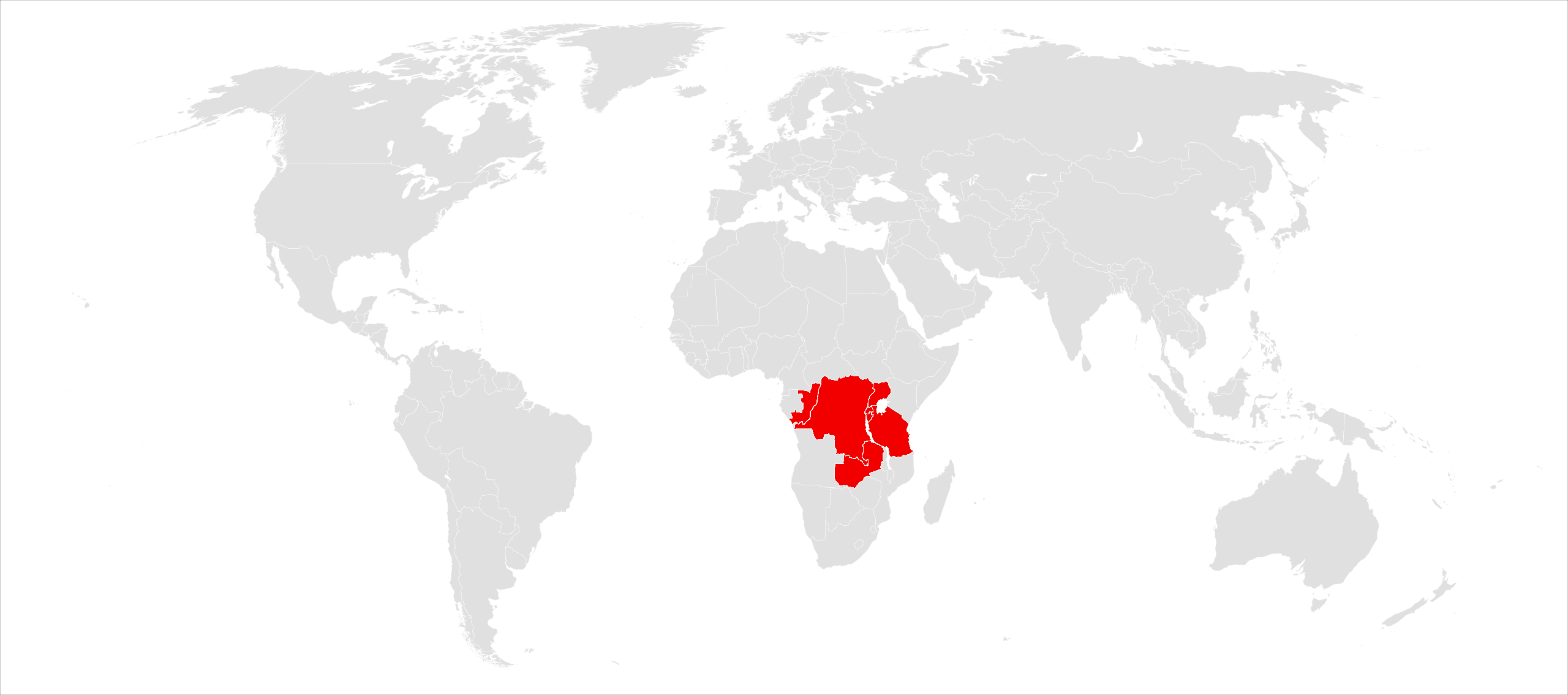

Genus of flowering plants

Stapfiella is a genus of flowering plants belonging to the family Passifloraceae. It is also in the Subfamily Turneroideae.

Its native range is Africa; it is found in Burundi, Congo, Rwanda, Tanzania, Uganda, Zambia and Zaïre.

The genus name of Stapfiella is in honour of Otto Stapf (1857–1933), an Austrian born botanist and taxonomist. It was first described and published in G.W.J. Mildbraed (ed.), Wiss. Erg. Deut. Zentr.-Afr. Exped., Bot. Vol.2 on page 571 in 1913.

== Known species ==
According to Kew;

- Stapfiella claoxyloides Gilg
- Stapfiella lucida Robyns
- Stapfiella muricata Staner
- Stapfiella ulugurica Mildbr.
- Stapfiella usambarica J.Lewis
- Stapfiella zambesiensis R.Fern.
