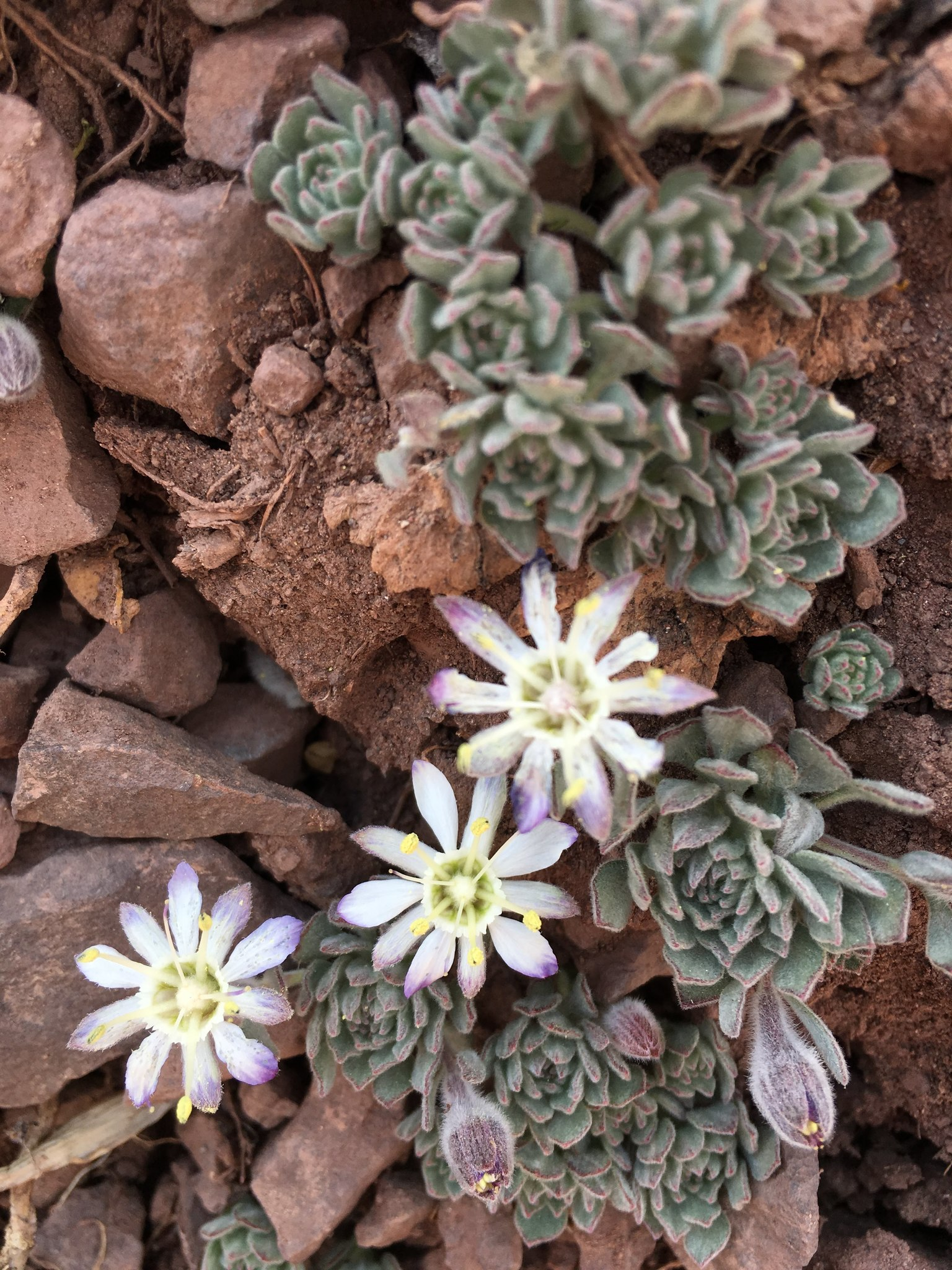
- In Copiapo, Atacama, Chile.

Scientific classification
- Kingdom: Plantae
- Clade: Tracheophytes
- Clade: Angiosperms
- Clade: Eudicots
- Clade: Rosids
- Order: Malpighiales
- Family: Passifloraceae
- Genus: Malesherbia
- Species: M. lactea

Binomial name
- Malesherbia lactea Phil.

Synonyms
- Malesherbia rosulata Werderm

= Malesherbia lactea =

Species of flowering plant

Malesherbia lactea is a perennial geophyte native to the La Rioja and San Juan regions of Argentina and the Antofagasta and Atacama regions of Chile. It has ovate leaves that end in a sharp point. Similar to other members of Malesherbia, the flowers are red and white, and tubular in shape.

There are two varieties of M. lactea, var. crassicaulis (Bull-Hereñu) and var. lactea. Variety crassicaulis differs from var. lactea in its thicker and longer stem. It grows at lower altitudes (2700 m) than var. lactea (2500 – 4300 m) and is considered more robust. Variety crassicaulis only grows in Atacama, while var. lactea grows throughout the native range of M. lactea. It is hypothesized that var. lactea differs in ploidy level, though this has not been supported by molecular work.

Variety crassicaulis was originally classified as Malesherbia rosulata.
