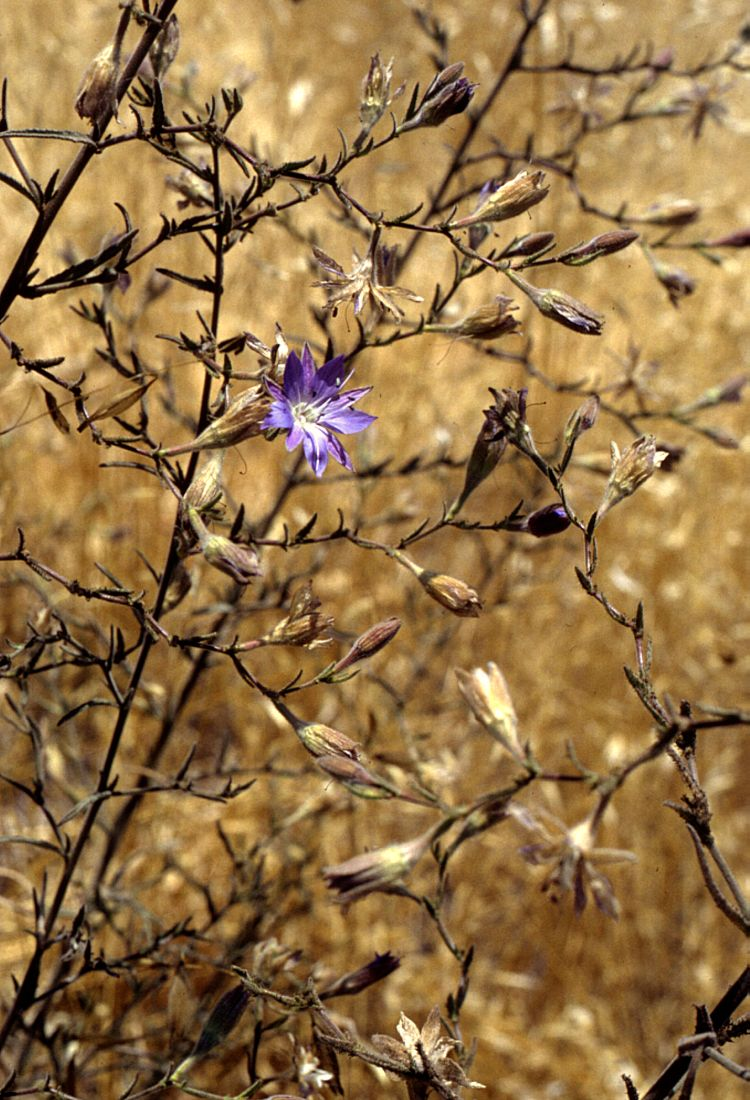
- Malesherbia linearifolia

Scientific classification
- Kingdom: Plantae
- Clade: Tracheophytes
- Clade: Angiosperms
- Clade: Eudicots
- Clade: Rosids
- Order: Malpighiales
- Family: Passifloraceae
- Subfamily: Malesherbioideae; Burnett
- Genus: Malesherbia; Ruiz & Pav.

Type species
- Malesherbia tubulosa Cav.

Species
- 25 species, see text
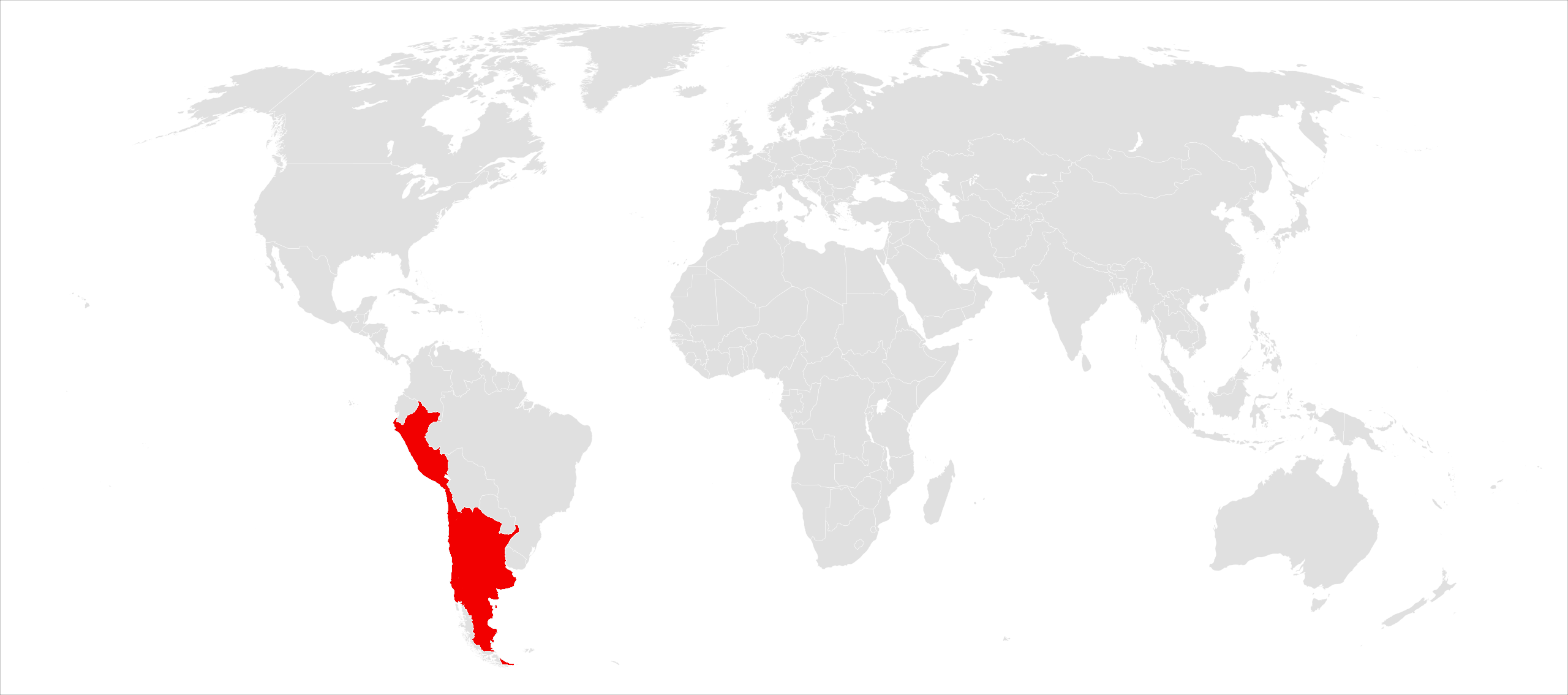
- Range of Malesherbia as of 2023

Synonyms
- Gynopleura Cav.

= Malesherbia =

Genus of flowering plants

Malesherbia is a genus of flowering plants consisting of 25 species in the family Passifloraceae. This is a xerophytic plant group native to the Peruvian and Chilean deserts and adjacent Argentina. The genus is currently recognized by the APG III system of classification in the family Passifloraceae, and is the sole member of the subfamily Malesherbioideae.

== Description ==
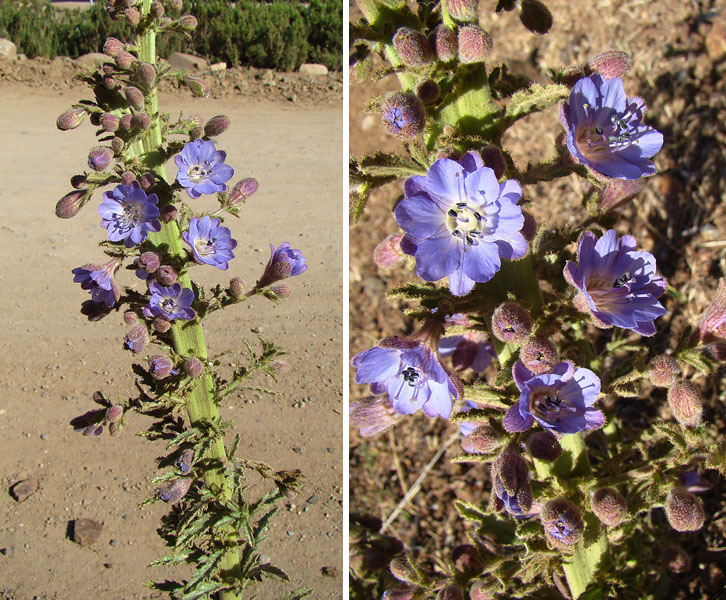
Malesherbia paniculata

Malesherbia is a genus of herbaceous plants and shrubs.

=== Flower morphology ===
Members of Malesherbia have perfect hermaphroditic flowers that come in various shades of red, pink, pale yellow, white, and purple. These are tube or funnel shaped, with 10 nerves, 5 sepals, 5 petals, 5 stamen and 3-4 styles. They have either solitary flowers opposite to leaves, or inflorescence that look like clusters.

== Taxonomy ==
The genus was described in 1794 by Hipólito Ruiz López and José Antonio Pavón Jiménez. Malesherbia was distinguished from other genera due to its small five parted limbus, ovulate open jaciniis, five petals that are inserted at the interstices of the throat of the calyx, five oblong and bilocular anthers, three pistils, and several other traits. The genus is named after Chrétien Guillaume de Lamoignon de Malesherbes. In the original description, the type species was not named.

In 1798, Antonio José Cavanilles would describe the genera under Gynopleura. Cavanilles admitted that Malesherbia was described exactly as Gynopleura, however, the seeds of Malesherbia were not described in the original text, and thus Cavanilles felt justified in publishing the genera under Gynopleura. Cacanilles would, however, establish M. tubulosa as the genera's type species.

=== Accepted species ===
- Malesherbia angustisecta Harms
- Malesherbia ardens J.F.Macbr.
- Malesherbia arequipensis Ricardi
- Malesherbia auristipulata Ricardi
- Malesherbia bracteata Phil.
- Malesherbia corallina Muñoz-Schick & R.Pinto
- Malesherbia densiflora Phil.
- Malesherbia deserticola Phil.
- Malesherbia fasciculata D.Don
- Malesherbia fatimae Weigend & H.Beltrán
- Malesherbia haemantha Harms
- Malesherbia humilis Poepp.
- Malesherbia lactea Phil.
- Malesherbia laraosensis H.Beltrán & Weigend
- Malesherbia linearifolia (Cav.) Poir.
- Malesherbia lirana Gay
- Malesherbia paniculata D.Don
- Malesherbia scarlatiflora Gilg
- Malesherbia solanoides Meyen
- Malesherbia splendens Ricardi
- Malesherbia tenuifolia D.Don
- Malesherbia tocopillana Ricardi
- Malesherbia tubulosa (Cav.) J.St.-Hil.
- Malesherbia turbinea J.F.Macbr.
- Malesherbia weberbaueri Gilg

=== Phylogeny ===
- - Outgroup
    Turnera
  - - M.lactea
    - - M.fasciculata
      - - Section Cyanpetal
          - M.linearifloria
          - M.paniculata
        - - Section Parvistella
            M.humilis
          - - Section Xeromontana
              - - M.densiflora
                - M.deserticola
              - - M.solanoides v. solanoides
                - M.lirana v. lirana
                - M.lirana v. subglab.
                - M.solanoides v. rugosa
                - - M.bracteata v. campanulata
                  - M.bracteata v. bracteata
            - Section Malesherbia
              - - M.tubulosa
                - - M.scarlatiflora
                  - M.splendens
                  - M.weberbaueri
              - - M.haemantha
                - - - - M.auristipulata
                      - M.turbinea
                    - - M.tocopillana
                      - M.ardens
                  - - M.arequipensis
                    - M.angustisecta
                    - M.tenuifolia

Please note, this phylogeny does not include Malesherbia laraosensis. As of 2022, a phylogenetic analysis including M. laraosensis has not been published.

== Uses ==
=== Medicinal ===
In Peru, Malesherbia ardens is used in traditional medicine to treat colds, coughs, bronchitis, and asthma. The entire plant along with others known as Contilo, Arabisca, and Huamanripa are brewed into a tea, which is consumed three times a day.

== Distribution ==
Members of Malesherbia are native to South America, specifically the arid and Andean regions of Perú, Chile and Argentina.
