= Malesherbia tocopillana =

Conservation status
- Endangered (MMA)

Scientific classification
- Kingdom: Plantae
- Clade: Tracheophytes
- Clade: Angiosperms
- Clade: Eudicots
- Clade: Rosids
- Order: Malpighiales
- Family: Passifloraceae
- Genus: Malesherbia
- Species: M. tocopillana

Binomial name
- Malesherbia tocopillana Ricardi

Species of flowering plant

Malesherbia tocopillana is a species of subshrub endemic to Tocopilla, Antofagasta Region in Chile. It is found in costal deserts at altitudes of 150 - 400 m. It reaches heights of 50 cm, has 25 - 65mm long leaves and simple racemes with pink flowers. It is considered a very rare plant, with only 9 live individuals documented, as such, it is classified as endangered.
