= Stapfiella usambarica =

Scientific classification
- Kingdom: Plantae
- Clade: Tracheophytes
- Clade: Angiosperms
- Clade: Eudicots
- Clade: Rosids
- Order: Malpighiales
- Family: Passifloraceae
- Genus: Stapfiella
- Species: S. usambarica

Binomial name
- Stapfiella usambarica J.Lewis

Species of flowering plant

Stapfiella usambarica is a shrub native to the Usambara mountains of Tanzania, Africa. It can be found at altitudes of 1900 - 2230 m. As of 2012, the conservation status of S. usambarica has not been evaluated.

Stapfiella usambarica can grow up to 3 meters (9.8 ft) tall, has 4–11 centimeters (1.6–4.3 in) long leaves, and white flowers. Flowers may be distylous, additional evidence is required.
