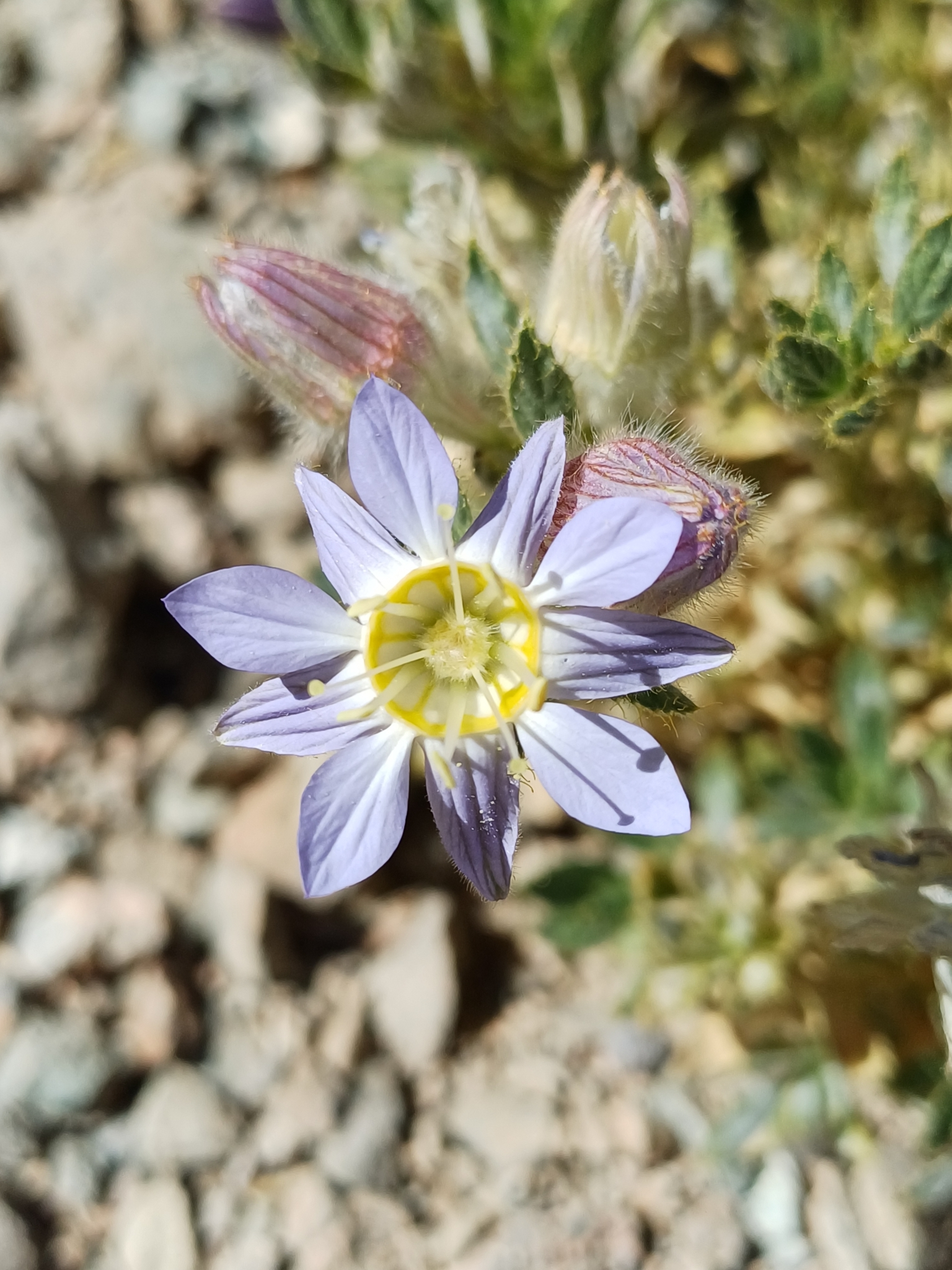

Scientific classification
- Kingdom: Plantae
- Clade: Tracheophytes
- Clade: Angiosperms
- Clade: Eudicots
- Clade: Rosids
- Order: Malpighiales
- Family: Passifloraceae
- Genus: Malesherbia
- Species: M. solanoides

Binomial name
- Malesherbia solanoides Meyen

Synonyms
- Malesherbia breviflora ((Phil.) Harms); Malesherbia obtusa (Phil.) var. obtusa

= Malesherbia solanoides =

Species of flowering plant

Malesherbia solanoides is a subshrub native to the Atacama region of Chile. It was initially described in 1833 by Reise Erde.

== Varieties ==
There are currently four accepted varieties of M. solanoides, var. oblongifolia ((Phil.) Bull-Hereñu), var. ovata ((Phil.) Bull-Hereñu), var. rugosa ((Gay) Bull-Hereñu), and var. solanoides.

=== Variety oblongifolia ===
Variety oblongifolia is found in the Paipote and San Andrés Ravines at altitudes above 1000 m. It has white flowers similar to those of var. ovata, it differs from var. ovata in its oblong hairless leaves and locality. Its white flowers differentiate it from var. rugosa and var. solanoides, both of white have blue flowers.

Var. oblongifolia has previously been classified as Malesherbia oblongifolia Phil., Malesherbia brevipedunculata Werderm., and Malesherbia foliosa Phil..

=== Variety ovata ===
Variety ovata is found in the deserts between Quebrada Encantada and Llano de Varas at altitudes of 1000 - 3000 m. It differs from var. solanoides and var. rugusa as it has white flowers; it differs from oblongifolia as it has yellow dense matted hairs on its vegetative tissues.

Var. ovata has previously been classified as Malesherbia ovata Phil., Malesherbia johnstonii Werderm., Malesherbia prolifera Phil., and Malesherbia rugosa var. pseudopulverulenta Ricardi.

=== Variety rugosa ===
Var. rugosa is only found in the Copiapó river valley in the Atacama region of Chile. Phenotypically, it's extremely similar to var. solanoides, only differing in its relatively rough oily leaves and smaller floral cup. The flowers of var. rugosa are typically light blue with large petals. In addition to these slight phenotypic differences, the varieties differ in range; var. rugosa is only found at altitudes of 1000 - 3000 m, while var. solanoides is found at lower altitudes (500 - 1200 m).

Var. rugosa has previously been classified as Gynopleura rugosa (Gay) Ball, Malesherbia rugosa Gay, Malesherbia glandulifera Werderm, and Malesherbia serrata Phil.

=== Variety solanoides ===
Var. solanoides is only found near the Copiapó river. It is found at altitudes of 500 - 1200 m. It grows up to 80cm tall and has light blue to violet flowers.
