= Malesherbia bracteata =

Scientific classification
- Kingdom: Plantae
- Clade: Tracheophytes
- Clade: Angiosperms
- Clade: Eudicots
- Clade: Rosids
- Order: Malpighiales
- Family: Passifloraceae
- Genus: Malesherbia
- Species: M. bracteata

Binomial name
- Malesherbia bracteata Phil.
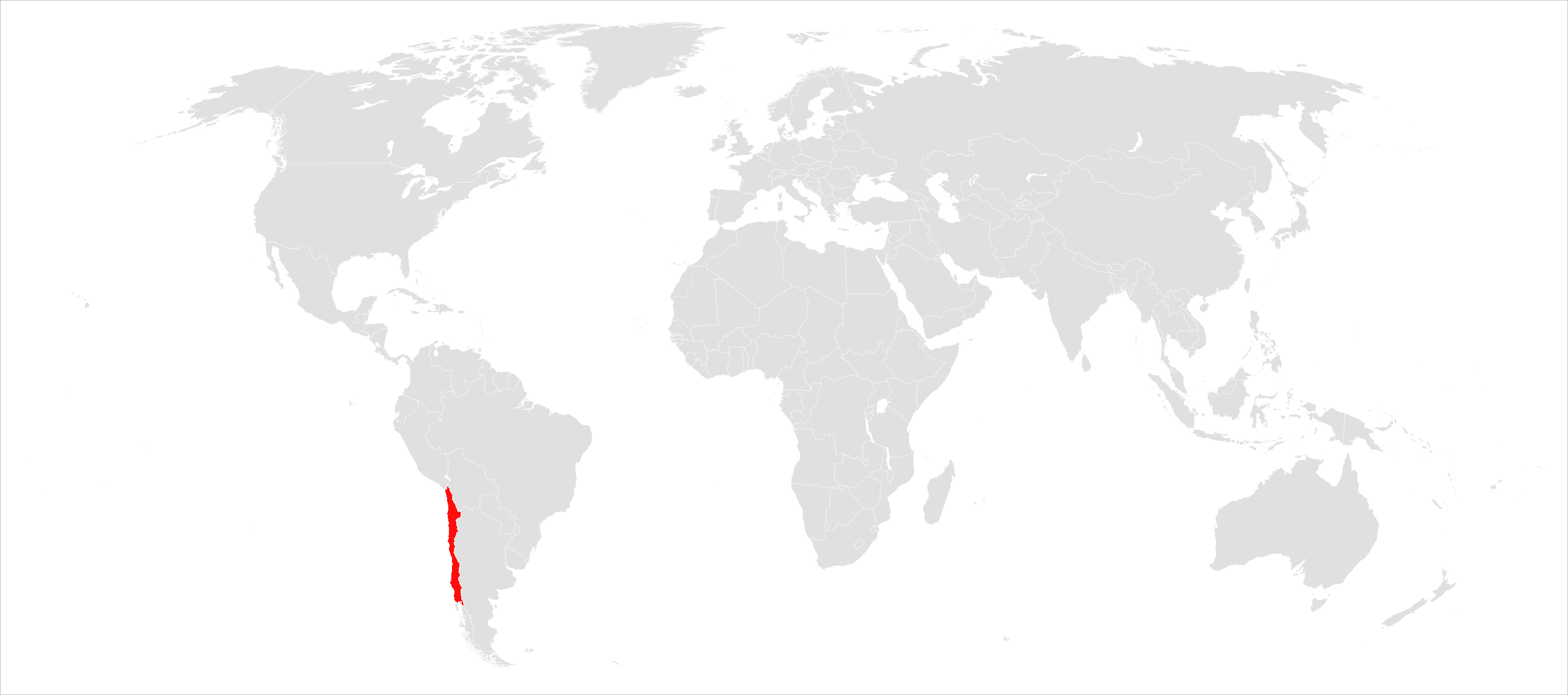
- Range of M. bracteata as of 2023

Species of flowering plant

Malesherbia bracteata is a perennial herb in Malesherbia (Passifloraceae). M. bracteata var. bracteata found in the deserts of the Andes and Coquimbo, while M. bracteata var. campanulata is only found around Embalse La Laguna. Malesherbia bracteata can grow up to 18mm and has white flowers. Variety campanulata differs from variety bracteata in terms of leaf shape, floral cup, and stipules.
