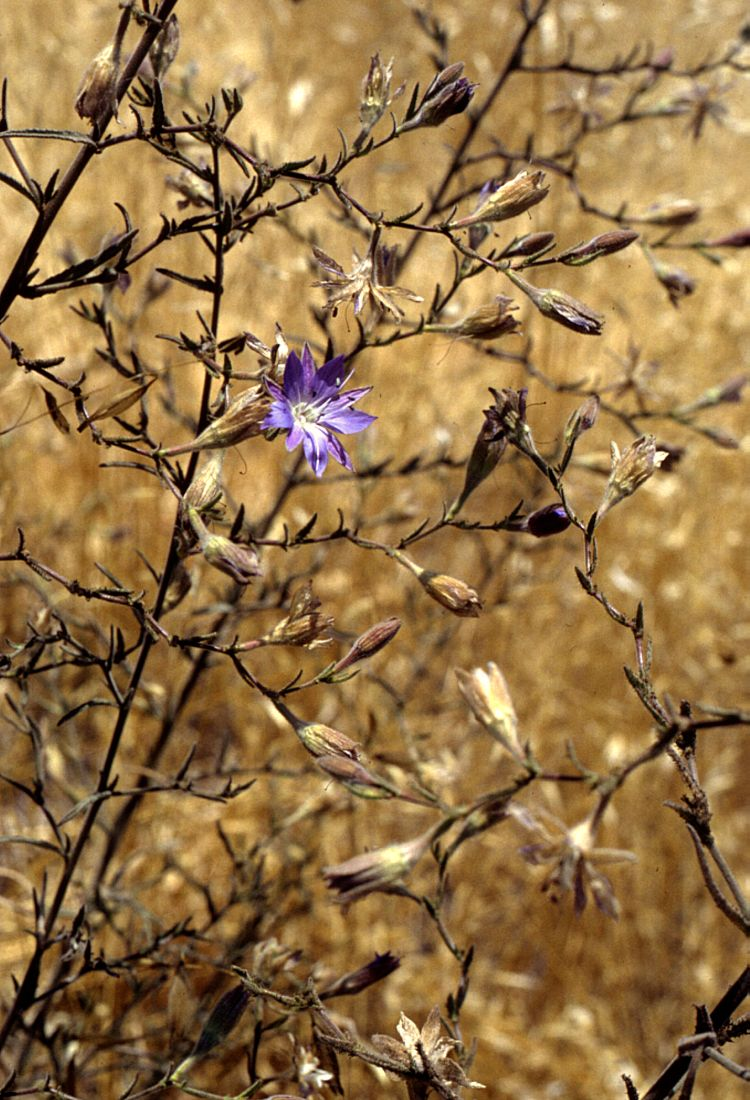

Scientific classification
- Kingdom: Plantae
- Clade: Tracheophytes
- Clade: Angiosperms
- Clade: Eudicots
- Clade: Rosids
- Order: Malpighiales
- Family: Passifloraceae
- Genus: Malesherbia
- Species: M. linearifolia

Binomial name
- Malesherbia linearifolia (Cav.) Poir.

Synonyms
- Gynopleura linearifolia Cav.; Gynopleura angustifolia Walp.; Malesherbia coronata D.Don; Malesherbia subalpina Poepp. & M.Roem

= Malesherbia linearifolia =

Species of flowering plant

Malesherbia linearifolia (vernacular name blue star of cordillera) is a subshrub endemic to the Coquimbo, Valparaiso, Metropolitana, and O'Higgins regions of Chile. It was the first member of Malesherbia to be described, with the original description dating to 1797 by Cavanilles.

Illustration of M. linearifolia obtained from Curtis's botanical magazine (1834)

Malesherbia linearifolia is phenotypically very similar to sister species M. paniculata; both grow from a rhizome, have cymose inflorescences, and their flowers are range from light blue to deep purple. They differ in their leaves, M. paniculata has pinnate leaves while M. linearifolia has narrow leaves. They also differ in range.

Malesherbia linearifolia is pollinated by Lasia aenea, Centris chilensis, and Centris cineraria.
