= Malesherbia auristipulata =

Ají de Zorra

Conservation status
- Critically Endangered (IUCN 3.1)

Scientific classification
- Kingdom: Plantae
- Clade: Tracheophytes
- Clade: Angiosperms
- Clade: Eudicots
- Clade: Rosids
- Order: Malpighiales
- Family: Passifloraceae
- Genus: Malesherbia
- Species: M. auristipulata

Binomial name
- Malesherbia auristipulata Ricardi
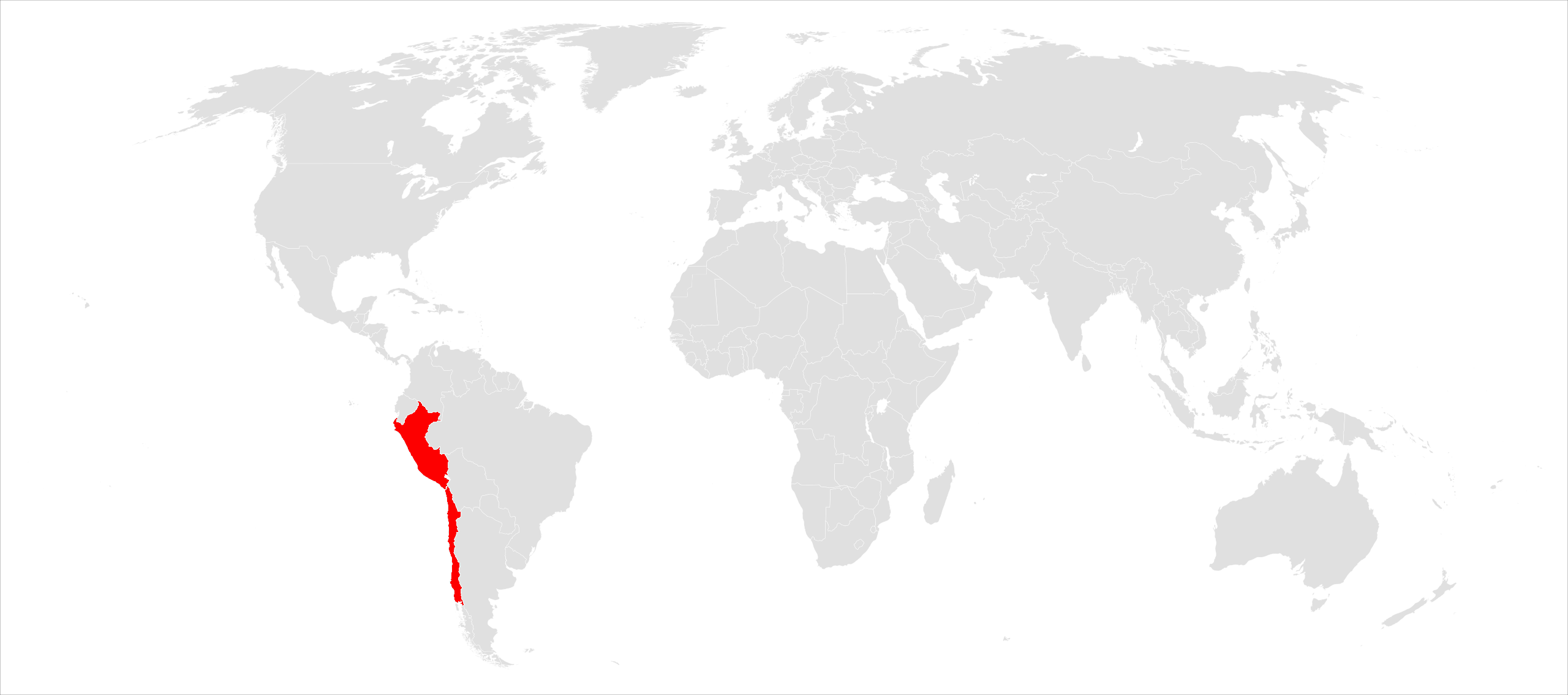

Species of flowering plant

Malesherbia auristipulata is a perennial woody shrub in the genus Malesherbia (Passifloraceae). Locally it is called Ají de Zorra. M. auristipulata is commonly found in Northern Chile and rarely in Tacna, Peru. In general, the species range is very restricted. As a result M. auristipulata is considered a rare plant. It is likely that there are less than 100 individuals left, classifying the species as critically endangered by the local government.

Malesherbia auristipulata synonymous with Malesherbia turbinea J.F. Macbr; though M. auristipulata is the accepted name.

== Morphology ==
Malesherbia auristipulata can grow up to 80 cm tall, it is described as a "woody" plant. Leaves are oblong, older leaves are 35-45 mm long by 8-12 mm wide, while younger leaves are 17-25 mm long by 3-6 mm wide.

The flowers of M. auristipulata are described as having tubes that are wider at the throat than the middle, a narrow corona, and blood red petals. They are raceme and range from 4 - 35 cm length. It has a dark stem, nearly black in color.

== Medicinal use ==
The aerial tissues of M. auristipulata secretes a resin like exudate that has anti-inflammatory and antimicrobial properties, with higher efficiency when treating infections of gram positive bacteria than gram negative in vitro. Its medicinal use may inspire the propagation, and ultimately salvation, of the species.
