= Ricardi =

Ricardi is an Italian language surname. It stems from the male given name Ricardo – and may refer to:

- Pablo Ricardi (1962), Argentine chess player
