= Malesherbia ardens =

Lampaya

Conservation status
- Endangered (IUCN 3.1)

Scientific classification
- Kingdom: Plantae
- Clade: Tracheophytes
- Clade: Angiosperms
- Clade: Eudicots
- Clade: Rosids
- Order: Malpighiales
- Family: Passifloraceae
- Genus: Malesherbia
- Species: M. ardens

Binomial name
- Malesherbia ardens J.F.Macbr.
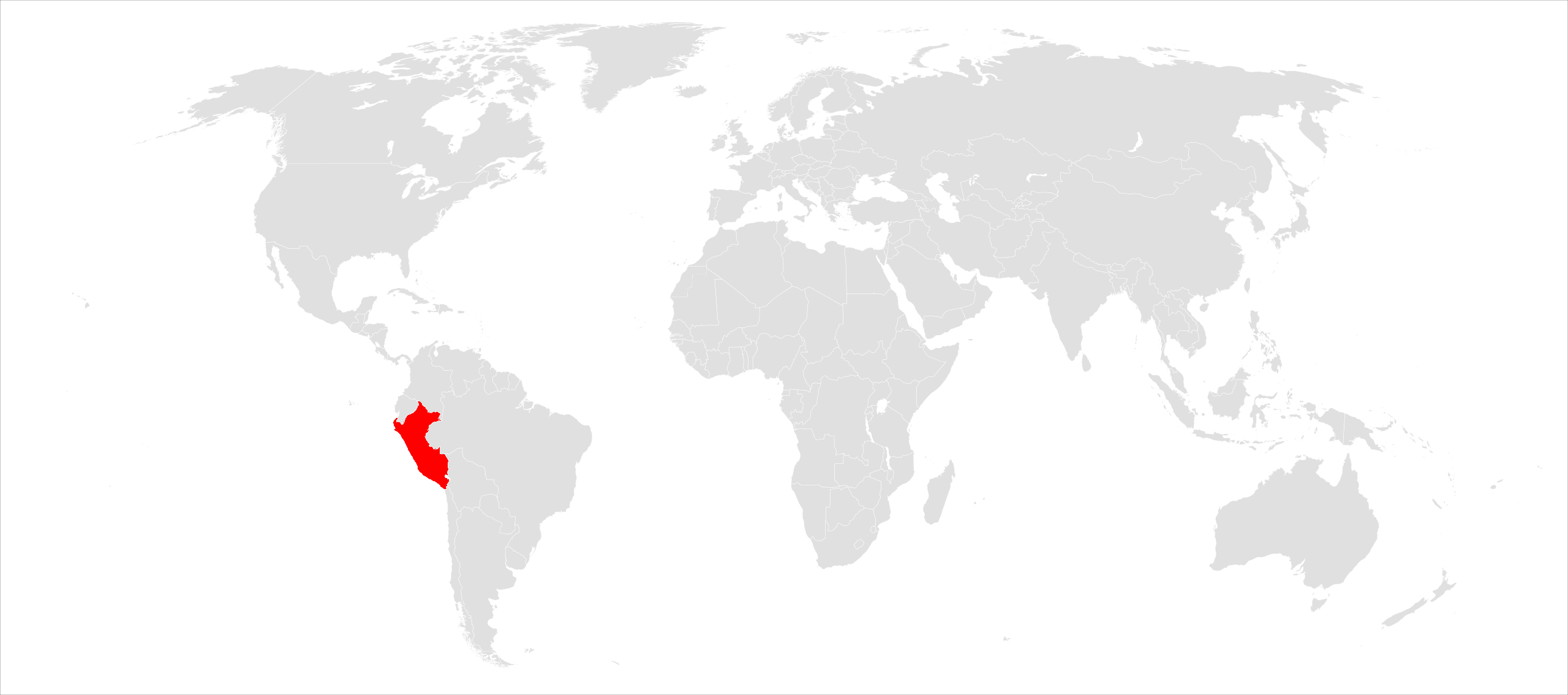
- Range of M. ardens as of 2023

Species of flowering plant

Malesherbia ardens, a member of Malesherbia (Passifloraceae), is a shrub with red flowers, colloquially called Lampaya.

== Description ==
=== Morphology ===
M. ardens is a shrub that can reach heights of 0.5meters. Its stems are covered in soft gray hairs. Its leaves are small and form clusters.

==== Flower morphology ====
M. ardens has red tubular flowers.

== Taxonomy ==
The oldest known record of M. ardens dates 1927 in the 4th volume of the Field Columbian Museums' Botanical series. James Francis Macbride is accredited with its discovery.

The specimen from which this species was described originated from a dry ravine in the hills southeast of Moquegua.

== Uses ==
M. ardens is used traditionally to treat colds, coughs, bronchitis, and asthma. The dried plant is boiled with Contilo, Arabisca and Huamanripa and drank three times a day.

== Distribution ==
M. ardens is native to the arid deserts of Southern Peru, though it can be found in the northern regions of the country. It has been identified in the General Sánchez Cerro, Mariscal Nieto, and Jorge Basadre provinces. It is found at altitudes of 1300 - 2800 meters.

== Conservation status ==
As of 2007, M. ardens is classified as endangered.
