= Malesherbia tenuifolia =

Conservation status
- VU (MMA)

Scientific classification
- Kingdom: Plantae
- Clade: Tracheophytes
- Clade: Angiosperms
- Clade: Eudicots
- Clade: Rosids
- Order: Malpighiales
- Family: Passifloraceae
- Genus: Malesherbia
- Species: M. tenuifolia

Binomial name
- Malesherbia tenuifolia D.Don

Synonyms
- Gynopleura tenuifolia (D.Don) M.Roem.; Malesherbia pulchra Phil.

Species of flowering plant

Malesherbia tenuifolia is a vulnerable subshrub native to Candarave, Peru and Tarapacá, Chile. It is found at altitudes of 1550-2400m. It can grow up to 150 cm tall, is ashy-green, and has dark red flowers.
