= Gilg =

Gilg is a surname. Notable people with the surname include:

- Candice Gilg (born 1972), French freestyle skier
- Deborah R. Gilg (born 1951), American lawyer
- Ernest Friedrich Gilg (1867–1933), German botanist
- Karl Gilg (1901–1981), German chess player

== See also ==
- Charlotte Gilg-Benedict (1872-1965), German botanist, wife of Ernest Friedrich
