= Max Joseph Roemer =

German botanist (1791–1849)

Max Joseph Roemer (1791, Munich – 1849) was a German botanist who worked in Weimar.

Roemer served as Landrichter (country judge) in the Bavarian town of Aub before working as a private scientist in Würzburg. and is the taxonomic authority of the genera Heteromeles, Pyracantha, and Erythrocarpus as well as numerous plant species.

== Publications ==
- Roemer, Max Joseph (1845–1847). Familiarum naturalium regni vegetabilis synopses monographicae; seu, Enumeratio omnium plantarum hucusque detectarum secundum ordines naturales, genera et species digestarum, additis diagnosibus, synonymis, novarumque vel minus cognitarum descriptionibus (4 fascicles). Weimar: Landes-Industrie-Comptoir.
