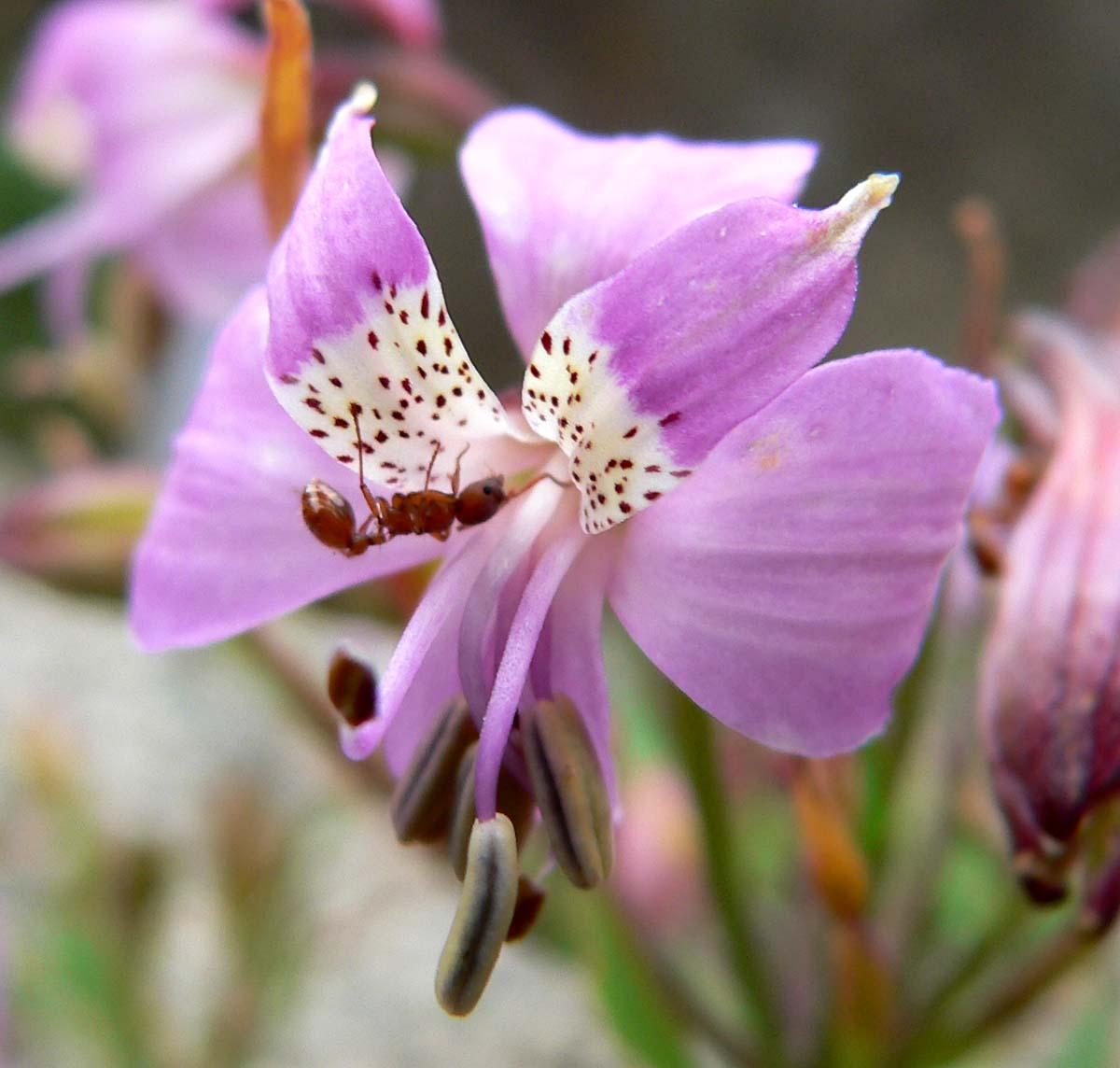
- Alstroemeria revoluta

Scientific classification
- Kingdom: Plantae
- Clade: Tracheophytes
- Clade: Angiosperms
- Clade: Monocots
- Order: Liliales
- Family: Alstroemeriaceae
- Tribe: Alstroemerieae; Bernh

Genera
- Alstroemeria; Bomarea; (The monotypic genera Schickendantzia and Taltalia have been included within Alstroemeria; the monotypic Leontochir was included in Bomarea.)

= Alstroemerieae =

Tribe of plants

Alstroemerieae is the name of a tribe of monocotyledonous, herbaceous, perennial plants belonging to the Alstroemeriaceae family. They are native to Central and South America. They have very vivid flowers, relatively large and of various colors. Because of the beauty of their flowers, they are often used as ornamental plants and, especially, as cut flowers.

The tribe consists of around 230 species distributed in two genera: Bomarea and Alstroemeria. Until a few years ago, this family was considered part of a broad circumscription of the Liliaceae, but DNA molecular analyses and phylogenetic analyses based on both molecular data as well as morphology and anatomy, have shown that they belong to a separate family.

== Description ==
Herbaceous, erect plants or supporting lianas, with sympodial rhizomes. Some of the roots are thickened and contain starch. The stem is foliose. Leaves are linear to lanceolate or oblong, rather broad in relation to other monocots, entire, narrowing towards the base, usually resupinated, that is, twisted in such a way that the upper surface during its development becomes lower at maturity.

The inflorescences are terminal and umbelliform, forming helical cymes, usually surrounded by a bract involucre, rarely reduced to a single flower.

The flowers are very bright, relatively large, hermaphrodite, trimerous, actinomorphic to slightly zygomorphic. The perigonium consists of 6 free tepals at the base, arranged in two cycles. The color of the flowers can be yellow, red, pink, orange or green, depending on the species and variety; generally with dark spots. They have nectaries at the base of two of the inner tepals. The androecium is formed by 6 stamens, arranged in two cycles, with the filaments free from each other and free from the tepals, narrow, alternating with the pieces of the perianth. The anthers are basifixed, not versatile, with introrse and longitudinal dehiscence. Microsporogenesis is successive and the tapetum is glandular. Pollen grains are sulcate, usually plano-convex and composed of two cells. The gynoecium has an inferoid, trilocular ovary with numerous anatropic ovules with axillary placentation. The fruit is a loculicidal capsule, umbonate or truncate apically, with 6 longitudinal ribs.

The seeds are round or spheroidal, with the embryo small in relation to the endosperm, at maturity with dry tegument in Alstroemeria and sarcotesta in Bomarea.

Calcium oxalate raphides are present in different organs.

=== Cytology ===
Diploid Bomarea species have one chromosome pair more (2n=18) than Alstroemeria species (2n=16); however, they have a shorter total chromosome length. Another difference between the two genera is that Bomarea species have more symmetrical karyotypes. Karyotypic analyses on these species indicate that there are considerable karyological differences between the two genera.

== Distribution ==
Bomarea is distributed from central Mexico and the Antilles (24°N) to Argentina (29°S) and Chile (40°S).

Alstroemeria is strictly South American, with species occurring from Venezuela (3°N) to Tierra del Fuego in Argentina (53°S).

== Phylogeny and taxonomy ==
Alstroemerieae is related to Luzuriageae (a tribe with 2 genera and 5 species), native to South America (Luzuriaga) and Australia and New Zealand (Drymophila). The two tribes share vegetative characters such as being vines with resupinate leaves. Both should perhaps be combined into a single family, although APWeb still (January 2009) keeps them separate.

Colchicaceae is also related to Alstroemerieae and Luzuriageae. Some genera of Colchicaceae have twisted leaves, as do Alstroemerieae and Luzuriageae. Petermannia was included in Colchicaceae in APG (1998) and APG II (2003), although it was later determined that this genus (considered a family by APW) is also related to the three families mentioned.

The complete cladogram is given below (APW, updated to January 2009, based mainly on the analysis of Fay et al. 2006, the relationships suggested by the rbcL study of Janssen and Bremer 2004 are quite different, but did not include Petermanniaceae and Corsiaceae):

- Liliales
  - Corsiaceae
  - Campynemataceae
  - branch with support of 50‑80%
    - Melanthiaceae
    - branch with 50‑80% support
      - Petermanniaceae
      - - Colchicaceae
        - - Luzuriagaceae
          - Alstroemeriaceae
    - - - Rhipogonaceae
        - Philesiaceae
      - - Smilacaceae
        - Liliaceae

=== The genera of Alstroemeriaceae ===
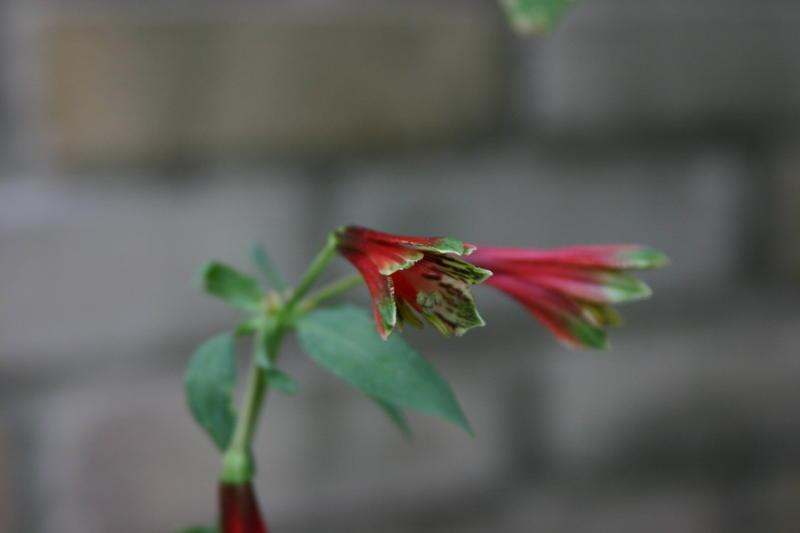
Inflorescence of Alstroemeria psittacina, known as "parrot lily", a species native to Brazil and northeastern Argentina

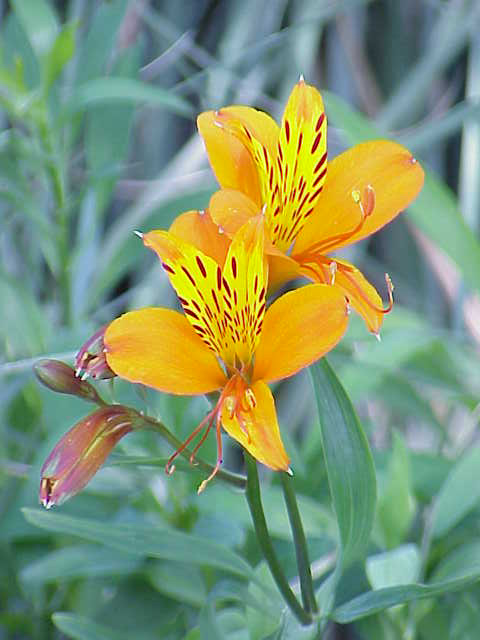
Inflorescence of Alstroemeria aurantiaca, a species native to southern Chile and Argentina

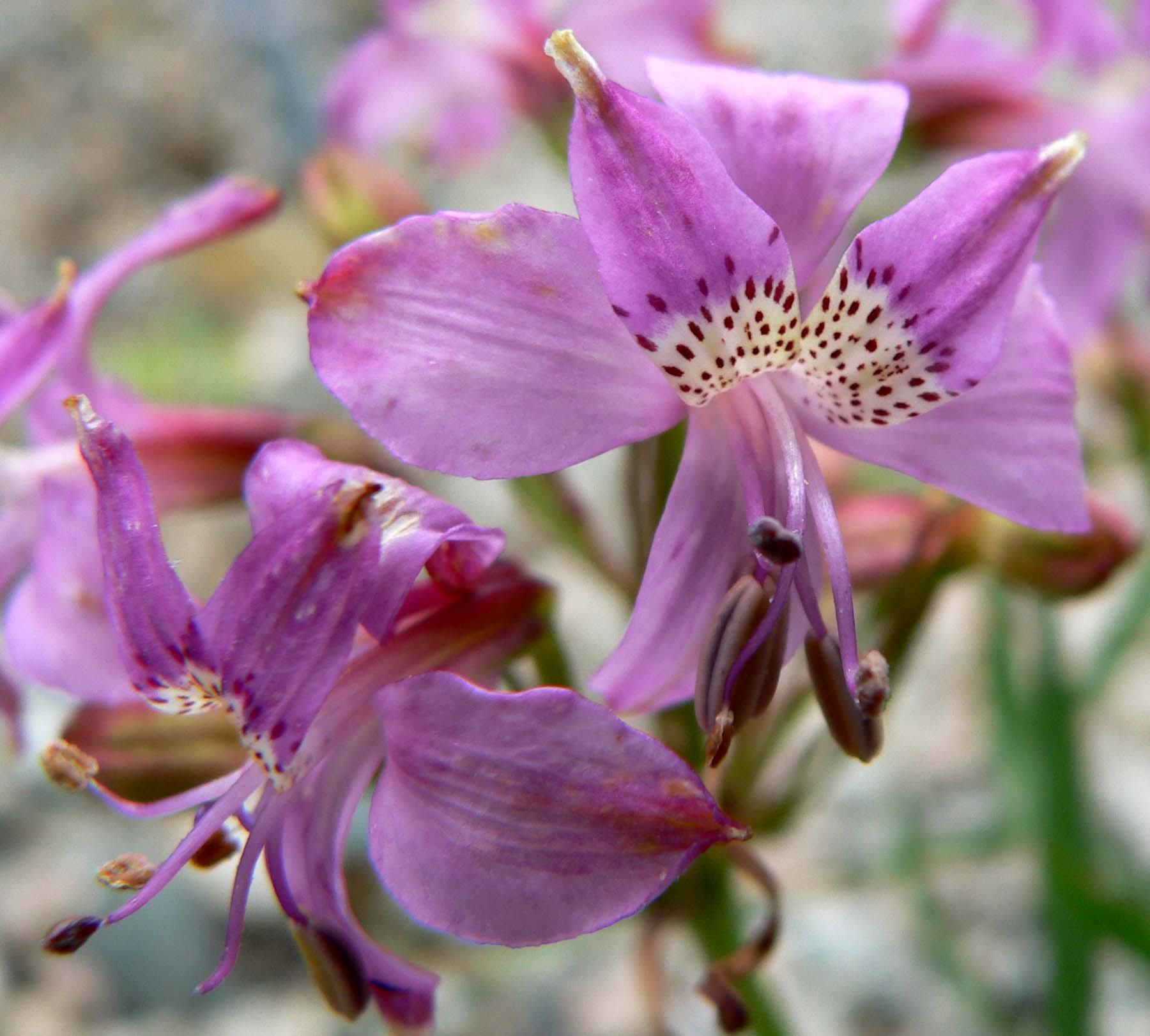
Alstroemeria revoluta, photograph taken at the botanical gardens of the University of British Columbia

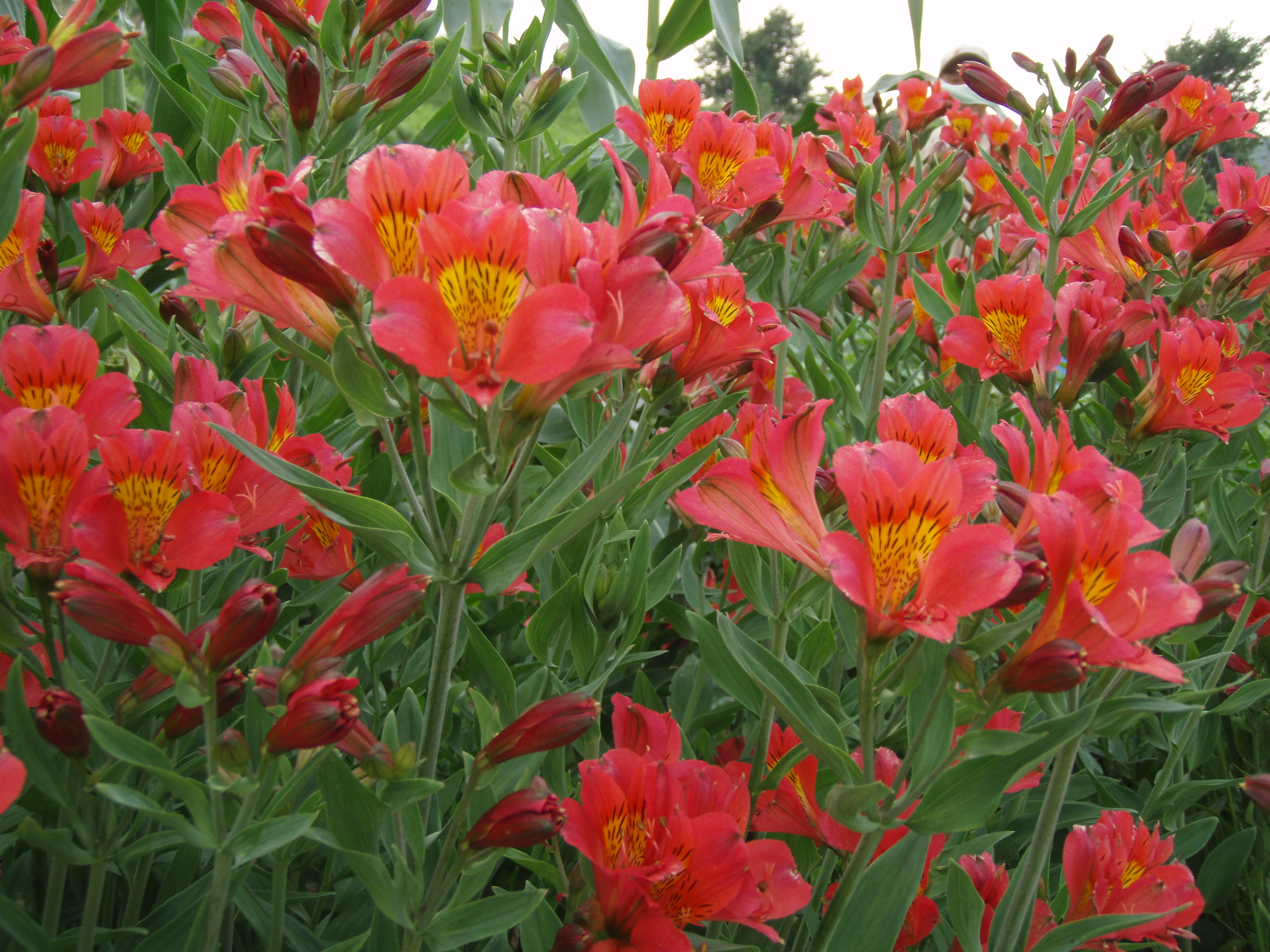
A modern cultivar of Alstroemeria

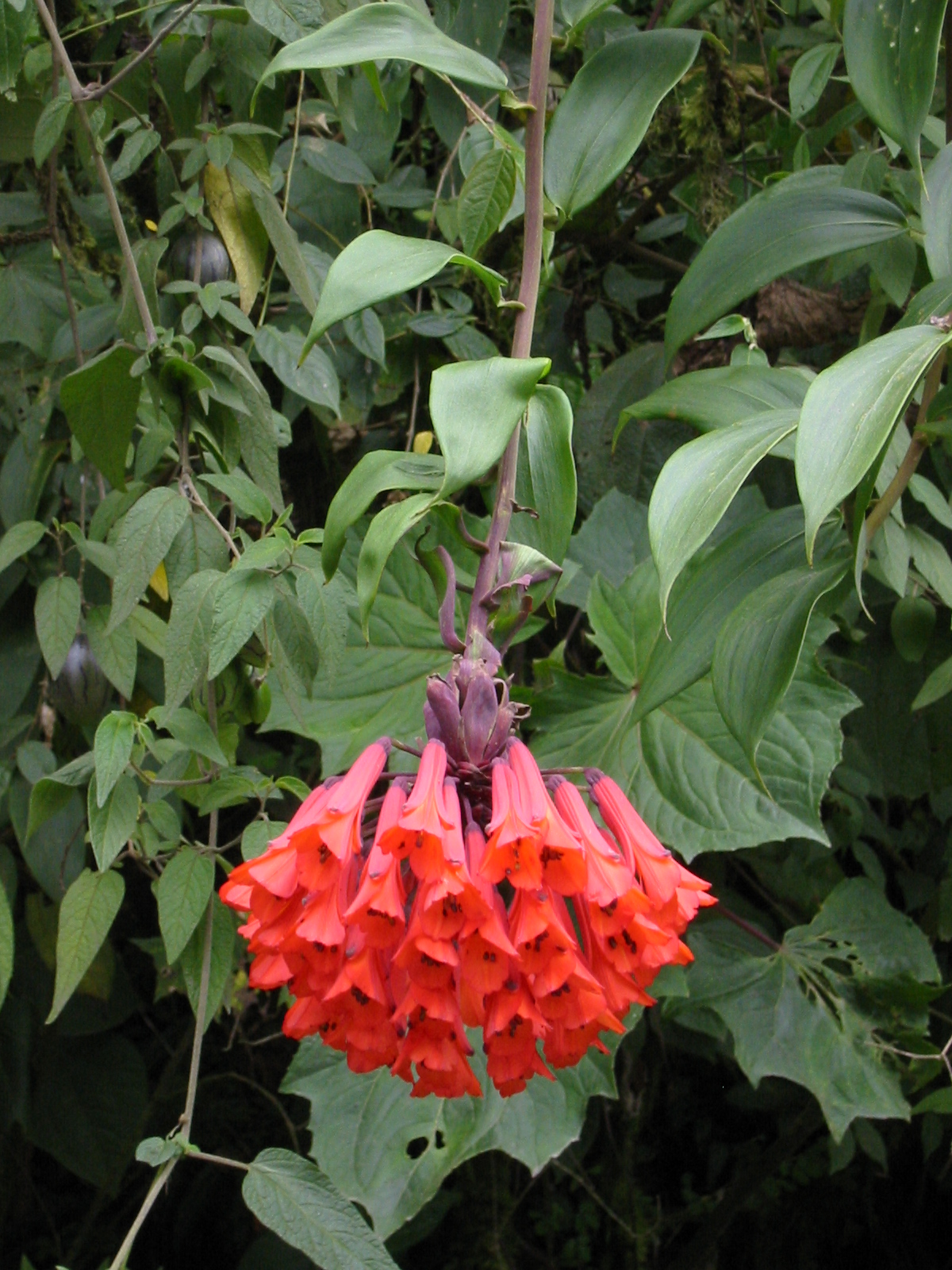
Inflorescence of a Bomarea species photographed in southern Ecuador

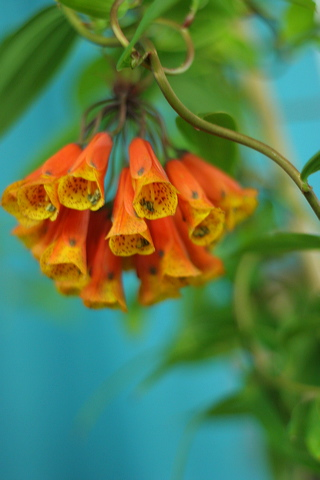
Inflorescence of Bomarea caldasii

Several revisions of Alstroemeriaceae list four genera within the family: Alstroemeria, Bomarea, Schickendantzia and Leontochir, with the addition of the genus Taltalia in 1998. However, the monotypic genera Schikendantzia and Taltalia have been included within Alstroemeria on the basis of detailed morphological, anatomical and chromosomal studies. On the other hand, Leontochir ovallei, the only representative of its genus, has been shown in molecular and morphological analyses to be associated and interbred with Bomarea species, so it cannot be recognized as a separate genus. It was transferred in 2000 to Bomarea, as Bomarea ovallei.

The exact number of species in both genera is difficult to pinpoint exactly since new species are constantly being discovered for science and there are also nomenclatural problems.

- Alstroemeria L., Pl. Alströmeria: 8 (1762). Includes 122 species distributed from southern Venezuela to southern South America. The following names are considered synonyms of this genus:
  - Ligtu Adans., Fam. Pl. 2: 20 (1763).
  - Lilavia Raf., Fl. Tellur. 4: 35 (1838).
  - Priopetalon Raf., Fl. Tellur. 4: 34 (1838).
  - Schickendantzia Pax, Bot. Jahrb. Syst. 11: 322 (1889).
  - Taltalia Ehr.Bayer, Sendtnera 5: 7 (1998).
- Bomarea Mirb., Hist. Nat. Pl. 9: 71 (1804). Includes 113 species distributed throughout tropical and subtropical America. The following genus names are considered synonyms of Bomarea:
  - Vandesia Salisb., Trans. Hort. Soc. London 1: 332 (1812).
  - Collania Herb., Amaryllidaceae: 103 (1837).
  - Sphaerine Herb., Amaryllidaceae: 106 (1837).
  - Dodecasperma Raf., Fl. Tellur. 4: 35 (1838).
  - Wichuraea M.Roem., Nat. Syn. Fam. Monogr. 4: 177 (1847).
  - Danbya Salisb., Gen. Pl.: 57 (1866).
  - Leontochir Phil., Anales Univ. Chile 43: 544 (1873).

== Economic and cultural importance ==
=== As food ===
Bomarea edulis is distributed from Mexico to Argentina, its tuberous roots have been used since pre-Columbian times as food. In fact, a well-developed plant can have up to 20 root tubers up to 5 cm in diameter.

=== As ornamental plants ===
Some of the alstroemeria species cultivated as ornamental plants are:

- Alstroemeria aurea: native to southern Chile, including Chiloé, it grows in moist undergrowth. It flowers in summer. The plants multiply rapidly thanks to their fine fleshy roots. The stems reach up to 1 m in height. The leaves are lanceolate. The flowers are 3 to 4 cm in diameter, yellow to orange in color and the outer tepals are spotted with greenish tones. For cultivation in the garden, places with moist soil in full sun or partial shade are recommended. It is the most hardy species of the genus, tolerating up to −15 °C if the roots are protected.
- Alstroemeria haemantha: native to Chile, especially in the Valparaiso region. It grows on well-drained rocky slopes. It flowers in early summer. It reaches a height of 1 m and the leaves are glaucous on the underside. The flowers are up to 5 cm in diameter and are red to deep orange. The outer tepals are oblong to obovate. It is resistant to temperatures as low as −15 °C.
- Alstroemeria ligtu: native to Chile, it grows in dry stony and sandy soils. It flowers in late spring and early summer and grows between 60 cm and 1 m tall. The flowers are of various colors, usually lilac and pink, reddish or whitish. In the wild, the flowers of this species are pink but the flowers or plants that are marketed as "ligtu hybrids" are actually the product of a cross between A. ligtu and A. haemantha, obtained by Clarence Elliott in 1927, when he introduced the parental species to England from Chile. In gardens, it is recommended to be grown in well-drained soil in full sun.
- Alstroemeria psittacina is a species that is distributed throughout the Cerrado and Pantanal in Brazil, in Peru and extends southward to the province of Misiones in Argentina. It is a plant about 40 to 60 cm high, with oblong-lanceolate leaves, obtuse at the apex and attenuated at the base. The flowers, 4 to 5 cm long, are arranged in umbels of 5 to 6 flowers. The tepals are red in the lower two thirds, greenish at the apex and spotted. It should be grown in well-drained soil, moist in summer.
- Bomarea ovallei (syn.: Leontochyr ovallei) is a species endemic to Chile that inhabits stony soils, in full sun, in a restricted coastal area of the III region of Chile. It has red flowers, more rarely yellow, gathered in showy inflorescences up to 10 cm in diameter. This species is known as "lion's claw" or "lion's hand". It is an endangered species because of its restricted distribution and because its tubers are food for guanacos and other animals introduced into its natural habitat. It has great potential as an ornamental species.

=== Hybrid alstroemerias: origin and genetic improvement ===
Most modern cultivars of alstroemeria do not belong to a particular species but are the result of interspecific hybridization programs. For that reason, modern cultivars, which cannot be ascribed to any particular species, are collectively referred to as Alstroemeria hybrida. The vast majority of modern cultivars, whose breeding was initiated at the Dutch company Van Straaveren in Aslsmeer, are intended to supply the cut flower market. However, some of them can also be used as excellent garden plants.

Originally, these cultivars came from hybridization between Alstroemeria aurea (used in breeding to incorporate strong, tall stems in hybrid cultivars), Alstroemeria pelegrina (its value in breeding programs lies in its large flowers) and A. ligtu (used for their different colors). As the decades passed, many other species were added to these initial three, such as: A. pelegrina alba, A. angutifolia, A. diluta, A. hookeri, A. kingii, A. magenta, A. magnifica, A. pulchra, A. revoluta, and A. werdermannii. There are barriers to hybridization between Alstroemeria species from Chile and those from Brazil. Successful interspecific hybrids have been obtained by in vitro culture of immature hybrid embryos. The cultivars 'Patriot', 'Freedom', 'Redcoat' and 'Liberty' have been produced using this technique. In addition, tetraploids (2n=4x=32) of several sterile hybrids have been successfully produced using in vitro chromosome duplication techniques.

== See also ==
- Luzuriageae
