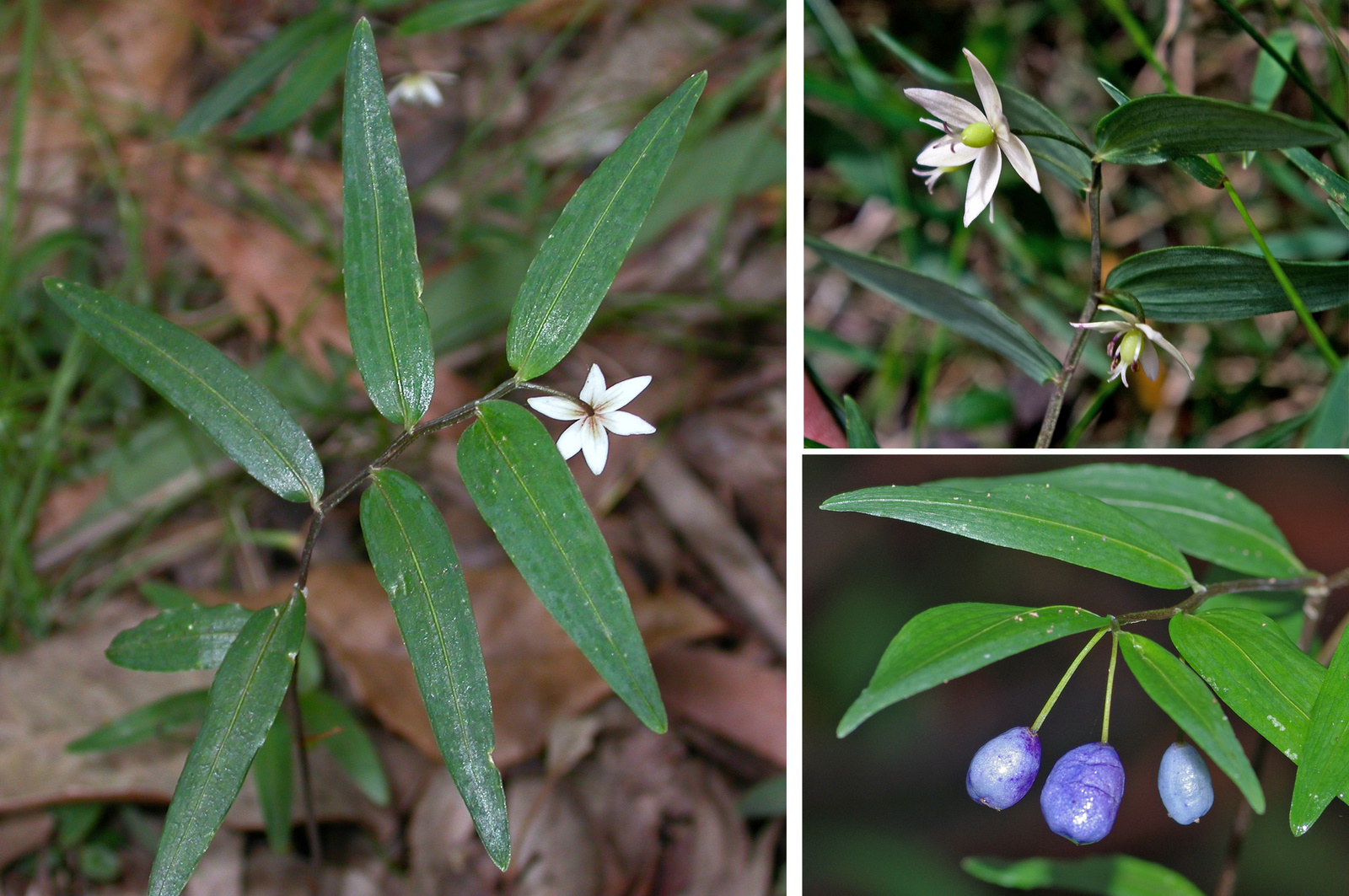
- Images of Drymophila cyanocarpa showing flowers and fruits

Scientific classification
- Kingdom: Plantae
- Clade: Embryophytes
- Clade: Tracheophytes
- Clade: Spermatophytes
- Clade: Angiosperms
- Clade: Monocots
- Order: Liliales
- Family: Alstroemeriaceae
- Genus: Drymophila
- Species: D. cyanocarpa

Binomial name
- Drymophila cyanocarpa R.Br.

= Drymophila cyanocarpa =

Species of plant

Drymophila cyanocarpa commonly known as turquoise berry or native Solomon's seal, is a monocot species of flowering plant in the family Alstroemeriaceae (formerly Liliaceae). The genus Drymophila has 2 species, D. cyanocarpa and D. moorei, both of which are native to Australia. D. moorei has orange-yellow berries and is found in northern NSW and Queensland. D. cyanocarpa is found in Tasmania, Victoria, and New South Wales (NSW).

== Description ==
A herbaceous perennial that spreads by rhizomes, it typically grows up to 50cm with an arched and sometimes branching stem. Leaves are lanceolate to 8cm long with a prominent midrib, dark green in colour, sitting horizontal and alternate along the stem. Flowering occurs from November-January. Flowers are creamy white in colour arising from leaf axils, they sit pendulous beneath the stem, are typically 1.5cm in diameter and star shaped. The flowers have 6 pointed petals and 6 stamens with oblong anthers. The stamens are typically shorter than the perianth segments, with a three-lobed ovary. The fruits are oblong or heart-shaped, 1-1.5cm in diameter and turquoise-blue in colour containing numerous seeds. In Tasmania, there are no species that look similar making this an easy plant to identify in the field.

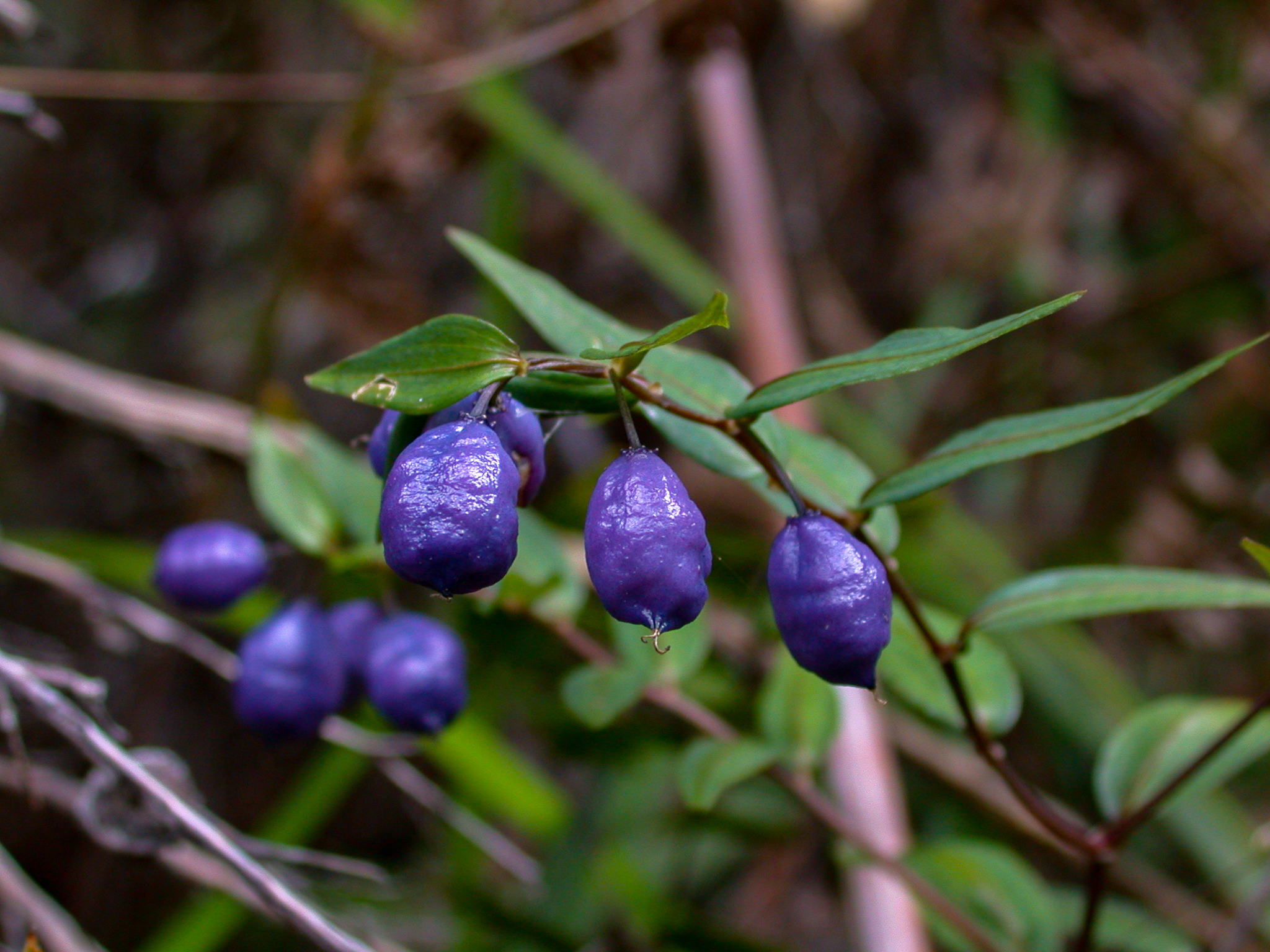
The fruit from which Drymophila cyanocarpa gets its species name, referring to the 'blue' fruit. Photo courtesy of Robert Wiltshire.

== Habitat and distribution ==
A common understory species that is found in wet eucalypt (wet sclerophyll) forest from sea level up to 900m. It is found in forests throughout Tasmania and less commonly in Victoria and NSW. In Victoria, it is typically found in the south-east of the state but can be found as far west as Otway National Park in western Victoria. In New South Wales it is restricted to the south east of the state up to Canberra.

== Naming and classification ==
Drymophila cyanocarpa was first published in 1810 by Scottish botanist and palaeobotanist Robert Brown, and was placed in the family Liliaceae. In 1998, Drymophila was changed to the family Luzuriagaceae under the order Liliales, however the 2009 APG III system merged Luzuriagaceae into the family Alstroemeriaceae where it remains today.

The name Drymophila likely originates from the Greek words Drymo and phila (lover). Drymo was one of the sea-nymphs from the Greek tale "Old Man of the Sea", who had waving locks of hair and a slender pale neck. This could refer to the long drooping stem of Drymophila along with the dangling, or waving, flowers and fruits that are found on this species.
