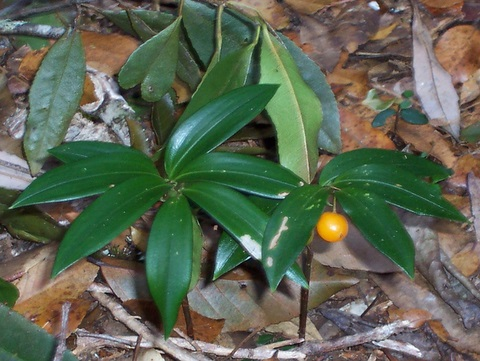
- Drymophila moorei in Australia

Scientific classification
- Kingdom: Plantae
- Clade: Tracheophytes
- Clade: Angiosperms
- Clade: Monocots
- Order: Liliales
- Family: Alstroemeriaceae
- Tribe: Luzuriageae; Benth. & Hook.f.

Type genus
- Luzuriaga Ruiz & Pav.

Genera
- Drymophila; Luzuriaga; sensu APWeb (Retrieved January 2009)

= Luzuriageae =

Tribe of plants

Luzuriageae is a tribe of monocotyledonous plants belonging to the family Alstroemeriaceae. It consists of very few species of perennial plants native to South America (Luzuriaga) and Australia and New Zealand (Drymophila). They are climbing plants with more or less woody stems and can be recognised by their distichous leaves which are turned "upside down" at the base, and their polysymmetrical white flowers with plain-coloured tepals and a succulent ovary.

In modern classification systems such as the APG III classification system (2009) and APWeb (2001 onwards), this clade is placed as a nested tribe within the wider Alstroemeriaceae. Previously (as in APG II 2003), the group was placed in its own family Luzuriagaceae.

== Phylogeny ==
Alstroemerieae is related to Luzuriagaeae. The two tribes share vegetative characters such as being climbing plants with twisted leaves so that the upper surface during development becomes lower at maturity, although the ovary is succulent in Alstroemeriaeae. Both tribes are related to each other (Rudall et al. 2000).

== Taxonomy ==
The family was not recognized by APG III (2009), which places its genera in the larger Alstroemeriaeae, given the morphological and phylogenetic similarities between the two families. The family had been recognised by APG II (2003). APWeb (2001 onwards) initially considered it separate but then decided to follow in the footsteps of APG III.

The tribe comprises two genera and six species. The genera, together with their valid publication, distribution and number of species are listed below:

- Drymophila R.Br., Prodr.: 292 (1810). eastern and south-eastern Australia. Includes two species.
- Luzuriaga Ruiz & Pav., Fl. Peruv. 3: 65 (1802), nom. cons. New Zealand, south-central and southern Chile, southern Argentina to the Falkland Islands. Includes four species.

== Bibliography ==
- Stevens, P. F. (2001). "Luzuriagaceae". Angiosperm Phylogeny Website. "(Version 9, June, 2008, and updated since then)"
