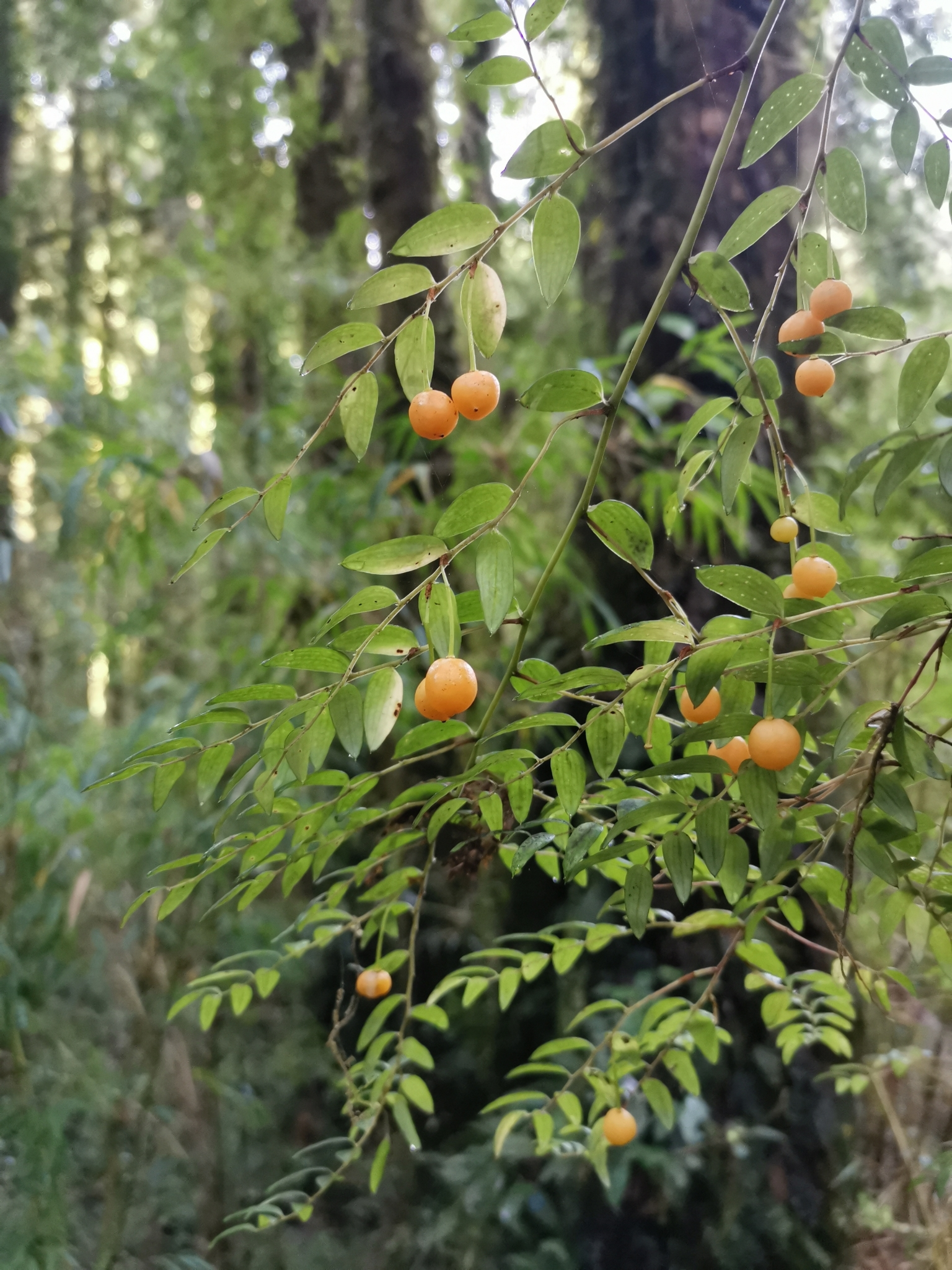

Scientific classification
- Kingdom: Plantae
- Clade: Tracheophytes
- Clade: Angiosperms
- Clade: Monocots
- Order: Liliales
- Family: Alstroemeriaceae
- Genus: Luzuriaga
- Species: L. polyphylla

Binomial name
- Luzuriaga polyphylla (Hook.) J.F.Macbr.

= Luzuriaga polyphylla =

Species of flowering plant

Luzuriaga polyphylla is a flowering plant species endemic to Chile. It is a vine distributed from the Maule to Magallanes regions.
