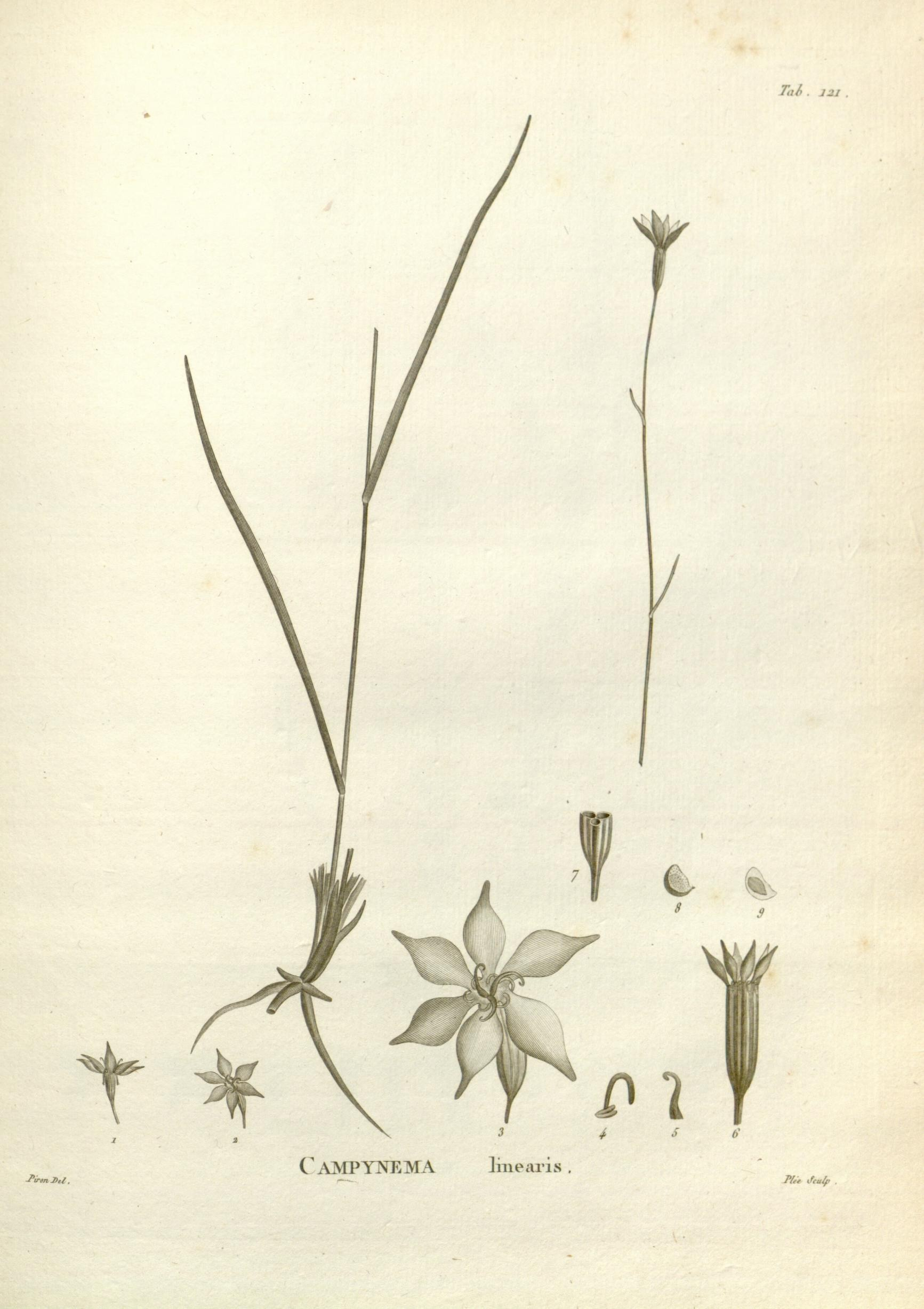
- Campynema lineare Labill.

Scientific classification
- Kingdom: Plantae
- Clade: Tracheophytes
- Clade: Angiosperms
- Clade: Monocots
- Order: Liliales
- Family: Campynemataceae
- Genus: Campynema; Labill.
- Species: C. lineare

Binomial name
- Campynema lineare Labill.

Synonyms
- Campynema pygmaeum F.Muell. ex Benth.

= Campynema =

Genus of flowering plants

Campynema is a genus in the family Campynemataceae first described in 1805. It contains only one known species (monotypic), Campynema lineare, endemic to the island of Tasmania in Australia. Its closest relative is Campynemanthe, endemic to New Caledonia, sole other genus of the family.

== Campynema lineare ==
C. lineare, also known as the green mountain lily, is a small inconspicuous erect herb that grows to 15–30 cm in height. Its leaves consist of a single, curved basal leaf, with smaller leaves ascending up the flower stem. It is most distinguishable by its striking green flower, which blooms in summer. The flower is usually solitary, with 6 green tepals, sometimes with a burgundy tinge and developing brown edges with age, lacking apparent nectaries. The anthers are dorsifixed, styluli are free but thickened and contiguous below. The seeds are numerous and are flattened, sometimes almost discoid, with a spongy outer coat. It is a geophyte, and its leaves are deciduous in winter.

C. lineare is approximately 57 million years old. It is considered to a key member of Tasmania's palaeoendemic flora. A study of the gene sequences of RuBisCO in C. lineare, found that the family Campynemataceae is the oldest of the order Liliales.

C. lineare was once considered to be part of the family Liliaceae.

Variation in flower coloration

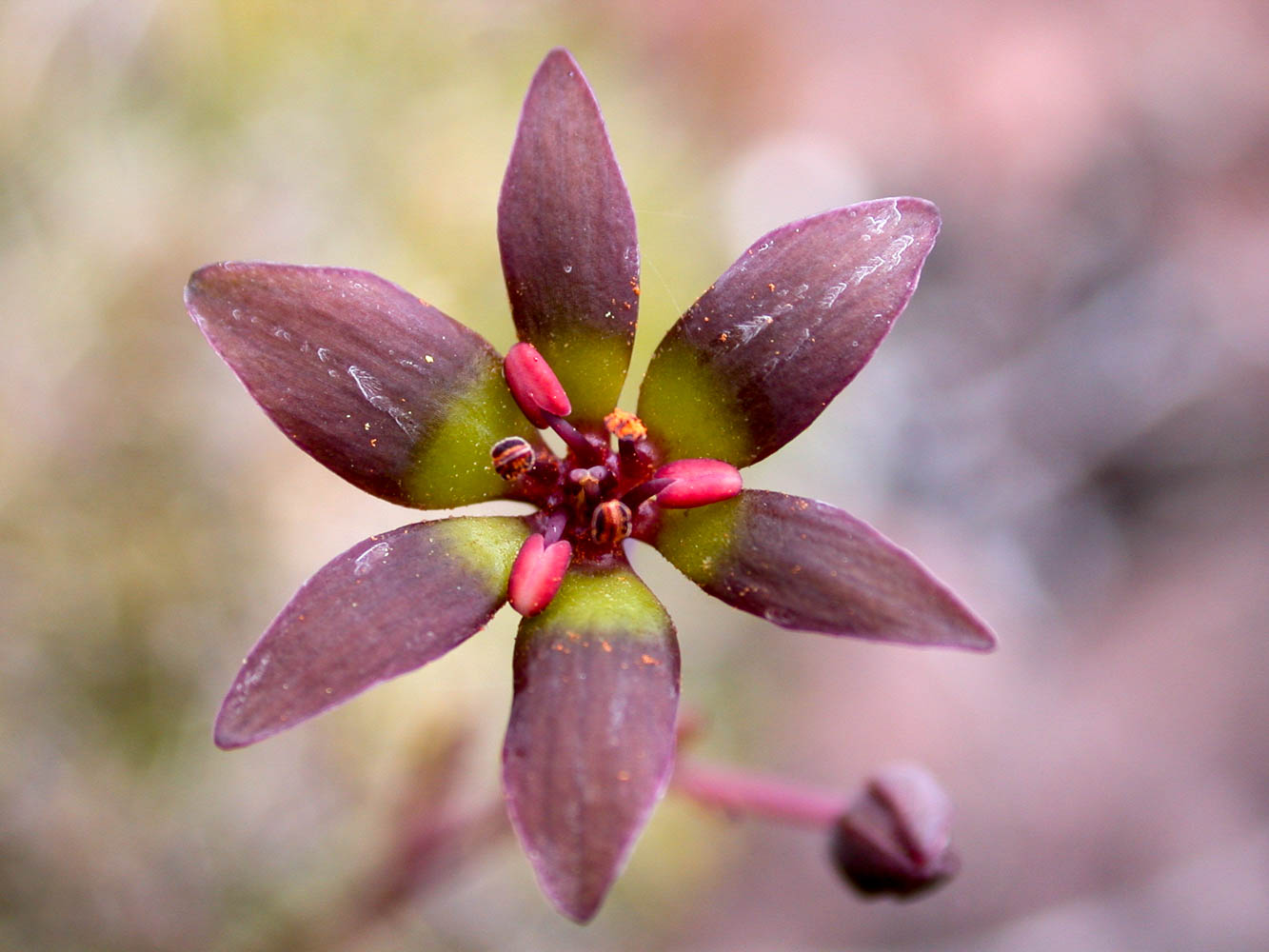

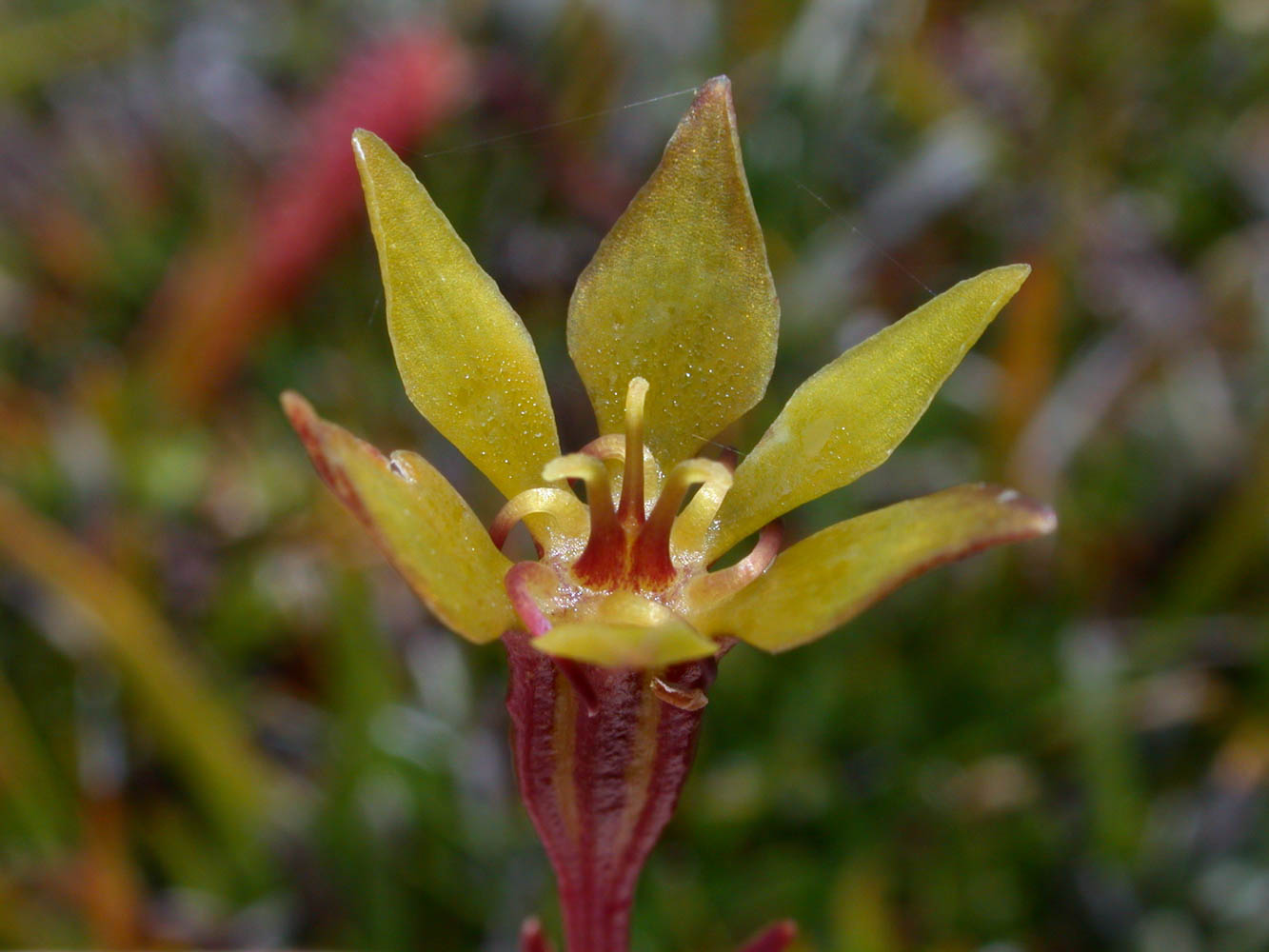

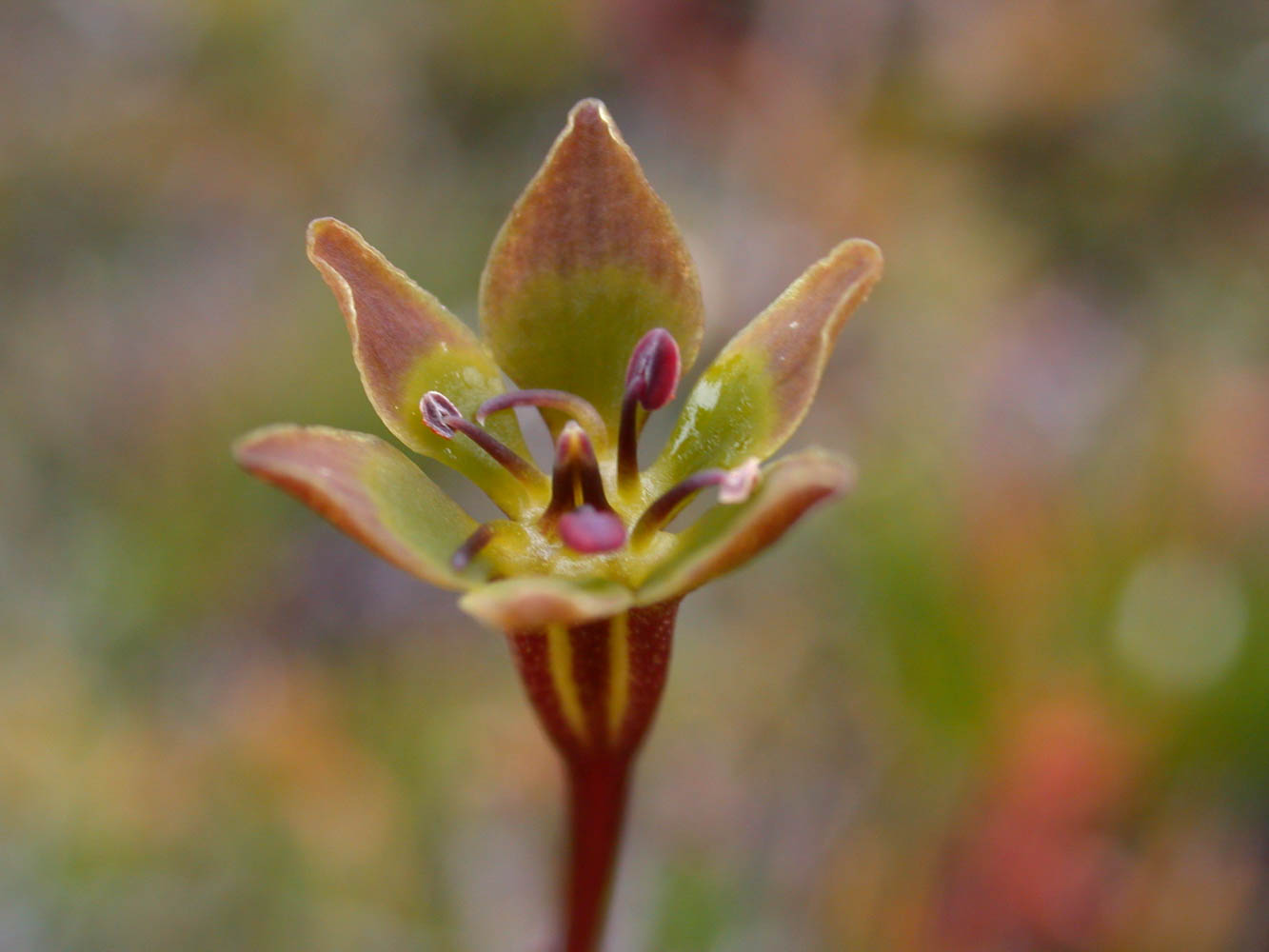

=== Distribution ===
C. lineare can be found in boggy sites in the central, western and central mountains of Tasmania, mostly in the subalpine and alpine regions. It is most commonly found in herbfields, heathlands, cushion plant communities, and lake edges.

=== Threats and Conservation ===
C. lineare is not considered under any specific threats due to being situated predominantly in protected areas, however some of the habitats in which it is found are predicted to decline due to climate change. The most likely declines in Australian alpine ecosystems have been shown to be in alpine herbfield and cushion plant communities. Due to its palaeoendemic status, the Tasmanian Parks and Wildlife Service consider C. lineare to be of high conservation significance.

== Bibliography ==
- Labillardière, Jacques Julien Houtou de (1804). Novae Hollandiae Plantarum Specimen (in Latin). Paris: Dominæ Huzard.

- Data related to Campynema at Wikispecies
