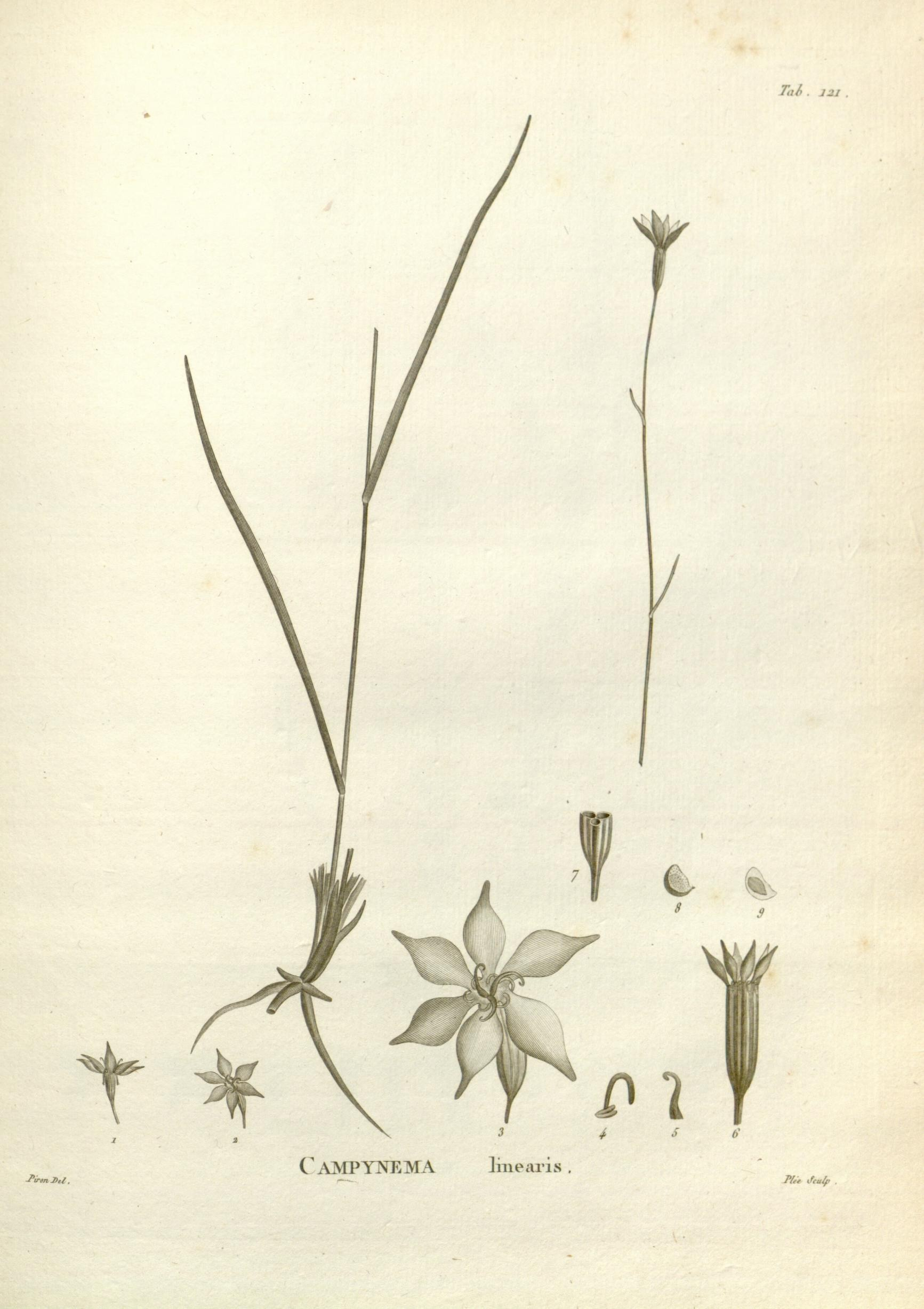
- Campynema lineare Labill.

Scientific classification
- Kingdom: Plantae
- Clade: Tracheophytes
- Clade: Angiosperms
- Clade: Monocots
- Order: Liliales
- Family: Campynemataceae; Dumort.

Type species
- Campynema lineare

Genera
- Campynema Labill.; Campynemanthe Baill.

Synonyms
- Campynemaceae; Campynematoideae

= Campynemataceae =

Family of flowering plants

Campynemataceae (Campynemaceae) is a family of flowering plants. The family consists of two genera and four species of perennial herbaceous plants endemic to New Caledonia and Tasmania.

== Taxonomy ==
Originally described by Dumortier in 1829, Campynemaceae consisted of a single genus, Campynema, described by Labillardière in Tasmania in 1804. In 1893 Baillon identified a closely related genus, Campynemanthe in New Caledonia. Together the two genera make up the family Campynemataceae sensu Angiosperm Phylogeny Group (APG), within the Liliales order.

While historically, the two genera have generally been treated together, their circumscription has varied considerably. The third edition (1903) of Engler's Syllabus only included Campynema, but positioned it as Campynematoideae, a subfamily of Amaryllidaceae.

=== Phylogeny ===
The synthesis of molecular data with cladistic analysis suggests that the Liliales form one of eleven orders of monocotyledons. Sequencing of the rbcL and trnL-F plastid genes revealed four main Liliales lineages:

1. Liliaceae group: Liliaceae (including some former Uvulariaceae and Calochortaceae), Philesiaceae and Smilacaceae;
2. Campynemataceae;
3. Colchicaceae group (Colchicoid lilies): Colchicaceae (including Petermannia and Uvularia), Alstroemeriaceae and Luzuriaga;
4. Melanthiaceae (including Trilliaceae).

This suggested that the Campynemataceae form one of seven families within the Liliales order.

- Liliales
  - Corsiaceae
  - Campynemataceae
  - branch with 50‑80% support
    - Melanthiaceae
    - branch with 50‑80% support
      - Petermanniaceae
      - - Colchicaceae
        - - Luzuriagaceae
          - Alstroemeriaceae
    - - - Ripogonaceae
        - Philesiaceae
      - - Smilacaceae
        - Liliaceae

== Bibliography ==
- Dahlgren, Rolf M.; Clifford, H. T.; Yeo, Peter (1985). The families of the monocotyledons: Structure, evolution, and taxonomy. Berlin and New York: Springer-Verlag. ISBN 978-3-642-64903-5. Additional excerpts
- Dahlgren, Rolf; Lu, An-ming (1985). "Campynemanthe (Campynemaceae): Morphology, microsporogenesis, early ovule ontogeny and relationships". Nordic Journal of Botany. 5 (4): 321–330. Bibcode:1985NorJB...5..321D. doi:10.1111/j.1756-1051.1985.tb01660.x.
- Kubitzki, Klaus (1998-08-27). Campynemataceae. Springer. pp. 173–175. ISBN 9783540640608., in Kubitzki & Huber (1998)
- Kubitzki, Klaus; Huber, Herbert, eds. (1998). The families and genera of vascular plants. Vol.3. Flowering plants. Monocotyledons: Lilianae (except Orchidaceae). Berlin, Germany: Springer-Verlag. ISBN 3-540-64060-6.
- Dumortier, Barthélemy-Charles (1829). Analyse des familles des plantes :avec l'indication des principaux genres qui s'y rattachent (in French). Tournay: Casterman.
- APG III (2009). "An Update of the Angiosperm Phylogeny Group classification for the orders and families of flowering plants: APG III". Botanical Journal of the Linnean Society. 161 (2): 105–121. doi:10.1111/j.1095-8339.2009.00996.x. hdl:10654/18083.
- Baillon, M. H. (1 November 1893). "L'organisation et les affinités des Campynémées". Bulletin Mensuel de la Société Linnéenne de Paris (in French). 2 (140): 1105–1109.
- Engler, Adolf (1903) [1892]. Syllabus der Pflanzenfamilien: eine Übersicht über das gesamte Pflanzensystem mit Berücksichtigung der Medicinal- und Nutzpflanzen nebst einer Übersicht über die Florenreiche und Florengebiete der Erde zum Gebrauch bei Vorlesungen und Studien über specielle und medicinisch-pharmaceutische Botanik (3rd ed.). Berlin: Gebrüder Borntraeger Verlag. p. 233.
- Goldblatt, Peter (1986). "Systematics and relationships of the bigeneric Pacific family Campynemataceae (Liliales)". Bulletin du Muséum National d'Histoire Naturelle, Section B. 8: 117–132.
- Meerow, A.W. (2012-09-17). Taxonomy and Phylogeny: Liliaceae. CRC Press. pp. 17–55. ISBN 9781439849248. In Kamenetsky & Okubo (2012)
- Rudall, P. J.; Stobart, K. L.; Hong, W-P.; Conran, J. G.; Furness, C. A.; Kite, G. C.; Chase, M. W. (2000-05-19). Consider the lilies: systematics of Liliales. Csiro. pp. 347–359. ISBN 9780643099296. In Wilson & Morrison (2000)
- Kamenetsky, Rina; Okubo, Hiroshi, eds. (2012). Ornamental Geophytes: From Basic Science to Sustainable Production. CRC Press. ISBN 978-1-4398-4924-8.
- Wilson, K. L.; Morrison, D. A., eds. (2000). Monocots: Systematics and evolution (Proceedings of the Second International Conference on the Comparative Biology of the Monocotyledons, Sydney, Australia 1998). Collingwood, Australia: CSIRO. ISBN 0-643-06437-0. Excerpts
