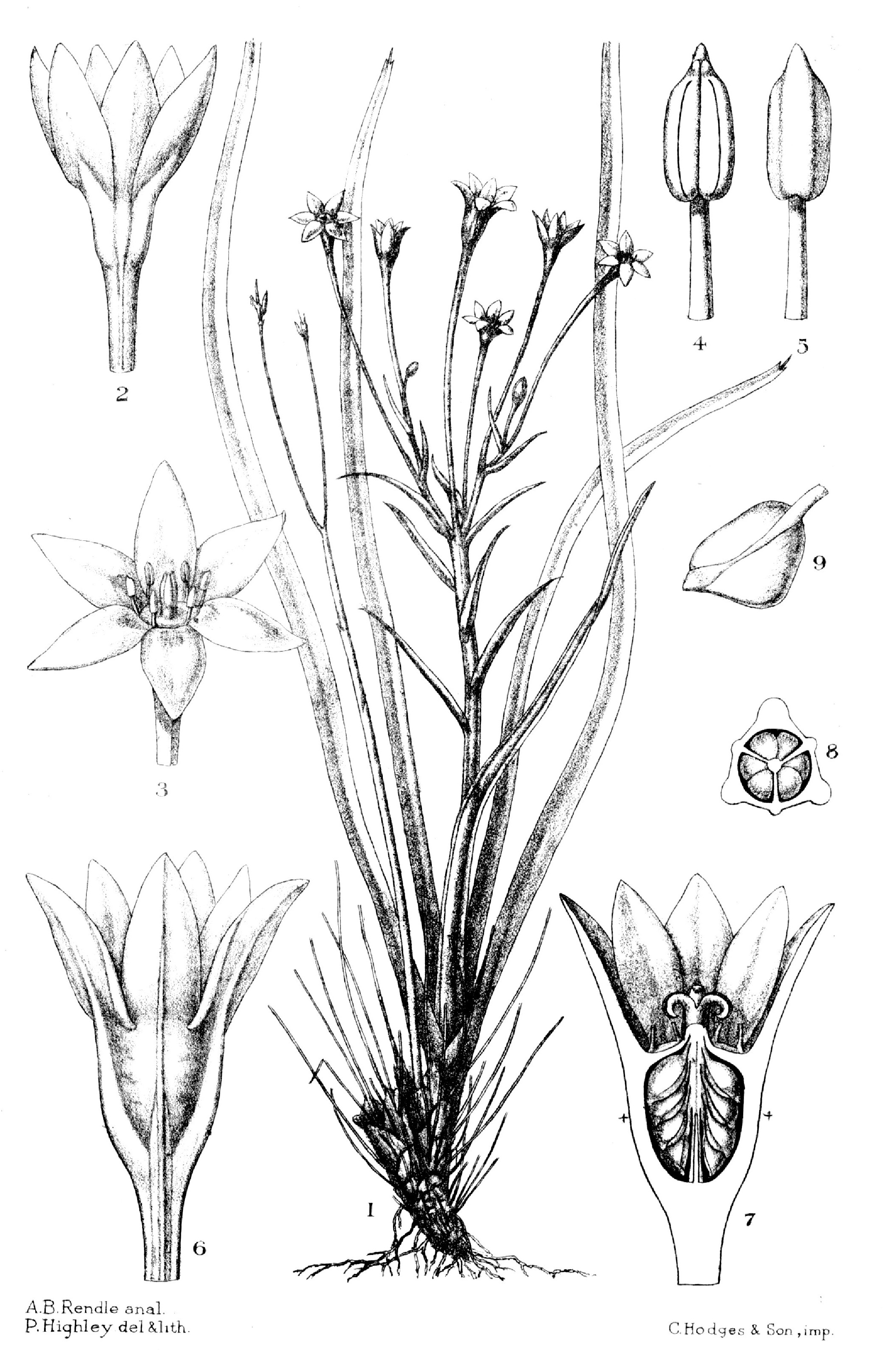
- Campynemanthe neocaledonica

Scientific classification
- Kingdom: Plantae
- Clade: Tracheophytes
- Clade: Angiosperms
- Clade: Monocots
- Order: Liliales
- Family: Campynemataceae
- Genus: Campynemanthe; Baill.

= Campynemanthe =

Genus of flowering plants

Campynemanthe is a genus of plants in the Campynemataceae family, first described by Henri Baillon in 1893. The entire genus is endemic to New Caledonia in the southwestern Pacific. Its closest relative is the monotypic genus Campynema from Tasmania, the sole other genus of the family.

== List of species ==
- Campynemanthe neocaledonica (Rendle) Goldblatt
- Campynemanthe parva Goldblatt 1986
- Campynemanthe viridiflora Baill. 1893

== Bibliography ==
- Baillon, M. H. (1 November 1893). "L'organisation et les affinités des Campynémées". Bulletin Mensuel de la Société Linnéenne de Paris (in French). 2 (140): 1105–1109.
- Dahlgren, Rolf; Lu, An-ming (1985). "Campynemanthe (Campynemaceae): Morphology, microsporogenesis, early ovule ontogeny and relationships". Nordic Journal of Botany. 5 (4): 321–330. doi:10.1111/j.1756-1051.1985.tb01660.x.
