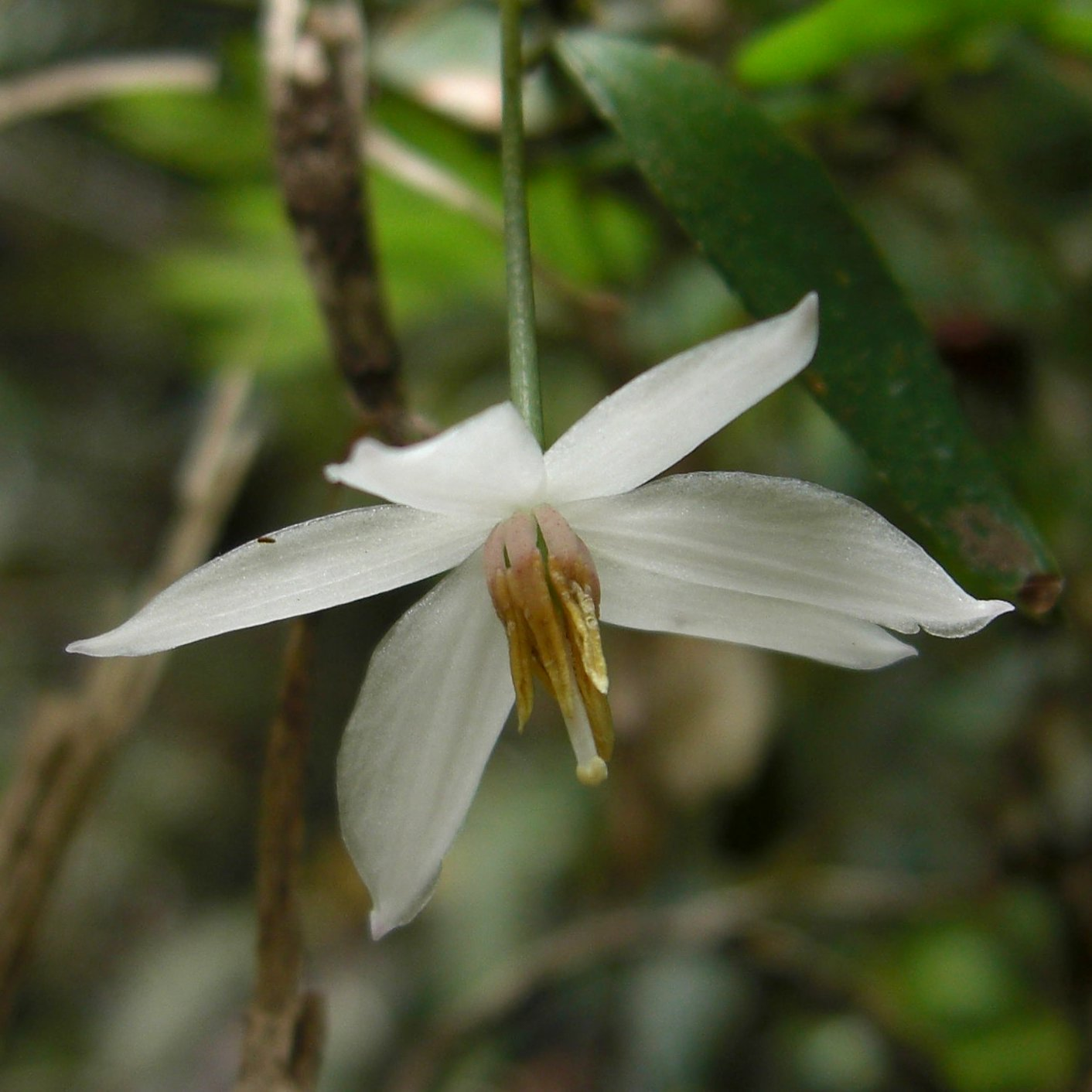
- Luzuriaga radicans

Scientific classification
- Kingdom: Plantae
- Clade: Embryophytes
- Clade: Tracheophytes
- Clade: Spermatophytes
- Clade: Angiosperms
- Clade: Monocots
- Order: Liliales
- Family: Alstroemeriaceae
- Genus: Luzuriaga
- Species: L. radicans

Binomial name
- Luzuriaga radicans Ruiz et Pavón

Synonyms
- Enargea radicans F.Muell.

= Luzuriaga radicans =

Species of flowering plant

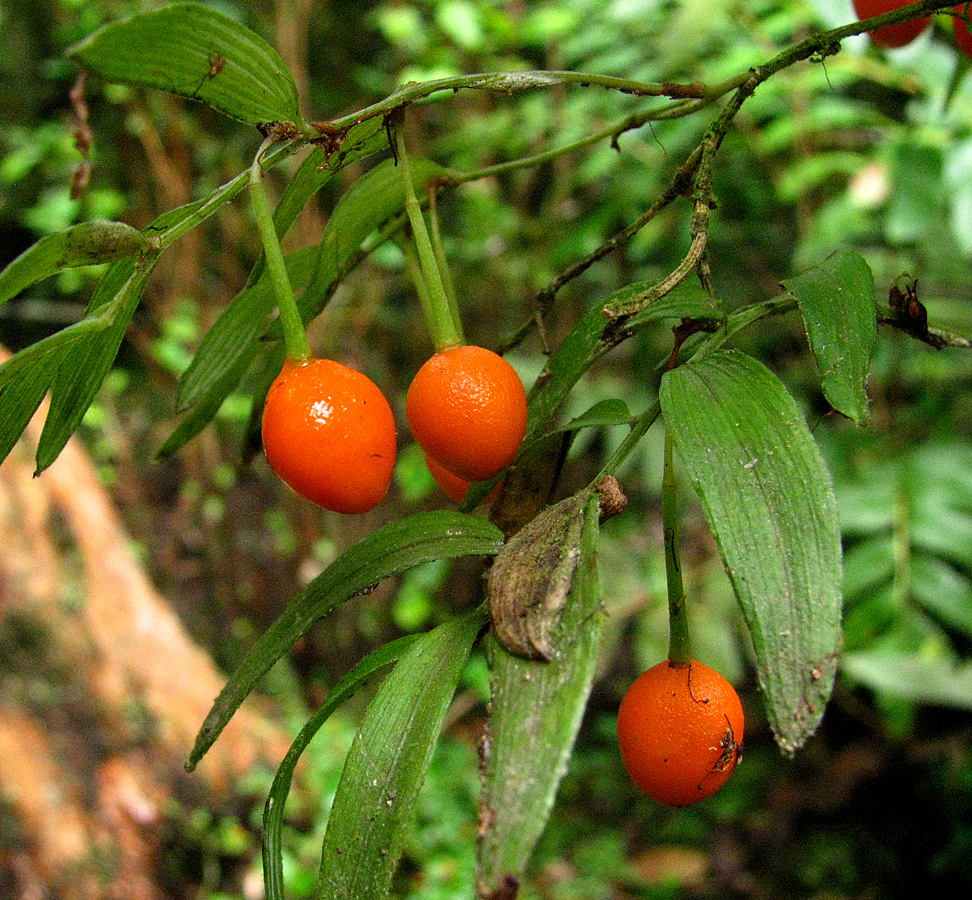
Fruit and leaves

Luzuriaga radicans (common name quilineja) is a species of flowering plant in the genus Luzuriaga of the family Alstroemeriaceae (Inca-lilies), part of the monocot order Liliales. It is native to Chile and Argentina.

== Description ==
Luzuriaga radicans is an evergreen climbing plant, whose fine roots adhere to the trunks of trees. The leaves are alternate, distal and with an entire border, oblong-lanceolate in shape, the acute tip ending abruptly. They are light green in color, and from 1–4 cm in length and 0.3–1 cm wide, with 9–13 white lines on the undersurface. The flowers are hermaphroditic, 1 cm in length and either single or forming an inflorescence with 2–4 flowers. The six white tepals are uneven in size. There are six stamens, and the style, which is longer than the stamens, ends in a tri-lobed stigma. The fruit is a smooth, globose berry, red-orange in color and 0.8–1 cm in diameter, with up to twelve flattened seeds about 4 mm in length.

== Taxonomy ==
Luzuriaga radicans was first described by the Spanish botanists Hipólito Ruiz López and José Antonio Pavón Jiménez in 1802, and consequently the botanical authority is stated as Ruiz et Pavón. It is the type-species of genus Luzuriaga, which includes four species.

=== Etymology ===
The epithet radicans (Latin: with rooting stems), refers to the characteristic climbing roots.

== Distribution and habitat ==
Luzuriaga radicans is native to South Central to South Chile and South Argentina. In Chile, it grows from Colchagua to Aisén provinces (regions VI–XI), where it prefers a shady humid environment with constant rainfall under dense vegetation cover. In coastal areas it grows up to 500 m, while in coastal mountain areas its range is 500–2000 m. It also occurs at low altitudes in interior valleys.

== Ecology ==
The plant thrives in humid environments and can grow either in water or with its roots in water, including marshes, bogs, and the shores of lakes and rivers.

== Conservation ==
The plant, and hence its uses, has become scarce, due to overusage and the destruction of forests. However it can be found in protected areas such as the Llancahue reserve near Valdivia.

== Cultivation ==
Cultivation is difficult. After the vine has been removed from the tree, it takes about 5 years to regrow.

== Uses ==
The plant is valued as an ornamental, while the stems are used in the manufacture of household utensils and handicrafts, including basketry and brooms. Historically it was also used for fences and ropes, but now it is mainly used for artisanal crafts. The fruit is edible and eaten raw, and was a traditional food, but has fallen out of use.

== In popular culture ==
Luzuriaga radicans appears in Chilote mythology, where a creature called Trauco clothes himself in the plant and sustains himself on its fruit.

== Bibliography ==
Books and theses

- Yeo, PF (2011) [1984]. "Luzuriaga radicans". In Cullen, James; Knees, Sabina G.; Cubey, H. Suzanne Cubey (eds.). The European Garden Flora, Flowering Plants: A Manual for the Identification of Plants Cultivated in Europe, Both Out-of-Doors and Under Glass. Vol. 1. Alismataceae to Orchidaceae (2nd ed.). Cambridge: Cambridge University Press. p. 171. ISBN 978-0-521-76147-5.
- Gledhill, David (2006). The names of plants (4th ed.). Cambridge: Cambridge University Press. p. 325. ISBN 978-0-521-86645-3.
- Ruiz, Hipólito; Pavón, José (1798–1802). Flora Peruviana, et Chilensis, sive, Descriptiones et icones plantarum Peruvianarum, et Chilensium, secundum systema Linnaeanum digestae, cum characteribus plurium generum evulgatorum reformatis V vols. plus plates. Vol. 3. Madrid: Typis Gabrielis de Sancha. p. 66., also at El Real Jardín Botánico, Madrid
- Rozzi, Ricardo (2010). Multi-ethnic Bird Guide of the Sub-Antarctic Forests of South America. Sub-Antarctic Biocultural Conservation Program, University of North Texas - Universidad de Magallanes. p. 50. ISBN 978-1-57441-282-6.
- Barreau Daly, Antonia (2014). Narrating changing foodways: wild edible plant knowledge and traditional food systems in Mapuche lands of the Andean Temperate Forests, Chile (MSc thesis). University of British Columbia.

Websites

- Schilling, Darian Stark (2013). "Luzuriaga radicans". Enciclopedia de la Flora Chilena. Archived from the original on 4 May 2013.
- "Luzuriaga radicans Ruiz & Pav.". Tropicos. Missouri Botanical Garden. 2020.
- POWO (2020). "Luzuriaga radicans Ruiz & Pav". Plants of the World Online. Royal Botanic Gardens, Kew.
- WFO (2019). "Luzuriaga radicans Ruiz & Pav". World Flora Online.
- "La quilineja y la familia Marilicán" (PDF) (in Spanish). Ancud: Museo Regional de Ancud. 2007.
- "Chiloe: a place of myths and legends". This is Chile. 8 November 2017.
- Belov, Michail (2012). "Luzuriaga radicans (Quilineja, Coral, Azahar)". Chile flora.
- "Peri-urban Reserve Llancahue". ChileContacto. Valdivia Turismo. 26 July 2017.
