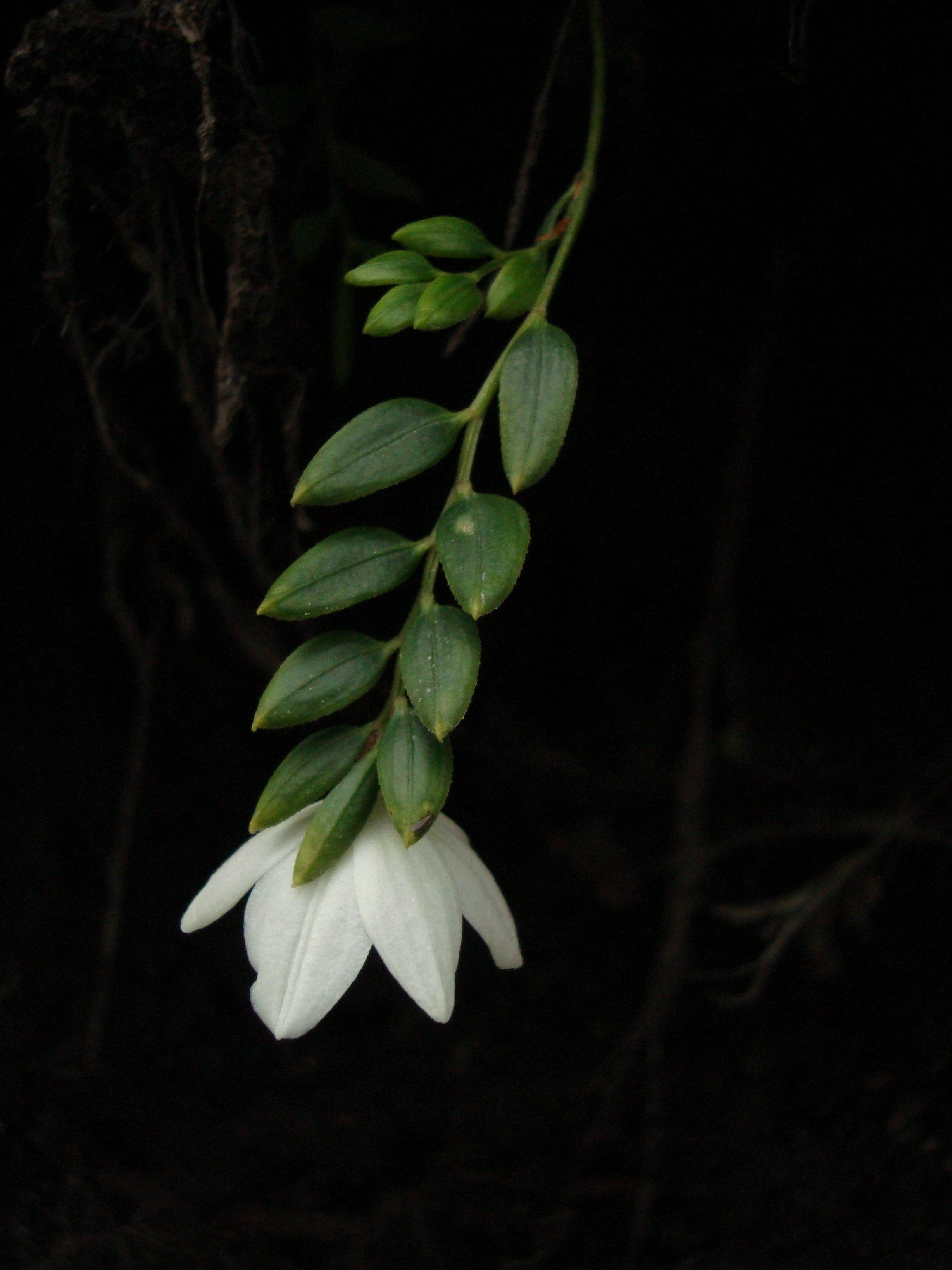

Scientific classification
- Kingdom: Plantae
- Clade: Tracheophytes
- Clade: Angiosperms
- Clade: Monocots
- Order: Liliales
- Family: Alstroemeriaceae
- Genus: Luzuriaga
- Species: L. marginata

Binomial name
- Luzuriaga marginata (Gaertn.) Benth. & Hook.f.

Synonyms
- Callixene magellanica Raeusch. Callixene marginata (Gaertn.) Lam. Callixene marginata Juss. Enargea marginata Gaertn.

= Luzuriaga marginata =

Species of flowering plant

Luzuriaga marginata, commonly known as almond flower, is a woody vine that is native to Patagonia as well as the Falkland Islands. In Chile, it is distributed along the southern regions, from Los Ríos to Magallanes. Plants grow to 3 metres high and have pale, glossy green leaves that are up to 22 mm long. Perfumed flowers about 20 mm in diameter are produced in the leaf axils in summer. These are followed by dark purple berries that are up to 10 mm in diameter.
