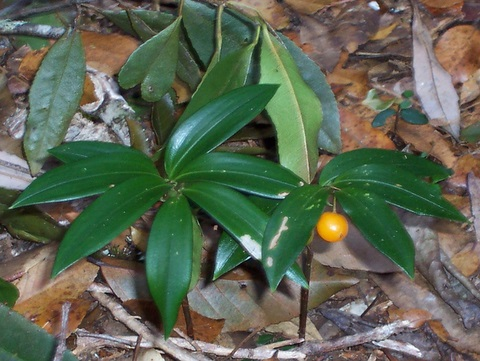
- Drymophila moorei

Scientific classification
- Kingdom: Plantae
- Clade: Embryophytes
- Clade: Tracheophytes
- Clade: Spermatophytes
- Clade: Angiosperms
- Clade: Monocots
- Order: Liliales
- Family: Alstroemeriaceae
- Tribe: Luzuriageae
- Genus: Drymophila; R.Br.

Type species
- Drymophila cyanocarpa

= Drymophila (plant) =

Genus of flowering plants

Drymophila is a genus of flowering plants in the family Alstroemeriaceae. It has also been placed in Luzuriagaceae, Convallariaceae and Liliaceae.

There are two species, both native to Australia:

Image	Name	Description	Distribution
	Drymophila cyanocarpa R.Br.	turquoise berry or native Solomons seal	native to Tasmania, Victoria and southern New South Wales
	Drymophila moorei Baker	orange berry	native to northern New South Wales and Queensland.

== See also ==
- Luzuriageae
