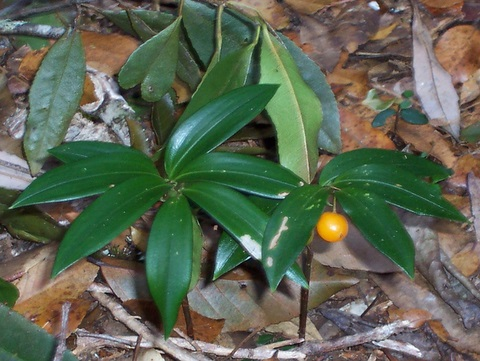
- Drymophila moorei at Mount Banda Banda, Australia

Scientific classification
- Kingdom: Plantae
- Clade: Tracheophytes
- Clade: Angiosperms
- Clade: Monocots
- Order: Liliales
- Family: Alstroemeriaceae
- Genus: Drymophila
- Species: D. moorei

Binomial name
- Drymophila moorei Baker

Synonyms
- Drymophila pyrrhocarpa F.Muell.

= Drymophila moorei =

Orange berry

Species of flowering plant

Drymophila moorei, the orange berry, occurs naturally from the Manning River in northern New South Wales to Queensland. The habit is as a herb, occurring at the rainforest floor, usually at high altitudes. Easily identified when in fruit.

Drymophila is a genus of flowering plants in the family Alstroemeriaceae. It has also been placed in Luzuriagaceae, Convallariaceae and Liliaceae.

== Description ==
A small glossy leaved plant up to 30 cm high. The main vertical stem is unbranched. Leaves 3 to 6 cm long, 1 to 2 cm wide. Leaves almost without a stem, the petiole being 1 mm long. Broad lanceolate to elliptic in shape with a prominent raised midrib and narrow point.

Flowers occur mostly in spring with white or pinkish petals. The berry is orange or yellow in colour, with a small number of seeds. The berry is ovoid in shape, 1 to 1.5 cm long.

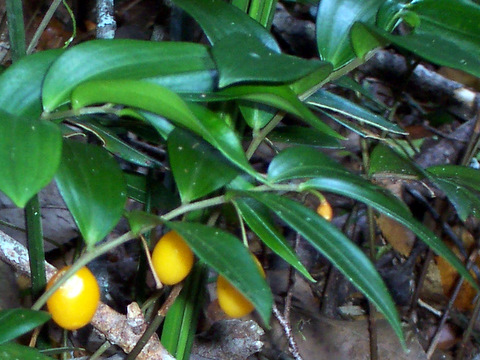
Orange Berry fruit & leaves at Mount Banda Banda, Australia
