= Angiosperm Phylogeny Website =

Angiosperm taxonomic classification at Missouri Botanical gardens

The Angiosperm Phylogeny Website (or APweb) is a website that presents up-to-date research on the phylogeny and taxonomy of flowering plants (angiosperms) in what is intended to be a user-friendly way.

== Overview ==
The site is hosted by the Missouri Botanical Garden website and maintained by researchers, Peter F. Stevens and Hilary M. Davis. Peter F. Stevens is a member of the Angiosperm Phylogeny Group (APG). The taxonomy presented is broadly based on the work of the APG, with modifications to incorporate new results.
