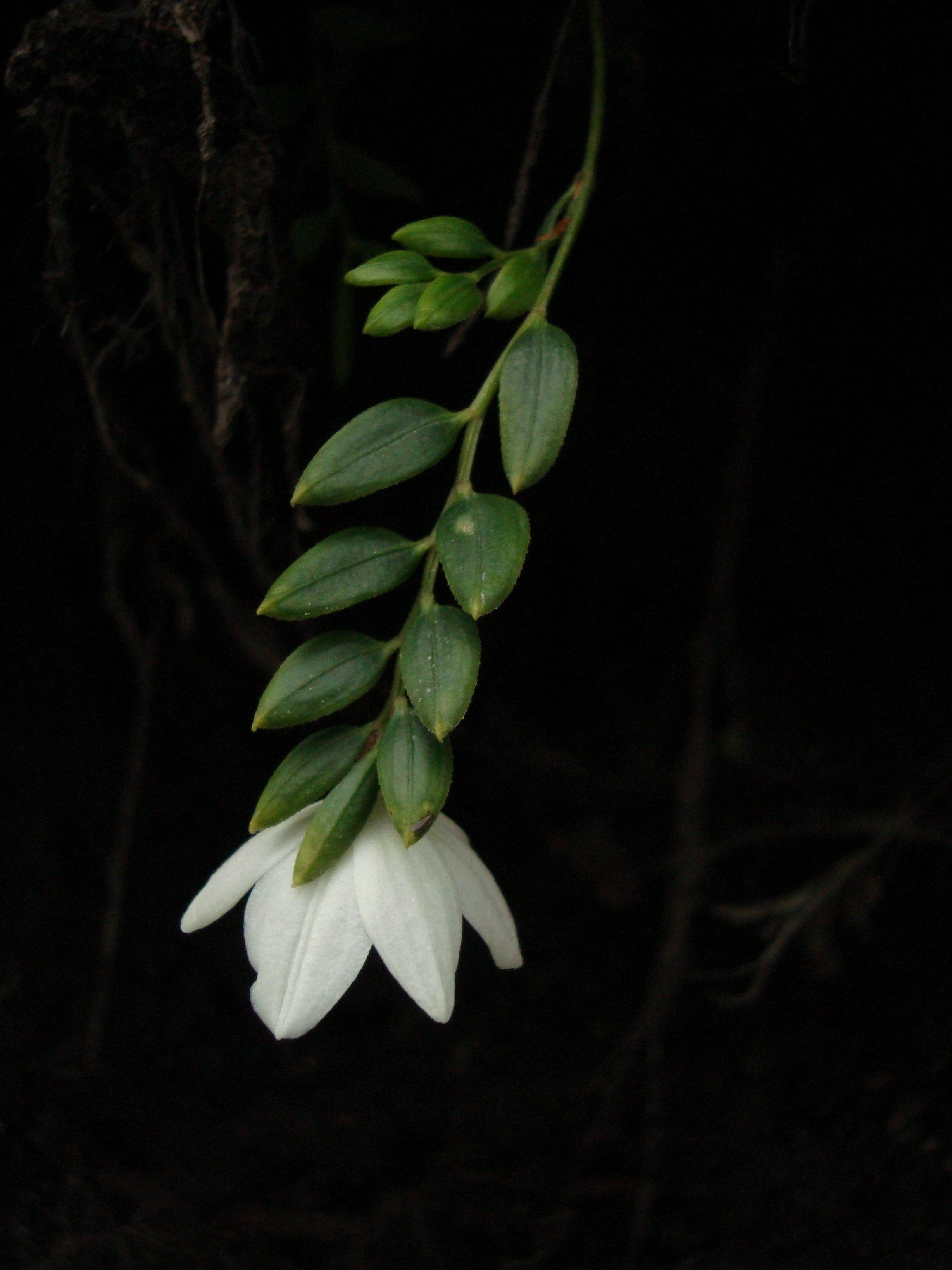
- Luzuriaga marginata

Scientific classification
- Kingdom: Plantae
- Clade: Tracheophytes
- Clade: Angiosperms
- Clade: Monocots
- Order: Liliales
- Family: Alstroemeriaceae
- Tribe: Luzuriageae
- Genus: Luzuriaga; Ruiz & Pav. 1802

Type species
- Luzuriaga radicans Ruiz & Pav.

Synonyms
- Enargea Banks ex Gaertn.; Callixene Comm. ex Juss.; Calcoa Salisb.

= Luzuriaga (plant) =

Genus of flowering plants

Luzuriaga is a genus of flowering plants in the family Alstroemeriaceae. It is native to New Zealand, Chile, Argentina and the Falkland Islands.

== Species ==
Image	Name	Distribution
	Luzuriaga marginata (Gaertn.) Benth. & Hook.f. - almond flower	Southern Chile, Southern Argentina, Falkland Islands
	Luzuriaga parviflora (Hook.f.) Kunth	New Zealand
	Luzuriaga polyphylla (Hook.f.) J.F.Macbr.	Southern Chile
	Luzuriaga radicans Ruiz & Pav.	Southern Chile, Southern Argentina

Formerly included

- Luzuriaga angustifolia, now called Eustrephus latifolius
- Luzuriaga cordata, now called Dioscorea humilis
- Luzuriaga cymosa, now called Geitonoplesium cymosum
- Luzuriaga latifolia, now called Eustrephus latifolius
- Luzuriaga laxiflora, now called Geitonoplesium cymosum
- Luzuriaga montana, now called Geitonoplesium cymosum
- Luzuriaga sewelliae, now called Asparagus asparagoides
- Luzuriaga timorensis, now called Geitonoplesium cymosum

== See also ==
- Luzuriageae
