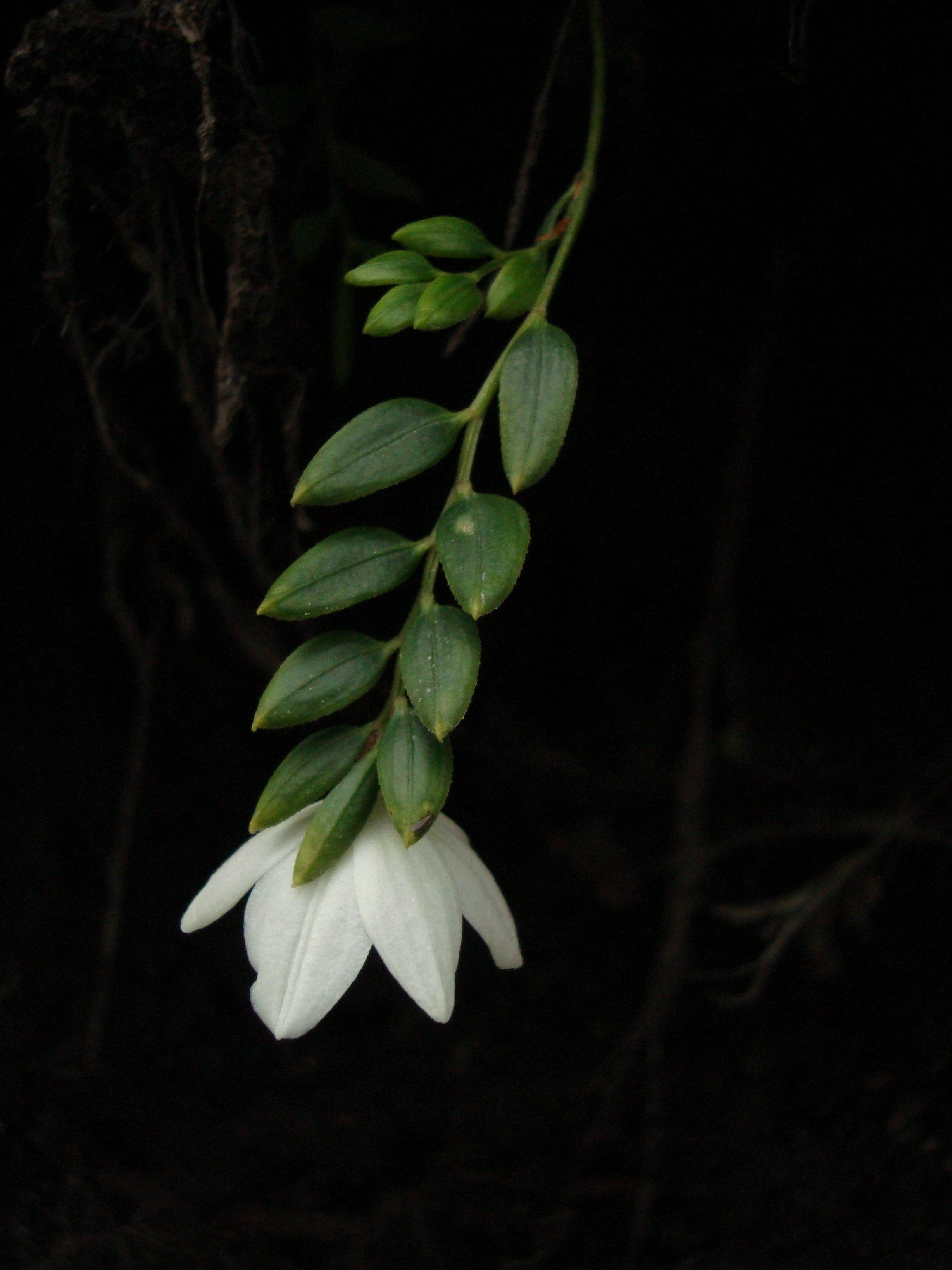
- Luzuriaga marginata

Scientific classification
- Kingdom: Plantae
- Clade: Tracheophytes
- Clade: Angiosperms
- Clade: Monocots
- Order: Liliales
- Family: Luzuriagaceae; Lotsy, 1911

Type genus
- Luzuriaga

Genera
- Luzuriaga Ruiz & Pav.; Drymophila R.Br.

= Luzuriagaceae =

Family of flowering plants

Luzuriagaceae is a family of flowering plants that was recognized in the 1998 APG system and the 2003 APG II system. The 2009 APG III system merged this small family into the Alstroemeriaceae, within the order Liliales, in the clade monocots.
